= 1958 in film =

The year 1958 in film involved some significant events. Le Beau Serge is credited as the first feature film of the Nouvelle Vague, one of the most famous productions of the genre, also released this year, was Ascenseur pour l'échafaud, notable for its improvised soundtrack by Miles Davis. Releases in the United States included the hit musicals South Pacific and Gigi, the latter winning nine Academy Awards, including Best Picture and Best Director. In India, M. G. Ramachandran made his debut as a director with Nadodi Mannan.

== Top-grossing films (U.S.) ==
The top ten 1958 released films by box office gross in North America are as follows:

Highest-grossing films of 1958
Rank	Title	Distributor	Domestic rentals
1	South Pacific	20th Century Fox	$16,300,000
2	Auntie Mame	Warner Bros.	$9,100,000
3	Cat on a Hot Tin Roof	MGM	$7,660,000
4	No Time for Sergeants	Warner Bros.	$7,500,000
5	Gigi	MGM	$6,500,000
6	The Vikings	United Artists	$6,000,000
7	The Young Lions	20th Century Fox	$4,480,000
8	The Inn of the Sixth Happiness	20th Century Fox	$4,400,000
9	Some Came Running	MGM	$4,245,000
10	Indiscreet	Warner Bros.	$3,600,000

== Events ==
- February 16 – In the Money, directed by William Beaudine, is released. It will be the last installment of The Bowery Boys series which began in 1946.
- February 27 – Harry Cohn, the remaining founder of Columbia Pictures and one of the last remaining Hollywood movie moguls, dies.
- April – Samuel J. Briskin leaves MGM and rejoins Columbia Pictures later becoming vice president and general manager of the studio.
- April 4 – Killing of Johnny Stompanato: Actress Lana Turner's 14-year-old daughter Cheryl Crane fatally stabs her mother's abusive partner, mobster Johnny Stompanato, at their home in Beverly Hills, California, in what is ruled to be justifiable homicide.
- April 22 – Sol C. Siegel becomes head of studio operations at MGM.
- May 15 – Metro-Goldwyn-Mayer releases Gigi, one of the last classic MGM musicals. Directed by Vincente Minnelli, produced by Arthur Freed and written by Alan Jay Lerner, the film is released to considerable critical and commercial success and will become the highest-grossing musical ever made by MGM until That's Entertainment! in 1974.
- May 17 – Joseph E. Levine presents a picture on his own for the first time with 1954's Attila in an all-out exploitation saturation booking in the United States earning rentals of $2 million.
- August 31 – Carry on Sergeant, the first film in the popular British Carry On series, opens.
- September 1 – The second installment of Sergei Eisenstein's Ivan the Terrible is officially released to the public in the Soviet Union, having been completed in 1946 but previously shelved for political reasons. It is the last of Eisenstein's Ivan the Terrible trilogy as the director died in 1948 during production on Part III.
- October – Universal Pictures sells the Universal lot to Music Corporation of America for $11.25 million and leases it back for $1 million a year.
- November 15 – During production of Solomon and Sheba in Madrid, Spain, actor Tyrone Power dies of a massive heart attack. The production of the film is halted and it is finished in late 1959. Power, who was playing the role of King Solomon, is replaced in the film by Yul Brynner.
- December 16 – MCA Inc. acquires the Universal Pictures studio lot for $11 million. It will later acquire the whole studio.

== Awards ==
Category/Organization	16th Golden Globe Awards March 5, 1959		31st Academy Awards April 6, 1959
Category/Organization	Drama	Comedy or Musical	31st Academy Awards April 6, 1959
Best Film	The Defiant Ones	Auntie Mame (Comedy); Gigi (Musical)	Gigi
Best Director	Vincente Minnelli; Gigi		
Best Actor	David Niven; Separate Tables	Danny Kaye; Me and the Colonel	David Niven; Separate Tables
Best Actress	Susan Hayward; I Want to Live!	Rosalind Russell; Auntie Mame	Susan Hayward; I Want to Live!
Best Supporting Actor	Burl Ives; The Big Country		
Best Supporting Actress	Hermione Gingold; Gigi		Wendy Hiller; Separate Tables
Best Foreign Language Film	Girl and the River; The Road a Year Long; Rosemary		Mon Oncle

== Notable films released in 1958 ==
United States unless stated

=== A ===
- Amar Deep, remake of Amara Deepam, starring Dev Anand, Vyjayanthimala and Padmini – (India)
- Ambush at Cimarron Pass, starring Scott Brady and Clint Eastwood
- And Quiet Flows the Don (Tikhiy Don) – (U.S.S.R.)
- Andy Hardy Comes Home, starring Mickey Rooney
- Another Time, Another Place, starring Lana Turner and Sean Connery – (Britain)
- Apache Territory, starring Rory Calhoun
- Arms and the Man (Helden) – (West Germany)
- Ash Wednesday (Miércoles de ceniza), starring María Félix and Arturo de Córdova – (Mexico)
- Ashes and Diamonds (Popiół i diament), directed by Andrzej Wajda, starring Zbigniew Cybulski – (Poland)
- Attack of the 50 Foot Woman, starring Allison Hayes
- Auntie Mame, starring Rosalind Russell, Coral Browne, Forrest Tucker, Roger Smith, Peggy Cass

=== B ===
- The Ballad of Narayama (Narayama Bushiko) – (Japan)
- The Barbarian and the Geisha, starring John Wayne and Eiko Ando
- Le Beau Serge (Handsome Serge), directed by Claude Chabrol – (France)
- Bell, Book and Candle, starring James Stewart, Kim Novak, Jack Lemmon, Ernie Kovacs
- The Big Country, directed by William Wyler, starring Gregory Peck, Charlton Heston, Jean Simmons, Carroll Baker, Burl Ives, Charles Bickford, Chuck Connors
- Big Deal on Madonna Street (I soliti ignoti), starring Vittorio Gassman, Claudia Cardinale, Marcello Mastroianni – (Italy)
- The Black Orchid, starring Sophia Loren and Anthony Quinn
- The Blob, starring Steve McQueen
- Bonjour Tristesse, directed by Otto Preminger, starring David Niven, Deborah Kerr, Jean Seberg
- The Bonnie Parker Story, starring Dorothy Provine
- The Bravados, starring Gregory Peck and Joan Collins
- Brink of Life (Nära livet), directed by Ingmar Bergman, starring Eva Dahlbeck and Ingrid Thulin – (Sweden)
- The Brothers Karamazov, directed by Richard Brooks, starring Yul Brynner, Maria Schell, Lee J. Cobb, Claire Bloom
- The Buccaneer, directed by Anthony Quinn, starring Yul Brynner and Claire Bloom
- Buchanan Rides Alone, directed by Budd Boetticher, starring Randolph Scott and Craig Stevens

=== C ===
- Cairo Station (Bab el Hadid), directed by Youssef Chahine – (Egypt)
- Carry On Sergeant, the first in the Carry On film series, directed by Gerald Thomas, starring William Hartnell, Kenneth Williams, Kenneth Connor – (Britain)
- Carve Her Name with Pride, starring Virginia McKenna and Paul Scofield – (Britain)
- The Castle of the Monsters (El Castillo de los Monstruos) – (Mexico)
- Cat on a Hot Tin Roof, directed by Richard Brooks, starring Elizabeth Taylor, Paul Newman, Burl Ives, Jack Carson, Judith Anderson
- A Certain Smile, starring Rossano Brazzi and Joan Fontaine
- Chalti Ka Naam Gaadi (That which runs is a car), starring Ashok Kumar and Madhubala – (India)
- Chase a Crooked Shadow, starring Richard Todd and Anne Baxter – (Britain)
- China Doll, starring Victor Mature
- The Colossus of New York, starring Ross Martin and Mala Powers
- Cowboy, starring Glenn Ford and Jack Lemmon
- The Crawling Eye (The Trollenberg Terror), directed by Quentin Lawrence, starring Forrest Tucker and Janet Munro – (Britain)
- The Cry Baby Killer, directed by Roger Corman, featuring Jack Nicholson in his film debut
- Cry Terror!, starring James Mason, Inger Stevens, Rod Steiger, Angie Dickinson

=== D ===
- Damn Yankees, directed by George Abbott and Stanley Donen, starring Tab Hunter, Gwen Verdon, Ray Walston
- Darby's Rangers, directed by William Wellman, starring James Garner
- The Deep Six, starring Alan Ladd, Dianne Foster, Efrem Zimbalist, Jr.
- The Defiant Ones, directed by Stanley Kramer, starring Tony Curtis and Sidney Poitier
- Desire (Touha) – (Czechoslovakia)
- Desire Under the Elms, starring Sophia Loren, Anthony Perkins, Burl Ives
- The Doctor's Dilemma, directed by Anthony Asquith, starring Dirk Bogarde (Britain)
- Dracula, starring Christopher Lee and Peter Cushing – (Britain)
- Dunkirk, starring John Mills and Richard Attenborough – (Britain)

=== E ===
- Édes Anna, directed by Zoltán Fábri – (Hungary)
- Elevator to the Gallows (Ascenseur pour l'échafaud), directed by Louis Malle, starring Jeanne Moreau – (France)
- Enchanted Island, starring Jane Powell
- Endless Desire (Hateshinaki yokubo), directed by Shōhei Imamura – (Japan)
- Equinox Flower (Higanbana), directed by Yasujirō Ozu – (Japan)

=== F ===
- The Fabulous World of Jules Verne (aka Vynález zkázy) – (Czechoslovakia)
- Fanfare – (Netherlands)
- Flood Tide, starring George Nader and Cornell Borchers
- A Flower in Hell (Jiokhwa) – (South Korea)
- The Fly, starring Vincent Price
- Fort Massacre, starring Joel McCrea
- From Hell to Texas, starring Don Murray, Diane Varsi, Dennis Hopper
- From the Earth to the Moon, starring Joseph Cotten

=== G ===
- The Geisha Boy, starring Jerry Lewis
- Giants and Toys (Kyojin to gangu) – (Japan)
- The Gift of Love, directed by Jean Negulesco, starring Lauren Bacall and Robert Stack
- Gigi, directed by Vincente Minnelli, starring Leslie Caron, Louis Jourdan, Maurice Chevalier
- Girl on the Run, starring Efrem Zimbalist, Jr.
- God's Little Acre, directed by Anthony Mann, starring Robert Ryan, Aldo Ray, Fay Spain, Tina Louise
- The Goddess, starring Kim Stanley
- Goha, starring Omar Sharif – (France/Tunisia)
- Gunman's Walk, starring Van Heflin, Tab Hunter, Kathryn Grant

=== H ===
- H8... – (Yugoslavia)
- The H-Man, directed by Ishirō Honda – (Japan)
- Harry Black, starring Stewart Granger and Barbara Rush – (UK/US)
- Hercules (Le fatiche di Ercole), starring Steve Reeves – (Italy)
- The Hidden Fortress (Kakushi toride no san akunin), directed by Akira Kurosawa, starring Toshiro Mifune – (Japan)
- High School Confidential, starring Russ Tamblyn, Jan Sterling, Mamie Van Doren
- The Horse's Mouth, starring Alec Guinness – (Britain)
- Hot Spell, starring Shirley Booth, Anthony Quinn, Shirley MacLaine, Eileen Heckart
- Houseboat, starring Cary Grant and Sophia Loren
- Howrah Bridge, starring Madhubala and Ashok Kumar – (India)
- The Hunters, starring Robert Mitchum

=== I ===
- I Accuse!, directed by and starring José Ferrer – (Britain)
- I Want to Live!, starring Susan Hayward (winner of Academy Award and Golden Globe for Best Actress)
- I Was Monty's Double, starring M. E. Clifton James and John Mills – (Britain)
- Ice Cold in Alex, directed by J. Lee Thompson, starring John Mills and Sylvia Syms – (Britain)
- The Idiot – (USSR)
- Imitation General, directed by George Marshall, starring Glenn Ford, Red Buttons, Taina Elg
- In Case of Adversity (En Cas de Malheur), starring Jean Gabin and Brigitte Bardot – (France)
- In the Money, starring the Bowery Boys
- Indiscreet, starring Cary Grant and Ingrid Bergman – (Britain)
- The Inn of the Sixth Happiness, directed by Mark Robson, starring Ingrid Bergman, Curd Jürgens, Robert Donat
- Intent to Kill, starring Richard Todd, Betsy Drake, Herbert Lom
- Iron Flower (Vasvirág) – (Hungary)
- It Happened in Broad Daylight (Es geschah am hellichten Tag) – (West Germany)
- It! The Terror from Beyond Space, directed by Edward L. Cahn, starring Marshall Thompson, Paul Langton and Ray Corrigan as the monster of the title
- Ivan the Terrible, Part Two (Ivan Grozniy), directed by Sergei Eisenstein, starring Nikolay Cherkasov – (U.S.S.R.)

=== J ===
- Jalsaghar (The Music Room), directed by Satyajit Ray – (India)
- Jamila, the Algerian, directed by Youssef Chahine, starring Magda and Salah Zulfikar – (Egypt)

=== K ===
- Kala Pani (Life Sentence), starring Dev Anand and Madhubala – (India)
- The Key, starring William Holden and Sophia Loren, based on Jan de Hartog novel – (Britain)
- King Creole, directed by Michael Curtiz, starring Elvis Presley, Dean Jagger, Vic Morrow, Walter Matthau

=== L ===
- Lafayette Escadrille, World War I film starring Tab Hunter, with an early appearance by Clint Eastwood
- Lake of the Dead (De dødes tjern) – (Norway)
- The Last Hurrah, starring Spencer Tracy, Jeffrey Hunter, Pat O'Brien, Basil Rathbone
- The Law and Jake Wade, starring Robert Taylor and Richard Widmark
- The Law Is the Law (La loi, c'est la loi), starring Totò and Fernandel – (France/Italy)
- The Left Handed Gun, starring Paul Newman
- The Light in the Forest, starring Fess Parker
- The Lineup, starring Eli Wallach
- Lonelyhearts, starring Montgomery Clift, Robert Ryan, Myrna Loy, Maureen Stapleton
- The Long, Hot Summer, directed by Martin Ritt, starring Paul Newman, Joanne Woodward, Orson Welles, Tony Franciosa, Lee Remick
- The Lovers (Les amants), directed by Louis Malle, starring Jeanne Moreau and Alain Cuny – (France)
- The Lovers of Montparnasse (Les Amants de Montparnasse), directed by Jacques Becker and Max Ophüls – (France)

=== M ===
- Machine-Gun Kelly, starring Charles Bronson, Susan Cabot and Morey Amsterdam
- Mädchen in Uniform (Girls in Uniform), starring Lilli Palmer and Romy Schneider (West Germany)
- Madhumati, directed by Bimal Roy, starring Vyjayanthimala in triple role and Dilip Kumar – (India)
- The Magician (Ansiktet), directed by Ingmar Bergman, starring Max von Sydow – (Sweden)
- Maigret Sets a Trap (film) (Maigret tend un piège), starring Jean Gabin – (France)
- The Man Inside, starring Jack Palance and Anita Ekberg – (Britain)
- A Man of Straw (L'uomo di paglia), directed by and starring Pietro Germi – (Italy)
- Man of the West, directed by Anthony Mann, starring Gary Cooper, Lee J. Cobb, Jack Lord, Julie London
- Marjorie Morningstar, starring Natalie Wood and Gene Kelly
- The Matchmaker, starring Shirley Booth and Shirley MacLaine
- A Matter of Dignity (To teleftaio psema), directed by Michael Cacoyannis, starring Ellie Lambeti – (Greece)
- Me and the Colonel, starring Danny Kaye
- Merry Andrew, starring Danny Kaye
- Les Misérables, starring Jean Gabin – (France)
- Mon Oncle, directed by and starring Jacques Tati – (France)
- Monster on the Campus, directed by Jack Arnold
- Murder by Contract, starring Vince Edwards

=== N ===
- The Naked Maja, starring Ava Gardner and Anthony Franciosa – (Italy/France/U.S.)
- Next to No Time, starring Kenneth More and Betsy Drake – (Britain)
- The Night Heaven Fell (Les Bijoutiers du Clair de Lune), directed by Roger Vadim, starring Brigitte Bardot – (France)
- A Night to Remember, directed by Roy Baker, starring Kenneth More – (Britain)
- No Time for Sergeants, directed by Mervyn LeRoy, starring Andy Griffith, Myron McCormick, Murray Hamilton, Nick Adams

=== O ===
- The Old Man and the Sea, based on the novel by Ernest Hemingway, starring Spencer Tracy
- Onionhead, starring Andy Griffith, Walter Matthau, Felicia Farr, Joey Bishop
- Orders to Kill, directed by Anthony Asquith, starring Eddie Albert – (Britain)
- The Outlaws (Oi paranomoi) – (Greece)

=== P ===
- Paris Holiday, starring Bob Hope and Anita Ekberg
- Party Girl, starring Cyd Charisse and Robert Taylor
- The Perfect Furlough, starring Tony Curtis and Janet Leigh
- Phagun, starring Madhubala and Bharat Bhushan – (India)
- Police, starring Madhubala and Pradeep Kumar – (India)
- The Proud Rebel, starring Alan Ladd and Olivia de Havilland

=== Q ===
- A Question of Adultery, directed by Don Chaffey, starring Julie London, Anthony Steel, Basil Sydney, Donald Houston – (U.K.)
- Queen of Outer Space, directed by Edward Bernds, starring Zsa Zsa Gabor, Eric Fleming, and Laurie Mitchell.
- The Quiet American, directed by Joseph L. Mankiewicz, starring Audie Murphy and Michael Redgrave

=== R ===
- Raj Tilak, remake of Vanjikottai Valiban, starring Gemini Ganesan, Vyjayanthimala and Padmini – (India)
- Rally 'Round the Flag, Boys!, starring Paul Newman, Joanne Woodward, Joan Collins
- The Reluctant Debutante, starring Rex Harrison, Kay Kendall, Sandra Dee
- The Revenge of Frankenstein, starring Peter Cushing – (Britain)
- The Rickshaw Man (Muhomatsu no issho), starring Toshiro Mifune – (Japan)
- Ride a Crooked Trail, starring Audie Murphy, Gia Scala, Walter Matthau
- Rock-A-Bye Baby, starring Jerry Lewis
- Rosaura at 10 O'Clock (Rosaura a las 10) – (Argentina)
- Run Silent, Run Deep, directed by Robert Wise, starring Clark Gable and Burt Lancaster

=== S ===
- Saddle the Wind, starring Robert Taylor, Julie London, John Cassavetes
- Sadhna, starring Vyjayanthimala and Sunil Dutt – (India)
- Screaming Mimi, starring Anita Ekberg
- Separate Tables, starring Rita Hayworth, Deborah Kerr, Burt Lancaster, David Niven
- The 7th Voyage of Sinbad, starring Kerwin Mathews
- The Sheepman, starring Glenn Ford and Shirley MacLaine
- The Sheriff of Fractured Jaw, starring Jayne Mansfield and Kenneth More – (Britain)
- The Sign of Zorro
- Sing, Boy, Sing, directed by Henry Ephron, starring Tommy Sands
- Solva Saal (Sixteenth Year), starring Dev Anand – (India)
- Some Came Running, directed by Vincente Minnelli, starring Frank Sinatra, Dean Martin, Shirley MacLaine
- South Pacific, directed by Joshua Logan, starring Mitzi Gaynor, Rossano Brazzi, John Kerr, Ray Walston
- Stage Struck, starring Henry Fonda and Susan Strasberg
- Stakeout on Dope Street, starring Abby Dalton
- St. Louis Blues, featuring Nat King Cole, Eartha Kitt, Cab Calloway, Ella Fitzgerald
- St. Peter's Umbrella (Szent Péter esernyöje) – (Hungary/Czechoslovakia)
- Summer Love, starring John Saxon and Jill St. John

=== T ===
- A Tale of Two Cities, starring Dirk Bogarde – (Britain)
- Tamango, starring Dorothy Dandridge
- Teacher's Pet, starring Clark Gable, Doris Day, Gig Young, Mamie Van Doren
- Ten North Frederick, starring Gary Cooper and Suzy Parker
- Terror in a Texas Town, starring Sterling Hayden
- This Happy Feeling, starring Debbie Reynolds, John Saxon, Alexis Smith
- Thunder Road, starring Robert Mitchum, Gene Barry, Keely Smith
- A Time to Love and a Time to Die, starring John Gavin
- The Tinder Box (Das Feuerzeug) – (East Germany)
- Tom Thumb, starring Russ Tamblyn and Terry-Thomas – (Britain/US)
- Too Much, Too Soon, starring Dorothy Malone, Efrem Zimbalist, Jr., Errol Flynn
- Torpedo Run, starring Glenn Ford and Ernest Borgnine
- Touch of Evil, directed by and starring Orson Welles, with Charlton Heston, Janet Leigh, Marlene Dietrich
- Tread Softly Stranger, starring Diana Dors – (Britain)
- The True Story of Lynn Stuart, starring Betsy Palmer
- The Tunnel of Love, starring Doris Day and Richard Widmark
- Twilight for the Gods, starring Rock Hudson and Cyd Charisse

=== U ===
- Underworld Beauty (Ankokugai no bijo) – (Japan)

=== V ===
- Vanjikottai Valiban (The Youth from Vanji Fort), starring Gemini Ganesan, Vyjayanthimala and Padmini – (India)
- Varan the Unbelievable (Daikaijū Baran), directed by Ishirō Honda – (Japan)
- Vengeance (La venganza), directed by Juan Antonio Bardem, starring Raf Vallone – (Spain)
- Vertigo, directed by Alfred Hitchcock, starring James Stewart and Kim Novak
- The Vikings, starring Kirk Douglas, Tony Curtis, Janet Leigh
- The Village on the River (Dorp aan de rivier) – (Netherlands)
- Virgin Island, starring John Cassavetes, Virginia Maskell and Sidney Poitier (UK)

=== W ===
- White Wilderness, a Disney nature film

=== Y ===
- The Young Lions, directed by Edward Dmytryk, starring Marlon Brando, Montgomery Clift, Dean Martin

== Film series ==
Carry On series (1958–1992)

== Short film series ==
- Looney Tunes (1930–1969)
- Terrytoons (1930–1969)
- Merrie Melodies (1931–1969)
- The Three Stooges (1934–1959)
- Bugs Bunny (1940–1964)
- Yosemite Sam (1945–1963)
- Speedy Gonzales (1953–1968)
- Woody Woodpecker (1940–1972)

Ending this year

- Droopy (1943-1958)
- Tom and Jerry (1940-1958)

== Births ==
- January 1 - Amy Morton, American actress and director
- January 3 - Simon Greenall, English actor, presenter, comedian, producer and writer
- January 4
  - Matt Frewer, Canadian-American actor, singer and comedian
  - Julian Sands, English actor (d. 2023)
- January 6 - Scott Bryce, American actor (d. 2026)
- January 7 - Linda Kozlowski, American former actress
- January 8 - George Jackson, American director and producer (d. 2000)
- January 11 - Alyson Reed, American actress
- January 20 – Lorenzo Lamas, American actor
- January 21 - Michael Wincott, Canadian actor
- January 26 – Ellen DeGeneres, American actress and comedian
- February 2 - Douglas McGrath, American screenwriter, director and actor (d. 2022)
- February 6
  - Cecily Adams, American actress and casting director (d. 2004)
  - Barry Miller, American actor
- February 10
  - Bess Motta, American actress and singer
  - Rupert Vansittart, English character actor
- February 12 - Michael Fenton Stevens, English actor and comedian
- February 13
  - Pernilla August, Swedish actress
  - Donal Gibson, American former actor
  - Tip Tipping, English stuntman and actor (d. 1993)
- February 15 - Shaun Toub, Iranian-American actor
- February 16
  - Ice-T, American rapper, songwriter, actor and producer
  - Lisa Loring, American actress (d. 2023)
- February 19
  - Leslie David Baker, American actor
  - Geoff Morrell, Australian actor
  - Pierre-Loup Rajot, French actor and director
- February 21
  - Kim Coates, Canadian-American actor
  - Denise Dowse, American actress and director (d. 2022)
  - Frank Renzulli, American actor, writer and producer
  - Jake Steinfeld, American actor and producer
- February 24 - Mark Moses, American actor
- February 25 - Barclay Hope, Canadian actor
- February 26
  - Greg Germann, American actor
  - Chris Phillips, American voice actor
- March 3
  - Bob Nelson, American stand-up comedian and actor
  - Miranda Richardson, English actress
- March 4 - Patricia Heaton, American actress
- March 7 - Rik Mayall, English actor, comedian and writer (d. 2014)
- March 9 - Linda Fiorentino, retired American actress
- March 10 – Sharon Stone, American actress and producer
- March 13 - Nicholas Eadie, Australian actor (d. 2025)
- March 14 - Russell Todd, American former actor
- March 18 - Christian Clemenson, American actor
- March 19
  - Robin Hurlstone, British actor (d. 2026)
  - Fred Stoller, American actor and stand-up comedian
- March 20 – Holly Hunter, American actress
- March 21 – Gary Oldman, English actor and filmmaker
- March 27 - Adrian Rawlins, English actor
- March 29 – Anu Lamp, Estonian actress
- March 30 - Maurice LaMarche, Canadian actor and stand-up comedian
- March 31
  - Tony Cox, American actor
  - Sylvester Groth, German actor
- April 2 - Mark Holton, American actor
- April 3
  - Alec Baldwin, American actor
  - Jaan Rekkor, Estonian actor
- April 4 - Constance Shulman, American actress
- April 14 – Peter Capaldi, Scottish actor, writer and director
- April 15 - Dario D'Ambrosi, Italian actor and filmmaker
- April 16 - Ricco Ross, American actor
- April 19 - Steve Antin, American actor, stunt performer, producer and director
- April 21
  - Genevieve Lemon, Australian actress and singer
  - Andie MacDowell, American actress
- April 26 - Giancarlo Esposito, American actor
- April 29
  - Laura Harrington, American actress and screenwriter
  - Savage Steve Holland, American director, writer, producer, animator and voice actor
  - Michelle Pfeiffer, American actress
- May 3 - Kevin Kilner, American actor
- May 7 – Mayra Alejandra, Venezuelan actress (d. 2014)
- May 9
  - Lorena Gale, Canadian actress (d. 2009)
  - Kristopher Kyer, American actor
  - Chuck Russell, American filmmaker and actor
- May 12
  - Kim Greist, retired American actress
  - Tony Oliver, Puerto Rican voice actor
- May 16
  - Laurie Bartram, American actress and ballet dancer (d. 2007)
  - Don Fullilove, American actor
- May 20
  - Judy Kuhn, American actress, singer and activist
  - Matt McCoy, American actor
- May 23
  - Drew Carey, American actor, voice actor, comedian, sports executive and game show host
  - Lea DeLaria, American comedian, actress and jazz singer
  - William Kircher, New Zealand actor
- May 25 - Jamie Foreman, English actor
- May 26 - Margaret Colin, American actress
- May 29
  - Annette Bening, American actress
  - Karen Maruyama, American actress and comedian
  - Wayne Duvall, American actor
- May 30 - Ted McGinley, American actor
- May 31 - Roma Maffia, American actress
- June 2 - Mike Binder, American filmmaker, stand-up comedian and actor
- June 6 - Danny Webb, English actor
- June 7 - Prince, American singer, songwriter, musician, and actor (d. 2016)
- June 8 - Keenen Ivory Wayans, American actor, comedian and filmmaker
- June 17
  - Bobby Farrelly, American director, screenwriter and producer
  - Kerry Shale, Canadian actor, voice-over artist and writer
- June 20 – Paul Poom, Estonian actor
- June 21
  - Michael Bowen, American actor
  - Eric Douglas, American actor and stand-up comedian (d. 2004)
  - Josh Pais, American actor
- June 22 – Bruce Campbell, American actor and director
- June 24 - Tommy Lister Jr., American character actor and professional wrestler (d. 2020)
- June 25 - Igal Naor, Israeli actor
- June 27 - August Schmölzer, Austrian actor and writer
- June 28 - Jeff Coopwood, American actor and singer
- June 29 - Jo Anderson, American actress
- July 4 – Tõnu Oja, Estonian actor
- July 6 – Jennifer Saunders, English comedian, screenwriter, singer and actress
- July 8
  - Kevin Bacon, American actor.
  - David Parfitt, English producer and actor
- July 10 - Fiona Shaw, Irish actress and theatre and opera director
- July 14 – Eva Arnaz, Indonesian actress
- July 27 - Vincenzo Nicoli, English-Italian actor
- July 28 - Michael Hitchcock, American actor, comedian, screenwriter and producer
- July 29 - Marcus Gilbert, British actor (d. 2026)
- July 30 - Richard Burgi, American actor
- August 3 – Lambert Wilson, French actor
- August 7
  - Shannon Cochran, American actress
  - Pete Smith, New Zealand actor (d. 2022)
  - Julian Wadham, English actor
- August 8 - Harry Crosby, American investment banker and former actor
- August 9 – Arvo Kukumägi, Estonian actor (d. 2017)
- August 10 - Don Swayze, American character actor
- August 15
  - Nicholas Bell, English actor
  - Roger Rose, American actor
  - Rondell Sheridan, American actor and director
- August 16
  - Angela Bassett, American actress
  - Madonna, American pop singer and actress
  - Toby Sedgwick, English actor and theatre director
- August 18
  - Reg E. Cathey, American character actor (d. 2018)
  - Frank L. Ridley, American actor (d. 2025)
  - Madeleine Stowe, American actress
- August 20 - David O. Russell, American director, screenwriter and producer
- August 22 – Colm Feore, Canadian actor
- August 23 - Ray Burdis, English actor, screenwriter, director and producer
- August 24 – Steve Guttenberg, American actor and comedian
- August 25 – Tim Burton, American director, producer and screenwriter
- August 26 - Wanda De Jesus, American character actress
- August 27 - Jean-Yves Berteloot, French actor
- August 29
  - Lenny Henry, British stand-up comedian, actor, singer, writer and television presenter
  - Michael Jackson, American pop singer and actor (d. 2009)
- August 31 - Julie Brown, American actress, comedian, writer, singer and director
- September 3 – Steve Schirripa, American actor
- September 6
  - Jeff Foxworthy, American actor, comedian, producer and writer
  - Michael Winslow, American actor, beatboxer, and comedian
- September 7 - Don Curry, American actor and stand-up comedian
- September 9 - Shaun Johnston, Canadian actor
- September 10 – Chris Columbus, American director, producer and screenwriter
- September 11 - Julia Nickson, American actress
- September 12 - Gregg Edelman, American actor
- September 15 - Wendie Jo Sperber, American actress (d. 2005)
- September 16 – Jennifer Tilly, Canadian-American actress
- September 20 - Ghassan Massoud, Syrian actor and filmmaker
- September 23 - Pat Skipper, American actor
- September 24 - Kevin Sorbo, American actor
- October 2
  - Daniel Peacock, English actor, director and writer
  - Jeffrey Weissman, American actor
- October 4
  - Ned Luke, American actor
  - Wendy Makkena, American actress
- October 9 – Michael Paré, American actor
- October 15 - Renée Jones, American former actress
- October 16 – Tim Robbins, American actor, screenwriter, producer and director
- October 19
  - Alexander Held, German actor (d. 2026)
  - Tiriel Mora, Australian actor
- October 20 – Viggo Mortensen, American actor
- October 25 - Phil Daniels, English actor
- November 1
  - Will Finn, American animator, voice actor, storyboard artist and director
  - Rachel Ticotin, American actress
- November 5 – Robert Patrick, American actor
- November 10 - Stephen Herek, American director
- November 11 - Scott Plank, American actor (d. 2002)
- November 12 - Megan Mullally, American actress, comedian and singer
- November 13 - John McConnell, American actor
- November 16 – Marg Helgenberger, American actress
- November 17 – Mary Elizabeth Mastrantonio, American actress and singer
- November 18 - Oscar Nunez, Cuban-American actor
- November 19 - Charlie Kaufman, American filmmaker
- November 21
  - David Reivers, Jamaican-American actor
  - Veena Sood, Canadian actress
- November 22 – Jamie Lee Curtis, American actress
- November 24 - Alain Chabat, French actor, comedian, director, screenwriter and producer
- November 28 - Thom Mathews, American actor
- December 5 - Shaun Prendergast, English actor and writer
- December 6 - Nick Park, British director, producer and animator
- December 9 - Raja Gosnell, American filmmaker and editor
- December 10 - David Paul Grove, Canadian actor
- December 11 - Tom Shadyac, American director, screenwriter and producer
- December 12 - Sheree J. Wilson, American actress
- December 13
  - Lynn-Holly Johnson, American retired figure skater and actress
  - Amy Stoch, American actress
- December 16 - Katie Leigh, American voice actress
- December 22 - Lenny Von Dohlen, American actor (d. 2022)
- December 25 - Cheryl Chase, American voice actress
- December 29 - Tyrone Benskin, English-Canadian actor
- December 30 – Pedro Costa, Portuguese director
- December 31
  - Johnny Hardwick, American actor and voice actor (d. 2023)
  - Bebe Neuwirth, American actress

== Deaths ==
- January 3 – Charles Williams, 59, American actor, writer, It's a Wonderful Life, Parole, Inc.
- January 11 – Edna Purviance, 62, American actress, The Kid, A Woman of Paris
- January 13 – Jesse L. Lasky, 77, American producer, Wings, The Cocoanuts
- February 13 – Helen Twelvetrees, 49, American actress, A Bedtime Story, Now I'll Tell
- February 15 – William Berke, 54, American director, Dick Tracy, FBI Girl
- February 17 – Tala Birell, 50, Romanian actress, Women in the Night, Dangerous Millions
- February 20 – Thurston Hall, 75, American actor, We Have Our Moments, Chain Gang
- February 27 – Harry Cohn, 66, American film executive, co-founder of CBC Sales Association (Columbia Pictures), Platinum Blonde, American Madness
- March 22
  - Mike Todd, 48, American producer, Around the World in 80 Days, This Is Cinerama
  - Art Cohn, 48, American screenwriter, The Set-Up, Ten Thousand Bedrooms
- March 31 – Nicholas Nayfack, 49, American producer, Escape from Fort Bravo, Forbidden Planet
- April 9 – Sol M. Wurtzel, 67, American producer, Charlie Chan in Rio, Bright Eyes
- April 15 – Estelle Taylor, 63, American actress, Cimarron, The Ten Commandments
- May 2 – Henry Cornelius, 44, South African director, Genevieve, I Am a Camera
- May 9 – Bill Goodwin, 47, American actor, announcer Mickey, The Atomic Kid
- May 19 – Ronald Colman, 67, British actor, Lost Horizon, Random Harvest
- June 6 – Virginia Pearson, 72, American actress, The Phantom of the Opera, The Wizard of Oz
- June 9 – Robert Donat, 53, British actor, The 39 Steps, Goodbye, Mr. Chips
- June 27 – Robert Greig, 78, Australian actor, They Just Had to Get Married, Love, Honor and Goodbye
- July 11 – Evelyn Varden, 65, American actress, The Night of the Hunter, Ten Thousand Bedrooms
- July 20 – Franklin Pangborn, 69, American actor, Never Give a Sucker an Even Break, The Bank Dick
- August 1 – Albert E. Smith, 83, English director and producer, co-founder of Vitagraph Studios
- August 8 – Barbara Bennett, 51, American actress, Black Jack, Syncopation
- August 18 – Bonar Colleano, 34, US-born British actor, Eight Iron Men, Joe MacBeth(car crash)
- August 21 – Kurt Neumann, 50, German director, The Fly, Mohawk
- August 27 – Priscilla Lawson, 44, American actress, Flash Gordon, Rose Bowl
- September 27 – Rose Stradner, 45, Austrian actress, The Last Gangster, The Keys of the Kingdom
- October 4 – Ida Wüst, 74, German actress, Chamber Music
- November 15 – Tyrone Power, 44, American actor, Witness for the Prosecution, The Mark of Zorro
- December 1 – Boots Mallory, 45, American actress, Sing Sing Nights, Here's Flash Casey
- December 20 – Elisabeth Risdon, 71, British actress, Florence Nightingale, Five Came Back
- December 21 – H. B. Warner, 83, British actor, Lost Horizon, It's a Wonderful Life

== Film debuts ==
- Hans Alfredson – A Difficult Parish
- Claudine Auger – Christine
- Steven Berkoff – I Was Monty's Double
- Richard Briers – Girls at Sea
- Richard Bright – Never Love a Stranger
- Claudia Cardinale – Goha
- Veronica Cartwright – In Love and War
- Bradford Dillman – A Certain Smile
- Peter Falk – Wind Across the Everglades
- Steve Franken – Cop Hater
- Piotr Fronczewski – Wolne miasto
- Charles Gray – I Accuse!
- Jerry Hardin – Thunder Road
- Nigel Hawthorne – Carve Her Name with Pride
- Ian Holm – Girls at Sea
- Lincoln Kilpatrick – Cop Hater
- Don Knotts – No Time for Sergeants
- Bernadette Lafont – La Tour, prends garde !
- Tina Louise – God's Little Acre
- Nadia Lutfi – Sultan
- Carol Lynley – The Light in the Forest
- Anna Massey – Gideon's Day
- Christopher Mitchum – Thunder Road
- Renzo Montagnani – Ricordati di Napoli
- Jack Nicholson – The Cry Baby Killer
- Michael Pataki – The Young Lions
- Suzanne Pleshette – The Geisha Boy
- Christopher Plummer – Stage Struck
- Diana Quick – The Brothers Karamazov
- Vanessa Redgrave – Behind the Mask
- Don Rickles – Run Silent, Run Deep
- Emmanuelle Riva – The Possessors
- Gena Rowlands – The High Cost of Loving
- Mitchell Ryan – Thunder Road
- Albert Salmi – The Brothers Karamazov
- Victor Spinetti – Behind the Mask
- Barbara Steele – Houseboat
- Dudley Sutton – A Night to Remember
- Vic Tayback – The Power of the Resurrection
- Renée Taylor – The Mugger
- Jack Weston – Stage Struck
- John Williams (film composer) – Daddy-O
