= List of French films of 1958 =

A list of films produced in France in 1958.

Title	Director	Cast	Genre	Notes
Adventures in Indochina	Jean Bastia	Jean Gaven, Dominique Wilms, Jean-Pierre Kérien	Adventure	
A Man Reflects On His Past	Willy Rozier	Jacques Bergerac, Barbara Rütting, Pierre Dudan	Adventure	Co-production with West Germany
Anna of Brooklyn	Vittorio De Sica	Gina Lollobrigida, Dale Robertson, Amedeo Nazzari	Comedy	Co-production with Italy
And Your Sister?	Maurice Delbez	Pierre Fresnay, Arletty	Comedy	
Back to the Wall	Édouard Molinaro	Jeanne Moreau, Gérard Oury, Philippe Nicaud	Crime	
Le Beau Serge	Claude Chabrol	Gérard Blain	Drama	2 wins
A Bullet in the Gun Barrel	Michel Deville, Charles Gérard	Pierre Vaneck, Mijanou Bardot, Paul Frankeur, Roger Hanin	Crime	
The Cat	Henri Decoin	Françoise Arnoul, Bernhard Wicki, André Versini	War	
A Certain Monsieur Jo	René Jolivet	Michel Simon, Geneviève Kervine, Jacques Morel	Crime	
Christine	Pierre Gaspard-Huit	Romy Schneider, Alain Delon	Drama, Romance	
Cigarettes, Whiskey and Wild Women	Maurice Régamey	Jean Carmet, Annie Cordy	Comedy	Co-production with Italy
Ciulinii Bărăganului	Louis Daquin, Gheorghe Vitanidis	Ana Vladescu	Drama	Co-production with Romania; Nominated for Palme d'Or; Top ratings in imdb (9,5)
Dangerous Games	Pierre Chenal	Jean Servais, Pascale Audret	Crime	
The Daughter of Hamburg	Yves Allégret	Daniel Gélin, Hildegard Knef, Jean Lefebvre	Drama	
The Day the Sky Exploded	Paolo Heusch	Paul Hubschmid, Fiorella Mari	SF	Co-produced with Italy
Dishonorable Discharge	Bernard Borderie	Eddie Constantine	Adventure, comedy	Co-production with Italy
Elevator to the Gallows	Louis Malle	Jeanne Moreau	Crime	
Every Day Has Its Secret	Claude Boissol	Jean Marais, Danièle Delorme, Françoise Fabian	Thriller	
Fire in the Flesh	Alfred Rode	Claudine Dupuis, Erno Crisa, Armand Mestral, Raymond Souplex	Adventure	
Girl and the River	François Villiers	Pascale Audret	Drama	Entered into the 1958 Cannes Film Festival
Girls of the Night	Maurice Cloche	Georges Marchal, Nicole Berger	Drama	Co-production with West Germany and Italy
Goha	Jacques Baratier	Omar Sharif	Drama	Entered into the 1958 Cannes Film Festival
Happy Arenas	Maurice de Canonge	Fernand Raynaud, Danielle Godet, Colette Ripert	Comedy	
Happy Holidays	Jean-Marc Thibault	Jean-March Thibault, Roger Pierre	Comedy	
Hardboiled Egg Time	Norbert Carbonnaux	Fernand Gravey, Darry Cowl	Comedy	
The Heartthrob	René Delacroix	Jacques Jouanneau, Denise Grey, Marthe Mercadier, Raymond Bussières	Comedy	
Incognito	Patrice Dally	Eddie Constantine, Danik Patisson, Gaby André, Tilda Thamar	Crime	
The Law Is the Law	Christian-Jaque	Totò, Fernandel	Comedy	Co-production with Italy; Entered into the 8th Berlin International Film Festival
A Legitimate Defense	André Berthomieu	Bernard Blier, Pierre Mondy, Philippe Nicaud, Maria Mauban	Crime	
Life Together	Clément Duhour	Fernandel, Danielle Darrieux, Lilli Palmer	Comedy	
The Lord's Vineyard	Jean Boyer	Fernandel, Pierre Dux, Simone Valère	Comedy	
Love Is My Profession	Claude Autant-Lara	Jean Gabin, Brigitte Bardot, Edwige Feuillère	Crime	Co-production with Italy
The Lovers	Louis Malle	Jeanne Moreau	Drama	Nominated for Golden Lion, +1 win
The Lovers of Montparnasse	Jacques Becker, Max Ophüls	Gérard Philipe	Biopic	Biopic of Modigliani
The Magic of the Kite	Roger Pigaut	Patrick de Bardine, Sylviane Rozenberg, Gérard Szymanski, Monique Hoa	Adventure fantasy	Co-production with China
Maigret Sets a Trap	Jean Delannoy	Jean Gabin, Annie Girardot	Crime	
The Mask of the Gorilla	Bernard Borderie	Lino Ventura, Charles Vanel, Pierre Dux, Bella Darvi	Crime	
Mimi Pinson	Robert Darèbe	Dany Robin, Raymond Pellegrin	Comedy	
Le Miroir à deux faces	André Cayatte	Michèle Morgan, Bourvil, Ivan Desny	Crime	Co-production with Italy
Les Misérables	Jean-Paul Le Chanois	Jean Gabin, Danièle Delorme	Drama	
Mon Oncle	Jacques Tati	Jacques Tati	Comedy	
My Darned Father	Georges Lacombe	Gaby Morlay, Antonella Lualdi, Claude Dauphin, Philippe Lemaire	Comedy	Co-production with Italy
Neither Seen Nor Recognized	Yves Robert	Louis de Funès, Noëlle Adam	Comedy	
The Night Affair	Gilles Grangier	Jean Gabin, Danielle Darrieux, Nadja Tiller	Crime	
The Night Heaven Fell	Roger Vadim	Brigitte Bardot, Alida Valli	Drama	
Not Delivered	Gilles Grangier	Paul Meurisse, Jeanne Moreau, Serge Reggiani, Simone Renant	Crime	
Operation Abduction	Jean Stelli	Frank Villard, Danielle Godet, Dalida	Crime	
Sacred Youth	André Berthomieu	Gaby Morlay, André Luguet, Micheline Dax, Guy Bertil	Comedy	
School for Coquettes	Jacqueline Audry	Dany Robin, Fernand Gravey, Bernard Blier	Comedy	
Serenade of Texas	Richard Pottier	Luis Mariano, Germaine Damar	Musical western	
Seventh Heaven	Raymond Bernard	Danielle Darrieux, Paul Meurisse, Alberto Sordi	Comedy	Co-production with Italy
The Sicilian	Pierre Chevalier	Fernand Raynaud	Comedy	
Sinners of Paris	Pierre Chenal	Charles Vanel, Bella Darvi, Danik Patisson, Michel Piccoli, François Guérin, Marcel Mouloudji	Crime	
The Stowaway	Lee Robinson, Ralph Habib	Martine Carol, Karlheinz Böhm, Roger Livesey, Serge Reggiani, Arletty	Adventure, Drama	Co-production with Australian
Sunday Encounter	Marc Allégret	Bourvil, Danielle Darrieux, Arletty	Comedy drama	
Tabarin	Richard Pottier	Michel Piccoli, Sylvia Lopez, Annie Cordy	Drama musical	Co-production with Italy
Tamango	John Berry	Dorothy Dandridge, Curd Jürgens	Drama	Made in France as director Berry was blacklisted in Hollywood
Taxi, Roulotte et Corrida	André Hunebelle	Louis de Funès, Raymond Bussières, Annette Poivre	Comedy	
That Night	Maurice Cazeneuve	Mylène Demongeot, Maurice Ronet, Jean Servais	Crime	
White Cargo	Georges Lacombe	Françoise Arnoul, Renée Faure, Jean-Claude Michel	Crime	
Why Women Sin	Guy Lefranc	Dany Carrel, Pierre Vaneck, Yves Denbiaud	Crime	
Women's Prison	Maurice Cloche	Danièle Delorme, Jacques Duby, Mireille Perrey	Crime	
Young Sinners	Marcel Carné	Pascale Petit	Drama	

== See also ==
- 1958 in France
- 1958 in French television
