= List of British films of 1958 =

A list of films produced in the United Kingdom in 1958 (see 1958 in film):

== 1958 ==
Title	Director	Cast	Genre	Notes
1958
The Adventures of Hal 5	Don Sharp		Adventure	
Another Time, Another Place	Lewis Allen	Lana Turner, Glynis Johns, Sean Connery	Drama	
Bachelor of Hearts	Wolf Rilla	Hardy Krüger, Sylvia Syms	Comedy	
The Bank Raiders	Maxwell Munden	Peter Reynolds, Sandra Dorne	Crime	
Battle of the V-1	Vernon Sewell	Michael Rennie, Patricia Medina	World War II	
Behind the Mask	Brian Desmond Hurst	Michael Redgrave, Tony Britton	Drama	
The Big Money	John Paddy Carstairs	Ian Carmichael, Belinda Lee	Comedy	
Blind Spot	Peter Maxwell	Robert MacKenzie, Delphi Lawrence	Drama	
Blood of the Vampire	Henry Cass	Donald Wolfit, Vincent Ball	Horror	
The Camp on Blood Island	Val Guest	André Morell, Carl Möhner	World War II	
Carry On Sergeant	Gerald Thomas	William Hartnell, Kenneth Williams	Comedy	
Carve Her Name with Pride	Lewis Gilbert	Virginia McKenna, Paul Scofield	World War II/spy	
Cat & Mouse	Paul Rotha	Lee Patterson, Ann Sears, Victor Maddern	Crime	
Chain of Events	Gerald Thomas	Dermot Walsh, Susan Shaw, Lisa Gastoni	Crime drama	
Chase a Crooked Shadow	Michael Anderson	Richard Todd, Anne Baxter	Thriller	
Corridors of Blood	Robert Day	Boris Karloff, Betta St. John	Horror	
A Cry from the Streets	Lewis Gilbert	Max Bygraves, Barbara Murray	Drama	Entered into the 1st Moscow International Film Festival
Davy	Michael Relph	Harry Secombe, Alexander Knox	Comedy/drama	
The Diplomatic Corpse	Montgomery Tully	Robin Bailey, Susan Shaw	Drama	
The Doctor's Dilemma	Anthony Asquith	Leslie Caron, Dirk Bogarde, Alastair Sim	Comedy/drama	
Dracula	Terence Fisher	Peter Cushing, Christopher Lee	Horror	
Dublin Nightmare	John Pomeroy	William Sylvester, Marla Landi, Richard Leech	Crime	
The Duke Wore Jeans	Gerald Thomas	Tommy Steele, Michael Medwin	Comedy	
Dunkirk	Leslie Norman	John Mills, Richard Attenborough	World War II	
Fiend Without a Face	Arthur Crabtree	Marshall Thompson, Kynaston Reeves	Sci-fi	
Floods of Fear	Charles Crichton	Howard Keel, Anne Heywood, Cyril Cusack	Action drama	
Further Up the Creek	Val Guest	David Tomlinson, Frankie Howerd	Comedy	
Gideon's Day	John Ford	Jack Hawkins, Cyril Cusack	Drama	
Girls at Sea	Gilbert Gunn	Guy Rolfe, Ronald Shiner	Comedy	
The Golden Disc	Don Sharp	Lee Patterson, Mary Steele	Musical	
The Gypsy and the Gentleman	Joseph Losey	Melina Mercouri, Flora Robson	Drama	
Happy Is the Bride	Roy Boulting	Ian Carmichael, Janette Scott	Comedy	
Harry Black	Hugo Fregonese	Barbara Rush, Stewart Granger	Drama	
The Haunted Strangler	Robert Day	Boris Karloff, Jean Kent	Horror	
Heart of a Child	Clive Donner	Jean Anderson, Donald Pleasence	Drama	
The Horse's Mouth	Ronald Neame	Alec Guinness, Kay Walsh	Comedy	
I Accuse!	José Ferrer	José Ferrer, Anton Walbrook	Drama	
I Only Arsked!	Montgomery Tully	Bernard Bresslaw, Michael Medwin	Comedy	
I Was Monty's Double	John Guillermin	M.E. Clifton-James, John Mills	World War II	
Ice Cold in Alex	J. Lee Thompson	John Mills, Anthony Quayle	World War II	Entered into the 8th Berlin International Film Festival
Indiscreet	Stanley Donen	Ingrid Bergman, Cary Grant	Romance/comedy	
Innocent Meeting	Godfrey Grayson	Sean Lynch, Beth Rogan	Crime	
Innocent Sinners	Philip Leacock	Flora Robson, David Kossoff	Drama	
Intent to Kill	Jack Cardiff	Richard Todd, Betsy Drake, Herbert Lom	Thriller	
The Key	Carol Reed	Trevor Howard, Sophia Loren	World War II	
A Lady Mislaid	David MacDonald	Phyllis Calvert, Thorley Walters	Comedy	
Law and Disorder	Charles Crichton	Michael Redgrave, Robert Morley	Comedy	
Links of Justice	Max Varnel	Jack Watling, Sarah Lawson	Crime	
The Long Knife	Montgomery Tully	Joan Rice, Sheldon Lawrence	Crime	
The Man Inside	John Gilling	Jack Palance, Anita Ekberg	Crime	
The Man Upstairs	Don Chaffey	Bernard Lee, Richard Attenborough	Drama	
The Man Who Wouldn't Talk	Herbert Wilcox	Anna Neagle, Anthony Quayle	Crime	
Man with a Gun	Montgomery Tully	Lee Patterson, Rona Anderson	Crime	
Mark of the Phoenix	Maclean Rogers	Julia Arnall, Sheldon Lawrence	Thriller	
Moment of Indiscretion	Max Varnel	Ronald Howard, Lana Morris	Crime	
The Moonraker	David MacDonald	George Baker, Sylvia Syms, Marius Goring	Historical action	
The Naked Earth	Vincent Sherman	Richard Todd, Juliette Gréco	Drama	
Next to No Time	Henry Cornelius	Kenneth More, Betsy Drake	Comedy	
A Night to Remember	Roy Ward Baker	Kenneth More, Ronald Allen, Honor Blackman	Drama	
No Time to Die	Terence Young	Victor Mature, Leo Genn	World War II	
Nor the Moon by Night	Ken Annakin	Joan Brickhill, Michael Craig	African drama	
Nowhere to Go	Seth Holt	George Nader, Maggie Smith, Bernard Lee	Crime	
On the Run	Ernest Morris	Neil McCallum, Susan Beaumont, William Hartnell	Crime drama	
Orders to Kill	Anthony Asquith	Eddie Albert	World War II	
Passionate Summer	Rudolph Cartier	Virginia McKenna, Bill Travers	Romance	
Passport to Shame	Alvin Rakoff	Diana Dors, Herbert Lom	Drama	
A Question of Adultery	Don Chaffey	Julie London, Anthony Steel	Drama	
The Revenge of Frankenstein	Terence Fisher	Peter Cushing, Francis Matthers	Horror	
Rooney	George Pollock	John Gregson, Muriel Pavlow	Comedy	
The Safecracker	Ray Milland	Ray Milland, Barry Jones	Crime/World War II	
The Salvage Gang	John Krish		Children's adventure	
Sea Fury	Cy Endfield	Stanley Baker, Victor McLaglen	Drama	
Sea of Sand	Guy Green	Michael Craig, John Gregson, Richard Attenborough	World War II	
The Secret Man	Ronald Kinnoch	Marshall Thompson, John Loder	Thriller	
She Didn't Say No!	Cyril Frankel	Eileen Herlie, Perlita Neilson	Comedy	
The Sheriff of Fractured Jaw	Raoul Walsh	Kenneth More, Jayne Mansfield	Comedy/western	
The Silent Enemy	William Fairchild	Laurence Harvey	World War II	
The Snorkel	Guy Green	Peter Van Eyck, Betta St. John	Drama	
The Son of Robin Hood	George Sherman	David Hedison,June Laverick	Swashbuckler	
The Spaniard's Curse	Ralph Kemplen	Tony Wright, Lee Patterson	Drama	
Stormy Crossing	C. M. Pennington-Richards	John Ireland, Derek Bond	Mystery	
The Strange Awakening, aka Female Fiends	Montgomery Tully	Lex Barker, Carole Mathews	Mystery	
The Strange World of Planet X	Gilbert Gunn	Forrest Tucker, Gaby André	Sci-fi	
A Tale of Two Cities	Ralph Thomas	Dirk Bogarde, Dorothy Tutin	Literary drama	
Them Nice Americans	Anthony Young	Bonar Colleano, Vera Day	Comedy	
Tread Softly Stranger	Gordon Parry	Diana Dors, George Baker	Crime	
The Trollenberg Terror	Quentin Lawrence	Forrest Tucker, Laurence Payne	Science fiction	
The Two-Headed Spy	André de Toth	Jack Hawkins, Gia Scala	Thriller	
Undercover Girl	Francis Searle	Paul Carpenter, Kay Callard	Crime	
Up the Creek	Val Guest	David Tomlinson, Peter Sellers	Comedy	
Violent Playground	Basil Dearden	Stanley Baker, Anne Heywood	Drama	
Virgin Island	Pat Jackson	John Cassavetes, Virginia Maskell, Sidney Poitier	Drama	
The Whole Truth	John Guillermin	Stewart Granger, George Sanders	Thriller	
The Wind Cannot Read	Ralph Thomas	Dirk Bogarde, Yoki Tani, Ronald Lewis, John Fraser	World War II	
A Woman of Mystery	Ernest Morris	Dermot Walsh, Hazel Court	Crime	
Wonderful Things!	Herbert Wilcox	Frankie Vaughan, Jeremy Spenser	Romance	
The Young and the Guilty	Peter Cotes	Phyllis Calvert, Andrew Ray	Drama	

== See also ==
- 1958 in British music
- 1958 in British television
- 1958 in the United Kingdom
