= List of Japanese films of 1958 =

A list of films released in Japan in 1958 (see 1958 in film).

Japanese films released in 1958
Title	Director	Cast	Genre	Notes
Anzukko	Mikio Naruse	So Yamamura; Kyōko Kagawa	Drama	
The Ballad of Narayama	Keisuke Kinoshita	Kinuyo Tanaka, Teiji Takahashi	Jidaigeki	
Black Cat Mansion	Nobuo Nakagawa	Toshio Hosokawa, Midori Chikuma	—	
A Boy and Three Mothers	Seiji Hisamatsu	Terumi Niki, Isuzu Yamada		
Conflagration	Kon Ichikawa	Raizo Ichikawa; Tatsuya Nakadai	—	
Endless Desire	Shohei Imamura	Shizuko Kasagi	Comedy	
Equinox Flower	Yasujirō Ozu	Shin Saburi; Kinuyo Tanaka	Drama	
The Gay Masquerade	Daisuke Itō	Raizo Ichikawa		
Ghost-Cat Wall of Hatred	Kenji Misumi	Shintaro Katsu		
Giants and Toys	Yasuzo Masumura	Hiroshi Kawaguchi	Comedy	
The H-Man	Ishirō Honda	Yumi Shirakawa	Science fiction	
Herringbone Clouds (Summer Clouds)	Mikio Naruse	Kyōko Kagawa; Michiyo Aratama	Drama	
The Hidden Fortress	Akira Kurosawa	Toshirō Mifune	Samurai	
Hitogui Ama ("Cannibal Ama")	Yoshiki Onoda	Yōko Mihara	Shintoho ama film	
A Holiday in Tokyo	Kajiro Yamamoto	Yoshiko Yamaguchi; Toshirō Mifune	Drama	
The Invisible Wall	Hideo Ōba	Keiji Sada, Yachiyo Ōtori, Shinji Takano, Yukiji Asaoka	Crime Mystery	
Josei S.O.S.	Hisanobu Marubayashi	Yumi Shirakawa, Yoshio Tsuchiya		
Kegareta Nikutai Seijo (Priestess with the Sullied Flesh)	Michiyoshi Doi	Miyuki Takakura, Mayumi Ôzora	Drama	
The Lowest Man	Yasuzō Masumura	Hiroshi Kawaguchi, Hitomi Nozoe, Kyôko Kishida, Keiko Arijima	Crime	
The Loyal 47 Ronin	Kunio Watanabe	Kazuo Hasegawa	Jidaigeki	
Naked Sun	Miyoji Ieki	Shinjirō Ehara	Drama	
Nichiren to mōko daishūrai	Kunio Watanabe	Kazuo Hasegawa	Drama	
Night Drum	Tadashi Imai	Rentarō Mikuni, Ineko Arima	Drama	
Nishi Ginza Station	Shohei Imamura	Frank Nagai	Drama	
Points and Lines	Tsuneo Kobayashi	Hiroshi Minami, Isao Yamagata, Mieko Yamagata, Yoshi Katô, Takashi Shimura	Mystery	
The Precipice	Yasuzô Masumura	Kenji Sugawara, Fujiko Yamamoto, Hitomi Nozoe, Keizô Kawasaki, Kyû Sazanka, Ken Uehara	Drama	
Queen Bee	Tetsu Taguchi	Naoko Kubo, Shôji Nakayama, Shigeru Amachi, Yōko Mihara	Crime	
Rat Kid on Journey	Hiroshi Inagaki	Kōji Tsuruta; Mitsuko Kusabue	Jidaigeki	
Rickshaw Man	Hiroshi Inagaki	Toshirō Mifune; Hideko Takamine	Drama	
The Snowy Heron	Teinosuke Kinugasa	Fujiko Yamamoto, Keizo Kawasaki		
Song for a Bride	Ishirō Honda	Mitsuko Kusabue; Akemi Negishi		
The Spell of the Hidden Gold	Masazumi Kawanishi	Yasuko Nakada; Kumi Mizuno	Drama	
Stolen Desire	Shohei Imamura	Osamu Takizawa		
The Temptress and the Monk	Eisuke Takizawa	Yumeji Tsukioka	Fantasy	
Theater of Life (Jinsei gekijo - Seishun hen)	Toshio Sugie	Ryō Ikebe; Hisaya Morishige	Drama	
Tora's Home Run	Motoyoshi Oda	Kingoro Yanagiya; Ichiro Arishima	Comedy	
Underworld Beauty	Seijun Suzuki	Hideaki Nitani	Crime	
Varan the Unbelievable	Ishirō Honda	Kozo Nomura	Keiji	
Voice Without a Shadow	Seijun Suzuki	Hideaki Nitani	Mystery	
Yaji and Kita On the Road	Yasuki Chiba	Keiju Kobayashi; Daisuke Katō	Comedy	
Young Daughters	Kihachi Okamoto	Izumi Yukimura; Daisuke Katō	Drama	
Young Breasts	Seijun Suzuki	Akira Kobayashi	Drama	
Zenta and the Three Tales: Child in the Wind				
Zenta and the Three Tales: The World of Ghosts				

== See also ==
- 1958 in Japan
