= Five Graves to Cairo =

1943 film by Billy Wilder

- Theatrical release poster
- Directed by: Billy Wilder
- Written by: Charles Brackett; Billy Wilder
- Based on: Hotel Imperial by Lajos Bíró
- Produced by: B. G. DeSylva
- Starring: Franchot Tone; Anne Baxter; Akim Tamiroff; Erich von Stroheim
- Cinematography: John F. Seitz
- Edited by: Doane Harrison
- Music by: Miklós Rózsa
- Production company: Paramount Pictures
- Distributed by: Paramount Pictures
- Release date: May 4, 1943
- Running time: 96 minutes
- Country: United States
- Language: English
- Budget: $855,000 (estimated)
- Box office: $1,650,000 (US rentals)

Five Graves to Cairo is a 1943 American war film directed and co-written by Billy Wilder and starring Franchot Tone, Anne Baxter, Akim Tamiroff and Erich von Stroheim. It is based on the 1917 stage play Hotel Imperial by Hungarian dramatist Lajos Bíró, which had previously been adapted into a 1927 silent film and a 1939 sound film. As the original play was written during the First World War, the film relocates the story's events to the North Africa front of the then-ongoing Second World War.

The film was released by Paramount Pictures on May 4, 1943. At the 16th Academy Awards, Five Graves to Cairo was nominated three categories: Best Cinematography, Best Film Editing and Best Art Direction.

== Plot ==
Corporal John Bramble is the sole survivor of a British tank crew after Erwin Rommel and his Afrika Korps capture Tobruk in June 1942 and pursue the British into Egypt. He stumbles across the North African desert into the town of Sidi Halfaya, where he finds the Empress of Britain, a small, isolated hotel owned by Farid. The only other employee is the French chambermaid Mouche, as the cook fled with the British and the waiter Davos was killed the night before by German bombing.

Farid hides the now-unconscious Bramble when the swiftly advancing Germans take over the hotel to use as headquarters for Field Marshal Rommel and his staff. Bramble assumes the identity of Davos to save himself. When Rommel summons him to a private chat, Bramble is stunned to discover that Davos was a valued German spy, but manages to play along. He learns that he is to be sent to Cairo next.

Later, he steals a pistol from genial, music-loving Italian General Sebastiano, planning to serve the field marshal a bullet rather than coffee the next morning. Not wanting trouble, Mouche steals the pistol and waits on Rommel herself. When some captured British officers are brought to the hotel for a luncheon with Rommel, one of them (a past guest) realizes that Davos has been replaced. Bramble privately explains who he is and what he plans to do. The officer orders him to use his position of trust to gather military intelligence instead.

At the luncheon, Rommel teases his guests, allowing them to ask him twenty questions about his future plans. Bramble listens with interest. From the conversation and later remarks by Rommel, he eventually deduces that the field marshal, disguised as an archeologist before the war, had secretly prepared five hidden supply dumps, the "Five Graves to Cairo", for the conquest of Egypt. The final piece of the puzzle (their locations) falls into place when Bramble realizes that Rommel's cryptic references to points Y, P, and T refer to the precise locations of the letters of the word "Egypt" printed on his map.

Meanwhile, Bramble and Mouche clash. She despises the British, believing they abandoned the French, including her two brothers, at Dunkirk. He in turn becomes disgusted at how she plays up to the Germans. As it turns out, Mouche's motives are not mercenary; she pleads with Rommel to release her wounded soldier brother from a concentration camp. He is unmoved, but his aide, Lieutenant Schwegler, is more appreciative of her charms. He pretends to help her, showing her fake telegrams to and from Germany.

That night however, when everyone takes shelter in the cellar during an Allied air raid, Schwegler discovers the body of the real Davos (identified by his clubfoot), uncovered by the bombing. In the noise and confusion of the raid, Schwegler chases Bramble through the darkened hotel, before Bramble kills the German and hides the body in Mouche's part of the servants' room. When Mouche finds out, she threatens to unmask him. However, she has a change of heart. Schwegler's body is soon found, and Rommel accuses her of killing his aide when she discovered he was lying about trying to get her brother released. To protect Bramble, Mouche confirms this. Bramble leaves for Cairo, but arranges for Farid to present evidence the next day at Mouche's trial that "Davos" committed the crime.

Bramble's information allows the British to blow up the dumps and thus thwart Rommel's plans, culminating in the Second Battle of El Alamein. When Bramble returns to Sidi Halfaya in triumph with his unit, he learns the Germans executed Mouche, even though she was exonerated of Schwegler's murder, because she would not stop saying that the British would be back. Bramble takes the parasol he bought her in Cairo, something she always wanted, and places it to provide shade for her grave.

== Cast ==
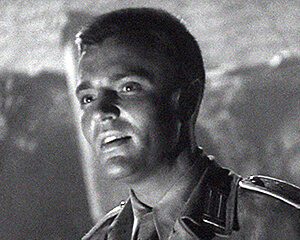
Peter van Eyck in the Five Graves to Cairo trailer.

Credits from the AFI Catalog of Feature Films:

- Franchot Tone as Corporal John Bramble
- Anne Baxter as Marie-Jacques "Mouche" Claire
- Akim Tamiroff as Farid
- Fortunio Bonanova as General Sebastiano
- Peter van Eyck as Lieutenant Schwegler
- Erich von Stroheim as Field Marshal Erwin Rommel
- Konstantin Shayne as Colonel von Bulow
- Fred Nurney as Major Lamprecht
- Miles Mander as Colonel Fitzhume
- Ian Keith as Captain St. Bride
- Leslie Denison as Captain McOwen
- Bud Geary as Sergeant Harrison

== Production ==
Production lasted from January 4 to February 20, 1943. It was filmed at Paramount Studios, Hollywood, California, with some exteriors of Sidi Halfaya (a fictionalized version of Sidi Barrani) shot on location at the Salton Sea and other exteriors filmed at Camp Young at the Army Desert Training Center, Indio, California, where, with the cooperation of the Army Ground Forces, a battle sequence was staged, and in Yuma, Arizona.

A Hollywood Reporter news item reported that in November 1942, David O. Selznick had agreed to lend Ingrid Bergman for this film. However, Paramount instead borrowed Anne Baxter from Twentieth Century-Fox. Simone Simon also tested for the role.

The German tanks in the film are American M2 light tanks, which were used for training, while British forces at the time had the American M3 Medium tank.

== Reception ==
Bosley Crowther of The New York Times gave the film a mixed review. He admired one performance, writing, "... von Stroheim has all other movie Huns backed completely off the screen" and " ... whenever he appears in this picture, ... , he gives you the creeps and the shivers. Boy, what a nasty Hun!" However, he was less than impressed with the rest, complaining, "As though this fanciful story weren't sufficiently hard to take, Charles Brackett and Billy Wilder, a couple of old-hand Paramount wags, have dressed it up with shenanigans which have the flavor of fun in a haunted house." "It has a little something for all tastes, provided you don't give a darn." The Variety magazine response was more generous, calling it "a dynamic, moving vehicle" and praising Wilder's handling of "the varied story elements, countless suspenseful moments and vivid portrayals in excellent fashion." Dave Kehr of the Chicago Reader agreed, characterizing the film as a "crisp spy thriller" and, as Wilder's second stint at directing, "Excellent apprentice work, with many Wilder themes seething beneath the surface."

In 2008, Quentin Tarantino listed Five Graves to Cairo as his 10th favorite film of all time.

== Real-life connection ==
Brigadier Dudley Clarke, the commander of the British deception department based in Cairo, saw Five Graves to Cairo in January 1944 and was inspired to create Operation Copperhead. General Bernard Montgomery had recently been transferred from North Africa to England to take command of the ground forces intended for the Normandy invasion. Clarke located a look-alike, pre-war actor Lieutenant M. E. Clifton James, and had him study Montgomery's appearance and mannerisms. The actor then made public visits to several Mediterranean bases in the guise of Montgomery just a few days before D-Day in an attempt to convince German intelligence that an Allied attack on northern Europe was not imminent. Though the ruse did not appear to have any significant impact on German plans, the events of Operation Copperhead were in turn dramatized in a book and a movie, both titled I Was Monty's Double.

== Home media ==
The film is available on VHS, DVD and Blu-ray.
