= Operation Copperhead =

1944 military deception operation

Copperhead
- Part of Operation Bodyguard
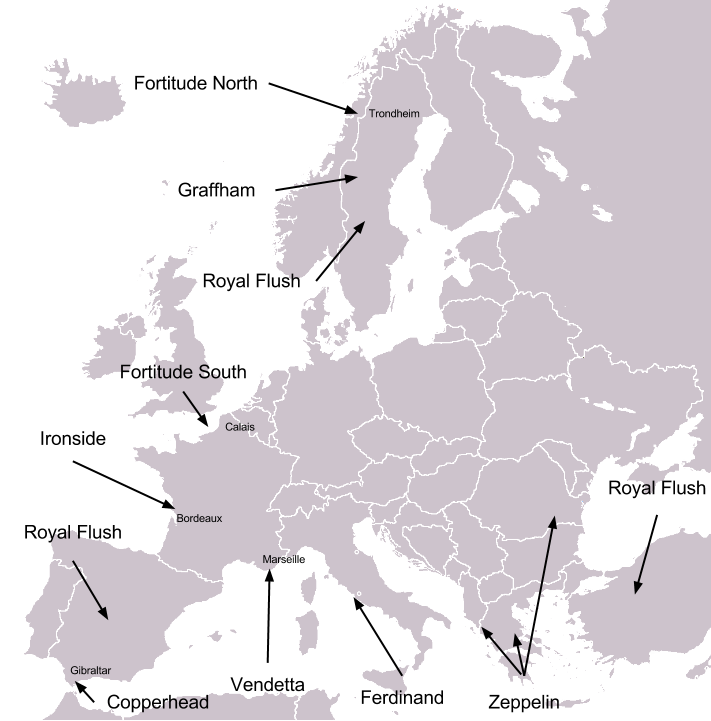
- Copperhead formed one of the subordinate plans of Operation Bodyguard
- Operational scope: Strategic deception
- Location: Gibraltar, Algiers
- Planned: 1944
- Planned by: Dudley Clarke, London Controlling Section
- Objective: To confuse German intelligence as to the location of the proposed D-Day landings.
- Date: 26 May 1944

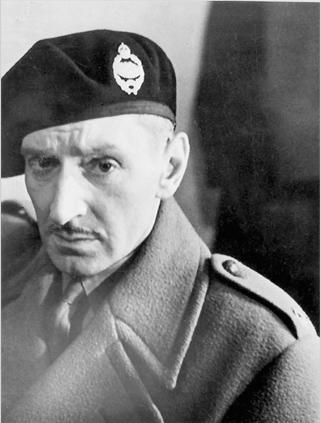
Clifton James, in the guise of Montgomery, 1944

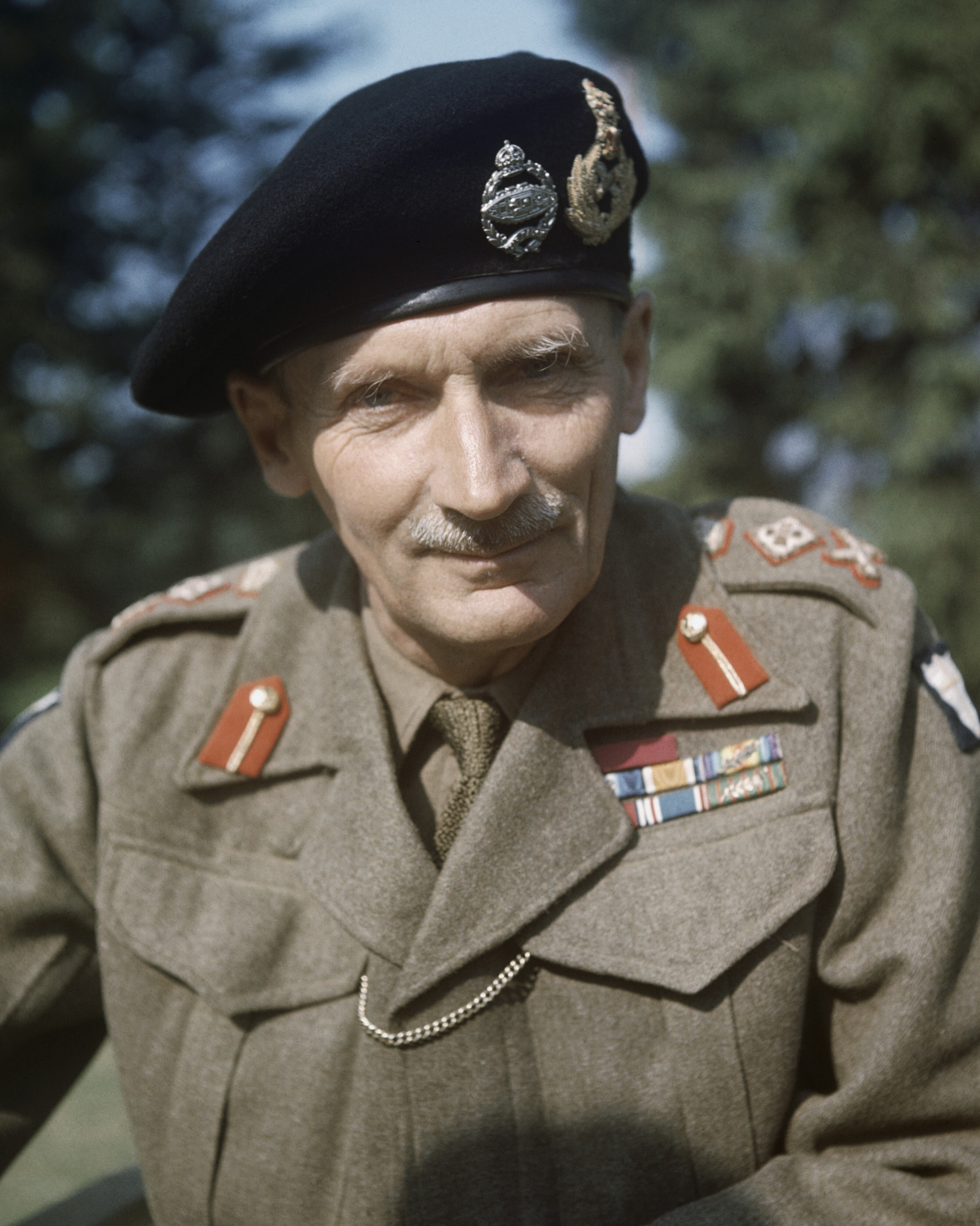
Montgomery, photographed in 1943

Operation Copperhead was a small military deception operation run by the British during the Second World War. It formed part of Operation Bodyguard, the cover plan for the invasion of Normandy in 1944 and was intended to mislead German intelligence as to the location of General Bernard Montgomery. The operation was conceived by Dudley Clarke in early 1944 after he watched the film Five Graves to Cairo. Following the war M. E. Clifton James wrote a book about the operation, I Was Monty's Double. It was later adapted into a film, with James in the lead role.

The German high command expected Montgomery (one of the best-known Allied commanders) to play a key role in any cross-Channel bridgehead. Clarke and the other deception planners reasoned that a high-profile appearance outside the United Kingdom would suggest that an Allied invasion was not imminent. An appropriate look-alike was found, M. E. Clifton James, who spent a short time with Montgomery to familiarise himself with the general's mannerisms. On 26 May 1944, James flew first to Gibraltar and then to Algiers, making appearances where the Allies knew German intelligence agents would spot him. He then flew secretly to Cairo and remained in hiding until Montgomery's public appearance in Normandy following the invasion.

The operation did not appear to have any significant impact on German plans and was not reported high up the chain of command. It was executed some time before D-Day, and in the midst of several other Allied deceptions. German intelligence may have suspected a trick, or attributed little importance to the visit.

== Background ==
In preparation for the 1944 invasion of Normandy, the Allied nations conducted a complex series of deceptions under the codename Bodyguard. The overall aim of the plan was to confuse the German high command as to the exact location and timing of the invasion. Significant time was spent constructing the First United States Army Group, a fictitious army, to threaten Pas de Calais, along with political and visual deceptions to communicate a fictitious Allied battle plan. Copperhead was a small portion of Bodyguard conceived by Dudley Clarke. Earlier in the war Clarke had pioneered the idea of strategic deception, forming a deception department in Cairo named 'A' Force. Clarke and 'A' Force were not officially in charge of Bodyguard planning (a role that fell to the London Controlling Section), but because of the location of the deception the Cairo planners organised much of the operation.

On a visit to Naples in January 1944, Clarke had seen the movie Five Graves to Cairo, in which actor Miles Mander makes a brief appearance. The film involves one character impersonating another and Clarke suggested attempting the same trick in real life. He proposed an operation to mislead German commanders as to Montgomery's location in the days immediately before the Normandy landings (codenamed Operation Neptune).

Montgomery was one of the most prominent Allied commanders and the German high command expected him to be present for any invasion of France. Clarke hoped Montgomery's apparent presence in Gibraltar and Africa would lend support to the idea that the Allies might be planning landings in southern France, as part of Operation Vendetta, rather than across the Channel. While in London, in February 1944, Clarke, the London Controlling Section and Ops (B) drafted Copperhead in support of Vendetta.

== Operation ==
Mander, the actor from Five Graves to Cairo, was located in Hollywood but found to be too tall in real life. Another look-alike was identified but before he could be drafted into the operation he broke a leg in a motorbike accident. Eventually, Lieutenant-Colonel J. V. B. Jervis-Reid, head of Ops (B), spotted a photograph of M. E. Clifton James in the News Chronicle. James, an Australian, had spent 25 years as an actor before the war, and at the time was assigned to the Royal Army Pay Corps. Colonel David Niven, a well-known British actor, was asked to contact James and offer him a screen test for future army films. When he arrived at the meeting, James was told his true role.

James was not a perfect stand-in for Montgomery. He had lost a finger during the First World War, so a prosthetic had to be made. He had also never flown before, so the London Controlling Section's Dennis Wheatley took James up for a test flight to make sure he did not suffer from air sickness. Finally, James both drank heavily and smoked cigars, while Montgomery was a teetotaler and disliked smoking. The deception planners were worried that James might be spotted drinking, spoiling the performance. Despite these hitches, and with Montgomery's approval, the plan went forward. To get into character, James spent some time with the general, posing as a journalist, to study his mannerisms.

Allied deceivers used their double agent network to circulate the idea that Montgomery would command ground forces during the invasion. Then, on 26 May 1944, James flew overnight from RAF Northolt to Gibraltar, where the Germans maintained an observation post overlooking the airport from across the Spanish border. The plane had to circle for an hour before landing to allow James, who had smuggled a bottle of gin onto the flight, to sober up. He then attended breakfast with the British governor, Sir Ralph Eastwood, before departing again for the airfield. The Allies had arranged for Ignacio Molina Pérez, a Spanish envoy known to be a German spy, to visit Government House. After observing James's departure, Pérez hurriedly crossed the border to place a call to his German handler.

James then flew to Algiers, where he was publicly paraded through the airport and driven to meet General Maitland Wilson, ostensibly for a meeting to discuss operations against the south of France. Instead, he was moved quietly to a remote villa by 'A' Force's Rex Hamer. Rumours suggest this was because James had been spotted smoking and staggering around Algiers, so the deceivers decided to cut his appearances short. Whatever the reason, James was flown to Cairo the next day, out of character. He was to remain hidden there until the public disclosure of Montgomery's presence in France. Meanwhile, double agents in North Africa were used to extend the masquerade for a few more days by hinting Montgomery was still in the region.

== Impact ==
The impact of Copperhead is unclear. The visit was reported up the German chain of command, and some double agents later received requests for information about Montgomery's movements. There is no indication that Montgomery's appearance affected German views of the imminent invasion threat. Writing in 2011, historian Joshua Levine attributes this to the fact that the deception was carried out ten days before D-Day, arguing that there would be no reason for a flying visit to North Africa to preclude an imminent invasion.

Another factor was that, in early May 1944, an uncontrolled agent based in Spain (who sold fictional intelligence to the Germans) had passed on details of a meeting in Gibraltar between several high-ranking Allied officers. Documents found after the war indicate that the Germans found this information suspect, and may have treated Montgomery's appearance as equally so. Although double agents received several urgent requests from the Abwehr about his whereabouts, it does not appear that this information was passed on to the German command in France. According to captured enemy generals, German intelligence in fact believed Montgomery had been present but still assumed it to be part of a feint. The Bodyguard deception had confused the German command as to Allied intentions, and the apparent arrival of Montgomery in Gibraltar added little to the picture.

James did not enjoy the experience. Although he received equivalent pay (£10 per day) to Montgomery during the operation, it was a stressful assignment. After Montgomery's public appearance on the Normandy beachhead, James flew back to England and resumed his role within the Pay Corps and was warned not to discuss the operation. Dennis Wheatley, in his memoirs, commented that he felt James had been treated "shabbily" for his efforts.

== Later depictions ==
In 1954 James wrote an account of the operation, I Was Monty's Double (published in the United States as The Counterfeit General). The British government made no attempt to stop publication, and in 1958 the book was adapted into a film of the same name. James starred as himself, alongside John Mills as an intelligence agent.

== See also ==
- Operation Mincemeat – British Second World War deception operation
- Operation Bodyguard – World War II deception plan during the build-up to the 1944 Normandy landings
