= List of Italian films of 1958 =

A list of films produced in Italy in 1958 (see 1958 in film):

Title	Director	Cast	Genre	Notes
1958
Addio per sempre!				
Adorabili e bugiarde				
Afrodite, dea dell'amore				
Amore a prima vista				
Amore e guai				
Anche l'inferno trema				
Anna of Brooklyn	Vittorio De Sica, Carlo Lastricati	Gina Lollobrigida, Amedeo Nazzari, Dale Robertson	Comedy	Entered into the 8th Berlin International Film Festival
Antigone				
Arrivederci Firenze				
Arrivederci Roma				
Avventura nell'arcipelago				
Ballerina e Buon Dio				
Big Deal on Madonna Street (I soliti ignoti)	Mario Monicelli		Commedia all'italiana	Huge success. It was remade by Louis Malle in Crackers (1984 film)
Calypso				
Canne al vento				
Capitan Fracassa				
Capitan Fuoco				
Caporale di giornata				
Carosello di canzoni				
Casa di bambola				
The Challenge (La sfidia)	Francesco Rosi	José Suárez, Rosanna Schiaffino	Drama	Rosi's debut. Venice Award. 2 Nastro d'Argento
Christine				
Civitas Dei				
Colonie Sicedison				
Come te movi, te fulmino!				
Cortina di cristallo				
Così è (se vi pare)				
The Day the Sky Exploded	Paolo Heusch	Paul Hubschmid, Fiorella Mari	SF	Co-produced with France
The Defeated Victor	Paolo Heusch			Entered into the 9th Berlin International Film Festival
Domenica è sempre domenica				
È permesso Maresciallo				
El Alamein				
El hereje				
El hombre del paraguas blanco				
El pasado te acusa				
Fiesta en el Caribe				
Fortunella				
Gagliardi e pupe				
Gambe d'oro				
The Gambler	Claude Autant-Lara	Gérard Philipe	Drama	French/Italian co-production
Giochi di colonia				
Giovane canaglia				
Giovani mariti				
Girls of the Night				
Gli avventurieri dell'Uranio				
Gli italiani sono matti				
Gli zitelloni				
Graditi ospiti				
Grigio				
Guardia, ladro e cameriera				
Hercules	Pietro Francisci	Steve Reeves, Sylva Koscina, Gianna Maria Canale	Sword and sandal	Huge success. Based on the Greek epic poem Argonautica by Apollonius of Rhodes
I picchiatelli				
I prepotenti				
I soliti ignoti				
Il bacio del sole				
Il cavaliere senza terra				
Il frumento				
Il marito				
Il mercato comune europeo				
Il novelliere: The picture of Dorian Gray				
Il pianto delle zitelle				
Il pirata dello sparviero nero				
Il pittore del sogno				
Il romanzo di un giovane povero				
Il segreto delle rose				
Il serpente a sonagli				
Il teatro dei ragazzi				
Il terribile Teodoro				
In Case of Adversity	Claude Autant-Lara	Jean Gabin, Brigitte Bardot	Crime	French/Italian co-production
Io, mammeta e tu				
India: Matri Bhumi	Roberto Rossellini		Documentary	
Italia in Patagonia				
L'amore nasce a Roma				
L'incanto della foresta				
L'ultima canzone				
L'uomo di paglia				
La bigorne				
La Gerusalemme liberata				
La legge è legge				
La Mina				
La Morte viene dallo spazio				
La muraglia cinese				
La nipote Sabella				
La notte di San Giovanni				
La passe du diable				
La ragazza di piazza San Pietro				
La redenzione				
La rivolta dei gladiatori				
La sfida				
La spada di Damocle				
La spada e la croce				
La sposa				
La strada lunga un anno				
La tempesta				
La Tour, prends garde!				
La Trieste di Saba				
La Venere di Cheronea				
La venganza				
La Violetera				
Ladro lui, ladra lei	Luigi Zampa	Alberto Sordi, Sylva Koscina	Comedy	
The Law Is the Law	Christian-Jaque			Entered into the 8th Berlin International Film Festival
Le dritte				
Le fatiche di Ercole				
Le Miroir à deux faces				
Le piège				
Le septième ciel				
Les amants de Montparnasse (Montparnasse)				
Les bijoutiers du clair de lune				
Les jeux dangereux				
Les Misérables				
Les tricheurs				
Love and Chatter (Amore e chiacchiere)	Alessandro Blasetti	Vittorio De Sica, Gino Cervi	Comedy	
The Love Specialist (La ragazza del palio)	Luigi Zampa	Diana Dors, Vittorio Gassman, Franca Valeri	Comedy	
Maigret tend un piège				
Mamma perché mi hai fatto così bello? (Carmela è una bambola)				
A Man of Straw (L'uomo di paglia)	Pietro Germi			Entered into the 1958 Cannes Film Festival
Marinai, donne e guai				
Melodie a Sant'Agata				
Mia nonna poliziotto				
Mogli pericolose				
Mon coquin de père				
Mon oncle				
Nackt, wie Gott sie schuf				
The Naked Maja	Henry Koster	Ava Gardner, Anthony Franciosa	Adventure	
Non sono più Guaglione				
Paese d'America				
Pastori a Orgosolo				
Pescherecci				
Pezzo, capopezzo e capitano				
Pia de' Tolomei				Pia de' Tolomei
Polikuschka				
Premier mai				
Primo amore				
Promesse di marinaio				
Quand sonnera midi				
Quando gli angeli piangono				
Questa mia donna				
Racconti d'estate				
Ranocchio				
Rascel marine				
Resurrection	Rolf Hansen	Horst Buchholz, Myriam Bru		
Ricordati di Napoli				
Ricordi Pucciniani				
Romarei, das Mädchen mit den grünen Augen				
Sans famille				
Serenatella sciuè sciuè				
Sergente d'ispezione				
Seventh Heaven	Raymond Bernard	Danielle Darrieux, Paul Meurisse, Alberto Sordi	Comedy	Co-production with France
Si le roi savait ça				
Simone Martini				
Sogno a Venezia				
Sorella acqua				
Sorrisi e canzoni				
Tabarin				
Tamango				
Tant d'amour perdu				
Tapum! La storia delle armi				
Te doy mi vida				
Teatro Umberto				
This Angry Age	René Clément	Anthony Perkins, Silvana Mangano, Richard Conte	Drama	
Thérèse Étienne				
Toi... le venin				
Totò a Parigi				
Totò e Marcellino				
Totò nella luna				
Totò, Peppino e le fanatiche				
Tre fili fino a Milano				
Tre straniere a Roma				
Turandot				
Umiliati e offesi				
Un amore senza fine				
Un flauto in paradiso				
Un giorno in Barbagia				
Un uomo facile				
Une vie				
Valentino				
Valeria ragazza poco seria				
Venezia città minore				
Vento di primavera				
Vento notturno				
Via col para... vento				
Young Husbands (Giovani mariti)	Mauro Bolognini			Entered into the 1958 Cannes Film Festival
