= List of Soviet films of 1958 =

A list of films produced in the Soviet Union in 1958 (see 1958 in film).

== 1958 ==
Title	Russian title	Director	Cast	Genre	Notes
1958
And Quiet Flows the Don	Тихий Дон	Sergei Gerasimov	Pyotr Glebov, Elina Bystritskaya, Zinaida Kiriyenko	Drama	
Beloved Beauty	Краса ненаглядная	Vladimir Degtyaryov	Erast Garin, Georgiy Vitsin	Animation	
The Captain's Daughter	Капитанская дочка	Vladimir Kaplunovskiy	Oleg Strizhenov	Drama	
The City Turns the Lights On	Город зажигает огни	Vladimir Vengerov	Nikolay Pogodin	Drama	
The Communist	Коммунист	Yuli Raizman	Yevgeni Urbansky, Sofia Pavlova, Boris Smirnov	Drama	
E.A. — Extraordinary Accident	Ч. П. — Чрезвычайное происшествие	Viktor Ivchenko	Mikhail Kuznetsov, Aleksandr Anurov, Vyacheslav Tikhonov, Taisia Litvinenko, Anatoly Solovyev, Giuli Chokhonelidze	Drama	
A Girl with Guitar	Девушка с гитарой	Alexander Feinzimmer	Lyudmila Gurchenko	Comedy	
Great Is My Country	Широка страна моя	Roman Karmen		Documentary	
A Groom from the Other World	Жених с того света	Leonid Gaidai	Rostislav Plyatt, Georgy Vitsin, Vera Altayskaya, Rina Zelyonaya	Comedy, short	
Hard Happiness	Трудное счастье	Aleksandr Stolper	Mikhail Kozakov	Drama	
The Idiot	Идиот	Ivan Pyryev	Yuri Yakovlev, Yuliya Borisova, Nikita Podgorny, Vera Pashennaya, Sergey Martinson	Drama	
It Happened in Penkovo	Дело было в Пенькове	Stanislav Rostotsky	Maya Menglet, Svetlana Druzhinina, Vyacheslav Tikhonov	Romantic drama	
Ivan Brovkin on the State Farm	Иван Бровкин на целине	Ivan Lukinsky	Leonid Kharitonov	Comedy	
The Last Inch	Последний дюйм	Nikita Kurikhin and Teodor Vulfovich	Vladislav Muratov	Drama	
Life in Your Hands	В твоих руках жизнь	Nikolai Rozantsev	Oleg Strizhenov	Drama	
The Magpie	Сорока-воровка	Naum Trakhtenberg	Zinaida Kirienko	Drama	
Mister X	Мистер Икс	Yuli Khmelnitsky	Georg Ots	Musical	
My Beloved	Дорогой мой человек	Iosif Kheifits	Aleksey Batalov	Drama	
October Days	В дни октября	Sergei Vasilyev	Vladimir Chestnokov	Drama	
Other People's Children	Чужие дети	Tengiz Abuladze	Tsitsino Tsitsishvili, Otar Koberidze	Drama	
Over Tissa	Над Тиссой	Dmitri Vasilyev	Afanasi Kochetkov, Tatyana Konyukhova, Nina Nikitina, Andrey Goncharov	Crime	
Poem of the Sea	Поэма о море	Yuliya Solntseva	Boris Livanov	Drama	
Two Fyodors	Два Фёдора	Marlen Khutsiev	Vasily Shukshin	Drama	
The Variegateds Case	Дело 'пестрых'	Nikolai Dostal	Andrei Abrikosov	Drama	
Time of Taiga Snowdrop	Пора таёжного подснежника	Yaropolk Lapshin	Valentina Dagbayeva	Drama	
Volunteers	Добровольцы	Yuri Egorov	Mikhail Ulyanov	Drama	

== See also ==
- 1958 in the Soviet Union
