= 1958 in French television =

This is a list of French television related events from 1958.

== Events ==
- 12 March – France wins the 3rd Eurovision Song Contest in Hilversum, Netherlands. The winning song is "Dors, mon amour" performed by André Claveau. The year marks the first time the contest was won by the male solo singer.

== Television shows ==
=== 1940s ===
- Le Jour du Seigneur (1949–present)

=== 1950s ===
- A la découverte des Français
- Le Club du jeudi (1950–1961)
- Magazine féminin (1952–1970)
- Lectures pour tous (1953–1968)
- La Boîte à sel (1955–1960)
- La Piste aux étoiles (1956–1978)
- Voyage sans passeport (1957–1969)

== Births ==
- 23 January – Christophe Dechavanne, TV personality

== See also ==
- 1958 in France
- List of French films of 1958
