= 1958 in France =

- Decades: 1930s; 1940s; 1950s; 1960s; 1970s
- See also: History of France; Timeline of French history; List of years in France

Events from the year 1958 in France.

== Incumbents ==
- President: Rene Coty
- President of the Council of Ministers:
  - until 14 May: Félix Gaillard
  - 14 May-1 June: Pierre Pflimlin
  - starting 1 June: Charles de Gaulle

== Events ==
- 1 January
  - The European Economic Community comes into being.
  - Carrefour group set up.
- 13 May – Crisis caused by putsch attempt in Algiers involving French officers.
- 1 June – Charles de Gaulle is brought out of retirement at Colombey-les-Deux-Églises to lead France by decree for six months.
- 4 June – Charles de Gaulle visits Algeria.
- 28 September – A majority of 79% says yes to the constitution of the French Fifth Republic.
- 2 October – Guinea declares itself independent from France, rejecting the new French constitution.
- 4 October – The new Constitution of France is signed into law, establishing the French Fifth Republic.
- 3 November – New UNESCO building inaugurated in Paris.
- 23 November – Legislative Election held.
- 25 November – French Sudan gains autonomy as a self-governing member of the French Community.
- 28 November – Chad, the Republic of the Congo, and Gabon become autonomous republics within the French Community.
- 30 November – Legislative Election held, to elect the first National Assembly of the Fifth Republic.
- 1 December – Central African Republic becomes independent from France.
- 21 December – Presidential Election won by Charles de Gaulle with 78.5% of the votes.

== Arts and literature ==
- Yves Klein releases his work IKB74 (one of his monochrome blue panels in his signature blue).

== Sport ==
- 26 June – Tour de France begins.
- 19 July – Tour de France ends, won by Charly Gaul of Luxembourg.

== Births ==
- 19 January – Thierry Tusseau, international soccer player
- 6 April – Pascal Lecamp, politician
- 26 July – Thierry Gilardi, football and rugby commentator (died 2008)
- 16 August – Anne L'Huillier, atomic physicist and Nobel Prize laureate
- 31 August – Éric Zemmour, political journalist and author
- 2 September – Olivier Grouillard, racing driver
- 21 September – Bruno Fitoussi, poker player
- 2 October – Didier Sénac, footballer
- 26 October – Pascale Ogier, actress (died 1984)
- 24 November – Alain Chabat, actor and director

== Deaths ==
- 13 February – Georges Rouault, painter and printmaker (born 1871)
- 14 August – Frédéric Joliot-Curie, physicist and Nobel laureate (born 1900)
- 22 August – Roger Martin du Gard, author, winner of the 1937 Nobel Prize for Literature (born 1881)
- 20 September – Jacques Delannoy, footballer (born 1912)
- 23 September – Robert Mercier, footballer (born 1909)
- 11 October – Maurice de Vlaminck, painter, printmaker and author (born 1876)

== See also ==
- 1958 in French television
- List of French films of 1958
