= It's Not My Business =

1962 film

- Directed by: Jean Boyer
- Written by: Jean Boyer; Jacques Vilfrid
- Starring: Fernand Raynaud; Jean Poiret; Micheline Dax
- Cinematography: Jacques Robin
- Edited by: Jacqueline Brachet
- Music by: Charles Aznavour; Georges Garvarentz
- Production company: Les Films Marceau
- Distributed by: Cocinor
- Release date: 7 November 1962
- Running time: 90 minutes
- Country: France
- Language: French

It's Not My Business (French: C'est pas moi, c'est l'autre) is a 1962 French comedy film directed by Jean Boyer and starring Fernand Raynaud, Jean Poiret and Micheline Dax.

The film's sets were designed by the art director Robert Giordani.

== Cast ==
- Fernand Raynaud as Fernand Raynaud/Gaspard
- Jean Poiret as Jean Duroc
- Micheline Dax as Paula
- Geneviève Kervine as Monique
- Henri Virlojeux as Pierjan
- Robert Piquet as Le ténor
- Gélou as Miss Betty, la twisteuse
- Michel Seldow as L'illusionniste
- Max Elloy as L'huissier
- Max Montavon as Ludovic Morin, le pianiste et le batteur de la tournée
- Jean Droze as Le régisseur de la tournée
- Lucien Guervil as Le patron de l'hôtel du cheval blanc
- Jean Balthasar as Le chauffeur de car
- Fred Pasquali as L'imprésario

== Bibliography ==
- Alfred Krawc. International Directory of Cinematographers, Set- and Costume Designers in Film: France (from the beginnings to 1980). Saur, 1983.
