= I Was Monty's Double =

Book by M. E. Clifton James

- First edition cover
- Author: M. E. Clifton James
- Language: English
- Publisher: Rider and Company
- Publication date: 1954
- Publication place: United Kingdom

I Was Monty's Double (released in the US as The Counterfeit General Montgomery) is a book by M. E. Clifton James, first published in London in 1954. It was made into a film in 1958, directed by John Guillermin, from a screenplay adapted by Bryan Forbes. It tells the story of Operation Copperhead: James had an uncanny resemblance to Bernard Montgomery in real life, and he was used to impersonate Montgomery to confuse the Germans during the Second World War.

== Film vs book ==
The film broadly follows the account by James in his book of the same name, but according to James, there was no attempt to kidnap him. The German High Command did plan to have him killed, but Hitler vetoed the plan until he could be sure where the landings would actually take place.

Gibraltar was in reality a hotbed of German agents, and James/Montgomery was spied on by several operatives who were smuggled into Gibraltar specifically to discover what "Monty" was up to. James/Montgomery deliberately talked nonsense about non-existent operations and plans, in the hope that the spies would overhear and take such information seriously. According to some accounts, the plan was brought to an abrupt end when James, still in disguise as Montgomery, was seen in public drunk and smoking, while the real Montgomery was a teetotaling non-smoker.

== Satires ==
- The Goon Show broadcast a parody episode entitled I Was Monty's Treble on 10 November 1958 (9th series, show 2).
- In 1959, Cecil Parker and Leslie Phillips appeared in a spoof version, The Night We Dropped a Clanger (known as Make Mine a Double in the U.S.), alongside Brian Rix.
- The 1961 film On the Double, starring Danny Kaye, was also a take-off of I Was Monty's Double, in which Kaye plays the twin roles of the General and the private who (comically but successfully) impersonates him.
- The 1989 Jason Connery film Casablanca Express freely borrows from the original tale, but with Churchill as the kidnap target. Glenn Ford appears briefly as a character resembling Gen. Williams.
- British satirical magazine Private Eye carried a spoof version of the War Picture Library graphic novels entitled "Battle for Britain", a satire on then-current British political issues, most notably the miners' strike. The author was credited as "Monty Stubble", a pun on Monty's Double.

== See also ==
- The Man Who Never Was
