= Time of Taiga Snowdrop =

- Russian: Пора таёжного подснежника
- Directed by: Yaropolk Lapshin
- Starring: Valentina Dagbayeva; Buda Vampilov; Mariya Stepanova; Naydan Gendunova; Buyanto Ayushin
- Cinematography: Vasili Kirbizhekov
- Music by: Yuriy Levitin
- Release date: 1958
- Country: Soviet Union
- Language: Russian

Time of Taiga Snowdrop (Russian: Пора таёжного подснежника) is a 1958 Soviet drama film directed by Yaropolk Lapshin.

== Plot ==
The film takes place after the October Revolution. The Red Army soldiers stop at the Akhsai farm and observe the inhuman attitude of the owner of the family, Akhsay, towards his bride and younger brother. Meanwhile, the White Guards are developing a plan for the defeat of the Red Army detachment.

== Cast ==
- Valentina Dagbayeva as Dynsema
- Buda Vampilov as Akhsay
- Mariya Stepanova as Zhalmasu
- Naydan Gendunova as Shabgansa
- Buyanto Ayushin as Sodnom
- Vladimir Kadochnikov
- Raisa Kurkina as Anna
- Yuri Leonidov as Stepan
- Vladimir Manketov as Gylyk
- Pyotr Nikolayev as Galsan
- Fyodor Sakhirov as Bair
- Tsyren Shagzhin as Tikhonya
