= Mimi Pinson (1958 film) =

1958 film

- Directed by: Robert Darène
- Written by: Maurice Aubergé; Marie-José Darène
- Produced by: Raymond Horvilleur; Jean Hébey
- Starring: Dany Robin; Raymond Pellegrin; Micheline Dax
- Cinematography: Marcel Weiss
- Edited by: Germaine Artus
- Music by: Michel Emer; Francis Lemarque
- Production company: Hergi Films
- Distributed by: Les Films Fernand Rivers
- Release date: 23 July 1958
- Running time: 95 minutes
- Country: France
- Language: French

Mimi Pinson is a 1958 French comedy film directed by Robert Darène and starring Dany Robin, Raymond Pellegrin and Micheline Dax. It draws some inspiration from the poem of the same name by Alfred de Musset.

== Cast ==
- Dany Robin as Mimi Pinson
- Raymond Pellegrin as Frédéric de Montazel
- Jacqueline Cadet as Tounette
- Micheline Dax as Mme. Louise
- Patrick Dewaere as Le frère de Mimi
- Marc Doelnitz as Valentin
- Roger Dumas as Pierrot
- Mireille Granelli as Patricia
- Denise Grey as La grand-mère
- Robert Hirsch as Jean-Lou
- André Luguet as Stevenson
- Gina Manès as Une vielle dame
- Frédéric O'Brady as Keratopoulo
- Louisette Rousseau

== Bibliography ==
- Dayna Oscherwitz & MaryEllen Higgins. The A to Z of French Cinema. Scarecrow Press, 2009.
