= Micheline Dax =

French actress & singer (1924–2014)

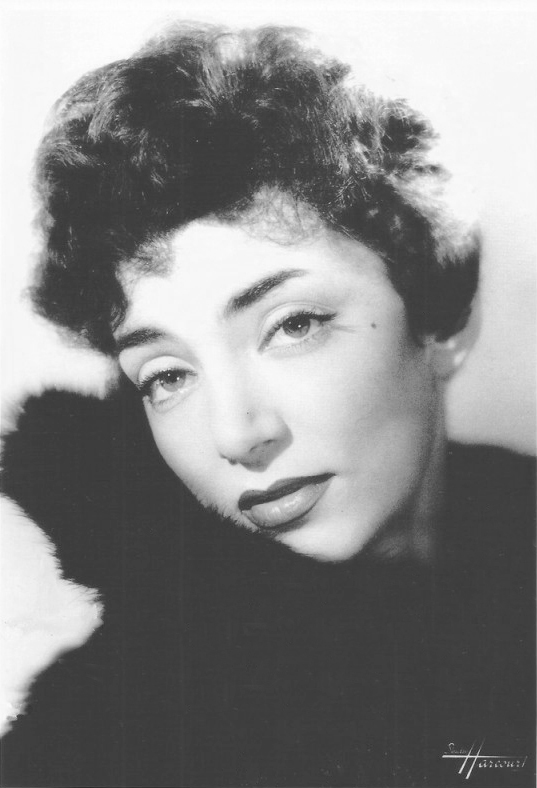
- Micheline Dax (1954)
- Born: Micheline Josette Renée Etevenon; 3 March 1924; Paris, France
- Died: 27 April 2014 (aged 90) near Paris, France
- Occupation: Actress

Micheline Dax (3 March 1924 – 27 April 2014) was a French film and stage actress, singer, and whistler. She did the voice to Ursula in the French dub in Disney's "The Little Mermaid".

The Paris-born actress was born Micheline Josette Renée Etevenon. She died on 27 April 2014, aged 90, near Paris.

== Filmography ==
=== Selected filmography ===
- Branquignol (1949) .... Aurélie de la Molette
- Rue de l'Estrapade (1953) ... Denise
- Women of Paris (1953) .... La snob indécise
- Ah! Les belles bacchantes (1954) .... Petit rôle (uncredited)
- Pas de souris dans le business (1955)
- La villa Sans-Souci (1955) .... Mme Jarewski
- M'sieur la Caille (1955)
- If Paris Were Told to Us (1956) .... Yvette Guilbert
- Don Juan (1956) .... Doña Elvira
- Short Head (1956) ... Lola d'Héricourt
- The Seventh Commandment (1957) .... La brune remplaçante
- Printemps à Paris (1957)
- Miss Catastrophe (1957) .... Olga
- A Friend of the Family (1957) .... Tante Zezette
- This Pretty World (1957) .... Lulu
- Mimi Pinson (1958) .... Madame Louise
- Sacrée jeunesse (1958) .... Mathilde Billard
- The Bureaucrats (1959) .... Gaby
- Love and the Frenchwoman (1960) .... Lulu (segment "Enfance, L'")
- À rebrousse-poil (1961) .... Charlotte
- Le pavé de Paris (1961) .... La fille à la prison
- It's Not My Business (1962) .... Paula
- Six in Paris (1965) .... Prostitute (segment "Rue Saint-Denis")
- Les mordus de Paris (1965)
- A nous deux, Paris! (1966) .... Carmen
- Tender Scoundrel (1966) .... Marjorie
- Le grand bidule (1967) .... Lola Gopec
- Asterix and Cleopatra (1968) .... Cleopatra (voice)
- La honte de la famille (1969) .... Célestine Maspie
- Ces messieurs de la gâchette (1970) .... La directrice de l'usine
- Tintin and the Lake of Sharks (1972) .... Bianca Castafiore (voice)
- A Slightly Pregnant Man (1973) .... Madame Corfa
- La dernière bourrée à Paris (1973) .... La propriètaire de l'appartement
- Vos gueules les mouettes! (1974) .... Mme Le Marlec
- Flat Out (1975) .... Chantal Moreau
- L'acrobate (1976) .... Mme Lamour
- The Twelve Tasks of Asterix (1976) .... High Priestess (voice)
- Le grand fanfaron (1976) .... La colonelle Popoti
- En cas de guerre mondiale, je file à l'étranger (1983) .... L'animatrice TV
- Lucky Luke (1984-1985, TV Series) .... Calamity Jane (voice)
- The Little Mermaid (1989) .... Ursula (voice)
- Pentimento (1989) .... Christiane
- Les clés du paradis (1991) .... Olga
- Tom and Jerry: The Movie (1992) .... Aunt Pristine Figg (voice)
- La joie de vivre (1993) .... Muguette
- Violetta la reine de la moto (1997) .... Rita
- L'Ex-femme de ma vie (2004) .... Madame Belin
- Max & Co (2008) .... Madame Doudou (voice)
- Park Benches (2009) .... The philosophe
- La femme invisible (d'après une histoire vraie) (2009) .... Mamie

=== Television ===
- La Vie parisienne (1967) (as Metella), directed by Yves-André Hubert (television version of 1958 stage production by Jean-Louis Barrault).
- Les Monos (2003 - Season 1, Episode 10) ... Germaine

== Awards ==
- 1999 Nominated for Molière Award for Best Supporting Actress (Frederick or the Crime Boulevard)
- 2004 Nominated for Molière Award for Best Actress (Driving Miss Daisy)
