= Keiji =

- Pronunciation: Keiji

Origin
- Origin: Japanese
- Region of origin: Japanese

Keiji (けいじ, ケイジ) is a Japanese given name usually used for males. Meaning varies depending on the kanji characters used.

== Written forms ==
Common kanji used include:

- 啓=
- 啓治
- 圭二
- 圭司
- 慶次
- 慶治
- 敬二
- 敬治
- 佳司
- 佳次

== People with the name ==
- Keiji Fujiwara (藤原 啓治; 1964–2020), Japanese actor and voice actor
- Keiji Fukuda (福田 敬二; born 1955), Japanese-American physician and epidemiologist
- Keiji Furuya (古屋 圭司; born 1952), Japanese politician
- Keiji Gotoh (後藤 圭二; born 1968), Japanese anime director, character designer and manga artist
- Keiji Haino (灰野 敬二; born 1952), Japanese musician and singer-songwriter
- Keiji Hase (長谷 景治; born 1925), Japanese swimmer
- Keiji Hirose (廣瀬 佳司; born 1973), Japanese former rugby union player
- Keiji Honda (本多 圭司; born 1957), Japanese businessman
- Keiji Imai (今井 慶二; 1917–1994), Japanese sprinter
- Keiji Inafune (稲船 敬二; born 1965), Japanese video game producer, character designer, game designer and businessman
- Keiji Inai (井内 啓二; born 1976), Japanese composer, arranger and orchestrator
- Keiji Ishizuka (石塚 啓次; born 1974), Japanese former football player
- Keiji Kaimoto (海本 慶治; born 1972), Japanese former football player
- Keiji Katayama (片山 圭二; 1976 or 1977), Japanese baseball coach
- Keiji Kawamori (河盛 慶次), Japanese member of the The Black Mages
- Keiji Kikkawa (吉川 圭二; 1935–2013), Japanese theoretical physicist
- Keiji Kojima (小嶋 敬二; born 1969), Japanese cyclist
- Keiji Kokuta (穀田 恵二; born 1947), Japanese politician
- Keiji Kotomitsuki (琴光喜 啓司; born 1976), Japanese former professional sumo wrestler
- Keiji Kuraishi (倉石 圭二; born 1982), Japanese professional football manager and former footballer
- Keiji Kuroki (黒木 啓司; born 1980), Japanese former dancer and actor
- Keiji Maeda (前田 慶次; 1543–1612), Japanese samurai lord of the Sengoku period
- Keiji Matsumoto (松本 恵二; 1949–2015), Japanese racing driver
- Keiji Mitsuneyama (三根山 宝國; 1922–1989), Japanese sumo wrestle
- Keiji Mizumoto (水本 圭治; born 1988), Japanese canoeist
- Keiji Morokuma (諸熊 奎治; 1934–2017), Japanese theoretical chemist and chemical engineer
- Keiji Muto (武藤 敬司; born 1962), Japanese professional wrestling executive, actor and retired professional wrestler
- Keiji Nakazawa (中沢 啓治; 1939–2012), Japanese manga artist and writer
- Keiji Nakazawa (中澤 圭二; born 1962), Japanese Sushi master
- Keiji Nishikawa (西川 慶二; 1961–2022), Japanese professional shogi player
- Keiji Nishioka (西岡 京治; 1933–1992), Japanese botanist
- Keiji Nishitani (西谷 啓治; 1900–1990), Japanese philosopher
- Keiji Obiki (大引 啓次; born 1984), Japanese professional baseball shortstop
- Keiji Ogushi (大串 啓二; 1934–2020), Japanese hurdler
- Keiji Ohsawa (大沢 啓二; 1932–2010), Japanese Nippon Professional Baseball outfielder
- Keiji Okuyama (奥山 恵二; born 1968), Japanese sport wrestler
- Keiji Oyama (小山 桂司; born 1980), Japanese former professional baseball catcher
- Keiji Ozaki (尾崎 圭司; born 1980), Japanese former professional kickboxer and taekwondo-in.
- Keiji Sada (佐田 啓二; 1926–1964), Japanese cinema actor
- Keiji Sakoda (1972–2021), Japanese American professional wrestler
- Keiji Shibazaki (柴崎 恵次; 1894–1943), Japanese Rear Admiral
- Keiji Shigetomi (重富 計二; born 1979), Japanese football manager
- Keiji Shirahata (白幡 圭史; born 1973), Japanese speed skater
- Keiji Suzuki (鈴木 桂治; born 1980), Japanese judoka and sports scientist
- Keiji Suzuki (鈴木 敬司; 1897–1967), Japanese army intelligence officer
- Keiji Tachikawa (立川 敬二; born 1939), Japanese businessman
- Keiji Takachi (髙地 系治; born 1980), Japanese football player
- Keiji Takahashi (高橋 奎二; born 1997), Japanese baseball player
- Keiji Takayama (高山 圭司; born 1969), Japanese professional wrestler, manager and booker
- Keiji Takei (武井 敬司; born 1980), Japanese former international rugby union player
- Keiji Tamada (玉田 圭司; born 1980), Japanese former professional footballer
- Keiji Tanaka (田中 刑事; born 1994), Japanese retired figure skater
- Keiji Uematsu (植松 奎二; born 1947), Japanese sculptor and contemporary artist
- Keiji Uezono (上園 啓史; born 1984), Japanese former professional baseball pitcher
- Keiji Watanabe (渡邊 圭二; born 1985), Japanese former football player
- Keiji Yamada (山田 啓二; born 1954), Japanese politician
- Keiji Yamagishi (山岸 継司), Japanese video game music composer
- Keiji Yamaguchi (山口 圭司; born 1974), Japanese former professional boxer
- Keiji Yoshimura (吉村 圭司; born 1979), Japanese former football player

== Fictional characters with the name ==
- Keiji Akaashi (赤葦 京治), a character from Haikyu!! with the position of setter from Fukurodani Academy
- Keiji Shibusawa, a character from Yakuza 0
- Keiji Shinogi, a character from the video game Your Turn to Die -Death Game by Majority-
- Keiji Takase (also known as Sasori), a character from Deceive Inc.

== See also ==
- Keiji (manga), a fictionalized account of Maeda Keiji
- Fugo Keiji (富豪刑事), detective mystery drama
