= Fernand Raynaud =

French comedian and actor (1926–1973)

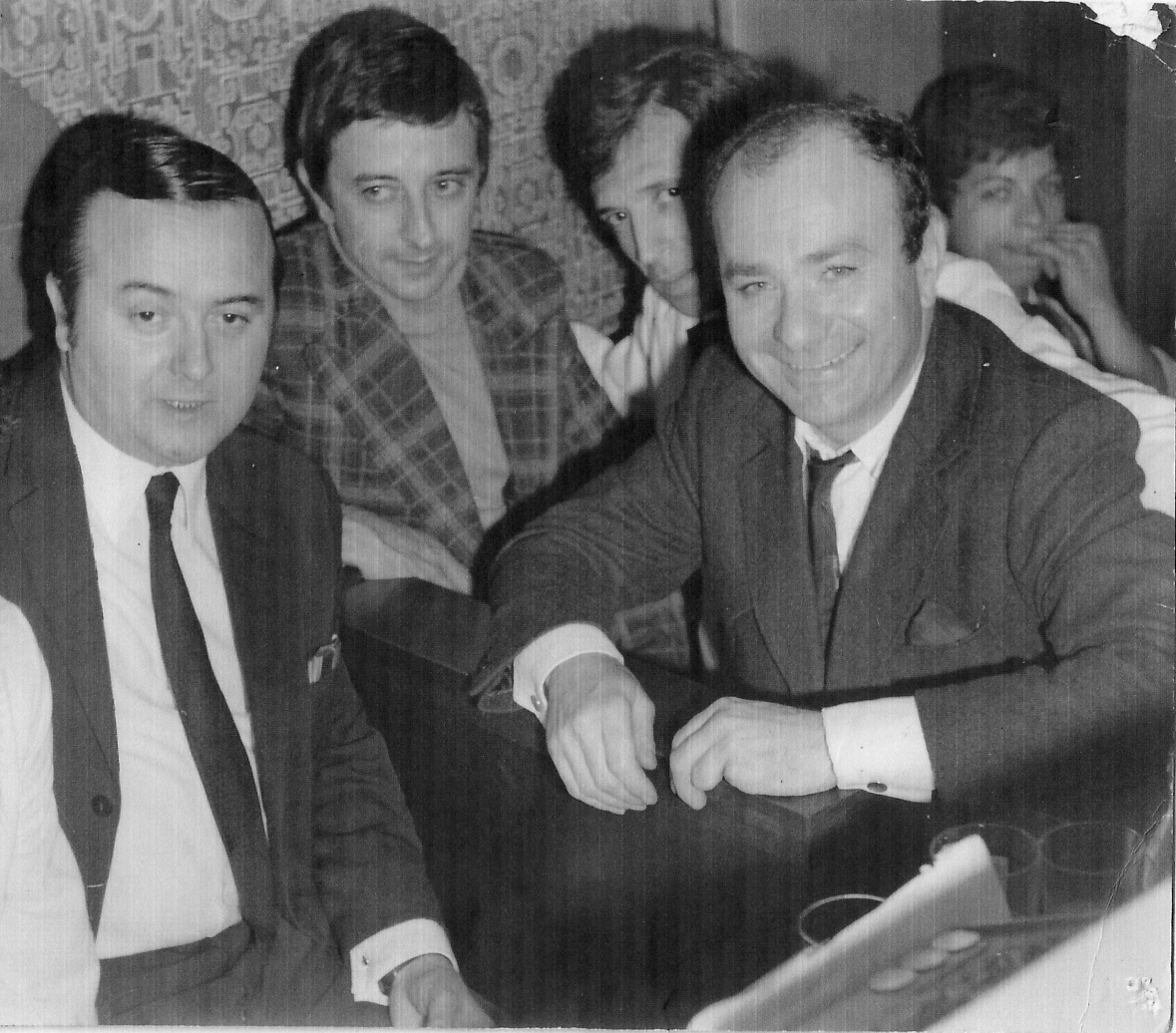
Fernand Raynaud (on the right), 1969

André Gustave Fernand Raynaud, best known as Fernand Raynaud (May 19, 1926 – September 28, 1973), was a French stand-up comic star, an actor and a singer.

== Biography ==
Fernand Raynaud was one of the most renowned standup comedians among French comic actors of the 1950s and 1960s. He began his career playing and singing in cabarets and music halls, then he gained popularity through performances broadcast on television. He's renowned for playing typical, average Frenchmen characters, especially the silly ones, making funny faces and using mime and slapstick humour. In 1973, Raynaud was killed in a car crash in Le Cheix, near Riom, France.

== Sketch comedy ==
- Allô Tonton, pourquoi tu tousses ?
- Aux deux folles
- Avec deux croissants...
- J'm'amuse
- C'est étudié pour
- Heureux !
- J'ai souffert dans ma jeunesse
- La 2 CV de ma sœur
- La bougie
- La chatte à ma sœur
- Le douanier
- La pipe à pépé
- La prévention routière
- La tasse de lait
- Le 22 à Asnières
- Le bègue
- Le bluff
- Le fromage de Hollande
- Le défilé militaire
- Le match de boxe
- Le paysan (Ç'a eut payé, Crésus)
- Le peintre et son modèle
- Le plombier
- Le réfrigérateur
- Le tailleur
- Le timbre à 0.25 F
- Les œufs cassés
- L'inspecteur des platanes
- Ma sœur s'est mariée
- Moi, mon truc c'est le vélo
- Ne me parle pas de Grenoble
- Restons Français
- Un certain temps
- Un mariage en grandes pompes
- Vive le camping
- Vlan, passe-moi l'éponge
- Zanzi Bar

== Filmography ==
=== Cinema ===
- 1955: La Bande à papa, directed by Guy Lefranc: Fernand Jérôme
- 1955: 33 tours et puis s'en vont, directed by Henri Champetier
- 1956: Fernand Cow-boy, directed by Guy Lefranc: Fernand Mignot
- 1956: La vie est belle, directed by Roger Pierre and Jean-Marc Thibault
- 1957: C'est arrivé à 36 chandelles, directed by Henri Diamant-Berger and Fernand Rivers
- 1957: Fernand clochard, directed by Pierre Chevalier: Fernand
- 1958: Happy Arenas, directed by Maurice de Canonge: Fernand Cyprien de Chalamond
- 1958: Le Sicilien, directed by Pierre Chevalier: Fernand
- 1959: Houla-houla, directed by Robert Darène: Fernand Martin
- 1959: Minute papillon, directed by Jean Lefèvre: Oscar
- 1959: La Marraine de Charley, directed by Pierre Chevalier: Charley Rivoire/Gabrielle de la Motte
- 1960: Le Mouton, directed by Pierre Chevalier: Fernand Castel
- 1961: Auguste directed by Pierre Chevalier: Auguste Roussel
- 1962: It's Not My Business, directed by Jean Boyer: Fernand Raynaud/Gaspard
- 1962: Nous irons à Deauville, directed by Francis Rigaud
- 1968: Salut Berthe!, directed by Guy Lefranc: Adrien Chautard
- 1969: The Auvergnat and the Bus, directed by Guy Lefranc: Julien Brulebois

=== Television ===
- 1961: La Belle Américaine, directed by Robert Dhéry
- 1967: Auguste, play directed by Raymond Castans, TV broadcasting.

== Theatre ==
- 1958: Auguste, play directed by Raymond Castans, production by Jean Wall, Théâtre des Nouveautés
- 1962: Le Bourgeois gentilhomme by Molière, production by Jean-Pierre Darras, Théâtre Hébertot

== Songs ==
Fernand Raynaud sang the following songs, most of them written by Raymond Mamoudy and played by Marcel Rossi (piano player):

- Et v'lan passe moi l'éponge
- Avec l'ami bidasse
- Lena
- Telle qu'elle est
