= List of Ops (B) staff =

Deception planning department

Ops (B) was a deception planning department within the Supreme Headquarters Allied Expeditionary Force (SHAEF) during the Second World War. Established in the United Kingdom in April 1943, the section was in charge of operational deception planning for the Western Front. Their major contribution was to Operations Cockade and Bodyguard, the latter being the cover plan for their Allied invasion of Normandy in 1944.

Originally under Colonel J. V. B. Jervis-Read, the department suffered from a lack of authority and resources. In December 1943, Jervis-Read was replaced by Colonel Noel Wild, a member of the middle eastern 'A' Force deception department, and expanded dramatically. Wild split the department into Operations and Intelligence sections. Lieutenant colonel Roger Fleetwood-Hesketh retained charge of the latter, and Wild placed Jervis-Read in command of the former. Fleetwood-Hesketh immediately expanded his staff, bringing in his brother, an MI5 liaison officer and a secretary. The operations section was not expanded until May, with three American officers and Major S. B. D. (Sam) Hood (another 'A' Force alumnus) joining the department.

In July 1944, Wild won a power struggle over who was in charge of deception planning in France; consequently Ops (B) had a much more involved role. He sent Jervis-Read to France at the head of a "Forward" section, accompanied by the American officers Lieutenant Colonel Frederic W. Barnes and Major Alfred (Al) J. F. Moody. By the end of October 1944, all of the American members of the department had returned home, leaving an entirely British staff.

== John Jervis-Read ==
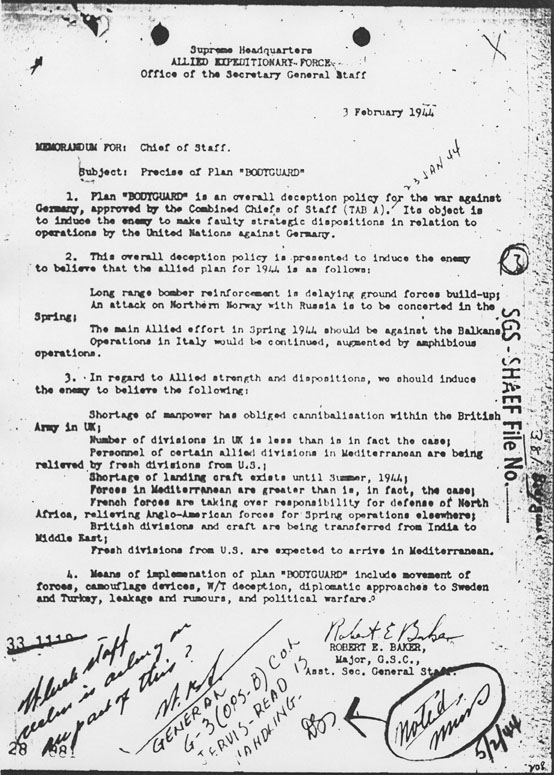
An Operation Bodyguard memo with notes from Colonel Jervis-Read

Brigadier John Vaughan Bruce Jervis-Read OBE was the original head of Ops (B). He had joined the Royal Engineers from university as a second lieutenant in 1933. By March 1942, when he was appointed head of the deception section, he held the rank of colonel. His main task was the planning of Operation Cockade. It was not a success, in part due to the complexity of the operation, but also because of the limited resources at his disposal. Lieutenant General Frederick E. Morgan, at that time the most senior officer at SHAEF, the Supreme Commander having yet to be appointed, viewed Colonel Dudley Clarke's A Force as a "private army" which he would not have duplicated under his command.

In December 1943 Jervis-Read was replaced by Colonel Noel Wild, who reorganised Ops (B). Jervis-Read was made head of the Operations section as his deputy. Following the Allied invasion of France, he became Deputy Assistant Chief of Staff at SHAEF. In 1945 he was appointed an Officer of the Order of the British Empire (OBE), the citation recognised his work with Ops (B) and in France. He retired from the army in 1963, having attained the rank of brigadier.

== Noel Wild ==
Colonel Noel Wild was Dudley Clarke's deputy in Cairo from April 1942. Toward the end of 1943, when Ops (B) was scheduled for expansion to assist with Bodyguard, a deception cover plan for the D-Day landings, Clarke secretly suggested Wild as the department's head. In December of that year Wild was sent to London, he believed on leave, where he was assessed for suitability and then appointed to the role.

Under Wild, Ops (B) was expanded and divided into two sections – Operations and Intelligence. It received greater power, including control of the information flowing to double agents. Wild used this to help with planning for Operation Fortitude, the major segment of the Bodyguard plan. This situation did not last long; another 'A' Force alumnus, Lieutenant Colonel David Strangeways, was brought over to head up R Force, the operational deception unit of the 21st Army Group. Strangeways and Wild clashed on a personal and professional level. Eventually, Strangeways rewrote large portions of the Fortitude South plan, and pushed Ops (B) into a more supporting role.

In July 1944, Wild wrestled control of operational deception planning from Strangeways and others, and sent a portion of the department (Jervis-Read plus the American officers Barnes and Moody) to France as the Forward section. He remained in the UK with the rest of the staff as the 'Read' section.

== Roger Fleetwood-Hesketh ==
Lieutenant Colonel Roger Fleetwood Hesketh TD, DL, OBE, was the son of Major Charles Hesketh Fleetwood-Hesketh. Like his father, he was educated at Eton and Oxford before becoming a barrister, and later a soldier. Hesketh, then a major, joined Ops (B) alongside Jervis-Read as the department's only intelligence officer. Colonel John Bevan, in setting up the unit, felt that it would only require operational capabilities, and that intelligence would remain with his own London Controlling Section; but with the arrival of Wild, Hesketh was handed control of an expanded intelligence section, which included his brother, Cuthbert, a civilian secretary and an MI5 liaison officer.

Following the end of the war, Hesketh was sent to Germany, alongside his brother, to search through the files of German intelligence, and question officers. He was then asked to write a history of deception in Western Europe, including the work up to and including Operation Fortitude.

== Other members ==
Prior to Wild's arrival, Ops (B) had a very small staff – consisting of Jervis-Read, Hesketh and two American officers. From January 1944, Wild expanded the staff to include liaisons with MI5, additional American officers and experienced deception staff from 'A' Force in Cairo.

=== Operations ===
Name	Country	Joined	Left	Notes
Lieutenant Colonel Percy Lash	US	April 1943	January 1944	US Army planner, temporarily assigned to the department under Jervis-Read. Both returned to Ops (A) (the traditional planning department of SHAEF) following Wild's arrival.
Major Melvin Brown	US	April 1943	January 1944	US Army planner, temporarily assigned to the department under Jervis-Read. Both returned to Ops (A) (the traditional planning department of SHAEF) following Wild's arrival.
Lieutenant Colonel Frederic W. Barnes	US	May 1944	September 1944	Joined the operations section in May. When Wild sent Jervis-Read to France in July, Barnes along with Moody went with him. Barnes returned to the US in September before being posted to the Pacific where he took part in further deception work.
Major Alfred (Al) J. Moody	US	May 1944	September 1944	West Point educated, (he graduated top of his class in 1941), Moody joined along with the other American officers in May 1944, and went to France with Jervis-Read in July. He returned to the US in September 1944, before being posted to the Pacific.
Captain John ("Jack") B. Corbett	US	May 1944	October 1944	The third American officer to join the Department in May 1944. He left in October, and was also posted to the Pacific theatre (although much later than Moody and Barnes). In February 1945, he joined D Division where he remained for the rest of the war. In 1947, still in the Army, he visited London on a fact-finding mission to review British deception efforts since the war.
Major S. B. D. "Sam" Hood	UK	May 1944		Hood was a former 'A' Force member, having joined in May 1943 to help co-ordinate radio deception. In December he replaced David Strangeways as the head of 'A' Force Tac HQ (West) in Italy when the latter was posted to the UK. He joined Ops (B) at the end of May 1944, remaining in the UK with Wild during the July reshuffle.

=== Intelligence ===
Name	Country	Joined	Left	Notes
Major Christopher Harmer	UK	January 1944	March 1944	MI5 liaison; a former officer for the agency and case officer for the double agent "Brutus". Suggested the selection of Lieutenant General George S. Patton as commander of the notional First United States Army Group, a part of the Operation Fortitude deception. He left on 7 April to command 104 SCI Unit, a detachment established to handle new double agents on the continent. In this role he had dealings with Ops (B), although Wild refused to use such agents in deception activities. After the war Harmer returned to practice as a solicitor.
Phyllis White	UK	January 1944		Civilian secretary, drafted from MI5.
Captain Cuthbert Fleetwood-Hesketh	UK	January 1944		Roger Fleetwood Hesketh's brother, a taciturn individual brought in from the War Office because he spoke German. He subsequently acted as the department's main courier between the various deception planning agencies (and 21st Army HQ). Following the end of the War in Europe, he helped debrief German intelligence officers to evaluate how well deception had worked.
