= I Was Monty's Double (film) =

1958 British film by John Guillermin

- Theatrical release poster
- Directed by: John Guillermin
- Screenplay by: Bryan Forbes
- Based on: I Was Monty's Double by M. E. Clifton James
- Produced by: Maxwell Setton
- Starring: M. E. Clifton James; John Mills; Cecil Parker
- Cinematography: Basil Emmott
- Edited by: Max Benedict
- Music by: John Addison
- Production company: Walton Studios
- Distributed by: Associated British-Pathé Limited
- Release date: 21 September 1958
- Running time: 99 min.
- Country: United Kingdom
- Language: English

I Was Monty's Double (U.S. title: Hell, Heaven or Hoboken) is a 1958 British film directed by John Guillermin and starring M. E. Clifton James, John Mills and Cecil Parker. The screenplay was by Bryan Forbes adapted from the autobiography of Clifton James, an actor who pretended to be General Bernard Montgomery as a decoy during World War II. It was produced by the Associated British Picture Corporation.

== Plot ==
A few months before the D-Day landings during World War II, the British government launches a misinformation campaign, spreading a rumour that the landings might occur at a location other than Normandy. The details of the operation are handed to two intelligence officers, Colonel E.F. Logan and Major Harvey. They are initially unable to devise such a plan, but one night, Harvey sees an actor at a London theatre performing a convincing impression of General Bernard Montgomery.

The actor is M. E. Clifton James, a lieutenant stationed in Leicester with the Royal Army Pay Corps and a professional actor during peacetime. He is summoned to London purportedly to test for an army film, and a plan is devised by which he will tour North Africa impersonating Montgomery.

James doubts that he can successfully impersonate Montgomery, but he agrees to try. Disguised as a corporal, he spends time at Montgomery's headquarters and learns to copy the general's mannerisms and style. After an interview with the general, James is dispatched to tour North Africa.

Accompanied by Harvey, who is playing the role of a brigadier and Montgomery's aide-de-camp, James arrives at Gibraltar, where the governor, who has known Montgomery for years, is astounded by the likeness. To further the deception, local businessman and known German agent Karl Nielson is invited to dinner so that he will learn of and spread the information.

James and Harvey tour North Africa and visit the troops. With only a few days remaining before the landings, it is learned that the Germans have indeed been fooled and have kept many troops in the south, away from Normandy. His job completed, James hides at a heavily guarded villa on the coast.

The Germans have been deceived further than Harvey realises. A team of German commandos are transported by submarine to kidnap Montgomery. They kill his guards and are ready to embark with James, but Harvey learns of the kidnapping and foils it at the last moment. They return quietly to London.

== Cast ==
- M. E. Clifton James as Himself/General Bernard Montgomery
- John Mills as Major Harvey
- Cecil Parker as Colonel E. F. Logan
- Patrick Allen as Colonel Mathers
- Patrick Holt as Colonel Dawson
- Leslie Phillips as Major Tennant
- Michael Hordern as Governor of Gibraltar
- Marius Goring as Karl Nielson
- Barbara Hicks as Hester Baring
- Duncan Lamont as Wing Commander Bates
- Anthony Sagar as Guard Sergeant
- John Gale as Flight Lieutenant Osborne
- Kenneth J. Warren as Flying Officer Davies
- James Hayter as Sergeant Adams
- Sid James as Desk Clerk Y.M.C.A.
- MacDonald Parke as American General
- John Le Mesurier as R.A.P.C. adjutant
- Vera Day as Angela
- George Eugeniou as Garcia
- Patrick Connor as Soldier in Tent (uncredited)
- Sam Kydd as Soldier in Cinema
- Alfie Bass as man on train
- Allan Cuthbertson as Guards Officer
- Harry Fowler as Civilian (end scene)

== Comparison with book ==
The film broadly follows the account by M.E. Clifton James in his book of the same name, but according to James, there was no attempt to kidnap him. The German high command did plan to have him killed, but Adolf Hitler vetoed the plan until he could be sure where the landings would actually take place.

Gibraltar was in reality a hotbed of German agents, and James/Bernard Montgomery was watched by several operatives who were smuggled into Gibraltar specifically for that purpose. James/Montgomery deliberately talked about nonexistent operations and plans in the hope that the spies would overhear and take his misinformation seriously.

The intelligence officer who initially recruited James was David Niven, who was serving as a lieutenant colonel at the war office.

== Production ==
When James agreed to impersonate Montgomery, he was barred from mentioning it under army regulations. However, after Operation Copperhead was mentioned in the book My Three Years with Eisenhower, James asked for and received permission to write a book, which was published in 1954.

In June 1956, it was announced that the film rights had been purchased by Todon Productions, the company owned by Tony Owen and Donna Reed. Todon wanted Laurence Olivier to play Montgomery and Stephen Watts was assigned to write the treatment. Fredric March was named as another possibility for the lead. In mid-June, it was announced that Clifton James would play himself and Montgomery, with Olivier the leading choice for the other main role Major Harvey. Permission from Montgomery and the war office was conditional upon script approval. A deal was signed with Columbia to distribute. In August 1956, the film was listed on Todon's slate, which also included Town on Trial, another film directed by John Guillermin and starring John Mills. In September, Michael Rennie was mentioned as a lead. In July 1957, it was announced that Ken Hughes would direct.

Producer Maxwell Setton took the film for Rank, which agreed to finance, but Rank head John Davis wanted Bryan Forbes' script vetted by head of production Earl St. John. Setton then took the project to Robert Clark at the Associated British Picture Corporation (ABPC), and Clark agreed to finance the film. Setton changed the nationality of Marius Goring's spy character Karl Nielson from Spanish to Swedish to enable the unit to film in Gibraltar.

Forbes wrote in his memoir Notes for a Life that the last act where James was kidnapped was totally fictitious and put in at the insistence of John Guillermin. Forbes wanted to tell a more accurate version of the story, of "an unknown actor who, by sheer chance, was plucked from obscurity and given a few days of total power" then afterwards "was more or less brushed aside.... It was a brilliantly conceived idea, brilliantly executed, and Clifton James, who was a gentle and kindly man, deserved a better fate. To me this was the real story to tell on the screen, something with a beginning, a middle and an end. The glossy, predictable fiction that Guillerman so willingly embraced reduced the film to just another Boy’s Own Paper adventure."

Newsreel footage shows the real Bernard Montgomery in many scenes, but "for a few key moments, James stands in for the real Monty." (Note: On some US prints, the title is Hell, Heaven or Hoboken, taken from an address made by the title character to US officers.) In January 1959, ABPC signed a deal with National Telefilm Associates for American distribution of I Was Monty's Double and Ice Cold in Alex in the U.S.

== Reception ==
I Was Monty's Double was a success at the British box office. James embarked on a tour to promote the film.

Variety described the film as "excellently acted and directed....the film has several moments of real tension. Even with a somewhat fictionalized ending, there is a documentary flavor about it which is absorbing. Plenty of news footage has been woven into the pic and it has been done with commendable ingenuity. Bryan Forbes' taut screenplay is liberally spiced with humor...James shows himself to be a resourceful actor in his own right... An extraordinary story told convincingly and compellingly."

Film reviewer Stephen Vagg has written that the film is "... splendidly entertaining. The script was written by thespian-turned-scribe Bryan Forbes, and there’s some lovely "actor" character stuff in the film, e.g. James thinking he's being hired for a film role and bringing along a scrapbook of his reviews, James having last-minute nerves, James getting up on stage and worrying about blowing it."

Stephen Watts, who was involved in the real military operation, felt that James "played himself with great skill and distinction." When Montgomery viewed the film at a London cinema, audiences outside reportedly assumed that he was Clifton James.

== In popular culture ==
I Was Monty's Double inspired a Goon Show episode entitled "I Was Monty's Treble", referring to at least three doppelgängers.

It also inspired the film The Night We Dropped a Clanger.

== See also ==
- Operation Copperhead
