= Underworld Beauty =

- Directed by: Seijun Suzuki
- Written by: Susumu Saji
- Starring: Michitaro Mizushima; Mari Shiraki; Hideaki Nitani; Shinsuke Ashida; Kiroshi Kondo; Kaku Takashina; Toru Abe
- Cinematography: Wataro Nakao
- Music by: Naozumi Yamamoto
- Distributed by: Nikkatsu
- Release date: March 25, 1958
- Running time: 87 minutes
- Country: Japan
- Language: Japanese

Underworld Beauty (暗黒街の美女, Ankokugai no bijo) is a 1958 Japanese crime film directed by Seijun Suzuki. It marked Suzuki's first CinemaScope film and was also the first to be credited to his assumed name Seijun Suzuki.
