= In Case of Adversity =

1958 film by Claude Autant-Lara

- Theatrical release poster
- French: En cas de malheur
- Directed by: Claude Autant-Lara
- Screenplay by: Jean Aurenche; Pierre Bost
- Based on: In Case of Emergency by Georges Simenon
- Produced by: Raoul Lévy; Ray Ventura
- Starring: Jean Gabin; Brigitte Bardot; Edwige Feuillère; Nicole Berger; Franco Interlenghi
- Cinematography: Jacques Natteau
- Edited by: Madeleine Gug
- Music by: René Cloërec
- Production companies: Union Cinématographique Lyonnaise; Iéna Productions; CEI Incom
- Distributed by: Cinédis
- Release dates: 2 September 1958 (Venice); 17 September 1958 (France); 30 October 1958 (Italy)
- Running time: 122 minutes
- Countries: France; Italy
- Language: French
- Budget: $900,000
- Box office: 3,152,082 admissions (France)

In Case of Adversity (French: En cas de malheur), released as Love Is My Profession in the United States, is a 1958 crime drama film directed by Claude Autant-Lara and starring Jean Gabin, Brigitte Bardot, Edwige Feuillère, Nicole Berger and Franco Interlenghi. The screenplay by Jean Aurenche and Pierre Bost is based on the 1956 novel In Case of Emergency by Georges Simenon. It was the second Simenon-based film Gabin starred in that year, after Maigret Sets a Trap.

The plot follows a married lawyer who rigs a trial to acquit a young female criminal he has become obsessed with, even to the point of imagining they might have a life together and start a family. The film was released in France on 17 September 1958.

== Plot ==
A petty criminal aged 22, the attractive Yvette is caught after robbing a watchmaker's shop with a toy pistol and felling his old wife. To defend her, she asks for André Gobillot, a leading member of the Paris bar. Telling him she has no money to pay him, she lifts her skirt to show him her goods. Accepting the deal, he arranges a false witness and after getting her acquitted instals her in a small hotel.

His wife Viviane realises what is happening but hopes the improbable affair will not last. Knowing nothing about the girl, Gobillot has first to wean her off drink and drugs. He also doesn't know that she is still entertaining her current lover, an impoverished medical student called Mazetti. As Gobillot's obsession grows, his wife gets more alarmed and an enquiry is opened into his bribing the witness who lied.

When Yvette tells him she is pregnant, he is overjoyed and books a holiday for the two of them. Before they leave, Yvette cannot resist one last visit to Mazetti's sordid room where, enraged with jealousy, he cuts her throat. It is not stated whether Gobillot's wife will take him back or if he will still be able to practise law.

== Cast ==
- Jean Gabin as Maître André Gobillot
- Brigitte Bardot as Yvette Maudet
- Edwige Feuillère as Viviane Gobillot
- Nicole Berger as Janine, Yvette's maid
- Madeleine Barbulée as Bordenave
- Gabrielle Fontan as Mme Langlois
- Jacques Clancy as Duret, Gobillot's assistant
- Annick Allières as Noémie, Yvette's friend
- Suzanne Grey as the florist
- Edith Cérou as himself (as Edith Cerou)
- Hubert de Lapparent as the jeweler's lawyer
- Georges Seey as the jeweler (as Georges Scey)
- Julien Bertheau as the inspector
- Jacques Marin as the receptionist at the Trianon Hotel
- Claude Magnier as Gaston
- Claire Nobis as himself
- Franco Interlenghi as Mazetti

== Production ==
Bardot was reportedly paid $85,000.

== Reception ==
=== Box office ===
In Case of Adversity was 13th most popular film of 1958 in France, recording admissions of 3,152,082.

The film further cemented Bardot's global success, the overseas market generated a profit of $2,500,000 for producer Raoul Lévy.

=== Critical response ===
Variety said the film "runs too long".

Bosley Crowther of The New York Times wrote, "Something is obviously missing in the French film that has been made from Georges Simenon's weirdly off-beat novel." He continued: "There are elements for shattering drama here. Yet, strangely, it doesn't develop. It all moves along in the groove of conventional nonconformance with the obvious social rules." Crowther called Autant-Lara "one of the best directors in France", but wrote that Bardot's performance "falls far short" and that "Jean Gabin misses, too".

François Truffaut called it one of Autant-Lara's best films and compared it to the plays of Jean Anouilh, noting:

We come out of it with a mixture of disgust and admiration, a sense of satisfaction that is real enough but incomplete. It is 100 percent French, with all the virtues and vices that implies: an analysis that is at once subtle and narrow, a skill that is mixed with spitefulness, a spirit of unflinching observation directed at the sordid, and talented sleight-of hand that delivers a liberal message in the end.

He described how the film contrasts the scene where Bardot's character robs a backstreet watchmender's shop with the ceremonial on the same day of Queen Elizabeth II's state visit to Paris:

It's the girl who interests us and preoccupies us, not an anachronistic queen. It is precisely because Bardot is a girl who represents her time absolutely faithfully that she is more famous than any queen or princess ... And it's why En Cas des Malheur is her best film since And God Created Woman — an anti-Sabrina, anti-Roman Holiday, anti-Anastasia movie that is truly republican.

FilmInk wrote the film "is famous for a scene where Bardot seduces Gabin by lying against a desk, hiking up her skirt to him... showing the audience her backside and Gabin what was on the other side."

== See also ==
- List of French films of 1958
