= M. E. Clifton James =

Australian-English actor and soldier (1898–1963)

Meyrick Edward Clifton James
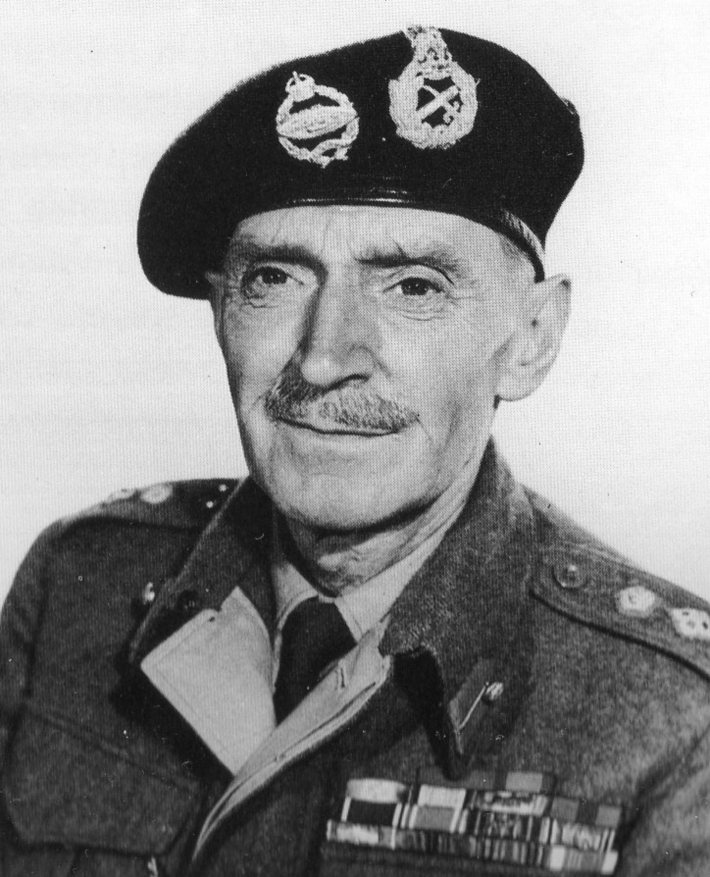
- Clifton James posing as General Montgomery
- Born: 30 March 1898; Perth, Australia
- Died: 5 May 1963 (aged 65); Worthing, England
- Military career
- Allegiance: United Kingdom
- Branch: British Army
- Service years: 1914–1918; 1940–1946
- Rank: Lieutenant (WWII)
- Service number: 141055 (WWII)
- Units: Royal Fusiliers (WWI); Royal Army Pay Corps (WWII)
- Conflicts: First World War • Battle of the Somme; Second World War • Operation Copperhead
- Other work: Actor

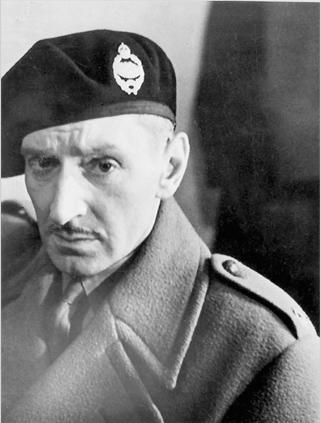
Lt. Clifton James

Meyrick Edward Clifton James (30 March 1898 – 5 May 1963) was an actor and soldier, most famous for his physical resemblance to Field Marshal Bernard Montgomery – an attribute that was used by British intelligence, as part of a military deception operation, during the Second World War.

== Early life ==
Clifton James was born in Perth, Western Australia. While he left for England with his parents at two years of age, James was descended from early settlers of Western Australia (WA) of some interest to historians. His mother, Rebecca Catherine James, née Clifton, was a granddaughter of Marshall Waller Clifton (1787–1861), a civil servant, magistrate and fellow of the Royal Society. James's father, John Charles Horsey James (1841–1899) was WA's first Commissioner of Titles, a (nominated) member of the Western Australian Legislative Council (1887–1888), Judge of the Supreme Court, and president of the Western Australian Cricket Association.

== Career ==
After serving in the Royal Fusiliers during the First World War, and seeing action at the Battle of the Somme, James took up acting, "starting at 15 shillings weekly with Fred Karno, who put Chaplin on the road to fame".

At the outbreak of the Second World War, he volunteered his services to the British Army as an entertainer. Instead of being assigned to ENSA, as he had hoped, James was commissioned as a second lieutenant in the Royal Army Pay Corps on 11 July 1940, and eventually posted to Leicester. There, his acting seemed to be limited to his membership of the Pay Corps Drama and Variety Group. He was promoted to lieutenant on 11 January 1942.

In 1944, his resemblance to Montgomery was spotted, and he was employed to pretend to be the general as part of a campaign designed to deceive the Germans in the lead-up to D-Day.

== Operation Copperhead ==
In 1944, about seven weeks before D-Day, Lieutenant-Colonel J. V. B. Jervis-Reid noticed James' resemblance to Montgomery while he was reviewing photographs in a newspaper. James, it seemed, had "rescued" a failing patriotic show by appearing in it, quite briefly, as "Monty". MI5 decided to exploit that resemblance to confuse German intelligence. James was contacted by Lieutenant-Colonel David Niven, who worked for the Army's film unit, and was asked to go to London on the pretext of making a film.

When Niven explained that it was about something different, James supposedly burst into tears because he thought he had been exposed as a bigamist who was receiving a double marriage allowance. Like many of Niven's anecdotes, this one is viewed with scepticism.

The planned ruse was part of a wider deception which aimed to divert German troops from Northern France, by convincing the Nazis that an Allied invasion of Southern France (Operation Dragoon) would precede a northern invasion.

The plan was code-named Operation Copperhead, and James was assigned to Montgomery's staff to learn his speech and mannerisms. Despite the problems that he had with alcohol (Montgomery was teetotal), and the differences in personality, the project continued. James also had to give up smoking. James had lost his right-hand middle finger in the First World War and so a prosthetic finger was made.

On 25 May 1944, James flew from RAF Northolt to Gibraltar on-board Churchill's private aircraft. During a reception at the Governor-General's house, hints were made about "Plan 303", a plan to invade southern France. German intelligence picked that up and ordered agents to find out what they could about "Plan 303". James then flew to Algiers where, over the next few days, he made a round of public appearances with General Maitland Wilson, the Allied commander in the Mediterranean theatre. James was then secretly flown to Cairo, where he stayed until the invasion in Normandy was well under way. He then returned to his previous job after an absence of five weeks.

Various reasons were put forward for the speedy conclusion of the operation, including the suggestion that James was seen in Gibraltar smoking and drunk (the real Montgomery was a non-smoking teetotaler), though the most likely explanation is the one put forward by Dennis Wheatley, who was part of the British deception efforts during the war. In The Deception Planners published in the 1980s, he stated that the operation was wound up successfully, its purpose having been accomplished. The effectiveness of the deception is hard to assess. According to captured enemy generals, German intelligence believed that it was Montgomery, though they still guessed that it was a feint.

== Post-war life ==
After being demobilised in June 1946, James was unable to find theatrical employment, and was obliged to apply for unemployment benefits to support his wife and two children in London.

== I Was Monty's Double ==
In 1947, James had made a brief (non-speaking and uncredited) appearance as an extra in the film Holiday Camp, playing a holidaymaker in a dance floor scene, along with Jack Warner and Kathleen Harrison. In 1954, James published a book about his exploits, entitled I Was Monty's Double (released in the US as The Counterfeit General Montgomery). The book became the basis for the script of the 1958 film starring John Mills and Cecil Parker, with James playing himself and Montgomery. The script was "tweaked" for effect. "Operation Copperhead" became "Operation Hambone", and additional elements of comedy, danger and intrigue were added, including a fictional kidnapping attempt by enemy forces. He also appeared in a short cameo role (again non-speaking and uncredited) as Field Marshal Montgomery (using a mix of original postwar footage of Monty inspecting an RAF passing-out parade and close-up shots of James) in the 1957 film High Flight, starring Ray Milland. He also appeared as himself in The Night We Dropped a Clanger.

On 20 January 1959, James appeared on an episode of the American TV quiz show series To Tell the Truth, where a panel of celebrities had to ascertain which of the three uniformed actors present, all claiming to have been Monty's wartime double, was telling the truth.

== Death ==
James died on 5 May 1963, at his home in Heatherstone Road in Worthing, Sussex, aged 65.

== See also ==
- Political decoy
