= 11th Writers Guild of America Awards =

11th WGA Awards
- Date: 1959
- Organized by: Writers Guild of America, East and the Writers Guild of America, West

The 11th Writers Guild of America Awards honored the best film writers of 1958. Winners were announced in 1959.

== Winners and nominees ==
=== Film ===
Winners are listed first highlighted in boldface.

**Best Written Musical**: **Gigi, Screenplay by Alan Jay Lerner; Based on the novella by Colette**; Damn Yankees, Screenplay by George Abbott; Based on the book by George Abbott and Douglass Wallop; The Girl Most Likely, Screenplay by Devery Freeman; South Pacific, Screenplay by Paul Osborn; Based on "Tales of the South Pacific" by James A. Michener; Tom Thumb, Screenplay by Ladislas Fodor; Based on a story of the Brothers Grimm	**Best Written American Drama**: **The Defiant Ones, Screenplay by Harold Jacob Smith and Nedrick Young**; Cat on a Hot Tin Roof, Screenplay by Richard Brooks and James Poe; Based on the play by Tennessee Williams; I Want to Live!, Screenplay by Nelson Gidding and Don Mankiewicz; The Long, Hot Summer, Screenplay by Irving Ravetch and Harriet Frank Jr.; Based on the novel "The Hamlet" by William Faukner; Separate Tables, Screenplay by Terence Rattigan and John Gay; Based on the play by Terence Rattigan
**Best Written American Comedy**: **Me and the Colonel, Screenplay by S.N. Behrman and George Froeschel; Based on the play by Franz Werfel**; Houseboat, Screenplay by Melville Shavelson and Jack Rose; Indiscreet, Screenplay by Norman Krasna; Based on the play; The Reluctant Debutante, Screenplay by William Douglas-Home and Julius J. Epstein; Teacher's Pet, Screenplay by Fay Kanin and Michael Kanin	

=== Special awards ===
Laurel Award for Screenwriting Achievement

**Nunnally Johnson**
