= Cat on a Hot Tin Roof (1958 film) =

1958 film by Richard Brooks

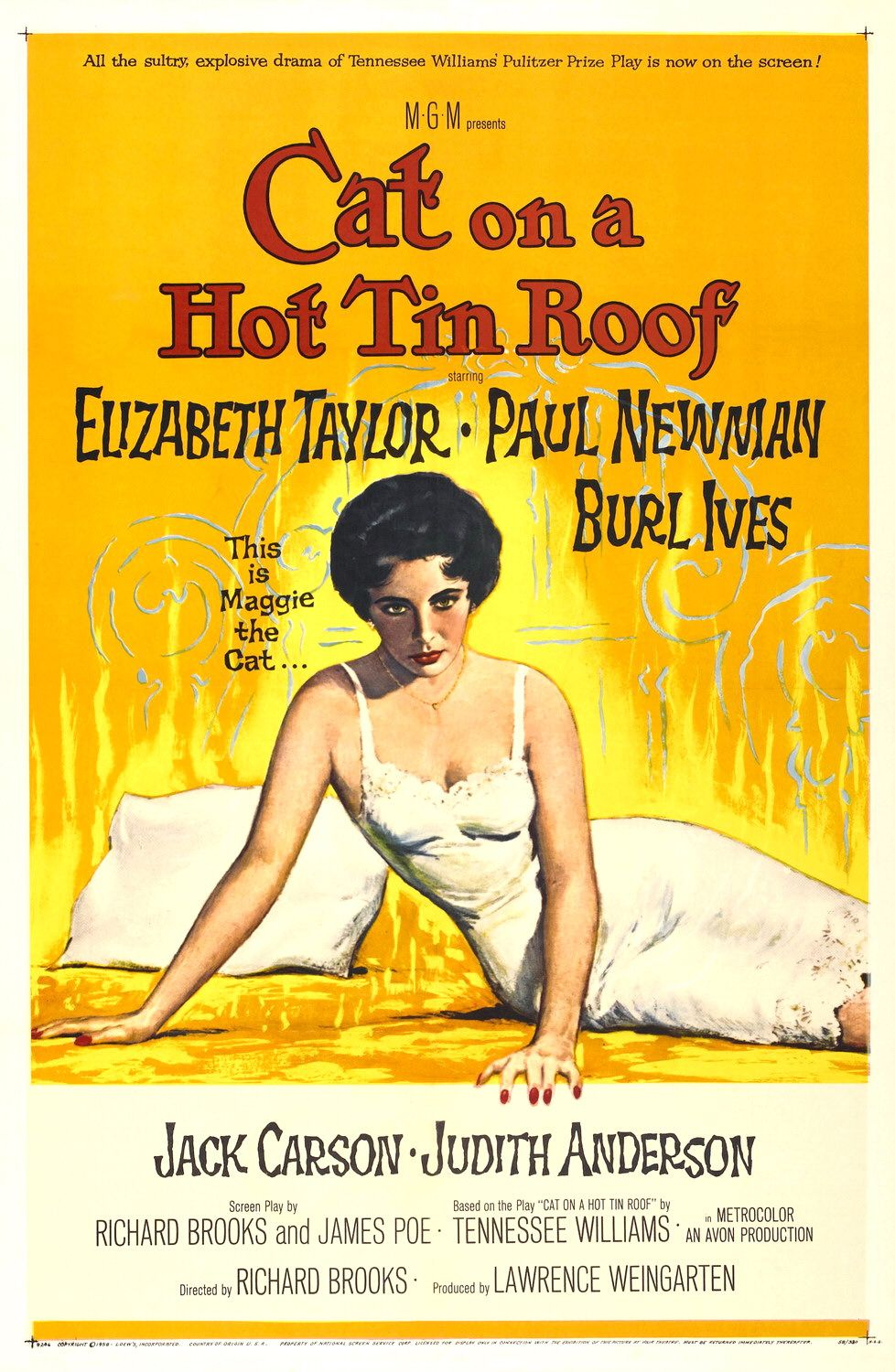
- Theatrical release poster by Reynold Brown
- Directed by: Richard Brooks
- Screenplay by: Richard Brooks; James Poe
- Based on: Cat on a Hot Tin Roof; 1955 play by Tennessee Williams
- Produced by: Lawrence Weingarten
- Starring: Elizabeth Taylor; Paul Newman; Burl Ives; Jack Carson; Judith Anderson
- Cinematography: William Daniels
- Edited by: Ferris Webster
- Music by: Charles Wolcott (uncredited)
- Production company: Avon Productions
- Distributed by: Metro-Goldwyn-Mayer
- Release dates: August 23, 1958 (Boston); August 27, 1958 (United States)
- Running time: 108 minutes
- Country: United States
- Language: English
- Budget: $2.3 million
- Box office: $11.2 million

Cat on a Hot Tin Roof is a 1958 American Southern Gothic drama film directed by Richard Brooks (who co-wrote the screenplay with James Poe) based on the 1955 Pulitzer Prize-winning play of the same name by Tennessee Williams. The film stars Elizabeth Taylor, Paul Newman, Burl Ives, Jack Carson and Judith Anderson.

Well-received by both critics and audiences, Cat on a Hot Tin Roof was MGM's most successful release of 1958, and became the third highest-grossing film of that year.

== Plot ==
Paul Newman (Brick) and Elizabeth Taylor (Maggie) in an early scene from the film

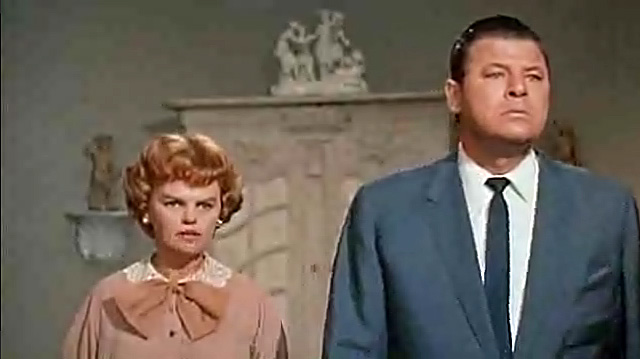
Madeleine Sherwood and Jack Carson

Late one night on a track field, a drunken Brick Pollitt tries to recapture his high school athletic glory days by leaping hurdles. He breaks his ankle, leaving him dependent on a crutch. The next day, Brick and his wife Maggie ("the Cat") visit his family's plantation in the Mississippi Delta to celebrate the 65th birthday of Brick's father, Big Daddy.

Depressed, Brick has spent the last few years drinking while resisting the affections of his wife, who shares with him her worries about the inheritance of Big Daddy's wealth. The family speculates about why Maggie is childless, while Brick's brother, Gooper, and his wife, Mae, have five children and a sixth on the way.

Big Daddy and Big Mama arrive home from the hospital by private airplane and are greeted by Gooper, Mae, and their children, along with Maggie. Annoyed by the rehearsed display that his grandchildren give him, Big Daddy ignores them and drives to the house with Maggie. The news is that Big Daddy is not dying of cancer. However, his doctor meets privately, first with Gooper and then with Brick, to divulge that it is a deception: Big Daddy has inoperable cancer and will likely be dead within a year. The truth is being kept from Big Daddy, as well as from all the women in the family. Brick reveals this to Maggie, who is heartbroken. Maggie wants Brick to take an interest in his father for both unselfish and selfish reasons, but he stubbornly refuses.

Original theatrical trailer

As the party winds down, Big Daddy meets with Brick in his room, saying that he is fed up with Brick's behavior and alcoholism. Maggie joins them; at Brick's insistence, she reveals what happened a few years before, on the night Brick's best friend and football teammate, Skipper, took his life. Maggie was jealous of Skipper, who usurped Brick's attention. Brick's infatuation with Skipper was misguided, as Skipper was far less accomplished on the field and in life than Brick wanted to believe. Skipper was lost without Brick at his side, much more dependent on Brick than Brick was dependent on Skipper. Determined to ruin the Brick-Skipper relationship "by any means necessary", she considered having sex with Skipper, making her husband question Skipper's loyalty. In Skipper's hotel bedroom, however, realizing she could have lost Brick instead, Maggie changed her mind and ran away. That very night, Skipper phoned Brick, falsely claiming to have had sex with Maggie. Since then, Brick blamed Maggie for infidelity, refusing to have sex with her. After Skipper's suicide, Brick had blamed himself for not having answered further phone calls from Skipper, resulting in Brick's self-destructive dependence on alcohol out of guilt over Skipper's death.

After an argument, Brick lets it slip to Big Daddy that he will die of cancer, and this birthday will be his last. Shaken, Big Daddy retreats to the cellar. Meanwhile, Gooper, a lawyer, and his wife, Mae, argue with Big Mama about the family's cotton business and Big Daddy's will. Egged on by the scheming Mae, Gooper argues to cut Brick and Maggie out of the family fortune.

Brick descends into the cellar, a labyrinth of antiques and family possessions, mostly bought by Big Mama during a European tour. Brick and Big Daddy confront each other in front of a large cutout of Brick in his athletic glory days. Big Daddy contrasts his own youthful experience with his hobo father, a veteran of the Spanish-American War, who loved his young son, keeping him with him always, but leaving him nothing but an old worn out suitcase containing his army uniform. Brick points out his legacy was a father's unconditional love, lacking in their own relationship. The pair reaches a reconciliation of sorts.

In Big Daddy’s absence, Big Mama steps up to resist Gooper and Mae. On his return, Maggie gives Big Daddy her birthday present: the announcement of her pregnancy. When Mae calls Maggie a liar, Big Daddy and Brick defend her, although Brick knows that Maggie is not pregnant, and Big Daddy suspects it. In their room, Maggie and Brick reconcile and kiss, with Brick saying that they must make Maggie's lie come true.

== Cast ==
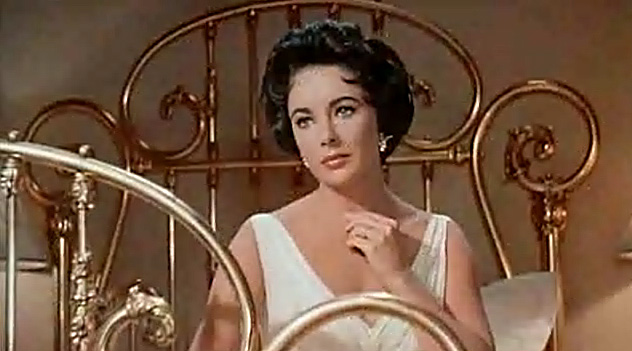
Taylor received her second Oscar nomination for the film

- Elizabeth Taylor as Margaret "Maggie the Cat" Pollitt
- Paul Newman as "Brick" Pollitt
- Burl Ives as Harvey "Big Daddy" Pollitt
- Jack Carson as Cooper "Gooper" Pollitt
- Judith Anderson as Ida "Big Mama" Pollitt
- Madeleine Sherwood as Mae Flynn "Sister Woman" Pollitt
- Larry Gates as Dr. Baugh
- Vaughn Taylor as Deacon Davis

== Production ==
The original stage production of Cat on a Hot Tin Roof opened on Broadway on March 24, 1955, with Burl Ives and Madeleine Sherwood in the roles that they subsequently played in the film.

Dore Schary was head of MGM. He saw the play and authorized the purchase of the film rights, intending for it to star Grace Kelly, be directed by Joshua Logan, and be produced by Sol Siegel. Siegel did not want to produce the film and Kelly retired from acting to marry Rainier III, Prince of Monaco, so Logan lost interest. The job of producing went to Pandro Berman. He formed a company, Avon Productions, with Lawrence Weingarten that made films through MGM. Berman went to make The Reluctant Debutante, so Weingarten was asked to take over production on Cat.

In June 1957, James Poe was working on the screenplay. Weingarten told Variety, "Our biggest problem is finding a substitute for the homosexual angle, but I'm sure we'll be able to lick it." He also revealed that Elizabeth Taylor was interested in playing the female lead Maggie Pollitt.

Ben Gazzara played Brick Pollitt in the stage production but rejected the film role. Athlete-turned-actor Floyd Simmons also tested for the role. Berman said that they considered William Shatner as a possible Brick. Lana Turner was considered for the part of Maggie before the role went to Taylor.

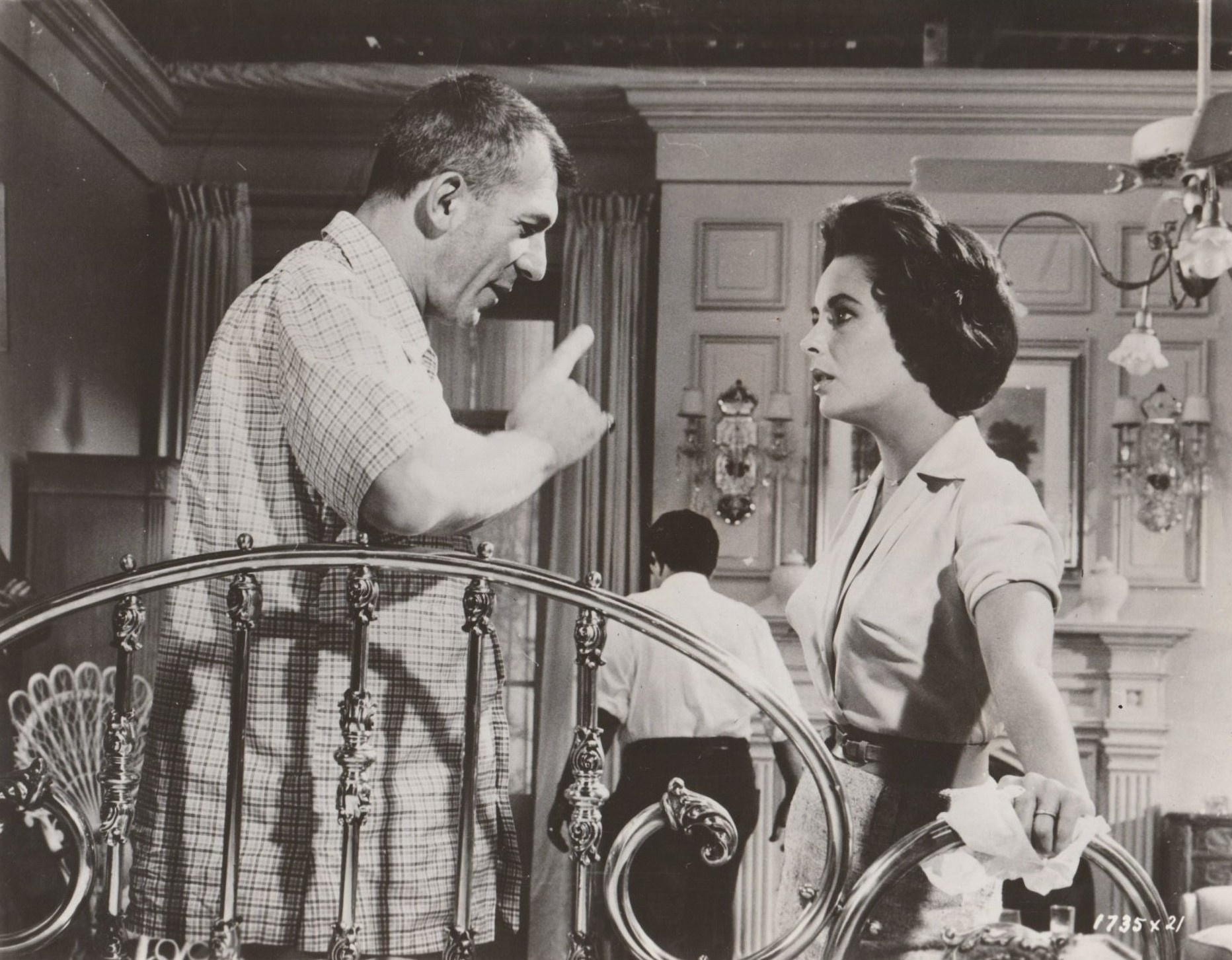
Taylor on the set of Cat on a Hot Tin Roof with director Richard Brooks

The original director was George Cukor, but he left the project after disagreements over the script, particularly how the gay themes were going to be addressed. Berman says he considered Joseph L. Mankiewicz as a possible director, but then asked Richard Brooks to take over.

Richard Brooks had not seen the play. He rewrote the script, later saying, "I tried to keep all of the intentions and most of the dialogue. I added a few scenes. I didn't feel the subject of latent or even overt homosexuality was necessary for this particular story. Also, you have a conditioned audience in a theatre, but if you go to the movies and there's a man on the screen who keeps saying, no, he doesn't want to go to bed with Elizabeth Taylor, then the audience will begin to whistle and hoot.... I had to dramatize that Brick rejects Maggie, not because he is incapable of loving her, but because he holds her responsible for Skipper's death."

Brooks claimed that he cast Paul Newman for the role of Brick "because I could put the camera on him for minutes: in many, many scenes he didn't have to say anything and I could get an interesting personality who could think something, and I could see it in the camera. He was not a big star then."

=== Shooting ===
Production began on March 12, 1958, and by March 19, Taylor had contracted a virus that kept her off the shoot. On March 21, she canceled plans to fly with her husband Mike Todd to New York City, where he was to be honored the following day by the New York Friars' Club. The plane crashed, and all passengers, including Todd, were killed. Beset with grief, Taylor remained off the film until April 14, at which time she returned to the set much thinner and weaker.

Brooks recalled, "I had one set and I was determined not to break through and smash Williams' play.... I tried to give the feeling that it was like a set. So we had one major set: there was a bedroom floor, a ground floor and a basement. I had to move because of the vast amount of dialogue."

== Music ==
"Love Theme from Cat on a Hot Tin Roof" was composed by Charles Wolcott in 1958. He was an accomplished composer, having worked for Paul Whiteman, Benny Goodman, Rudy Vallée, and George Burns and Gracie Allen. From 1937 to 1944, he worked at Walt Disney Studios. In 1950, he transferred to Metro-Goldwyn-Mayer (MGM) Studios, where he became the general music director and composed the theme for Cat on a Hot Tin Roof. The other songs on the soundtrack are by a variety of artists, including André Previn, Daniel Decatur Emmett and Ludwig van Beethoven.

=== Song list ===
- "Lost in a Summer Night" by André Previn and Milton Raskin
- "Nice Layout" by Previn
- "Love Theme from Cat on a Hot Tin Roof" by Charles Wolcott
- "Dixie" by Daniel Decatur Emmett, played by the children on various instruments
- "Skina Marinka", adapted by Marguerite Lamkin, sung by the children
- "I'll Be a Sunbeam" by E. O. Excell, sung by the children
- "Boom, Boom Ain't It Great to Be Crazy", adapted by Lamkin, sung by the children
- "Kermit Returns" by Previn
- "Fourth Movement, Symphony No. 5 in C minor, Op. 67" by Ludwig van Beethoven, played on a radio
- "For He's a Jolly Good Fellow", traditional, sung by the family
- "Some Folks" by Stephen Foster, played on a phonograph
- "Soothe My Lonely Heart" by Jeff Alexander

== Release ==
Cat on a Hot Tin Roof received its world premiere at Loew's State Theatre in Boston on August 23, 1958, before going into general release in the United States on August 27, 1958.

The film was successful with audiences, grossing more than $1 million over the Labor Day weekend, and was number-one at the US box-office for five consecutive weeks in September 1958, before being knocked off the top spot by Damn Yankees. It returned to the top spot for the next four weeks, and became the number-one film for October.

According to MGM records, the film earned rentals for the studio of $7,660,000 in the United States and Canada, as well as $3,625,000 in other markets, resulting in a profit of $2,428,000.

== Reception ==
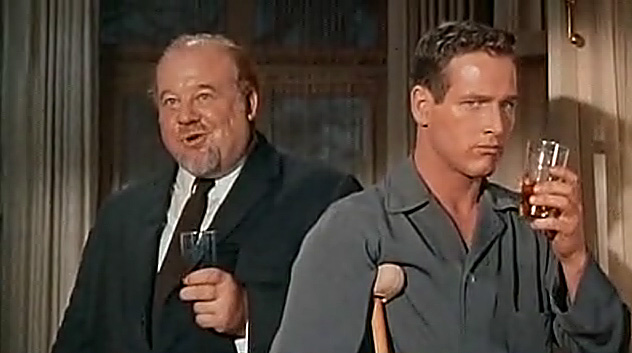
Newman and Ives in a scene from the film

Tennessee Williams was reportedly unhappy with the screenplay, which removed almost all homosexual themes and revised the third act section to include a lengthy scene of reconciliation between Brick and Big Daddy Pollitt. Paul Newman also stated his disappointment with the adaptation. The Hays Code limited Brick's portrayal of sexual desire from Skipper and diminished the play's critique of homophobia. Williams so disliked the toned-down adaptation that he told people waiting in line to see the film, "This movie will set the industry back 50 years. Go home!"

Despite this, the film was highly acclaimed by critics. Bosley Crowther of The New York Times wrote that although "Mr. Williams' original stage play has been altered considerably, especially in offering explanation of why the son is as he is", he still found the film "a ferocious and fascinating show", and deemed Newman's performance "an ingratiating picture of a tortured and tested young man" and Taylor "terrific".

Variety called the picture "a powerful, well-seasoned film produced within the bounds of good, if 'adults only,' taste...Newman again proves to be one of the finest actors in films, playing cynical underacting against highly developed action."

Harrison's Reports declared it "an intense adult drama, superbly acted by a formidable cast".

Richard L. Coe of The Washington Post wrote, "Cat on a Hot Tin Roof has been transposed to the screen with almost astonishing skill...Paul Newman does his finest work in the rich role of Brick, catching that remarkable fact of film acting—the illusion of the first time. It's a superlative performance and he's bound to be nominated for an Oscar."

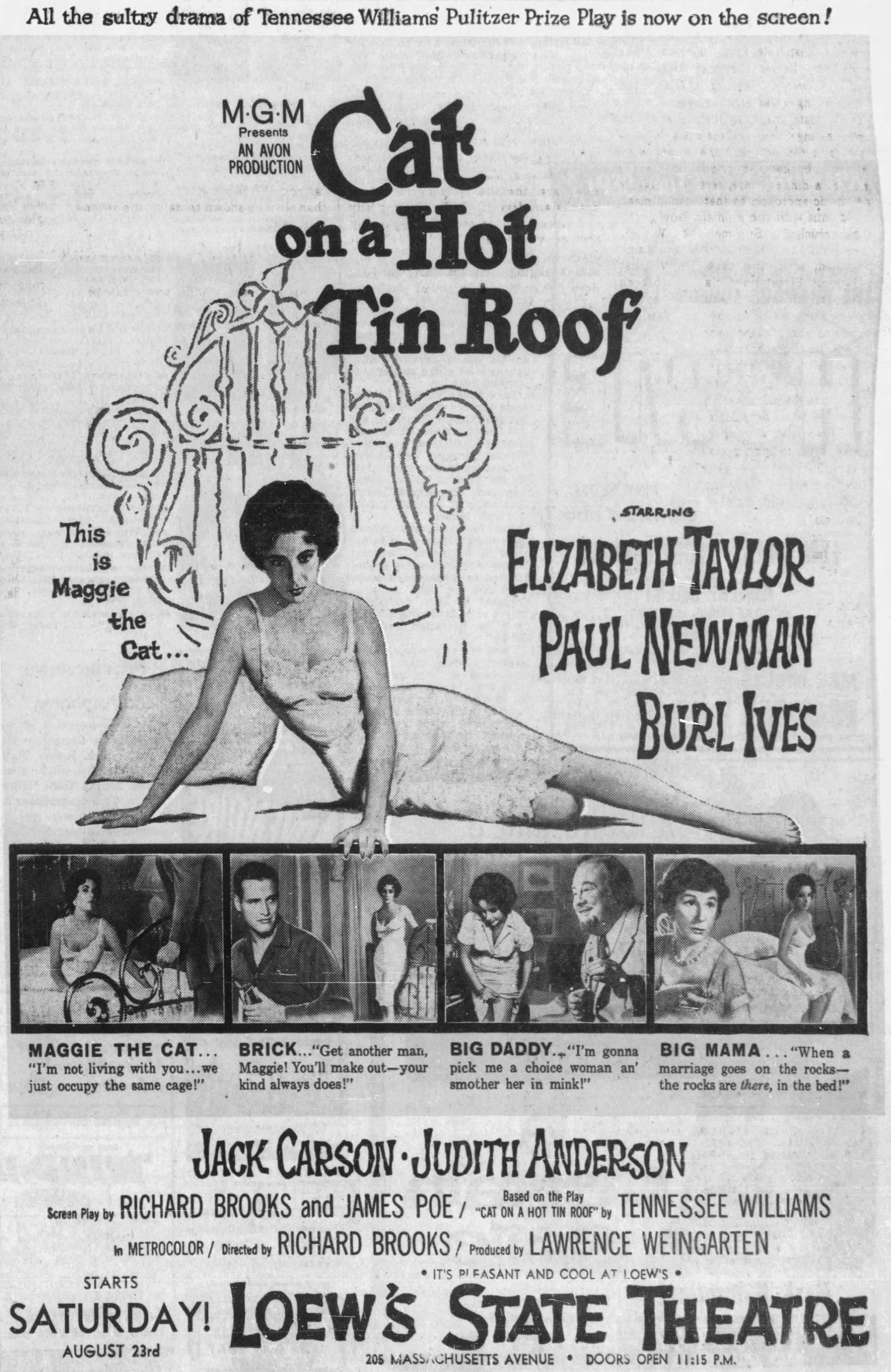
Theatrical advertisement from 1958

Philip K. Scheuer of the Los Angeles Times wrote, "It was a powerful stage drama and it is a powerful screen drama, and Brooks has exacted—and extracted—stunningly real and varied performances from his players...You may not like it but you won't forget it readily."

Not all reviews were as positive. John McCarten of The New Yorker wrote of the characters, "Although it is interesting for a while to listen to them letting off emotional steam, their caterwauling (boosted Lord knows how many decibels by stereophonic sound) eventually becomes severely monotonous." McCarten also lamented that the filmmakers were "unable to indicate more than fleetingly the real problem of the hero—homosexuality, which is, of course, a taboo subject in American movies."

The Monthly Film Bulletin shared that regret, writing, "Censorship difficulties admittedly make it impossible to show homosexuality as the root of Brick's problem, but Brooks does not appear to have the skill to make convincing the motives he has substituted. Most of Williams's exhilarating dialogue has been left out or emasculated, and the screenplay fails to harmonise the revised characterisation of Brick with the author's original conception."

FilmInk argued that the censor-driven changes did not fundamentally change the meaning of Williams' play, in contrast to other adaptations of his work. Film historian and writer Richard Barrios examined the film: "Taking some of the emphasis off Brick's relationship with Skipper may in some ways have made the play's thesis more palatable, but it made for a hole at the center of the film. Some of the problem was camouflaged by the general excellence of the film and its actors ... No wonder the baffled father, in trying to find out what gives, roars with indignation: 'Something's missing here!' " Leonard Maltin gave the film three and a half of four stars: "Tennessee Williams' classic study of "mendacity" comes to the screen somewhat laundered but still packing a wallop; entire cast is sensational."

On the review aggregator website Rotten Tomatoes, 97% of 37 critics' reviews are positive. The website's consensus reads: "Paul Newman and Elizabeth Taylor are at the height of their glamor and performing prowess in this feverish adaptation of Tennessee Williams' play, with a subtext of sexual repression providing an electric undercurrent."

=== Awards and nominations ===
The film received six Academy Award nominations but no awards at the 31st Academy Awards. Best Picture went to Gigi (another Metro-Goldwyn-Mayer production). The same night, Burl Ives won Best Supporting Actor for The Big Country.

Award	Category	Nominee(s)	Result
Academy Awards	Best Motion Picture	Lawrence Weingarten	Nominated
Academy Awards	Best Director	Richard Brooks	Nominated
Academy Awards	Best Actor	Paul Newman	Nominated
Academy Awards	Best Actress	Elizabeth Taylor	Nominated
Academy Awards	Best Screenplay – Based on Material from Another Medium	Richard Brooks and James Poe	Nominated
Academy Awards	Best Cinematography – Color	William Daniels	Nominated
British Academy Film Awards	Best Film from any Source		Nominated
British Academy Film Awards	Best Foreign Actor	Paul Newman	Nominated
British Academy Film Awards	Best Foreign Actress	Elizabeth Taylor	Nominated
Directors Guild of America Awards	Outstanding Directorial Achievement in Motion Pictures	Richard Brooks	Nominated
Golden Globe Awards	Best Motion Picture – Drama		Nominated
Golden Globe Awards	Best Director – Motion Picture	Richard Brooks	Nominated
Laurel Awards	Top Drama		Nominated
Laurel Awards	Top Male Dramatic Performance	Paul Newman	Nominated
Laurel Awards	Top Female Dramatic Performance	Elizabeth Taylor	Won
National Board of Review Awards	Top Ten Films		6th Place
New York Film Critics Circle Awards	Best Director	Richard Brooks	Nominated
Online Film & Television Association Awards	Hall of Fame – Motion Picture		Won
Writers Guild of America Awards	Best Written American Drama	Richard Brooks and James Poe	Nominated

== See also ==
- List of American films of 1958
- Cat on a Hot Tin Roof (1984 film)
