= The Defiant Ones (1986 film) =

1986 television film

- Genre: Drama
- Written by: James Lee Barrett
- Story by: Harold Jacob Smith; Nedrick Young
- Directed by: David Lowell Rich
- Starring: Robert Urich; Carl Weathers
- Music by: Steve Dorff
- Country of origin: United States
- Original language: English

Production
- Executive producers: Robert Urich; Carl Weathers
- Producers: Robert Lovenheim; Robert Urich; Carl Weathers
- Production location: Denver
- Cinematography: Rexford L. Metz
- Editor: Richard Bracken
- Running time: 100 minutes
- Production companies: MGM Television; Stormy Weathers Production; Urich Productions

Original release
- Network: ABC
- Release: January 5, 1986

The Defiant Ones is a 1986 American made-for-television crime drama film directed by David Lowell Rich starring Robert Urich and Carl Weathers. It is a remake of the 1958 film of the same name.

== Synopsis ==
Cullen Monroe and Johnny "Joker" Johnson are prisoners who hate each other and get into a fistfight, causing them to be transported to a different jailhouse by car. During transport they come to blows again, causing an accident. They escape the car but remain chained to each other while Sheriff Leroy Doyle hunts them.

== Cast ==
- Robert Urich as Johnny "Joker" Johnson
- Carl Weathers as Cullen Monroe
- Ed Lauter as Sheriff Leroy Doyle
- Barry Corbin as Floyd Carpenter
- Laurie O'Brien as Pauline
- Thalmus Rasulala as Fred
- William Sanderson as Mason
- Ritch Brinkley as Lonny
- Ebbe Roe Smith as Deputy Miller
- Wil Wheaton as Clyde
- Charles Bartlett as Jeffcoat
- Richard Fullerton as First Guard
- Bob Harris as Driver

== Production and broadcast ==
The film is a remake of The Defiant Ones, the 1958 film that inspired Carl Weathers to become an actor. It premiered on ABC at 9:00 p.m. on Sunday, January 5, 1986.

== Reception ==
In comparing the film to the original version, Walter Goodman of The New York Times wrote that "1986 is not 1958" and joked that the remake is "nothing if not moving. The two keep moving from the opening credits to the close." He further opined that the film contained "enough running music to score the New York Marathon."
