= 1958 New York Film Critics Circle Awards =

24th New York Film Critics Circle Awards

24th New York Film Critics Circle Awards

January 24, 1958
New York, New York, USA

The Defiant Ones

The 24th New York Film Critics Circle Awards, honored the best filmmaking of 1958.

== Winners ==
- Best Film:
  - The Defiant Ones
- Best Actor:
  - David Niven – Separate Tables
- Best Actress:
  - Susan Hayward – I Want to Live!
- Best Director:
  - Stanley Kramer – The Defiant Ones
- Best Screenplay:
  - Nedrick Young and Harold Jacob Smith – The Defiant Ones
- Best Foreign Language Film:
  - Mon Oncle • France/Italy
