= National Board of Review Awards 1958 =

Annual US film awards ceremony

30th National Board of Review Awards

Late December, 1958

The 30th National Board of Review Awards were announced in late December, 1958.

== Top Ten Films ==
1. The Old Man and the Sea
2. Separate Tables
3. The Last Hurrah
4. The Long, Hot Summer
5. Windjammer
6. Cat on a Hot Tin Roof
7. The Goddess
8. The Brothers Karamazov
9. Me and the Colonel
10. Gigi

== Top Foreign Films ==
1. Pather Panchali
2. Rouge et noir
3. The Horse's Mouth
4. Mon Oncle
5. A Night to Remember

== Winners ==
- Best Film: The Old Man and the Sea
- Best Foreign Film: Pather Panchali
- Best Actor: Spencer Tracy (The Old Man and the Sea, The Last Hurrah)
- Best Actress: Ingrid Bergman (The Inn of the Sixth Happiness)
- Best Supporting Actor: Albert Salmi (The Brothers Karamazov, The Bravados)
- Best Supporting Actress: Kay Walsh (The Horse's Mouth)
- Best Director: John Ford (The Last Hurrah)
- Special Citation: Robert Donat (The Inn of the Sixth Happiness)
