= 16th Golden Globe Awards =

Film award ceremony in 1959

- Date: March 5, 1959

The 16th Golden Globe Awards, honoring the best in film for 1958 films, were held on March 5, 1959.

== Winners and nominees ==
=== Film ===
==== Best Film - Drama ====
The Defiant Ones

- Cat on a Hot Tin Roof
- Home Before Dark
- I Want to Live!
- Separate Tables

==== Best Film - Comedy ====
Auntie Mame

- Bell, Book and Candle
- Indiscreet
- Me and the Colonel
- The Perfect Furlough

==== Best Film - Musical ====
Gigi

- Damn Yankees
- Tom Thumb

==== Best Actor - Drama ====
David Niven – Separate Tables

- Tony Curtis – The Defiant Ones
- Robert Donat – The Inn of the Sixth Happiness (posthumous nomination)
- Sidney Poitier – The Defiant Ones
- Spencer Tracy – The Old Man and the Sea

==== Best Actress - Drama ====
Susan Hayward – I Want to Live!

- Ingrid Bergman – The Inn of the Sixth Happiness
- Deborah Kerr – Separate Tables
- Shirley MacLaine – Some Came Running
- Jean Simmons – Home Before Dark

==== Best Actor - Comedy or Musical ====
Danny Kaye – Me and the Colonel

- Maurice Chevalier – Gigi
- Clark Gable – Teacher's Pet
- Cary Grant – Indiscreet
- Louis Jourdan – Gigi

==== Best Actress - Comedy or Musical ====
Rosalind Russell – Auntie Mame

- Ingrid Bergman – Indiscreet
- Leslie Caron – Gigi
- Doris Day – The Tunnel of Love
- Mitzi Gaynor – South Pacific

==== Best Supporting Actor ====
Burl Ives – The Big Country

- Harry Guardino – Houseboat
- David Ladd – The Proud Rebel
- Gig Young – Teacher's Pet
- Efrem Zimbalist, Jr. – Home Before Dark

==== Best Supporting Actress ====
Hermione Gingold – Gigi

- Peggy Cass – Auntie Mame
- Wendy Hiller – Separate Tables
- Maureen Stapleton – Lonelyhearts
- Cara Williams – The Defiant Ones

==== Best Director ====
Vincente Minnelli – Gigi

- Richard Brooks – Cat on a Hot Tin Roof
- Stanley Kramer – The Defiant Ones
- Delbert Mann – Separate Tables
- Robert Wise – I Want to Live!

==== Best Foreign-Language Foreign Film ====
Das Mädchen Rosemarie (West Germany)
L'Eau vive (France)
The Road a Year Long (Yugoslavia)

==== Best English-Language Foreign Film ====
A Night to Remember

==== Best Film - Promoting International Understanding ====
The Inn of the Sixth Happiness

- The Defiant Ones
- Me and the Colonel
- A Time to Love and a Time to Die
- The Young Lions

==== Samuel Goldwyn International Film Award ====
Do Aankhen Barah Haath

==== Henrietta Award (World Film Favorite) ====
Rock Hudson
Deborah Kerr

=== Television ===
==== Best TV Show ====
The Ann Sothern Show
Letter to Loretta
The Red Skelton Show
Toast of the Town
Tonight!

=== Most Promising Newcomer - Male ===
Bradford Dillman
John Gavin
Efrem Zimbalist, Jr.

- David Ladd
- Ricky Nelson
- Ray Stricklyn

=== Most Promising Newcomer - Female ===
Linda Cristal
Susan Kohner
Tina Louise

- Joanna Barnes
- Carol Lynley
- France Nuyen

==== Achievement in Television ====
Red Skelton

=== Special Award ===
David Ladd (For best juvenile actor)
Shirley MacLaine (For most versatile actress)

=== Cecil B. DeMille Award ===
Maurice Chevalier
