= I Want to Live! =

1958 film noir by Robert Wise

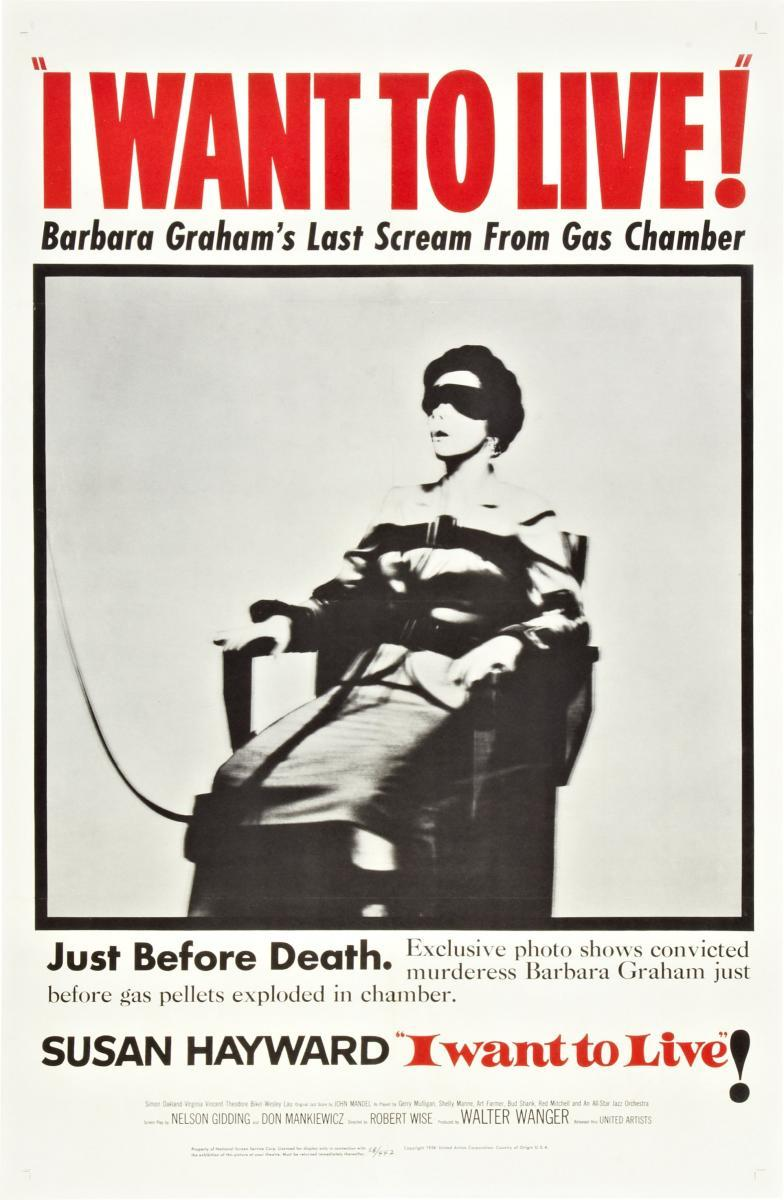
- Theatrical release poster
- Directed by: Robert Wise
- Screenplay by: Nelson Gidding; Don Mankiewicz
- Based on: Articles and letters by Edward Montgomery and Barbara Graham
- Produced by: Walter Wanger
- Starring: Susan Hayward; Simon Oakland; Virginia Vincent; Theodore Bikel; Wesley Lau
- Cinematography: Lionel Lindon
- Edited by: William Hornbeck
- Music by: Johnny Mandel
- Production companies: Figaro, Inc.
- Distributed by: United Artists
- Release date: October 29, 1958
- Running time: 120 minutes
- Country: United States
- Language: English
- Budget: $1.4 million
- Box office: $3.5 million—$5.6 million

I Want to Live! is a 1958 American independent biographical film noir drama film directed by Robert Wise, and starring Susan Hayward, Simon Oakland, Virginia Vincent, and Theodore Bikel. It follows the life of Barbara Graham, a prostitute and habitual criminal, who is convicted of murder and faces capital punishment. The screenplay, written by Nelson Gidding and Don Mankiewicz, was adapted from personal letters written by Graham, in addition to newspaper articles written by Pulitzer Prize-winning journalist Ed Montgomery in the San Francisco Examiner. The film presents a highly fictionalized version of the case, indicating the possibility that Graham may have been innocent.

Released in late 1958, I Want to Live! was a commercial and critical success, garnering favorable reviews from critics for Hayward's performance, as well as the film's realistic depiction of capital punishment. The film earned a total of six Academy Award nominations, with Hayward winning a Best Actress Oscar at the 31st Academy Awards as well as the Golden Globe Award in the same category.

== Plot ==
In 1950 San Francisco, petty criminal and prostitute Barbara Graham faces a misdemeanor charge for soliciting sex. She returns to her native San Diego, but is soon charged with perjury after she provides two criminal friends a false alibi. She subsequently returns to prostitution and other criminal activities to make a living and begins working for thief Emmett Perkins by luring men to his gambling parlor. Barbara manages to earn a significant amount of money, and quits working for Emmett to marry Hank, her third husband. The couple have a son, Bobby, but their marriage is in turmoil because of Hank's heroin addiction and physical abuse.

Barbara forces Hank to leave, but she is soon evicted from her apartment. Desperate, she leaves Bobby in the care of Hank's mother and returns to working for Emmett, who is now associated with thugs John Santo and Bruce King. Police crack down on the operation and Barbara surrenders. During the interrogation, she is stunned when authorities accuse her of helping Perkins and Santo murder Mabel Monohan, an elderly Burbank woman. Barbara insists that she was home with her husband and son on the night of the murder but is indicted by a grand jury. Barbara's childhood friend Peg visits her in jail and agrees to help care for Bobby.

Attorney Richard Tibrow is assigned to Barbara's case and informs her that her alibi is meaningless unless Hank can corroborate it. Barbara furtively concocts a phony alibi with Ben Miranda, supposedly a friend of a fellow prisoner. At the trial, it is revealed that Ben is a police officer who recorded her confession with a hidden microphone during their meeting. Barbara insists that she sought the false alibi only to avoid the death penalty, and that her admission is false. She is ultimately convicted, along with Emmett and John, and all three are sentenced to death.

Tibrow withdraws from Barbara's case and is replaced by Al Matthews. In prison, Barbara is relentlessly defiant, refusing to wear her uniform and demanding a radio. Matthews has psychologist Carl Palmberg evaluate Barbara, hoping to ultimately administer a lie detection test. After visiting with her, Carl states that while Barbara appears to be amoral, she is averse to violence. He also observes that she is left-handed, and the murder was committed by a right-handed person. Journalist Edward Montgomery, who has covered Barbara's case all along, questions her conviction and publishes a sympathetic series of articles describing her troubled life. As her execution date draws near, Barbara grows increasingly anxious. A Supreme Court stay gives her hope that her sentence may be commuted, but it is overturned when Carl dies unexpectedly of heart disease. Al's petition for a retrial is denied, and Barbara's execution date is set.

The day before her execution, a demoralized Barbara is transferred to San Quentin Prison, where she meets with a priest. That evening, she is angered to hear that multiple couples are seeking to adopt her son. She stays awake all night, wistfully recounting to a prison nurse her marriage with Hank. In the morning, 45 minutes before Barbara's scheduled execution, California governor Goodwin J. Knight declares a stay, but her attorney Al's writ is invalidated and the execution is ordered to proceed. Barbara is taken to the gas chamber, but the execution is again halted when Al's amended writ is declared.

The uncertainty and desperation surrounding her fate reduces Barbara to hysterics. She is returned to her cell, where she and the prison staff wait several minutes for a response to Al's writ. They are informed that it has again been rejected and that Barbara's execution is to proceed immediately. Before entering the gas chamber, Barbara demands a mask, as she does not want to see the faces of the witnesses to what she regards as her murder. She is strapped to the chair and executed with cyanide gas. After Barbara is pronounced dead, a despondent Edward Montgomery leaves the prison. On his way out, he is met by Al, who gives him a note from Barbara thanking him for his efforts to help her.

== Cast ==
- Susan Hayward as Barbara Graham
- Simon Oakland as Edward S. "Ed" Montgomery
- Virginia Vincent as Peg
- Theodore Bikel as Carl G.G. Palmberg
- Wesley Lau as Henry L. Graham
- Philip Coolidge as Emmett Perkins
- Lou Krugman as John R. "Jack" Santo
- James Philbrook as Bruce King
- Bartlett Robinson as District Attorney Milton
- Marion Marshall as Rita (uncredited)
- Gage Clarke as Attorney Richard G. Tibrow (credited surname as "Clark")
- Joe De Santis as Al Matthews
- John Marley as Father Devers
- Raymond Bailey as San Quentin Warden
- Gertrude Flynn as San Quentin Matron
- Russell Thorson as San Quentin Sergeant
- Dabbs Greer as the San Quentin Captain
- Stafford Repp as the police Sergeant
- Gavin MacLeod as the police Lieutenant
- Alice Backes as Barbara the San Quentin Nurse
- Wendell Holmes as the police detective
- George Putnam as himself
- Peter Breck as Ben Miranda (uncredited)

== Accuracy ==
According to historian Kathleen Cairns, I Want to Live! "implied that Graham's guilt or innocence was largely irrelevant, that the real crime was committed by a justice system that framed her and a media that abetted the effort... In reality, the film took liberty with many facts of the case." The film also suggests that Graham, though believed to have sociopathic tendencies in real life, was dangerous only to herself as a result of her loveless childhood and abusive mother.

A prologue and epilogue contributed to the film by Edward Montgomery, the journalist who covered Graham's case for the San Francisco Examiner, characterize the film's content, which largely portrays Graham as innocent of the murder, as factual. However, there may have been substantial evidence of Graham's complicity in the crime, including her taped confession to an undercover officer. In an interview with Robert Osborne, Susan Hayward admitted that her research on the evidence and letters in the case led her to believe that Graham was guilty.

Despite some of the liberties taken with Graham's story, the film's depiction of the California gas chamber was regarded as accurate.

== Production ==
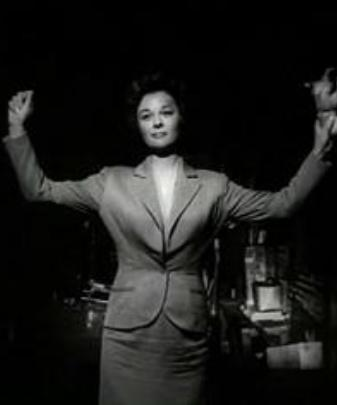
Susan Hayward in the trailer for I Want to Live!

=== Development ===
The film's screenplay was originally written by Don Mankiewicz based on letters by convicted murderer Barbara Graham, who was executed in 1955, and a series of articles by journalist Edward S. Montgomery. In early 1958, after a draft of the screenplay was completed, Nelson Gidding was commissioned to write a redraft and tighten the narrative as it "lacked focus" and contained too many pages concentrating on Graham's troubled childhood. Gidding's redraft omitted any depiction of the murder of Mable Monohan as well as Graham's months spent at San Quentin State Prison during her appeals.

=== Casting ===
When questioned about taking the controversial role, Susan Hayward said: "I just had to play her. If I hadn't thought they should make [the film], I wouldn't have played the part."

=== Filming ===
Principal photography began in March 1958. Production was stopped after Hayward contracted measles.

To ensure that the execution sequence was depicted as accurately as possible, Wise attended a public execution at San Quentin. Hayward commented after completing filming that her simulated experience of execution convinced her that the practice was "medieval."

=== Musical score ===
In addition to Mandel's score, the film features jazz themes performed by Gerry Mulligan's combo. Two soundtrack albums were released by United Artists Records in 1958.

== Release ==
Although some sources state that the film grossed $3.5 million, the Walter Wanger biography Walter Wanger, Hollywood Independent indicated that the film grossed $5,641,711, with a net profit of $2,455,570. Hayward was entitled to 37% of the film's overall profit.

== Reception ==
Upon release, I Want to Live! was met with a largely favorable critical response, with many critics heralding the film as an "indictment against capital punishment," citing its clinical, harrowing depiction of execution. Producer Walter Wanger received numerous congratulatory letters praising the film after its release, including those from writers Arthur Miller, Paddy Chayefsky, Leon Uris and Albert Camus, all of whom were ardent opponents of capital punishment.

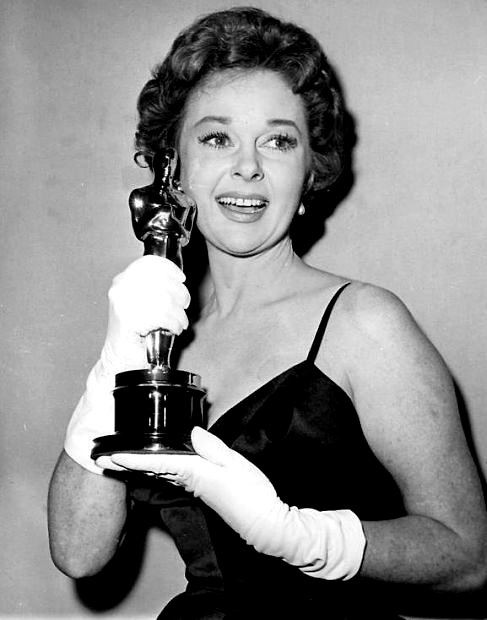
Hayward received an Oscar for her portrayal of Barbara Graham.

Susan Hayward received acclaim for her performance. Bosley Crowther of The New York Times wrote: "Miss Hayward plays it superbly, under the consistently sharp direction of Robert Wise, who has shown here a stunning mastery of the staccato realistic style. From a loose and wise-cracking B-girl she moves onto levels of cold disdain and then plunges down to depths of terror and bleak surrender as she reaches the end. Except that the role does not present us a precisely pretty character, its performance merits for Miss Hayward the most respectful applause." Crowther later listed the film as among the top ten best of 1958.

Variety positively wrote: "It is hard to think of any other star except Miss Hayward who could bring off this complex characterization. She gives a performance that undoubtedly will return her, after a recent hiatus, to the top of popular and critical lists." Harrison's Reports wrote the film was a "grim but powerfully gripping drama" and felt Hayward was "nothing short of superb, and her performance should make her a leading contender for this year's Academy Award." John L. Scott of the Los Angeles Times felt Hayward gave "a sensational, nerve-shattering performance in the new feature as the complex central character. Certainly this portrayal is worthy of Academy Award consideration." To the contrary, John McCarten of The New Yorker wrote Hayward "is as defiant as she can be, but the brittle, wisecracking dialogue she has been provided with soon gets monotonous, and she never does establish Mrs. Graham as a plausible character."

On the film's depiction of capital punishment, Variety called I Want to Live! "probably the most damning indictment of capital punishment ever documented in any media." Time magazine observed more critically: "The heroine, according to the script, is not punished for something she did, but for something she did not do. Is it an attack on the practice of capital punishment? Possibly. But the script spends no sympathy on the two men convicted as the heroine's accomplices, who meet the same fate as she does. Well then, what is it?" McCarten wrote the film was "morbidly engrossing", but "when the last legal maneuver has failed and the horrifying business is done, the film turns out to have no content beyond its shocking documentary review of the way capital punishment is meted out."

Gene Blake, the reporter who covered the actual murder trial for the Los Angeles Daily Mirror, called the film "a dramatic and eloquent piece of propaganda for the abolition of the death penalty." William H. Parker, then-police chief of the Los Angeles Police Department (LAPD), stated, "This movie has an unjustified premise that an innocent woman was driven to her death. In reality, chances are we would never have had a murder on our hands if it wasn't for Barbara Graham. Her accomplices went to the Monahan home in search of a cache of money they erroneously thought the elderly widow had in her house. It was Barbara who pistol-whipped and strangled the poor woman to death."

By March 1959, Billboard noted that the popularity of the film and of Mandel's and Mulligan's albums "prompted a rush of jazz film scores" and cited as examples Duke Ellington's score for Anatomy of a Murder, the release of The Five Pennies (a biopic about the jazz band leader Red Nichols) and the 1960 documentary Jazz on a Summer's Day.

In a 1993 reappraisal, film critic Danny Peary wrote that Hayward is "...the actress of that era [the 1940s and '50s] who most needs rediscovery, and the best film to start with is I Want to Live!."

The review aggregator Rotten Tomatoes reports a 94% approval rating based on 18 reviews, with an average rating of 7.9/10.

== Awards and nominations ==
Award	Year	Category	Nominee(s)	Result	Ref.
Academy Awards	1958	Best Director	Robert Wise	Nominated	
Academy Awards	1958	Best Actress	Susan Hayward	Won	
Academy Awards	1958	Best Screenplay – Based on Material from Another Medium	Don Mankiewicz and Nelson Gidding	Nominated	
Academy Awards	1958	Best Cinematography – Black-and-White	Lionel Lindon	Nominated	
Academy Awards	1958	Best Film Editing	William Hornbeck	Nominated	
Academy Awards	1958	Best Sound	Gordon E. Sawyer	Nominated	
American Film Institute's 10 Top 10	2008	Courtroom Drama Film		Nominated	
British Academy Film Awards	1959	Best Foreign Actress	Susan Hayward	Nominated	
David di Donatello Awards	1959	Best Foreign Actress	Susan Hayward	Won	
Directors Guild of America Awards	1959	Outstanding Directorial Achievement in Motion Pictures	Robert Wise	Nominated	
Golden Globe Awards	1959	Best Motion Picture – Drama		Nominated	
Golden Globe Awards	1959	Best Actress in a Motion Picture – Drama	Susan Hayward	Won	
Golden Globe Awards	1959	Best Director – Motion Picture	Robert Wise	Nominated	
Grammy Awards	1959	Best Sound Track Album, Dramatic Picture Score or Original Cast	Johnny Mandel	Nominated	
Laurel Awards	1959	Top Drama		Nominated	
Laurel Awards	1959	Top Female Dramatic Performance	Susan Hayward	Nominated	
Laurel Awards	1959	Top Cinematography – Black-and-White	Lionel Lindon	Nominated	
Laurel Awards	1959	Best Score	Johnny Mandel	Nominated	
Mar del Plata International Film Festival	1958	Best Film	Robert Wise	Nominated	
Mar del Plata International Film Festival	1958	Best Actress	Susan Hayward	Won	
New York Film Critics Circle Awards	1958	Best Actress	Susan Hayward	Won	
Sant Jordi Awards	1958	Best Foreign Actress	Susan Hayward	Won	
Writers Guild of America Awards	1959	Best Written American Drama	Nelson Gidding and Don Mankiewicz	Nominated	

=== Home media ===
MGM Home Entertainment released I Want to Live! on DVD on May 7, 2002. Kino Lorber reissued the film on DVD featuring a restored print in October 2015. In November 2016, Twilight Time released the film on Blu-ray disc in a limited edition of 3,000 units.

== Adaptation ==
I Want to Live! was remade for television in 1983. The television film features Lindsay Wagner, Martin Balsam, Pamela Reed, Harry Dean Stanton, Dana Elcar, Ellen Geer, Robert Ginty and Barry Primus.

== Sources ==
- Bernstein, Matthew (2000). Walter Wanger: Hollywood Independent. Minneapolis, Minnesota: University of Minnesota Press. ISBN 978-0-816-63548-1.
- Cairns, Kathleen (2013). Proof of Guilt: Barbara Graham and the Politics of Executing Women in America. Lincoln, Nebraska: University of Nebraska Press. ISBN 978-0-803-23009-5.
- Gilmore, John (2005). L.A. Despair: A Landscape of Crimes and Bad Times. Los Angeles, California: Amok Books. ISBN 978-1-878-92316-5.
- Papke, David Ray (2012). Law and Popular Culture: Text, Notes, and Questions. New York City, New York: LexisNexis. ISBN 978-0-769-84753-5.
- Peary, Danny (1993). Alternate Oscars: One Critic's Defiant Choices for Best Picture, Actor, and Actress — From 1927 to the Present. New York City, New York: Delta. ISBN 978-0-385-30332-3.
