= On the Beach (1959 film) =

1959 film by Stanley Kramer

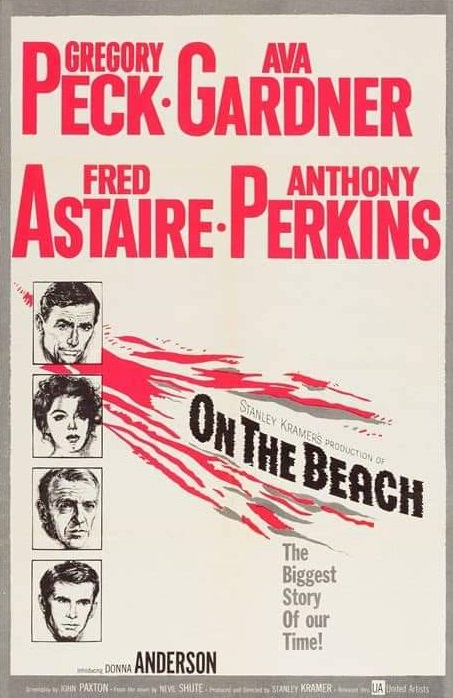
- Directed by: Stanley Kramer
- Screenplay by: John Paxton
- Based on: On the Beach; 1957 novel by Nevil Shute
- Produced by: Stanley Kramer
- Starring: Gregory Peck; Ava Gardner; Fred Astaire; Anthony Perkins; Donna Anderson
- Cinematography: Giuseppe Rotunno
- Edited by: Frederic Knudtson
- Music by: Ernest Gold
- Production companies: Lomitas Productions Inc. Spinel Entertainment
- Distributed by: United Artists
- Release date: December 17, 1959
- Running time: 134 minutes
- Country: United States
- Language: English
- Budget: $2.9 million
- Box office: $2.2 million

On the Beach is a 1959 American apocalyptic science fiction drama film, starring Gregory Peck, Ava Gardner, Fred Astaire, and Anthony Perkins. Produced and directed by Stanley Kramer, it is based on Nevil Shute's 1957 novel of the same title depicting the aftermath of a nuclear war. Unlike the novel, no one is assigned blame for starting the war, which attributes global annihilation to fear, compounded by accident or misjudgment. The film received mixed reviews from critics.

The film was nominated for multiple awards, including at the Oscars for film editing and score. It was awarded a Japanese Blue Ribbon Award and a "United Nations Award" at the British Academy Film Awards. Ernest Gold's score won the 1960 Golden Globe.

== Plot ==
Set in the then future year of 1964, World War III has devastated the Northern Hemisphere, killing all humans there. The cobalt bomb's fallout is elevated compared to that of atomic bombs and hydrogen bombs. Air currents are slowly carrying the fallout to the Southern Hemisphere, where Melbourne, Australia will be the last major city on Earth to perish.

The American nuclear submarine USS Sawfish, commanded by Capt. Dwight Towers, arrives in Melbourne and is placed under Royal Australian Navy command. Peter Holmes, a young Australian naval officer with a wife Mary and infant child, is assigned to be Towers' liaison. Holmes invites Towers to his home for a party and meets Julian Osborn, a depressive nuclear scientist who helped build the bombs. Towers develops a tentative attraction with Moira Davidson, a lonely alcoholic. Although Davidson falls in love with Towers, he finds himself unable to return her feelings because he cannot bring himself to admit that his wife and children in the United States are dead.

A new scientific hypothesis suggests that radiation levels in the Northern Hemisphere might have fallen faster than anticipated, suggesting that radiation may disperse before reaching the Southern Hemisphere, or at least leave Antarctica habitable. Soon after, the Australians also detect an incomprehensible continuous Morse code signal coming from the region of San Diego, where there should be nobody alive to send it. Towers is ordered to command the Sawfish, with Peter and Julian, on an investigation mission.

Arriving at Point Barrow, Alaska, the sub crew discovers that the radiation levels are not only highly lethal but higher than in the mid-Pacific Ocean, meaning the dispersal hypothesis is wrong; there will be no salvation from the radiation. Stopping next in San Francisco, Sawfish finds the city devoid of life. A crew member with family in the city deserts and swims ashore, so he can die at home.

The submarine next stops at a refinery near San Diego, which has been pinpointed as the source of the mysterious Morse signals. A crew member in a hazmat suit goes ashore and discovers that the power source is still running on automatic control. Nearby, a telegraph key has become entangled in a window shade's pull cord with a half-full Coca-Cola bottle, and is being randomly pulled by an ocean breeze, causing the radio signals.

Sawfish returns to Australia to await the inevitable. Towers is reunited with Davidson at her father's farm. He learns that all U.S. Navy personnel in Brisbane are dead and that he has been given command of all remaining American forces. Osborn, having bought the fastest Ferrari in Australia, races and wins the Australian Grand Prix, in which many racers, with nothing left to lose, die in fiery crashes. Fulfilling Towers' wish, Davidson has leveraged her connections to open the trout season early. Towers and Davidson go fishing in the country. As drunken revelers sing "Waltzing Matilda" in the hotel bar, Towers and Davidson consummate their relationship.

Returning to Melbourne, Towers learns that the first of his crew members has radiation sickness. With little time left, Towers takes a vote among his crew, who decide that they want to return to the United States to die. Osborn shuts himself in a garage with his Ferrari and starts the engine in order to end his life by carbon monoxide poisoning. Others queue to receive government-issued suicide pills at hospitals or clinics. Religious faith is important to Mary, who asks God to forgive them for choosing suicide. Before they swallow their pills with tea, Peter and Mary reminisce about the day when they met on the beach.

Towers says farewell to Davidson at the docks. Choosing duty over love, he takes the Sawfish back to sea. Heartbroken, Davidson watches from a cliff as the Sawfish submerges. Within a few days, the streets of Melbourne are empty and silent. A Salvation Army street banner over the bowed head of a war memorial figure (Note: ”The Driver”, a recast statue by Charles Sargeant Jagger then displayed in the forecourt of the State Library of Victoria.) reads: "There is still time .. Brother".

== Cast ==
- Gregory Peck as Commander Dwight Lionel Towers
- Ava Gardner as Moira Davidson
- Fred Astaire as Julian Osborn
- Anthony Perkins as Lieutenant Peter Holmes
- Donna Anderson as Mary Holmes
- John Tate as Admiral Bridie
- Harp McGuire as Lieutenant Sunderstrom
- Lola Brooks as Lieutenant Hosgood
- Ken Wayne as Lieutenant Benson
- Guy Doleman as Lieutenant Commander Farrel
- Richard Meikle as Davis
- John Meillon as Ralph Swain
- Joe McCormick as Ackerman
- Lou Vernon as Bill Davidson
- Kevin Brennan as Dr. King
- Keith Eden as Dr. Fletcher
- Basil Buller-Murphy as Sir Douglas Froude
- Brian James as Royal Australian Navy Officer
- John Casson as Salvation Army Captain
- Paddy Moran as Stevens
- Grant Taylor as Morgan

== Production ==
As in the novel, much of On the Beach takes place in Melbourne, close to the southernmost part of the Australian mainland. Principal photography took place from January 15 to March 27, 1959. The film was shot in Berwick and Frankston. Some streets under construction at the time in Berwick were named after people involved in the film, such as Shute Avenue (Nevil Shute) and Kramer Drive (Stanley Kramer). (Note: An additional scene was shot in the Melbourne nightclub Ciro's. Among the audience in the scene were several popular Melbourne television personalities, most notably Graham Kennedy. The scene was not used in the finished film.) The film was one of several foreign productions in Australia in the late 1950s.

The beach scenes were filmed at Canadian Bay Beach in Mount Eliza. The exterior of Peter and Mary's house was a real house in Mount Eliza. The General Post Office was used as the Department of the Navy building. Scenes were also filmed at Queenscliff High Light, the Shell Geelong Refinery, Melbourne Public Library, Flinders Street Station and Queen Victoria Memorial Hospital. Because Melbourne lacked conventional film-studio facilities, the production leased the Melbourne Showgrounds from the Royal Agricultural Society of Victoria. The pavilions and office buildings of the complex were converted to a studio. Sets for Julian's garage, the interior of Peter and Mary's house, the lighthouse and the Sawfish submarine interiors were constructed in the Government Pavilion.

The Australian Grand Prix racing sequences were filmed at Riverside Raceway in California and at Phillip Island Grand Prix Circuit. These scenes include an array of late-1950s sportscars, including examples of the Jaguar XK150 and Jaguar D-Type, Porsche 356, Mercedes-Benz 300 SL "Gullwing", AC Ace, Chevrolet Corvette, Swallow Doretti and the Chuck Porter Special, a customized Mercedes 300SL. The cars were driven by notable racers such as Ken Miles and Chuck Stevenson.

The U.S. Department of Defense refused to cooperate in the production of the film and denied access to its nuclear-powered submarines. The British submarine HMS Andrew was used to portray the USS Sawfish. Additional resources were supplied by the Royal Australian Navy, including the use of HMAS Melbourne. The exteriors of the naval base were filmed at Williamstown Naval Dockyard.

Ava Gardner's wardrobe was created in Rome by the Fontana Sisters, three iconic Italian fashion designers who had previously dressed Gardner in The Barefoot Contessa and The Sun Also Rises. Gardner is said to have described Melbourne as "the perfect place to make a film about the end of the world." However, the quotation was invented by journalist Neil Jillett of The Sydney Morning Herald. The quote entered Melbourne folklore very quickly.

Frank Chacksfield's orchestral performance of the love theme from On the Beach was released as a single in 1960, reaching #47 on the Billboard Hot 100 chart.

Nevil Shute, the author of the original novel, was displeased with the final cut, feeling that it contained too many changes at the expense of the story's integrity. After initial collaboration with Stanley Kramer, Shute provided minimal assistance to the production. He felt that the love affair between Towers and Moira ruined a central element of the novel, Towers' fidelity to his dead American wife. The film diverges from the novel in several key aspects. For example, the city of San Francisco is shown to be intact in the film but is destroyed in the book. Several characters differ greatly in their age and physical description, and the film creates some characters that do not appear in the book. At the end of the novel, the submarine is scuttled while Moira ingests suicide pills, but in the film, the submarine returns to the U.S. and Moira's fate is not depicted.

== Release ==
On the Beach premiered in 18 theaters on all seven continents on December 17, 1959. The Hollywood premiere was attended by Astaire and Perkins, director Kramer and other celebrities, including Cary Grant. Gardner attended the Rome premiere, and premieres in New York, London, Tokyo, Stockholm and Melbourne were attended by local and foreign dignitaries. The film also was screened in a theater at Little America in Antarctica. Although the film had no commercial release in the Soviet Union, a special premiere was held in Moscow, which Peck and his wife attended.

== Reception ==
In a contemporary review for The New York Times, critic Bosley Crowther wrote: "In putting this fanciful but arresting story of Mr. Shute on the screen, Mr. Kramer and his assistants have most forcibly emphasized this point: life is a beautiful treasure and man should do all he can to save it from annihilation, while there is still time. To this end, he has accomplished some vivid and trenchant images that subtly fill the mind of the viewer with a strong appreciation of his theme. ... The great merit of this picture, aside from its entertaining qualities, is the fact that it carries a passionate conviction that man is worth saving, after all."

Critic Philip K. Scheuer of the Los Angeles Times wrote: "You may argue all you like over 'On the Beach'—and you will—but almost no one will deny that it is an important motion picture. It is also important AS a motion picture, a distinction by which I mean to call attention to the now-assured mastery, the brilliant economy of statement, with which director-producer Stanley Kramer has coordinated the filmic elements in his depiction of the end of the world."

The film recorded a loss of $700,000. On the review aggregator website Rotten Tomatoes, 77% of 26 critics' reviews are positive.

== Awards ==
Award	Category	Nominee(s)	Result	Ref.
Academy Awards	Best Film Editing	Frederic Knudtson	Nominated	
Academy Awards	Best Scoring of a Dramatic or Comedy Picture	Ernest Gold	Nominated	
Blue Ribbon Awards	Best Foreign Language Film	Stanley Kramer	Won	
British Academy Film Awards	Best Foreign Actress	Ava Gardner	Nominated	
British Academy Film Awards	United Nations Award	Stanley Kramer	Won	
Golden Globe Awards	Best Motion Picture – Drama		Nominated	
Golden Globe Awards	Best Supporting Actor – Motion Picture	Fred Astaire	Nominated	
Golden Globe Awards	Best Director – Motion Picture	Stanley Kramer	Nominated	
Golden Globe Awards	Best Original Score – Motion Picture	Ernest Gold	Won	
Golden Globe Awards	Best Film Promoting International Understanding		Nominated	
Laurel Awards	Top Drama		4th Place	
National Board of Review Awards	Top Ten Films		9th Place	
New York Film Critics Circle Awards	Best Film		Nominated	

== Legacy ==
On the Beach was remade in 2000 as an Australian television film by Southern Star Productions, directed by Russell Mulcahy and starring Armand Assante, Bryan Brown and Rachel Ward. The remake was also based on the 1957 novel by Nevil Shute, but updates the setting of the story to the future year of 2005. It also shifts the cause of nuclear war from the Middle East conflict to a confrontation between the United States and China. The updated narrative also places the crew on the fictional Los Angeles–class USS Charleston (SSN-704) submarine and changes Towers' final actions.

The 2013 documentary Fallout by Melbourne filmmaker Lawrence Johnston explores Shute's life and Kramer's production and direction of On the Beach, with interviews of Shute's daughter, Kramer's wife Karen and Donna Anderson, one of the film's surviving cast members.

== See also ==
- List of American films of 1959
- List of apocalyptic films
- List of underwater science fiction works
- Survival film, about the film genre, with a list of related films
