= Separate Tables (film) =

1958 film

- Theatrical release poster
- Directed by: Delbert Mann
- Screenplay by: Terence Rattigan; John Gay; John Michael Hayes (uncredited)
- Based on: Separate Tables by Terence Rattigan
- Produced by: Harold Hecht
- Starring: Rita Hayworth; Deborah Kerr; David Niven; Wendy Hiller; Burt Lancaster
- Cinematography: Charles Lang
- Edited by: Marjorie Fowler
- Music by: David Raksin (score); Harry Warren and Harold Adamson (song "Separate Tables", sung by Vic Damone (uncredited))
- Production companies: Hecht-Hill-Lancaster Productions; Clifton Productions
- Distributed by: United Artists
- Release dates: December 18, 1958 (New York, USA)
- Running time: 100 minutes
- Country: United States
- Language: English
- Box office: $3.1 million (est. US/ Canada rentals); 244,284 admissions (France)

Separate Tables is a 1958 American drama film starring Rita Hayworth, Deborah Kerr, David Niven, Burt Lancaster, and Wendy Hiller, based on two one-act plays by Terence Rattigan that were collectively known by this title. Niven and Hiller won Academy Awards for Best Actor and Best Supporting Actress. The picture was directed by Delbert Mann and adapted for the screen by Rattigan, John Gay and an uncredited John Michael Hayes. Mary Grant and Edith Head designed the film's costumes.

== Plot ==
In Bournemouth, at the Hotel Beauregard, Major David Angus Pollock tries but fails to hide a newspaper article about himself. His attempt to keep the article from the eyes of the other guests at the residential hotel only succeeds in heightening the awareness of the strict Mrs Railton-Bell and the more relaxed and compassionate Lady Matheson. The two women read in the paper that Major Pollock has pleaded guilty to harassing behavior in a cinema, with several women saying he acted inappropriately. Mrs Railton-Bell wants Major Pollock expelled from the hotel and holds a meeting with other residents to decide the issue before presenting it to the manager, Miss Pat Cooper. Mrs Railton-Bell leads the meeting, arguing for the Major's expulsion, and despite the opposing views of some other residents, she informs Miss Cooper that the Major must leave.

Anne and John, who were formerly married to each other, meet outside. Anne, a great beauty, coolly teases John, informing him that she is engaged; John tells her that he is engaged as well, but does not disclose that he is engaged to the innkeeper, Miss Cooper. John claims that though Anne could have married other men who were wealthier and more important, she chose him, a man in a lower economic class, to manipulate and degrade him. Despite this, John and Anne admit they are still attracted to each other. She asks him to come to her room.

As they walk into the hotel, Miss Cooper tells Anne that she has a phone call. Miss Cooper asks John, knowing that Anne is his ex-wife, to consider the real reason for Anne's visit. John defends Anne at first, claiming that all his misfortunes are his own fault, but changes his mind when Miss Cooper tells him that Anne is talking on the phone to his publisher, the only person who knows that John and Miss Cooper are engaged. John confronts Anne in her bedroom. When she attempts to seduce him, he cruelly tells her that, in the light, he can see that she has aged and without her physical beauty it will be impossible for her to continue to manipulate people. She begs him to stay, but he runs out of the hotel after striking her. Miss Cooper comforts her. Anne reveals that she is not really engaged and has been abusing sleeping pills to ease her pain, even during the day.

The next morning, Mrs. Railton-Bell's downtrodden daughter Sibyl tells Major Pollock that she knows what he did. He explains that he always has been fearful of people and suggests that only in the dark with strangers present can he have sex. Major Pollock tells Sibyl that he and she get along well with each other because they are both afraid of life. As he returns to his room to pack, Sibyl worries he will not find a new home.

When John returns in the morning, Miss Cooper tells him that Anne is emotionally unwell, and asks him to see her before she checks out of the hotel. After John leaves, Miss Cooper attempts to persuade Major Pollock to stay, but he refuses.

When Major Pollock enters the dining room at breakfast, there is an awkward silence until John greets him. The others do the same and cheerfully converse with him. Mrs. Railton-Bell is angered by this and demands Sibyl leave with her. Sibyl refuses to obey her mother's command for the first time ever, and insists on remaining to finish her breakfast. After her mother leaves, she starts to talk to Major Pollock, who decides to stay on at the hotel. As the hotel residents each eat their breakfast at separate tables, John and Anne appear to reconcile, saying they do not know if they can ever be happy, together or apart.

== Cast ==
- Rita Hayworth as Anne Shankland
- Deborah Kerr as Sibyl Railton-Bell
- David Niven as Major David Angus Pollock
- Burt Lancaster as John Malcolm
- Wendy Hiller as Pat Cooper
- Gladys Cooper as Mrs. Maud Railton-Bell
- Cathleen Nesbitt as Lady Gladys Matheson
- Felix Aylmer as Mr. Fowler
- Rod Taylor as Charles
- Audrey Dalton as Jean
- May Hallatt as Miss Meacham
- Priscilla Morgan as Doreen
- Hilda Plowright as Mabel (uncredited)

== Production ==
The film took the two plays and combined them to create a screenplay that introduced some new parts, and stars Rita Hayworth, Deborah Kerr, David Niven, Wendy Hiller, Burt Lancaster, and May Hallatt, who already played Miss Meacham on stage. Variety wrote "Rattigan and John Gay have masterfully blended the two playlets into one literate and absorbing full-length film." The film was nominated for seven Oscars, Best Picture, Best Actress (Kerr), Best Writing, Adapted Screenplay, Best Cinematography (Black and White), and Best Dramatic or Comedy Score, and won two (Niven for Best Actor and Hiller for Best Supporting Actress).

Top billing was divided between Deborah Kerr and Rita Hayworth: Hayworth was billed above Kerr in the posters while Kerr was billed above Hayworth in the film itself, a practice followed by James Stewart and John Wayne four years later for The Man Who Shot Liberty Valance and later by Robert Redford and Dustin Hoffman in All the President's Men (1976).

Burt Lancaster was also co-producer (Clifton Productions, a subsidiary of Hecht-Hill-Lancaster Productions). Rita Hayworth was married to producer James Hill at the time.

Rod Taylor agreed to play a small part in the film because of the quality of the production.

== Reception ==
=== Critical reception ===
Separate Tables encountered a complex reception upon its release. Despite the allure of its star-studded cast, the film faced uncertainty regarding its commercial success due to the narrative's downbeat nature and its divergence from the conventional notions of escapist entertainment. Margaret Hinxman of Picturegoer called the film "a four-star crusade against type-casting." She wrote: "It's almost as if in Separate Tables David Niven, Deborah Kerr, Burt Lancaster, Rita Hayworth are deliberately setting out to pillory the "types" that made them famous." She praised the film as "an absorbing study of human relationships." Jack Moffit of The Hollywood Reporter claimed it would require an audience with a "finer, more selective" taste since "the film qualifies itself to the exacting literary requirements of important tragedy." He added: "It may be hard to sell this to the moviegoing public, but it is eminently worth selling." Variety claimed the story was "bolstered by some of the best performances of the year" and praised the film's producers as deserving credit "for undertaking a story that does not meet the conception of what is generally considered sure-fire material in today's market."

=== Accolades ===
Award	Category	Nominee(s)	Result
Academy Awards	Best Motion Picture	Harold Hecht	Nominated
Academy Awards	Best Actor	David Niven	Won
Academy Awards	Best Actress	Deborah Kerr	Nominated
Academy Awards	Best Supporting Actress	Wendy Hiller	Won
Academy Awards	Best Screenplay – Based on Material from Another Medium	John Gay and Terence Rattigan	Nominated
Academy Awards	Best Cinematography – Black-and-White	Charles Lang	Nominated
Academy Awards	Best Scoring of a Dramatic or Comedy Picture	David Raksin	Nominated
David di Donatello Awards	Best Foreign Actress	Deborah Kerr	Won
Golden Globe Awards	Best Motion Picture – Drama		Nominated
Golden Globe Awards	Best Actor in a Motion Picture – Drama	David Niven	Won
Golden Globe Awards	Best Actress in a Motion Picture – Drama	Deborah Kerr	Nominated
Golden Globe Awards	Best Supporting Actress – Motion Picture	Wendy Hiller	Nominated
Golden Globe Awards	Best Director – Motion Picture	Delbert Mann	Nominated
Laurel Awards	Top Male Dramatic Performance	David Niven	Nominated
Laurel Awards	Top Female Dramatic Performance	Deborah Kerr	Nominated
Laurel Awards	Top Female Supporting Performance	Wendy Hiller	Nominated
National Board of Review Awards	Top Ten Films		2nd Place
New York Film Critics Circle Awards	Best Film		Nominated
New York Film Critics Circle Awards	Best Actor	David Niven	Won
New York Film Critics Circle Awards	Best Screenplay	Terence Rattigan and John Gay	Nominated
Sant Jordi Film Awards	Best Foreign Actor	David Niven	Won
Writers Guild of America Awards	Best Written American Drama	Terence Rattigan and John Gay	Nominated

David Niven won the Academy Award for Best Actor for his role, setting the current record for the shortest performance to win the award.

== Home media ==
Separate Tables was released to DVD by MGM Home Video on December 11, 2001, as a Region 1 widescreen DVD, followed by the Kino Lorber (under license from MGM) to Blu-ray on July 29, 2014.
