= Donna Anderson =

American actress (born 1939)

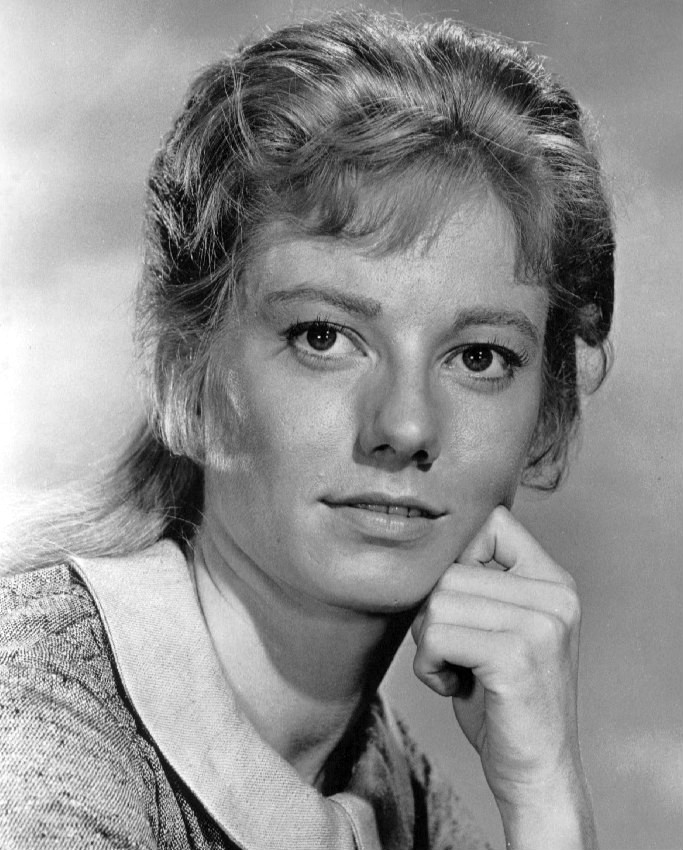
- Anderson in The Travels of Jaimie McPheeters (1963)
- Born: September 5, 1939 (age 87)
- Occupation: Actress
- Years active: 1959–1984

Donna Anderson (born September 5, 1939) is an American character actress, active primarily in television during the 1960s and 1970s.

== Career ==
She made her film debut in 1959 in On the Beach, directed by Stanley Kramer. The following year, Kramer got her to star in Inherit the Wind, which led to her receiving a Golden Laurel nomination for Top New Female personality.

She appeared in a recurring role on the ABC western television series The Travels of Jaimie McPheeters, with Kurt Russell in the title role. In the story line, Anderson's character, Jenny, helps young Jaimie in his travels through the American West on the wagon train. Most of her roles were in television shows with appearances in such series as Gunsmoke, The Incredible Hulk, The A-Team, Murder, She Wrote, Dragnet, and Little House on the Prairie. Her last acting credit was in 1984.

== Filmography ==
Year	Title	Role	Notes
1959	On the Beach	Mary Holmes	
1960	Inherit the Wind	Rachel Brown	
1964	Sinderella and the Golden Bra	Village Maiden	uncredited
1969	The Arrangement	Girl in Motel	uncredited
1970	Count Yorga, Vampire	Donna	(as Donna Anders)
1973	Deadhead Miles	Waitress	
