= The Defiant Ones =

1958 film by Stanley Kramer

- Theatrical release poster
- Directed by: Stanley Kramer
- Written by: Harold Jacob Smith; Nedrick Young
- Produced by: Stanley Kramer
- Starring: Tony Curtis; Sidney Poitier; Theodore Bikel; Charles McGraw; Lon Chaney; King Donovan; Kevin Coughlin; Cara Williams
- Cinematography: Sam Leavitt
- Edited by: Frederic Knudtson
- Music by: Ernest Gold
- Production companies: Stanley Kramer Productions; Lomitas Productions; Curtleigh Productions
- Distributed by: United Artists
- Release dates: June 29, 1958 (Berlin); September 27, 1958 (United States)
- Running time: 96 minutes
- Country: United States
- Language: English
- Budget: $778,000
- Box office: $2.75 million (US and Canadian rentals)

The Defiant Ones is a 1958 American drama film produced and directed by Stanley Kramer. The film was adapted by Harold Jacob Smith from the story by Nedrick Young, originally credited as Nathan E. Douglas. It stars Tony Curtis and Sidney Poitier as two escaped prisoners, one white and one black, who are shackled together and who must co-operate in order to survive.

The Defiant Ones premiered on June 29, 1958, at the 8th Berlin International Film Festival, where Poitier won the Silver Bear for Best Actor. Upon its release in the U.S. on September 27, the film was highly regarded by film critics. It won Academy Awards for Cinematography (Black-and-White) and Original Screenplay and was nominated for seven others, including Best Picture and Best Actor for both Poitier and Curtis.

== Plot ==
One night, in the late 1950s in the Southern United States, a truck loaded with prisoners swerves to avoid another truck and crashes through a fence. The rescuers clear up the debris and discover two prisoners have escaped, an African-American man shackled to a white man because "the warden had a sense of humor." "They will probably kill each other before they go five miles." Nevertheless, a large posse with bloodhounds are dispatched the next morning to track them down. The two missing men are Noah Cullen and Johnny "Joker" Jackson. Despite their mutual hatred, they are forced to cooperate, as they are chained together. At first, their co-operation is motivated by self-preservation, but gradually, they begin to respect each other.

Cullen and Joker flee through difficult terrain and weather, with a brief stop at a turpentine camp where they attempt to break into a general store, in hopes of obtaining food and tools to break the chain. Instead, they are captured by the inhabitants, who form a lynch mob; they are saved only by the interference of "Big" Sam, a man who is appalled by his neighbors' bloodthirst. Sam persuades the onlookers to lock the convicts up and turn them in the next morning. That night, he secretly releases them, being a former chain-gang prisoner himself.

Finally, they run into a young boy named Billy. They make him take them to his home and his mother, whose husband has abandoned his family 8 months prior. The escapees finally are able to cut their chains. When they spend the night there, the lonely woman is attracted to Joker and wants to run off with him. She advises Cullen to go through the swamp to reach the railroad tracks, while she and Joker will drive off in her car. However, after Cullen leaves, the woman reveals that she had lied: She has sent Cullen into the dangerous bogs and swamp to die to eliminate any chance he would be captured and reveal where Joker had gone. Furious, Joker runs after his friend; as he leaves, Billy shoots him in the shoulder.

Wounded, Joker catches up with Cullen and warns him about the swamp. The posse led by humane sheriff Max Muller gets close. The two hear a train whistle and run toward it. Cullen catches up to the train and jumps aboard. Joker runs alongside, desperately trying to catch up. Cullen calls to Joker and holds out his hand. Their hands clasp, but Cullen is unable to pull Joker aboard. Both men tumble to the ground. Too exhausted to run, they realize all they can do is wait for their pursuers. The sheriff finds Cullen singing "Sewing Machine" defiantly with the wounded Joker lying in his arms.

== Cast ==
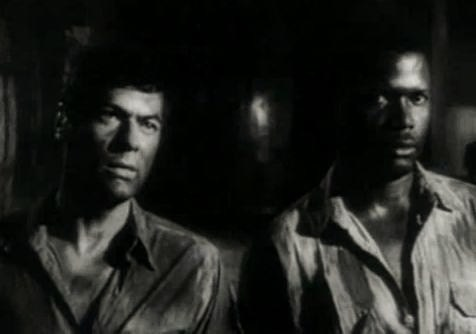
Tony Curtis and Sidney Poitier in the trailer for the film

- Tony Curtis as John "Joker" Jackson
- Sidney Poitier as Noah Cullen
- Theodore Bikel as Sheriff Max Muller
- Charles McGraw as Captain Frank Gibbons
- Lon Chaney Jr. as Sam "Big Sam"
- King Donovan as Solly
- Claude Akins as Mack
- Lawrence Dobkin as Editor
- Whit Bissell as Lou Gans
- Carl Switzer as Angus
- Kevin Coughlin as Billy
- Cara Williams as Billy's Mother

== Production ==
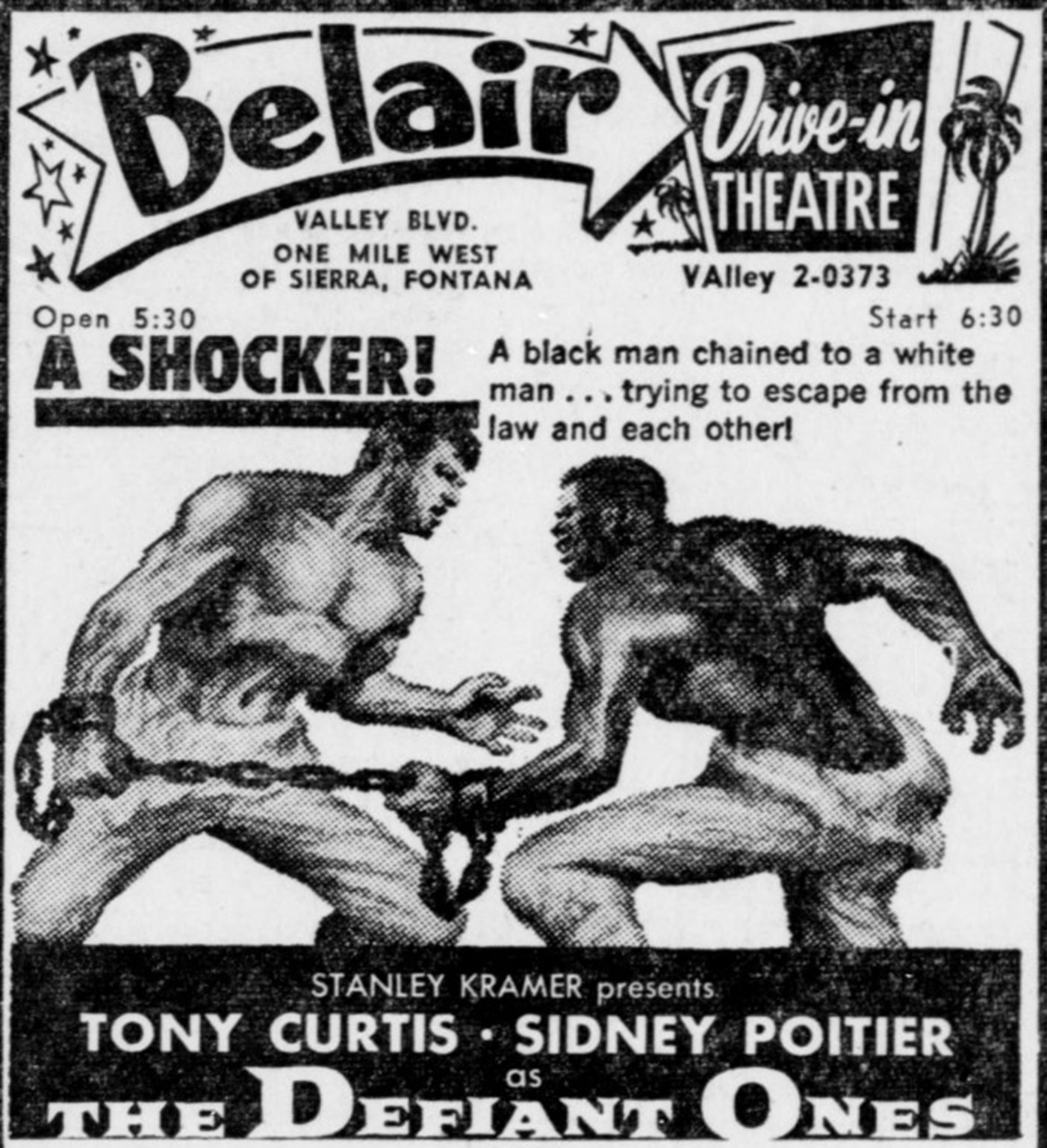
Drive-in advertisement from 1958

Robert Mitchum, a veteran of a Southern chain gang, turned down the role of Jackson because he believed black and white people would not be chained together in the segregated South at that time. Mitchum's reasoning was misinterpreted over the years into the claim that he turned down the film because of his refusal to work with a black man. Kramer wrote that Poitier was initially unsure of Curtis' casting but became supportive. Curtis, however, denied this; he stated that he had contractual rights to approve who would play Cullen. However, despite Curtis' many later claims and stories, Kramer had cast Poitier and Marlon Brando as the two leads when a previous contractual obligation prevented Poitier from being able to accept the role. Kramer wanted Poitier for the role so badly that he delayed the film's production, which led to Brando having to decline because the delay caused shooting to overlap with another obligation. Curtis was cast afterwards. Curtis did request Poitier's name appear with his above the movie title marking a first for Poitier in his career.

Carl Switzer, of the Our Gang comedies, has a small role. It was his last before his death.

In his second autobiography Why Me, Sammy Davis Jr. revealed that Elvis Presley wanted to star with him in this film. However, Colonel Tom Parker, Presley's manager, was against it.

== Reception ==
The film earned rentals of $2.5 million in the United States and Canada but did not perform as well overseas. It ultimately made a net profit of $1 million.

=== Critical response ===
When the film was originally released, Bosley Crowther, film critic for The New York Times, lauded the production and the acting in the film, writing "A remarkably apt and dramatic visualization of a social idea—the idea of men of different races brought together to face misfortune in a bond of brotherhood—is achieved by producer Stanley Kramer in his new film, The Defiant Ones... Between the two principal performers there isn't much room for a choice. Mr. Poitier stands out as the Negro convict and Mr. Curtis is surprisingly good. Both men are intensely dynamic. Mr. Poitier shows a deep and powerful strain of underlying compassion...In the ranks of the pursuers, Theodore Bikel is most impressive as a sheriff with a streak of mercy and justice, which he has to fight to maintain against a brutish state policeman, played by Charles McGraw."

Variety praised the acting and discussed the film's major theme, writing "The theme of The Defiant Ones is that what keeps men apart is their lack of knowledge of one another. With that knowledge comes respect, and with respect comradeship and even love. This thesis is exercised in terms of a colored and a white man, both convicts chained together as they make their break for freedom from a Southern prison gang. The performances by Tony Curtis and Sidney Poitier are virtually flawless. Poitier captures all of the moody violence of the convict, serving time because he assaulted a white man who had insulted him. It is a cunning, totally intelligent portrayal that rings powerfully true...Curtis delivers a true surprise performance. He starts off as a sneering, brutal character, willing to fight it out to-the-death with his equally stubborn companion. When, in the end, he sacrifices a dash for freedom to save Poitier, by saving him from the swamp, he has managed the transition with such skill that sympathy is completely with him."

On Rotten Tomatoes, the film holds a rating of 90%, based on 58 reviews. The website's critics consensus reads, "An advocacy drama that makes its points without belaboring them, The Defiant Ones relies on its clever concept and brilliant performances to repudiate racial prejudice."

The February 2020 issue of New York Magazine voted The Defiant Ones as among "The Best Movies That Lost Best Picture at the Oscars."

=== Awards and nominations ===
Award	Category	Subject	Result
Academy Awards	Best Picture	Stanley Kramer	Nominated
Academy Awards	Best Director	Stanley Kramer	Nominated
Academy Awards	Best Actor	Tony Curtis	Nominated
Academy Awards	Best Actor	Sidney Poitier	Nominated
Academy Awards	Best Supporting Actor	Theodore Bikel	Nominated
Academy Awards	Best Supporting Actress	Cara Williams	Nominated
Academy Awards	Best Story and Screenplay – Written Directly for the Screen	Nedrick Young and Harold Jacob Smith	Won
Academy Awards	Best Cinematography – Black-and-White	Sam Leavitt	Won
Academy Awards	Best Film Editing	Frederic Knudtson	Nominated
Bambi Awards	Best Actor – International	Tony Curtis	Nominated
Bodil Awards	Best American Film	Stanley Kramer	Won
Berlin International Film Festival	Golden Bear	Stanley Kramer	Nominated
Berlin International Film Festival	Silver Bear	Sidney Poitier	Won
British Academy Film Awards	Best Film of any Source		Nominated
British Academy Film Awards	Best Foreign Actor	Tony Curtis	Nominated
British Academy Film Awards	Best Foreign Actor	Sidney Poitier	Won
Directors Guild of America Awards	Outstanding Directorial Achievement in Motion Pictures	Stanley Kramer	Nominated
Edgar Allan Poe Awards	Best Motion Picture	Nedrick Young and Harold Jacob Smith	Won
Golden Globe Awards	Best Motion Picture – Drama		Won
Golden Globe Awards	Best Actor in a Motion Picture – Drama	Tony Curtis	Nominated
Golden Globe Awards	Best Actor in a Motion Picture – Drama	Sidney Poitier	Nominated
Golden Globe Awards	Best Supporting Actress – Motion Picture	Cara Williams	Nominated
Golden Globe Awards	Best Director – Motion Picture	Stanley Kramer	Nominated
Golden Reel Awards	Best Sound Editing – Feature Film		Won
Laurel Awards	Top Drama		4th Place
Laurel Awards	Top Male Dramatic Performance	Sidney Poitier	Nominated
Laurel Awards	Top Male Supporting Performance	Theodore Bikel	5th Place
Laurel Awards	Top Cinematography – Black and White	Sam Leavitt	Won
Laurel Awards	Top Score	Ernest Gold	5th Place
New York Film Critics Circle Awards	Best Film		Won
New York Film Critics Circle Awards	Best Director	Stanley Kramer	Won
New York Film Critics Circle Awards	Best Screenplay	Nedrick Young and Harold Jacob Smith	Won
Writers Guild of America Awards	Best Written American Drama	Nedrick Young and Harold Jacob Smith	Won

American Film Institute

- AFI's 100 Years...100 Cheers - #55

== Remakes and parodies ==
The basis of The Defiant Ones was revisited several times in popular media:

- Lenny Bruce parodied the film on his 1960 album I Am Not a Nut, Elect Me! (Togetherness).
- Warner Bros. parodied the film in Friz Freleng's 1961 cartoon D' Fightin' Ones, in which Sylvester the Cat escapes from captivity in a dogcatcher truck while chained to a bulldog.
- On his 1964 debut LP, Godfrey Cambridge parodied the film, re-writing the final scene so that Cullen makes it onto the train without his white companion, to which Cullen (played by Cambridge) says "Byeeee, baby...!"
- Teruo Ishii modeled his 1965 film Abashiri Prison on The Defiant Ones.
- In 1972, the story changed the gender of the protagonists in the film Black Mama White Mama, starring Pam Grier and Margaret Markov.
- Another 1972 B-movie added a science fiction blaxploitation twist as The Thing with Two Heads, in which a racist white man (played by Ray Milland) has his head grafted onto the body of a living black man (played by Rosey Grier).
- A pair of Marvel Comics supervillains called Hammer and Anvil were parodies of the film's leads.
- In 1986, the film was remade for television, starring Robert Urich and Carl Weathers.
- The 1987 G.I. Joe: The Movie has the temporarily blinded Roadblock and the former Cobra Commander working together to escape Cobra-La; this was a deliberate reference to The Defiant Ones by writer Buzz Dixon.
- The film was paid homage to by the 1992 Quantum Leap episode "Unchained", in which protagonist Sam Beckett lands in the body of a white Mississippi road-gang worker chained to a wrongly convicted black man, and the two must escape together or be murdered by the corrupt warden.
- In 1996, the film Fled featured a dramatic sequence inspired by the film when Laurence Fishburne and Stephen Baldwin are handcuffed to each other in a Georgia jail.
- The film was unofficially remade in Hindi by Bollywood (Indian cinema) titled Kachche Dhaage starring Ajay Devgan and Saif Ali Khan. The story was changed to a different setting to enable the protagonists to be chained together while settling their differences on the run.
- The 2018 western video game Red Dead Redemption 2 features an optional questline where the player can help two chain gang escapees, a white man named Mr. Black and a black man named Mr. White, evade the law after being wrongfully convicted of a crime, or hand them over to the authorities for their bounties.

== See also ==
- List of American films of 1958
