= Philip Coolidge =

American actor (1908–1967)

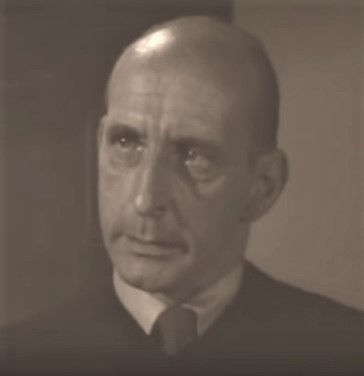
- Coolidge in a 1959 episode of the NBC series The Lawless Years
- Born: August 5, 1908; Concord, Massachusetts, U.S.
- Died: May 23, 1967 (aged 58); Los Angeles, California, U.S.
- Occupation(s): Actor, stage director
- Years active: 1930–1967
- Spouses: None

Philip Coolidge (August 5, 1908 – May 23, 1967) was an American stage, film, and television actor, who performed predominantly in supporting roles during a career that spanned over three decades, from 1930 to the late 1960s.

== Early life ==
Born in Concord, Massachusetts in 1908, Philip was the youngest of eight children of Mary (née Colt) and Sidney E. Coolidge, who was the treasurer for a local textile company and later the owner of a bleachery. The 1910 federal census documents that the Coolidge household included two live-in maids and a full-time cook, indications that Sydney's executive positions and income provided his family with an upper-class lifestyle. That status also allowed Philip later to attend the prestigious Milton Academy, where he completed his secondary education.

== Stage career ==
Following his graduation from Milton, Philip worked initially in radio, serving as an announcer for a station in Boston. Soon, though, he chose another career path, one as a stage actor. In 1930 he made his debut with the Peabody Repertory Company in Boston, playing four different roles in the troupe's production of Romeo and Juliet. Coolidge over the next several years performed in assorted plays in Boston, at the Globe Theatre in Chicago, and elsewhere with traveling companies. By 1938 he began acting regularly in New York City, where that year he was cast as the church organist Simon Stimson in the original Broadway production of Thornton Wilder's play Our Town, which was presented at Henry Miller's Theatre and co-starred Frank Craven and Martha Scott. Over the next 26 years, even after he expanded his acting career into films and television, Coolidge continued to appear in a wide variety of stage productions, including many more on Broadway. He performed there in the 1940s in plays such as Suzanna and the Elders, In Time to Come, Jacobowsky and the Colonel, Barefoot Boy With Cheek, and The Traitor. Then, in the 1950s, he was cast in The Liar (1950), Legend of Sarah, Darkness at Noon, Barefoot in Athens, The Gambler, The Crucible, as Omar Khayyam in Kismet, and in A Visit to a Small Planet. His final appearances on the "Great White Way" were in the early 1960s as Mr. Nicklebush in Rhinoceros and as the Danish ambassador Voltemand in a modern, highly stylized interpretation of Hamlet directed by John Gielgud and starring Richard Burton.

=== Reputation as stage actor and director ===
Often acknowledged in trade publications and in newspaper reviews for his effective performances in the "legitimate" theatre, Coolidge drew special attention for his work on Broadway in Darkness at Noon (1951) and in The Gambler (1952). The popular trade paper Variety in its January 17, 1951 assessment of Darkness at Noon commends the actor for his "persuasive" representation of a "sardonic political prisoner" trying to survive the brutality and paranoia of a Soviet-style revolution. The following year, in its October 15 review of The Gambler, the critic for Variety includes Coolidge among what he describes as the play's "unusually good" supporting cast, more specifically for the actor's portrayal of Commissioner Costa, "the practical but puzzled trial examiner". While Coolidge was repeatedly recognized as an accomplished theatre actor during his career, by the late 1940s he was also being contracted to direct major productions. For instance, in Washington, D.C., in 1948 he directed the comedy There Goes the Bride, which premiered May 10 that year at the National Theatre and starred Ilka Chase and Robert Alda.

== Films ==
When considering the length of Coolidge's acting career, which lasted nearly 40 years, his filmography appears to be rather modest in length, amounting to only 15 productions. English film historian and critic David Quinlan contends in his 1986 book The Illustrated Encyclopedia of Movie Character Actors that Coolidge was "considerably under-used by Hollywood", that the "Dark, lanky, stoop-shouldered American actor of hangdog aspect" was ultimately only a "visitor" to films when compared to his other work in stage and television productions.

By the late 1940s, Coolidge also began acting in feature films. His first film role, though uncredited on screen, is in the 1947 20th-Century Fox crime drama Boomerang starring Dana Andrews and Jane Wyatt. A few of his subsequent credited appearances include his portrayal of a self-protective small-town mayor in Inherit the Wind (1960), as Dr. Cross in North by Northwest (1959), and as Wilbur Peterson in It Happened to Jane (1959).

== Television ==
In 1958, in the TV Western Gunsmoke, he starred as "Harry Pope", a widower from the east who fled west after the loss of his wife and who was harassed by cowboys because he was different; ultimately he killed two cowboys as they killed him.

Rarely cast as a leading character, Coolidge plays the shopkeeper Throckmorton in the 1962 episode "A Piano in the House" on the classic science fiction series The Twilight Zone. He also portrays William Windom's butler, "Mr. Cooper", in the first season of the 1960s sitcom The Farmer's Daughter.

== Personal life and death ==
Coolidge, who never married, died at age 58 of lung cancer at Cedars of Lebanon Hospital in Los Angeles in May 1967. In accordance with his instructions, no funeral was held and his body was cremated. The veteran actor had continued to perform until shortly before his death, managing to complete the filming of his scenes as the character "Fingers" Felton in the Walt Disney production Never a Dull Moment. That crime comedy, starring Dick Van Dyke, was not released to theaters until June 1968, more than a year after Coolidge died.

== Filmography ==
Year	Title	Role	Notes
1947	Boomerang	Jim Crossman	Uncredited
1956	The Sharkfighters	Lieutenant Commander Leonard Evans	
1957	Slander	Homer Crowley	
1958	I Want to Live!	Emmett Perkins	
1959	The Mating Game	Reverend Osgood	
1959	It Happened to Jane	Wilbur Peterson	
1959	North by Northwest	Dr. Cross	
1959	The Tingler	Oliver 'Ollie' Higgins	
1960	The Bramble Bush	Colin Eustis	
1960	Because They're Young	Mr. Rimer	
1960	Inherit the Wind	Mayor Jason Carter	
1962	Bon Voyage!	Passport Clerk	Uncredited
1965	The Greatest Story Ever Told	Chuza	
1965	The Russians Are Coming, the Russians Are Coming	Mr. Porter	
1968	Never a Dull Moment	Fingers Felton	Released posthumously (final film role)

== Selected television roles ==
Year	Series	Role	Episode
1949	Suspense	Mr. Mason	Season 1 Pilot Episode: "Goodbye New York"
1951	Kraft Television Theatre	Masterson	Season 4 Episode 37: "A Seacoast in Bohemia"
1951	Schlitz Playhouse		Season 1 Episode 2: "The Name is Bellingham"
1951	Schlitz Playhouse		Season 1 Episode 12: "Dark Fleece"
1952	Lux Video Theatre	Lieutenant Colonel Finley	Season 2 Episode 48: "Brigadier"
1953	Lux Video Theatre	Major	Season 3 Episode 46: "The Corporal and the Lady"
1954	Producers' Showcase	Bert Bentley	Season 1 Episode 1: "Tonight at 8:30" (Segment: "Red Peppers")
1955	The Alcoa Hour	Mr. Herbert	Season 1 Episode 4: "Thunder in Washington"
1956	Lux Video Theatre	Malloby	Season 6 Episode 24: "Criminal Code"
1956	Playhouse 90		Season 1 Episode 12: "The Family Nobody Wanted"
1956	Alfred Hitchcock Presents	Henri Tallendier	Season 1 Episode 24: "The Perfect Murder"
1956	Alfred Hitchcock Presents	Talbot	Season 1 Episode 26: "Whodunit"
1956	Alfred Hitchcock Presents	Lieutenant Brandt	Season 1 Episode 37: "Decoy"
1956	Alfred Hitchcock Presents	Bud	Season 2 Episode 3: "Demortuis"
1957	Alfred Hitchcock Presents	Sam Henderson	Season 2 Episode 22: "The End of Indian Summer"
1957	The United States Steel Hour	Mr. Clements	Season 5 Episode 5: "The Locked Hour"
1958	Gunsmoke	Harry Pope	Season 4 Episode 12: "Grass"
1959	Have Gun - Will Travel	Aaron Murdock	Season 2 Episode 33: "Sons of Aaron Murdock "
1959	Tales of Wells Fargo	Old John	Season 4 Episode 11: "End of a Legend"
1959	Schlitz Playhouse	Flaherty	Season 8 Episode 15: "The Rumor"
1959	Alfred Hitchcock Presents	William Tritt	Season 4 Episode 33: "The Dusty Drawer"
1960	Playhouse 90	Albert Bigelow Paine	Season 4 Episode 16: "The Shape of the River"
1961	The Play of the Week	Grivet	Season 2 Episode 25: "Thérèse Raquin"
1961	Route 66	Old Codger	Season 2 Episode 7: "The Mud Nest"
1961	The Defenders	Dr. Lillis	Season 1 Episode 1: "The Quality of Mercy"
1962	Have Gun - Will Travel	Dr. Leopold Avatar	Season 5 Episode 19: "The Mark of Cain"
1962	The Alfred Hitchcock Hour	"Reverend" Locke	Season 1 Episode 3: "Night of the Owl"
1962	Gunsmoke	Len Fetch	Season 7 Episode 18: "Old Dan"
1962	The Twilight Zone	Throckmorton	Season 3 Episode 22: "A Piano in the House"
1962	Ichabod and Me	Samuel Cheever	Season 1 Episode 24: "Big Business"
1962	Ichabod and Me	Cheever	Season 1 Episode 28: "Election Fever"
1962	Target: The Corruptors		Season 1 Episode 15: "A Man is Waiting to Be Murdered"
1963	McKeever and the Colonel	Major Beadle	Season 1 Episode 25: "Blackwell, the Retread"
1963	The Defenders	Joe Lundeen	Season 2 Episode 26: "The Heathen"
1963-1964	The Farmer's Daughter	Chester Cooper	22 episodes
1965	Gunsmoke	Owney Dales	Season 10 Episode 18: "One Killer on Ice"
1965	Bewitched	Mr. Trigby	Season 2 Episode 6: "Take Two Aspirins and Half a Pint of Porpoise Milk"
1965	Walt Disney's Wonderful World of Color	Frank	Season 11 Episode 24: "Kilroy: Part 3"
1965	Walt Disney's Wonderful World of Color	Frank	Season 11 Episode 25: "Kilroy: Part 4"
1966	The Tammy Grimes Show	Abner	Season 1 Episode 4: "Positively Made in Paris"
1966	ABC Stage 67	Farley	Season 1 Episode 1: "The Love Song of Barney Kempinski"
