= Ernest Gold =

20th century Austrian-American composer (1921–99)

- Born: Ernst Sigmund Goldner; July 13, 1921; Vienna, Austria
- Died: March 17, 1999 (aged 77); Santa Monica, California, U.S.
- Education: University of Music and Performing Arts Vienna
- Spouses: Marni Nixon (m. 1950; div. 1969) Jan Keller (m. 1975)
- Children: 3, including Andrew Gold
- Musical career
- Genres: Film score, contemporary classical
- Occupation: Composer

Ernst Sigmund Goldner (July 13, 1921 – March 17, 1999), known professionally as Ernest Gold, was an Austrian-American composer of film and television scores. He won an Academy Award and two Grammy Awards for his work on the film Exodus (1960), and a Golden Globe for On the Beach (1959). He received an additional three Oscar nominations throughout his career, and was the first composer to receive a star on the Hollywood Walk of Fame.

== Early life ==
Gold was born in 1921 in Vienna, the son of Elisabeth (Stransky) and Gustav Goldner. He came from a musical family. His father played the violin and his mother sang. His father also studied under Richard Heuberger.

Ernest Gold said he learned to read music before he learned to read words. He studied violin and piano when he was six and began composing music at eight. By 13, he had written an entire opera. As a child, he said he wanted to go to Hollywood, Los Angeles and be a composer. Gold went to movie theaters as a teenager, not only to watch the films but to listen to the musical score. Among prominent film composers of the time, he admired Max Steiner.

In 1938, Gold attended the Akademie für Musik und darstellende Kunst in Vienna, but he and his family moved to the U.S. after the Nazi Anschluss in Austria, because his family was Jewish. In New York City, he earned money by working as an accompanist and writing popular songs. He also studied with Otto Cesana and Léon Barzin at the National Orchestra Association.

== Career ==
The NBC Symphony Orchestra performed Gold's first symphony in 1939, only a year after he moved to the United States. In 1941, he composed a symphony which was later played at Carnegie Hall in 1945. Also in 1945, he moved to Hollywood to work with Columbia Pictures, his first significant role was writing the score for the melodrama Girl of the Limberlost (1945). Then, Gold wrote scores for other minor films. For the next ten years he worked on B movies, mainly orchestrating and arranging music for western movies and melodramas.

In 1955, Stanley Kramer asked Gold to orchestrate Not as a Stranger for which George Antheil had composed the music. The production opened the door for Gold to work with other scores by Antheil and to orchestrate more of Kramer's films. Gold worked on almost every film Kramer made, including A Child Is Waiting and It's a Mad, Mad, Mad, Mad World. Gold produced his first original film score in 1958 for Too Much, Too Soon. His big break came in 1959, when he was asked to score On the Beach after Antheil became ill and recommended Gold for the job.

Gold is most widely recognized for composing the Oscar and Grammy-winning score of Exodus (1960). He was contracted by Otto Preminger and atypically, was able to watch the movie being filmed. Gold spent time in Israel while writing the score. In 1968, he wrote a Broadway musical called I'm Solomon. He also wrote music for television.

Later, Gold was musical director of the Santa Barbara Symphony Orchestra and founded the Los Angeles Senior Citizens Orchestra. His concert works include a piano concerto, a string quartet, and a piano sonata. Moby sampled Gold's "Fight for Survival" from Exodus for his song "Porcelain".

== Honors ==
For his contributions to the recording industry, Gold has a star on the Hollywood Walk of Fame. He was the first composer to receive the honor.

== Personal life ==
Gold was married to singer and actress Marni Nixon from 1950 to 1969. They had three children: musician Andrew Gold (composer of "Lonely Boy" and "Thank You for Being a Friend"), Martha Carr, and Melani Gold. Ernest Gold and Jan Keller Gold were married from 1975 until his death.

=== Death ===
Ernest Gold died March 17, 1999, in Santa Monica, California, at 77 from complications following a stroke.

== Selected filmography ==
- Smooth as Silk (1946)
- Lighthouse (1947)
- Wyoming (1947)
- Man Crazy (1953)
- The Other Woman (1954)
- Not as a Stranger (1955)
- Fury (1955-1960)
- Affair in Havana (1957)
- The Screaming Skull (1958)
- Too Much, Too Soon (1958)
- The Defiant Ones (1958)
- Tarzan's Fight for Life (1958)
- Battle of the Coral Sea (1958)
- The Young Philadelphians (1959)
- On the Beach (1959)
- Inherit the Wind (1960)
- Exodus (1960)
- A Fever in the Blood (1961)
- The Last Sunset (1961)
- Judgment at Nuremberg (1961)
- Pressure Point (1962)
- A Child Is Waiting (1963)
- It's a Mad, Mad, Mad, Mad World (1963)
- Ship of Fools (1965)
- The Secret of Santa Vittoria (1969)
- Betrayal (1974)
- The Wild McCullochs (1975)
- Cross of Iron (1977)
- Fun with Dick and Jane (1977)
- Good Luck, Miss Wyckoff (1979)
- The Runner Stumbles (1979)
- Tom Horn (1980)
- Safari 3000 (1982)
- Wallenberg: A Hero's Story (1985)
- Dreams of Gold: The Mel Fisher Story (1986)

== Awards and nominations ==
Institution	Year	Category	Work	Result	Ref.
Academy Awards	1960	Best Original Score	On the Beach	Nominated	
Academy Awards	1961	Best Original Score	Exodus	Won	
Academy Awards	1964	Best Original Score	It's a Mad, Mad, Mad, Mad World	Nominated	
Academy Awards	1964	Best Original Song	Title song (from It's a Mad, Mad, Mad, Mad World)	Nominated	
Academy Awards	1970	Best Original Score	The Secret of Santa Vittoria	Nominated	
Golden Globe Awards	1960	Best Original Score	On the Beach	Won	
Golden Globe Awards	1961	Best Original Score	Exodus	Nominated	
Golden Globe Awards	1970	Best Original Score	The Secret of Santa Vittoria	Nominated	
Golden Globe Awards	1970	Best Original Score	"Stay" (from The Secret of Santa Vittoria)	Nominated	
Grammy Awards	1961	Best Score Soundtrack for Visual Media	Exodus	Won	
Grammy Awards	1961	Song of the Year	"Theme of Exodus" (from Exodus)	Won	

== See also ==
- List of Austrians in music
