= Edward S. Montgomery =

American journalist

Edward Samuel Montgomery (December 30, 1910 – April 6, 1992) was an American journalist who won the 1951 Pulitzer Prize for Local Reporting for writing a series of articles on tax fraud.

== Biography ==
Montgomery was born in Fort Collins, Colorado. He graduated from the University of Nevada, Reno in 1934 with a Bachelor of Arts in Journalism.

Upon graduation, Montgomery was hired by the Nevada State Journal, but left the Journal two years later to pursue work in other media. He returned to journalism in 1938, joining the Reno Evening Gazette, where he first worked as an editor. Montgomery served in the Marine Corps during World War II (1942–45).

After the war, Montgomery went to work for the San Francisco Examiner, where he stayed until his retirement in 1975. During his time at the Examiner, Montgomery became involved in two murder trials. He found the body of 14-year-old Stephanie Bryan in May 1955. Burton Abbott was later sentenced to death for her murder. That same year, Montgomery reported on Barbara Graham's execution. His coverage of the Graham case was adapted into the film I Want to Live! (1958).

=== Personal life ===
Montgomery was married to Helene Louise Per Lee (1914–2007), whom he had met in college. They had three children: Diana, Douglas and David.

Montgomery died of pneumonia in San Francisco in 1992.
