= Inherit the Wind (1960 film) =

1960 film by Stanley Kramer

- Directed by: Stanley Kramer
- Screenplay by: Nedrick Young; Harold Jacob Smith
- Based on: Inherit the Wind; 1955 play by: Jerome Lawrence; Robert E. Lee
- Produced by: Stanley Kramer
- Starring: Spencer Tracy; Fredric March; Gene Kelly; Dick York; Donna Anderson; Florence Eldridge
- Cinematography: Ernest Laszlo
- Edited by: Frederic Knudtson
- Music by: Ernest Gold
- Distributed by: United Artists
- Release dates: June 25, 1960 (Berlin Film Festival); July 21, 1960 (Dayton, Tennessee)
- Running time: 128 minutes
- Country: United States
- Language: English
- Budget: $2 million
- Box office: $2 million (worldwide)

Inherit the Wind is a 1960 American drama film directed by Stanley Kramer and based on the 1955 play of the same name written by Jerome Lawrence and Robert Edwin Lee. It stars Spencer Tracy as lawyer Henry Drummond and Fredric March as his friend and rival Matthew Harrison Brady. It also features Gene Kelly, Dick York, Harry Morgan, Donna Anderson, Claude Akins, Noah Beery Jr., Florence Eldridge, Jimmy Boyd and Gordon Polk.

The script was adapted by Nedrick Young and Harold Jacob Smith. Kramer was commended for bringing in Young, as he had been blacklisted and was forced to use the pseudonym Nathan E. Douglas.

Inherit the Wind is a parable that fictionalizes the 1925 Scopes "Monkey" Trial as a means to discuss McCarthyism. Written in response to the chilling effect of the McCarthy-era investigations on intellectual discourse, the film (like the play) is critical of creationism.

A television remake of the film which starred Melvyn Douglas and Ed Begley was broadcast in 1965. Another television remake that starred Jason Robards and Kirk Douglas aired in 1988. It was remade for television again in 1999, co-starring Jack Lemmon as Drummond and George C. Scott as Brady.

== Plot ==
In the 1920s, in the town of Hillsboro, Tennessee, a female voice sings "Old-time Religion" as schoolteacher Bertram Cates is arrested for violating state law by conducting a lesson on Charles Darwin's Descent of Man. The event makes headlines around the world. Matthew Brady, statesman, three-time presidential candidate, and Biblical scholar, volunteers to assist Prosecutor Tom Davenport.

A huge parade welcomes Brady, who asks Rev. Jeremiah Brown to stand beside him as he addresses the crowd. Witty and cynical E.K. Hornbeck of the Baltimore Herald, an influential newspaperman, seizes the opportunity to announce that Cates's defense attorney, provided by the newspaper, will be the equally well-known Henry Drummond, one of America's most controversial legal minds and a notorious agnostic.

Tourists flood the town. Welcoming Drummond, Hornbeck takes him on a tour of the circus Hillsboro has become. Meanwhile, in the courtroom, Judge Coffey deals with reporters, photographers, and local political interests. Later at the hotel, Brady, his wife Sarah, and Drummond reminisce, regretting the loss of the close friendship they once had. That night, Rev. Brown rallies the townspeople, calling down God's vengeance. When his daughter Rachel, who is engaged to Cates, protests, he condemns her. Admonishing Brown’s harshness, Brady quotes Proverbs 11:29: "He that troubleth his own house shall inherit the wind," sending the crowd home.

The film's trailer

Breaching Rachel’s confidence to him and Sarah, Brady calls Rachel to the stand, compelling her to tell how Cates left the church when her father declared that a child who drowned was not worthy of heaven because he was not baptized. Overzealously, Brady browbeats a distressed Rachel; Cates instructs Drummond not to cross-examine her, even though her testimony of Cates’s doubts has damaged him with the jury.

Drummond intends six scientists as witnesses, but the prosecution successfully objects. Frustrated, Drummond gives an impassioned speech of the consequences of allowing an outdated law to prevail, turning progress backward. He asks to withdraw from the case. The judge orders him to show cause the next morning why he should not be held in contempt. John Stebbins, the father of the drowned boy, offers his farm as collateral for Drummond's bail.

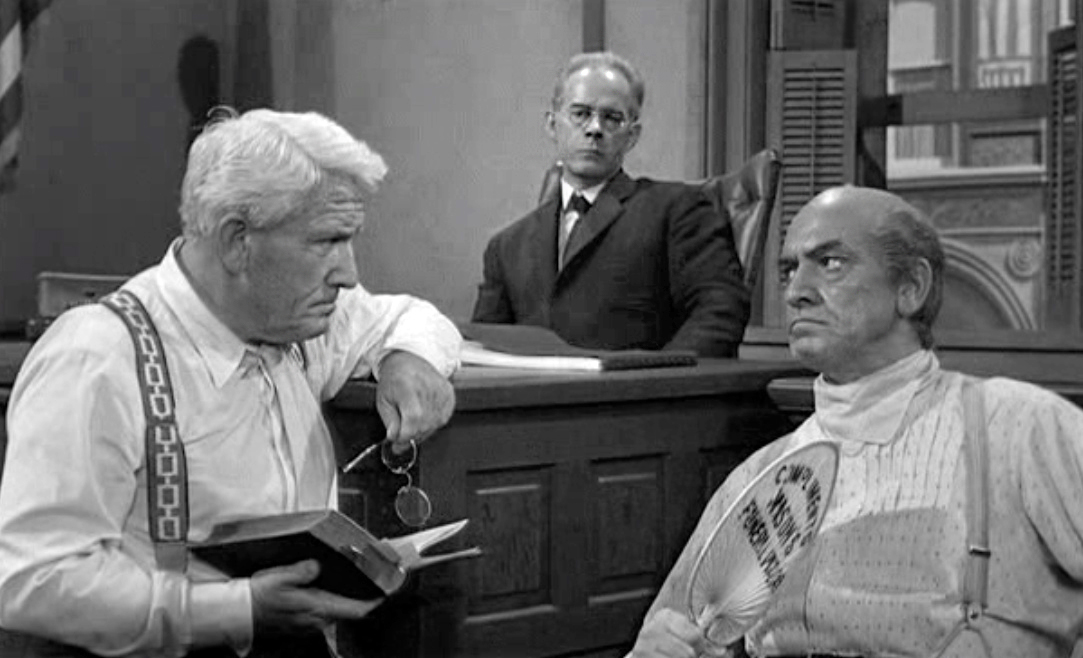
Spencer Tracy, Harry Morgan, and Fredric March during the questioning of Brady by Drummond

That night, the crowds march with a burning effigy chanting that Cates should be hanged. When Drummond tells Hornbeck he needs a miracle, Hornbeck tosses him a Bible, scornfully exclaiming, "Here's a bagful!" Drummond clasps the Bible to his chest, smiling. In court, Drummond makes the unprecedented move of calling Brady—the opposing counsel—as an expert on the Bible, since he has been barred from presenting scientific experts. Brady welcomes this challenge, but he becomes increasingly flustered by Drummond's questions on Biblical inconsistencies and absurdities, such as the “seven days” of creation and Jonah surviving being swallowed by a whale. Brady admits to being unfamiliar with Darwin’s On the Origin of Species. Exposed for his lack of intellectual curiosity, a humiliated Brady is forced to admit that Biblical passages cannot be interpreted literally. He falls into Drummond’s trap to cast doubt on the Bible as the sole credible explanation for human existence.

WGN Radio is in court to announce the guilty verdict. Bowing to political pressure not to give a harsh punishment that would aggravate global opinion of Hillsboro backwardness, the judge fines Cates only $100, which Drummond says he will appeal. A disappointed Brady tries to enter a speech into the record, but Drummond successfully moves that the court be adjourned and the crowd begins to leave. As Brady attempts his speech, which few remain to hear, he collapses and dies. Alone in the courtroom, planning the obituary, Hornbeck asks Drummond what Brady said to Rev. Brown, to which Drummond cites Proverbs 11:29 chapter and verse. Hornbeck marvels at how Drummond can quote scripture yet call himself an agnostic. Drummond accuses Hornbeck of being a heartless cynic, a lonely man who will be buried alone. As he leaves, Hornbeck responds confidently that Drummond will be there. Drummond picks up the Bible and Darwin's book in either hand, balancing them as the voice from the beginning sings, "Mine eyes have seen the glory…". Drummond slams the books together, and he walks out with them under his arm.

== Cast ==
- Spencer Tracy as Henry Drummond (patterned after Clarence Darrow)
- Fredric March as Matthew Harrison Brady (patterned after William Jennings Bryan)
- Gene Kelly as E. K. Hornbeck of the Baltimore Herald (patterned after H. L. Mencken)
- Florence Eldridge as Sarah Brady (patterned after Mary Baird Bryan)
- Dick York as Bertram T. Cates (patterned after John Scopes)
- Donna Anderson as Rachel Brown
- Harry Morgan as Judge Merle Coffey (patterned after Judge John T. Raulston)
- Claude Akins as Rev. Jeremiah Brown
- Elliott Reid as Prosecutor Tom Davenport
- Paul Hartman as Deputy Horace Meeker – Bailiff
- Philip Coolidge as Mayor Jason Carter
- Jimmy Boyd as Howard
- Noah Beery Jr. as John Stebbins
- Norman Fell as WGN Radio Technician
- Hope Summers as Mrs. Krebs
- Ray Teal as Jessie H. Dunlap
- Renee Godfrey as Mrs. Stebbins
- Gordon Polk as George Sillers
- Donald Elson as Bollinger

Uncredited roles include Richard Deacon, George Dunn, Snub Pollard, Addison Richards, Harry Tenbrook, Will Wright. Actress and singer Leslie Uggams sings both the opening and closing songs a cappella.

Kramer offered the role of Henry Drummond to Spencer Tracy, who initially turned it down. Kramer then sought March, Kelly, and Eldridge as co-stars, and Tracy eventually agreed to make the film. However, none of the other co-stars had been signed at the time; Tracy was the first. Once Tracy signed on, the others signed too.

== Production ==
=== Background ===
Inherit the Wind is a fictionalized account of the 1925 Scopes "Monkey" Trial, which took place between July 10 and July 21, 1925, and resulted in John T. Scopes's conviction for teaching Darwinism, Charles Darwin's theory of evolution, to a high school science class, contrary to a Tennessee state law. The characters of Matthew Harrison Brady, Henry Drummond, Bertram Cates and E. K. Hornbeck correspond to the historical figures of William Jennings Bryan, Clarence Darrow, Scopes, and H. L. Mencken, respectively. However, Lee and Lawrence state in a note at the opening of the play on which the film is based that it is not meant to be a historical account, and many events were substantially altered or invented. For instance, the characters of the preacher and his daughter were fictional, the townspeople were not hostile towards those who had come to Dayton for the trial, and Bryan offered to pay Scopes' fine if he was convicted. Bryan died shortly after the trial's conclusion. He died in his sleep five days later, on July 26, 1925, at the age of 65.

Political commentator Steve Benen said the following about the drama's inaccuracies: "Scopes issued no plea for empathy, there was no fiancee and the real Scopes was never arrested. In a 1996 interview, Lawrence stated that the play's purpose was to criticize McCarthyism and defend intellectual freedom. According to Lawrence, "we used the teaching of evolution as a parable, a metaphor for any kind of mind control ... It's not about science versus religion. It's about the right to think."

=== Adaptation changes ===
The film includes events from the actual Scopes trial, such as Darrow's citation for contempt of court when he denounced the court by stating that it was prejudiced and his subsequent act of contrition and his request that the charge be dropped. Both events occurred the next day.

=== Historical inaccuracies ===
In the play, Brady is a more extreme Christian fundamentalist than Bryan was. According to historian Ronald Numbers, author of The Creationists, Bryan should be considered a day-age creationist.

Because the judge ruled that scientific evidence was inadmissible, a ruling which the movie depicts, Darrow called Bryan as his only witness and then he attempted to humiliate Bryan by asking him to interpret Scripture. When Darrow, in his closing remarks, called upon the jury to find Scopes guilty so he could appeal the verdict, Bryan was prevented from delivering his summation. The guilty verdict was overturned two years later. Bryan suffered a heart attack and died in his sleep five days after the trial ended.

== Release ==
The film had its world premiere at the 10th Berlin International Film Festival on June 25, 1960. Its U.S. premiere was in Dayton, Tennessee on July 21, 1960.

=== Box office ===
The film grossed $2 million ($20,000,000 in 2022) worldwide and recorded a loss of $1.7 million ($18,500,000 in 2022)

=== Critical reaction ===
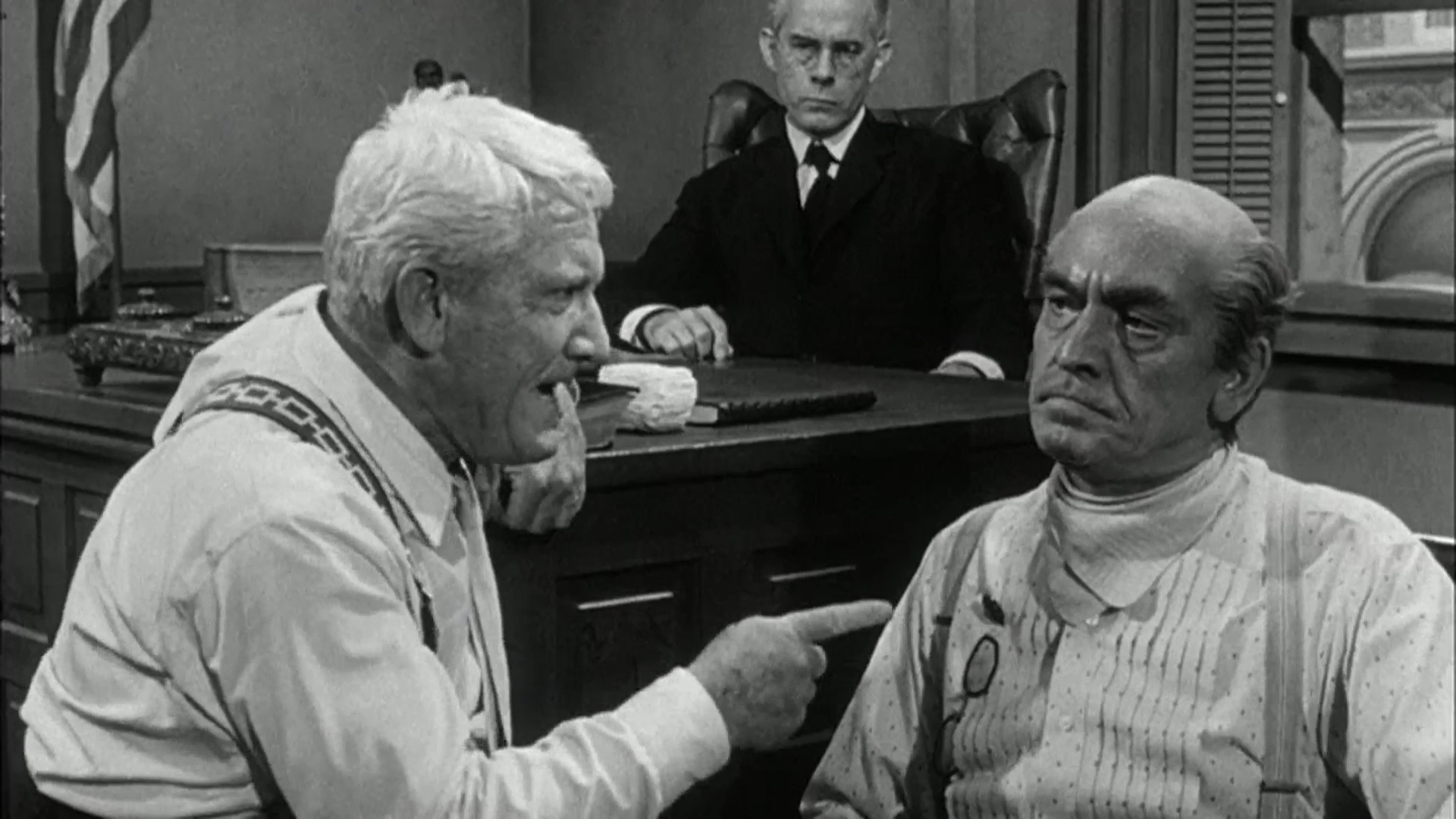
Harry Morgan as the judge, Spencer Tracy as Drummond and Fredric March as Brady

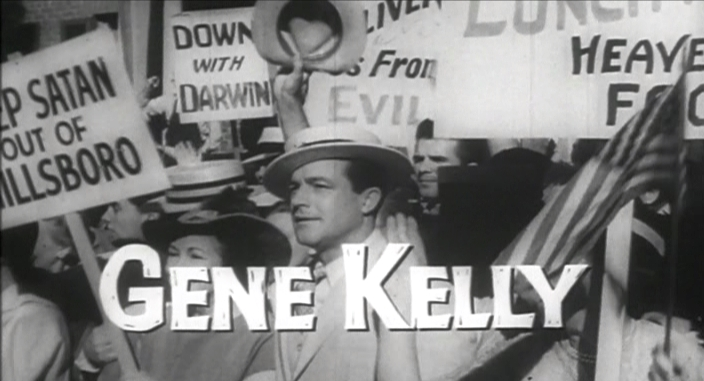
Gene Kelly as Hornbeck

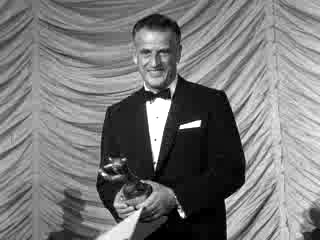
Stanley Kramer receives an award at the 1960 Berlin Film Festival for Inherit the Wind.

Thomas M. Pryor of Variety described it as "a rousing and fascinating motion picture ... roles of Tracy and March equal Clarence Darrow and William Jennings Bryan who collided on evolution ... a good measure of the film's surface bite is contributed by Gene Kelly as a cynical Baltimore reporter (patterned after Henry L. Mencken) whose paper comes to the aid of the younger teacher played by Dick York. Kelly demonstrates again that even without dancing shoes he knows his way on the screen." Bosley Crowther of The New York Times praised the performances of Tracy and March, and further praised Kramer for displaying "not only a graphic fleshing of his theme but he also has got one of the most brilliant and engrossing displays of acting ever witnessed on the screen." Harrison's Reports praised the cast as "superb", but cautioned that "it will be difficult to sell the average movie-goer unless the limited romantic sequences are exaggerated. It is principally a wordy, philosophical courtroom drama, splendidly produced. Direction is top-notch; photography, excellent..."

In 2006, Roger Ebert of the Chicago Sun-Times added it to his "Great Movies" collection, referring to it as "a film that rebukes the past when it might also have feared the future". On the review aggregator website Rotten Tomatoes, the film has a 93% approval rating, based on 27 reviews with an average rating of 8.1/10.

== Awards and nominations ==
Year	Award ceremony	Category	Nominee	Result
1960	Berlin International Film Festival	Golden Bear	Stanley Kramer	Nominated
1960	Berlin International Film Festival	Best Actor	Fredric March	Won
1960	Berlin International Film Festival	Best Feature Film Suitable for Young People	Stanley Kramer	Won
1960	National Board of Review Awards	Top Ten Films	Inherit the Wind	Won
1961	Academy Awards	Best Actor	Spencer Tracy	Nominated
1961	Academy Awards	Best Writing, Screenplay Based on Material from Another Medium	Nedrick Young, Harold Jacob Smith	Nominated
1961	Academy Awards	Best Cinematography, Black-and-White	Ernest Laszlo	Nominated
1961	Academy Awards	Best Film Editing	Frederic Knudtson	Nominated
1961	BAFTA	Best Film from Any Source	Stanley Kramer	Nominated
1961	BAFTA	Best Foreign Actor	Fredric March	Nominated
1961	BAFTA	Best Foreign Actor	Spencer Tracy	Nominated
1961	Golden Globes	Best Motion Picture – Drama	Stanley Kramer	Nominated
1961	Golden Globes	Best Actor – Motion Picture Drama	Spencer Tracy	Nominated

== See also ==
- List of American films of 1960
- Trial movies
