= 11th Directors Guild of America Awards =

- Date: 1959
- Country: United States
- Presented by: Directors Guild of America

Highlights
- Best Director Feature Film: Gigi – Vincente Minnelli
- Best Director Television: 77 Sunset Strip for "All Our Yesterdays" – Richard L. Bare
- Website: https://www.dga.org/Awards/History/1950s/1958.aspx?value=1958

The 11th Directors Guild of America Awards, honoring the outstanding directorial achievements in film and television in 1958, were presented in 1959.

== Winners and nominees ==
=== Film ===
Feature Film

Vincente Minnelli – Gigi

- George Abbott and Stanley Donen – Damn Yankees
- Richard Brooks – The Brothers Karamazov
- Delmer Daves – Cowboy
- Edward Dmytryk – The Young Lions
- Richard Fleischer – The Vikings
- Alfred Hitchcock – Vertigo
- Stanley Kramer – The Defiant Ones
- Martin Ritt – The Long, Hot Summer
- Mark Robson – The Inn of the Sixth Happiness
- George Seaton – Teacher's Pet
- Robert Wise – I Want to Live!
- William Wyler – The Big Country

=== Television ===
Television

Richard L. Bare – 77 Sunset Strip for "All Our Yesterdays"

=== D.W. Griffith Award ===
- Frank Capra

=== Honorary Life Member ===
- George Sidney
