= Harold Jacob Smith =

American screenwriter

- Born: July 2, 1912; New York City, United States
- Died: December 28, 1970 (aged 58); Los Angeles, California, United States
- Occupations: Writer, screenwriter
- Years active: 1957–1970

Harold Jacob Smith (July 2, 1912 – December 28, 1970) was an American screenwriter. His screenplay for The Defiant Ones won the Academy Award for Best Original Screenplay in 1958.

== Filmography ==
=== Films ===
- Swiss Family Robinson: Lost in the Jungle (2000)
- Inherit the Wind (1999)
- The Defiant Ones (1986)
- The McMasters (1970)
- Inherit the Wind (1960)
- Enchanted Island (1958)
- The Defiant Ones (1958)
- The River's Edge (1957)
- It Came from Beneath the Sea (1955)
- Customs Agent (1950)
- Black Eagle (1948)
- Thunderhoof (1948)
- Dangerous Business (1946)
- Night Editor (1946)
- Music in Manhattan (1944)
- She's a Soldier Too (1944)
- Good Luck, Mr. Yates (1943)

=== TV ===
- Celebrity Playhouse (1955)
- The Unexpected (1952)
- Stars Over Hollywood (1951)
