= Nedrick Young =

American actor and screenwriter (1914–1968)

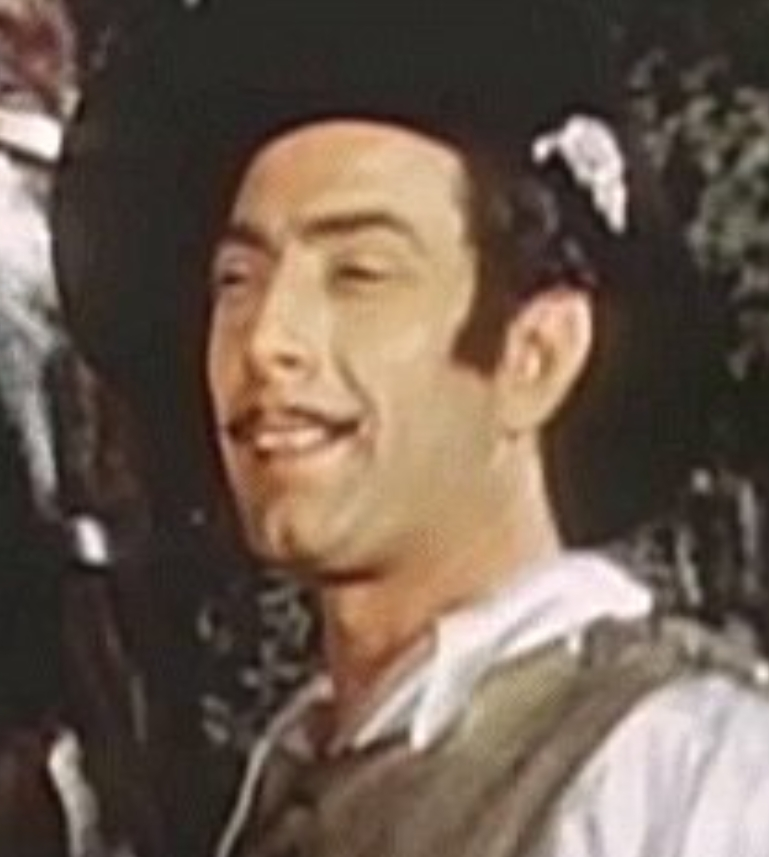
- Young in Captain Scarlett (1953)
- Born: March 23, 1914; Philadelphia, Pennsylvania, U.S.
- Died: September 16, 1968 (aged 54); Los Angeles, California, U.S.
- Other names: Nathan E. Douglas
- Occupations: Actor; screenwriter
- Years active: 1943–1968
- Spouse(s): Frances Sage (m. 19??; died 1963) Elizabeth MacRae (m. 1965)
- Awards: Academy Award - Best Story and Screenplay Written Directly for the Screen; 1958 The Defiant Ones

Nedrick Young (March 23, 1914 – September 16, 1968), also known by the pseudonym Nathan E. Douglas, was an American actor and screenwriter often blacklisted during the 1950s and 1960s for refusing to confirm or deny membership of the Communist Party before the House Committee on Un-American Activities (HCUA). He is credited with writing the story for Jailhouse Rock in 1957, which starred Elvis Presley.

Young was born in Philadelphia. In addition to screenwriting, he took acting roles in various feature-length films from 1943 to 1966.

== Recognition ==
The Defiant Ones received an Oscar for the "best screenplay written directly for the screen" in 1958. For the same film, Young and co-writer Harold Jacob Smith won a 1959 Edgar Award for Best Motion Picture Screenplay, from the Mystery Writers of America. Inherit the Wind was also nominated for, but did not win, an Academy Award in 1960. The same year, he and others brought a lawsuit against the Motion Picture Association (MPAA) for 13 years of blacklisting. The suit was not successful.

== Filmography ==
Actor

- 1943: Bombs Over Burma - Slim Jenkins
- 1943: Dead Men Walk - Dr. David Bentley
- 1943: Ladies' Day - Tony D'Angelo
- 1946: Gay Blades - Gary Lester
- 1946: The Devil's Playground - Curly Evans
- 1947: Unexpected Guest - Ralph Baxter
- 1948: The Swordsman - Bruce Glowan
- 1948: The Gallant Blade - Sergeant Martine
- 1949: Calamity Jane and Sam Bass - Parsons (uncredited)
- 1949: Border Incident - Happy (uncredited)
- 1950: Gun Crazy - Dave Allister
- 1950: Love That Brute - Rocky (uncredited)
- 1950: A Lady Without Passport - Harry Nordell
- 1951: Inside Straight - Accountant (uncredited)
- 1952: Retreat, Hell! - Sgt. Novak (credited: Ned Young)
- 1952: Aladdin and His Lamp - Hassan
- 1952: Springfield Rifle - Sgt. Poole (uncredited)
- 1952: The Iron Mistress - Henri Contrecourt
- 1953: She's Back on Broadway - Rafferty
- 1953: Captain Scarlett - Pierre DuCloux
- 1953: House of Wax - Leon Averill (uncredited)
- 1953: So This Is Love - Harry Corbett (uncredited)
- 1953: Crime Wave - Gat Morgan
- 1953: The Eddie Cantor Story - Jack (uncredited)
- 1958: The Defiant Ones - Prison Guard in Truck (uncredited)
- 1958: Terror in a Texas Town - John Crale
- 1966: Seconds - Henry Bushman

Screenplay

- 1957: Jailhouse Rock
- 1958: The Defiant Ones
- 1960: Inherit the Wind
- 1968: Shadow on the Land

== Personal life ==
He was married to actress Elizabeth MacRae. After several years of heart trouble, Young died suddenly of a heart attack.
