= Me and the Colonel =

1958 film by Peter Glenville

- Theatrical release poster
- Directed by: Peter Glenville
- Screenplay by: S. N. Behrman; George Froeschel
- Based on: Jacobowsky und der Oberst by Franz Werfel
- Produced by: William Goetz
- Starring: Danny Kaye; Curt Jurgens; Nicole Maurey; Françoise Rosay; Akim Tamiroff; Martita Hunt; Alexander Scourby
- Cinematography: Burnett Guffey
- Edited by: William A. Lyon; Charles Nelson
- Music by: George Duning
- Distributed by: Columbia Pictures
- Release date: October 1958 (United States)
- Running time: 110 minutes
- Country: United States
- Language: English
- Box office: $1.2 million (US and Canada rentals)

Me and the Colonel is a 1958 American comedy film based on the play Jacobowsky und der Oberst by Franz Werfel. It was directed by Peter Glenville and stars Danny Kaye, Curd Jürgens, and Nicole Maurey.

Kaye won a Golden Globe Award for Best Actor in a Motion Picture – Musical or Comedy for his portrayal. The writers won a Writers Guild of America Award for Best Written Comedy.

== Plot ==
In Paris during the World War II invasion of France by Nazi Germany, Jewish refugee S. L. Jacobowsky seeks to leave the country before it falls. Meanwhile, Polish diplomat Dr. Szicki gives the antisemitic and autocratic Polish Colonel Prokoszny secret information that must be delivered to London by a certain date.

The resourceful Jacobowsky, who has had to flee from the Nazis several times previously, manages to "buy" an automobile from the absent Baron Rothschild's chauffeur. Prokoszny peremptorily requisitions the car, but finds he must accept an unwelcome passenger when he discovers that Jacobowsky has had the foresight to secure gasoline. The ill-matched pair (coincidentally from the same village in Poland) and the colonel's orderly, Szabuniewicz, drive away.

Jacobowsky is dismayed when the colonel first heads to Reims in the direction of the advancing German army to pick up his girlfriend, Suzanne Roualet, a French innkeeper's daughter. Prior to their arrival, Suzanne attracts the unwanted admiration of German Major von Bergen, but he is called away before he can become better acquainted with her.

As they flee south, Jacobowsky begins to fall in love with Suzanne. At one stop, Jacobowsky manages to find the group magnificent lodgings at a chateau by telling its proud royalist owner that unoccupied France is to become a monarchy headed by the colonel. A drunk Prokoszny challenges Jacobowsky to a duel, but Jacobowsky manages to defuse the situation. When the Germans, under von Bergen, occupy the chateau, the foursome barely get away.

They are chased by von Bergen, but the assistance of a sympathetic Mother Superior enables them to shake off their pursuers and reach a prearranged rendezvous with a British submarine. There, however, the submarine's commander informs them that there is only room for two. Suzanne makes the colonel and Jacobowsky go, while she and Szabuniewicz (whom Prokoszhy promoted to sergeant just before leaving) remain behind to fight the invaders in their own way.

In a final twist, just after boarding the submarine, Prokoszhy realizes in a panic that he does not have the secret documents. Jacobowsky then produces theum from his scarf, where he had hidden them some time before. Prokoszhy mellows at this and says, "More and more I like this Jacobowsky."

== Cast ==
- Danny Kaye as S.L. Jacobowsky
- Curd Jürgens as Colonel Prokoszny (as Curt Jurgens)
- Nicole Maurey as Suzanne Roualet
- Françoise Rosay as Madame Bouffier (as Francoise Rosay)
- Akim Tamiroff as Szabuniewicz
- Martita Hunt as Mother Superior
- Alexander Scourby as Major von Bergen
- Liliane Montevecchi as Cosette
- Ludwig Stössel as Dr. Szicki (as Ludwig Stossel)
- Gérard Buhr as German Captain (as Gerard Buhr)
- Franz Roehn as Monsieur Girardin
- Celia Lovsky as Mme. Arle
- Clément Harari as Man of the Gestapo (as Clement Harari)
- Alain Bouvette as Rothschild's Chauffeur
- Albert Godderis as M. Gravat
- Peter Glenville as Submarine Captain (uncredited)

== Production ==
The film was William Goetz's first film in a six-picture deal for Columbia.

== Reception ==
The film was well reviewed but did not do well at the box office. Herbert Feinstein in Film Quarterly, wrote that "Willam Goetz ... produces the minor miracle of creating a credible modern-day fairy tale." He lauded all of the main actors, but singled out Kaye for even higher praise, stating, "The director (Peter Glenville) doubtless is a genius, for he has taken this batch of variously outrageous personalities and muted them into a team: in the case of Kaye, the alchemy achieves pure gold."
