= Fay Kanin =

American screenwriter (1917-2013)

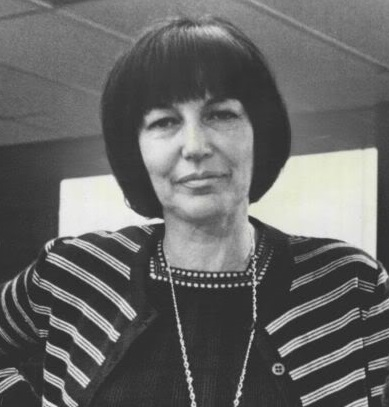
- Kanin in 1974
- Born: Fay Mitchell; May 9, 1917; New York City, U.S.
- Died: March 27, 2013 (aged 95); Santa Monica, California, U.S.
- Education: Elmira College
- Occupations: Screenwriter; producer
- Spouse: Michael Kanin (m. 1940; died 1993)
- Children: 2

Fay Kanin (née Mitchell; May 9, 1917 – March 27, 2013) was an American screenwriter, playwright and producer. Kanin was president of the Academy of Motion Picture Arts and Sciences from 1979 to 1983.

== Biography ==
Born Fay Mitchell in New York City to David and Bessie (née Kaiser) Mitchell, she was raised in Elmira, New York, where she won the New York State Spelling Championship at twelve and was presented with a silver cup by then Governor Franklin Roosevelt. She was encouraged to write for money by supplying small items to the Elmira Star Gazette. She was Jewish.

In high school she wrote and produced a children's radio show; then on full scholarship, she attended the private, all-female Elmira College where she divided her studies between writing and acting as well as editing the yearbook. Fay's mother took her daughter to visit her grandmother in the Bronx, and it was there that she became devoted to the theater when she saw a matinée of Idiot's Delight starring Alfred Lunt and Lynn Fontanne.

=== Hollywood ===
Kanin longed to move to Los Angeles to get into pictures and her parents indulged her. Her father moved to California first to secure a job, then she and her mother packed everything and followed by train. Kanin spent her senior year at the University of Southern California where she became active in college radio. After graduating with a bachelor's degree, she wangled an interview with Sam Marx who thought she was much too young to hire; but her next interview was with story editor Bob Sparks at RKO who sent her to producer Al Lewis, who then hired her as a story editor at $75 a week. RKO released Lewis, but Sparks kept Fay on as scriptreader to write one-page summaries for $25 a week. Kanin proceeded to teach herself everything she could about the movie industry at RKO's expense. During the lunch hour, she talked to anyone she happened to find – whether they were art directors, editors, or cinematographers.

=== Michael Kanin ===
There was a small theater at the studio where contract players put on plays. While Kanin was acting in Irwin Shaw's Bury the Dead, she came to the attention of Michael Kanin, who had just been hired as a writer in the B unit. Michael was trained as an artist and had turned to commercial art and painting scenery for burlesque houses to help support his parents during the Great Depression. They were introduced by a mutual friend, and Michael practically asked Kanin to marry him right then and there, but it took her a little while to come around to the idea.

The Kanins rented a house in Malibu for their honeymoon, and after buying The New Yorker short story by A. J. Liebling about a boarding house for boxers, spent the next six months writing its 1942 adaptation, Sunday Punch. They knew they were on the track to a partnership when MGM bought the screenplay.

"We would make a story outline together with rather detailed descriptions of the scenes. Then we divided up the writing, each taking the scenes we felt strongly about. Then one or the other of us would put it all together into a single draft. We did find a common voice, though we had different strengths. As an artist, Michael brought a great visual sense to the process. I was a people person who loved the characters and the dialogue. Through the collaboration, we learned a lot from each other and about each other. But the time came when I felt as if we were together 48 hours a day. Writing with someone else always requires some degree of compromise, as does marriage. When it came down to the question of which would survive, the marriage or the writing partnership, it was a pretty easy decision. But I remember that it was a challenge convincing the powers that be that we had been successful writers individually and would be again. We were hyphenated in people's minds: Fay-and-Michael Kanin. To again become Fay Kanin and Michael Kanin took some doing."

Michael took a job working with Ring Lardner Jr. to work on the Tracy / Hepburn project Woman of the Year (1942), based on an original story by his brother Garson Kanin. Fay Kanin wrote the play, Goodbye, My Fancy, (originally titled Most Likely to Succeed) which was produced on Broadway by Michael. The play told the story of a female congressional representative renewing past loves. Countering existing gender roles, the play made a bold statement about women and their place outside the home. The play was a Broadway smash and starred Madeleine Carroll, Conrad Nagel, and Shirley Booth, and was eventually filmed by Vincent Sherman in 1951 with Joan Crawford and Robert Young.

During World War II, Kanin came up with an idea to promote women's participation in the war effort, and presented the idea for A Woman's Angle radio show to the heads of NBC Radio for which Kanin would write the scripts and do the network commentary. Along those lines, she contributed to the story Blondie for Victory, one of the low-budget series based on the popular comic strip, where Blondie organizes Housewives of America to perform homefront wartime duties much to the dismay of Dagwood. Kanin even made an acting appearance in A Double Life (1947), co-written by her brother-in-law Garson Kanin and his wife, actress Ruth Gordon.

=== Teacher's Pet ===
The Kanins wrote My Pal Gus (1952) in which Richard Widmark becomes a good father and falls in love with Joanne Dru, the Elizabeth Taylor film Rhapsody (1954) and The Opposite Sex (1956), a musical remake of The Women. But it was the Oscar-nominated script for Teacher's Pet (1958) for which they are best remembered, a film about a self-made newspaper editor Clark Gable who has a love-hate relationship with journalism teacher Doris Day. The film almost did not get made since the Kanins were not under any studio contract, and having shopped the script around without attracting any interest, it was only after a rewrite inspired by Garson Kanin's Born Yesterday that producer Bill Perlberg and director George Seaton purchased it.

=== Blacklist ===
It was while the couple were on holiday in Europe that the Kanins learned they had been blacklisted by the HUAC.

"What they had against us was that I had taken classes at the Actors Lab in Hollywood where some of the teachers were from the Group Theater and therefore suspect, and we had been members of the Hollywood Writers Mobilization, an organization in support of World War II to which almost all of Hollywood's writers belonged. It was ridiculous, but it was very real, and there was nothing we could do about it. We took a larger mortgage on the house and started writing a play, but we didn't work in films for almost two years."

They were unable to find work again until director Charles Vidor insisted that MGM hire the couple for Rhapsody in 1953.

=== Rashomon ===
In 1959 the couple adapted Akira Kurosawa's Rashomon for the Broadway play of the same name; with a further adaptation for the screen, in Martin Ritts The Outrage.

=== Television ===
In the early 1970s, Kanin began solo writing in earnest with Heat of Anger, about a strong, older woman lawyer played by Susan Hayward and a younger male lawyer. At first, Kanin was put off by the lack of an immediate reaction from an audience, but once she realized that more people had seen it in one night than would have seen it in theaters if it played for a year, she was hooked and wrote five more films for television.

Tell Me Where it Hurts started from a small newspaper article about a group of women in Queens who got together to just talk. The film starred Maureen Stapleton and won two Emmys. The following year, she wrote and co-produced Hustling based on Gail Sheehy's non-fiction book. The film was about a prostitute recounting her life to a reporter, and starred Jill Clayburgh and Lee Remick, respectively. For weeks, Kanin interviewed working girls at the Midtown North police station, and after the film aired, she received letters complimenting her on how fairly she had treated them.

The television movie Friendly Fire was seen by an estimated 60 million people in 1979. Written and co-produced by Kanin, it starred Carol Burnett as a mother who challenges the military's "official story" of how her son died in Vietnam. The non-fiction book by C. D. B. Bryan was about the Mullen family and their discovery that their son had been accidentally killed by American troops. Kanin spent five months secluded with Bryan's research tapes adapting the book, and Friendly Fire won the Primetime Emmy Award for Outstanding Drama or Comedy Special that year.

In 1978, Kanin and Lillian Gallo, the producer of Hustling, partnered to form a joint production company, becoming one of the early female production teams in Hollywood. Their company produced Fun and Games for Valerie Harper, a tale of sexual harassment and gender discrimination in the workplace. For Norman Lear, Kanin wrote Heartsounds, which starred Mary Tyler Moore and James Garner as a couple coping with heart disease.

=== Grind ===
In 1975, Universal Studio producers asked Kanin for a screenplay about a bi-racial burlesque theater in 1933 Chicago. Nothing came of it, but in 1985 Kanin adapted her unproduced screenplay for the stage. The result was Grind. Directed by Hal Prince with choreography by Lester Wilson, the cast included Ben Vereen as a song-and-dance man, Stubby Kaye as a slapstick comic, and Leilani Jones as a stripper named Satin. The production was a disaster; the show lost its entire $4.75 million investment, and Prince and three other members of the creative team were suspended by the Dramatists Guild of America for signing a "substandard" contract.

=== Academy of Motion Picture Arts and Sciences ===
Kanin was elected president of the Academy of Motion Picture Arts and Sciences in 1979, and served four terms until 1983. She was its second female president, following in the footsteps of earlier president Bette Davis, who left after only one month. She has also served as the president of the Screen Branch of the Writers Guild of America and as Chair of the National Film Preservation Board of the Library of Congress, an officer of the Writers Guild Foundation, a member of the Board of the Academy of Motion Picture Arts and Sciences, and a member of the board of directors of the American Film Institute.

Fay Kanin was the vice president of the Academy's 1999–2000 Board of Trustees, and a member of the steering committee of the Caucus for Producers, Writers and Directors, which formed in 1974, and of the National Film Preservation Board in Washington, D.C. She served on the Academy of Motion Picture Arts and Sciences Board of Governors from 2007–08.

=== National Student Film Institute ===
During the 1980s and 1990s Kanin served on the advisory board of the National Student Film Institute.

== Filmography ==
- Sunday Punch (1942, screenplay, story)
- Blondie for Victory (1942, story)
- Goodbye, My Fancy (1951, based on her 1948 play)
- My Pal Gus (1952, original screenplay)
- Rhapsody (1954, screenplay)
- The Opposite Sex (1956, screenplay)
- Teacher's Pet (1958, screenplay)
- Rashomon (1959, adaptation)
- The Right Approach (1961, screenplay)
- Play of the Week: Rashomon (1961, teleplay adaptation)
- Congiura dei dieci, La (1962, screenplay)
- The Outrage (1964, adaptation)
- Heat of Anger (1972, teleplay)
- Tell Me Where It Hurts (1974, teleplay)
- Hustling (1975, teleplay, associate producer)
- Friendly Fire (1979, teleplay, co-producer)
- Fun and Games (1980, TV producer)
- Heartsounds (1984, teleplay, producer)

== Stage productions ==
- Goodbye, My Fancy (1948)
- His and Hers (1954) with Michael Kanin
- Rashomon (1959) with Michael Kanin
- The Gay Life (1961) with Michael Kanin (later retitled as The High Life)
- Grind (1985)

== Awards and nominations ==
Year	Award	Category	Nominated work	Result	Ref.
1958	Academy Awards	Best Story and Screenplay – Written Directly for the Screen	Teacher's Pet	Nominated	
1992	American Society of Cinematographers Awards	Board of the Governors Award		Won	
1975	Edgar Allan Poe Awards	Best Television Feature or Miniseries	Hustling	Nominated	
1979	Humanitas Prize	90 Minute or Longer Network or Syndicated Television	Friendly Fire	Nominated	
2003	Humanitas Prize	Kieser Award		Won	
1974	Primetime Emmy Awards	Best Writing in Drama – Original Teleplay	Tell Me Where It Hurts	Won	
1974	Primetime Emmy Awards	Writer of the Year – Special	Tell Me Where It Hurts	Won	
1975	Primetime Emmy Awards	Outstanding Writing in a Special Program – Drama or Comedy – Original Teleplay	Hustling	Nominated	
1979	Primetime Emmy Awards	Outstanding Drama or Comedy Special	Friendly Fire	Won	
1979	Primetime Emmy Awards	Outstanding Writing in a Limited Series or a Special	Friendly Fire	Nominated	
1985	Primetime Emmy Awards	Outstanding Drama/Comedy Special	Heartsounds	Nominated	
1998	Producers Guild of America Awards	Hall of Fame – Television Programs	Friendly Fire	Won	
1985	Tony Awards	Best Book of a Musical	Grind	Nominated	
1980	Women in Film Crystal + Lucy Awards	Crystal Award		Won	
1958	Writers Guild of America Awards	Best Written American Comedy	Teacher's Pet	Nominated	
1975	Writers Guild of America Awards	Valentine Davies Award		Won	
1980	Writers Guild of America Awards	Morgan Cox Award		Won	
2005	Writers Guild of America Awards	Edmund H. North Award		Won	

Non-profit organization positions
Preceded by Howard W. Koch	President of Academy of Motion Pictures, Arts and Sciences; 1979-1983	Succeeded by Gene Allen
