= The Right Approach =

1961 film by David Butler

- Directed by: David Butler
- Screenplay by: Fay Kanin; Michael Kanin
- Based on: The Live Wire; 1950 play by Garson Kanin
- Produced by: Oscar Brodney
- Starring: Frankie Vaughan; Juliet Prowse; Martha Hyer
- Cinematography: Sam Leavitt
- Edited by: Tom McAdoo
- Music by: Dominic Frontiere
- Production company: 20th Century Fox
- Distributed by: 20th Century Fox
- Release date: May 17, 1961
- Running time: 92 minutes
- Country: United States
- Language: English
- Budget: $920,000

The Right Approach is a 1961 CinemaScope drama film directed by David Butler and starring Juliet Prowse, Frankie Vaughan (in his final film role) and Martha Hyer.

It was known as The Live Wire.

== Plot ==
Army buddies return home to Pasadena, California, and convert a restaurant known as The Hut into a five-man bachelor pad.

One of them has a brother, Leo Mack, who will stop at nothing in his desire to succeed as an actor. Leo cons the guys out of clothes and money. He also conspires with a carhop, Ursula, who hopes to seduce one of the roommates. The young man happens to be from a wealthy family, so Ursula and Leo intend to split whatever they can get.

A magazine writer, Anne Perry, is romanced by Leo and persuaded to do an article about The Hut, which is mainly about him. Leo gets an agent and Hollywood offers, and seems on top of the world until a scorned Anne exposes him publicly for the cad he is, as does Ursula, who is pregnant with his child.

== Cast ==
- Frankie Vaughan as Leo Mack
- Martha Hyer as Anne Perry
- Juliet Prowse as Ursula Poe
- Gary Crosby as Rip Hullet
- David McLean as Bill Sukolovic
- Jesse White as Brian Freer
- Jane Withers as Liz Fargo, Life Magazine photographer
- Rachel Stephens as Helen
- Steve Harris as Mitch Mack
- Paul von Schreiber as Granny
- Robert Casper as Horace Wetheridge Tobey III

== Production ==
The film was based on Garson Kanin's play The Live Wire which debuted on Broadway in August 1950.

Film rights were bought by 20th Century Fox who originally announced it as a vehicle for Elvis Presley once the latter got out of the army.

The film was announced by Fox executive Bob Goldstein in September 1960. It was turned into a star vehicle for Frankie Vaughan who had just made Let's Make Love for Fox.

The title was changed to No Right to Love.

Variety later called the film "throwaway fare" and an example of "the kind of indiscriminate production" that Fox put out in 1960-61.
