= Valentine Davies Award =

Writers Guild of America, West award

The Valentine Davies Award, named after Valentine Davies, is a special award given to a member of the Writers Guild of America, West whose contributions to the entertainment industry and the community-at-large have brought dignity and honor to writers everywhere.

== Recipients ==
Year	Person(s)	Reference
1962	Mary C. McCall Jr.	
1963	Allen Rivkin	
1964	Morgan Cox	
1965	James R. Webb	
1966	Leonard Spigelgass	
1967	Edmund H. North	
1968	George Seaton	
1969	Dore Schary	
1970	Richard Murphy	
1971	Dan Taradash	
1972	Michael Blankfort & Norman Corwin	
1973	William Ludwig	
1974	Ray Bradbury & Philip Dunne	
1975	Fay Kanin	
1976	Winston Miller	
1977	Carl Foreman	
1978	Norman Lear	
1979	Melville Shavelson	
1980	David W. Rintels	
1981	Arthur Orloff	
1982	Mort R. Lewis	
1983	Hal Kanter	
1984	Jerome Lawrence & Robert E. Lee	
1985	Charles Champlin	
1986	Ronald Austin	
1987	William Froug	
1988	Lois Peyser	
1989	Michael Kanin & Garson Kanin	
1990	John Furia Jr.	
1991	Frank Pierson	
1992	Allan Burns	
1993	True Boardman	
1994	Phil Alden Robinson	
1995	Garry Marshall	
1996	Mike Farrell	
1997	Jonathan Estrin & Shelley List (posthumously)	
1998	Gary David Goldberg	
1999	Barry Kemp	
2000	Alan Alda	
2001	Paul Haggis	
2002	David Angell (posthumously)	
2003	Aaron Ruben	
2004	Neal Baer	
2005	Irma Kalish	
2006	Not presented	
2007	Larry Gelbart	
2008	Tom Schulman	
2009	Carl Reiner & Victoria Riskin	
2010	Not presented	
2011	Seth Freeman & Susannah Grant	
2012	Philip Rosenthal	
2013	Sam Simon	
2014	Ben Affleck	
2016	John August	
2017	Richard Curtis	
2018	Dustin Lance Black	
2020	Brad Falchuk	
