= Goodbye My Fancy =

Goodbye My Fancy may refer to:

- "Good-Bye My Fancy!", 1891 American poem in second annex to Walt Whitman's Leaves of Grass
- Goodbye, My Fancy, 1948 American comedy play by Fay Kanin
- Goodbye, My Fancy (film), 1951 American romantic comedy based on Kanin's play
