= The Magnificent Dope =

1942 film by Walter Lang

- Directed by: Walter Lang
- Screenplay by: George Seaton
- Story by: Joseph Schrank
- Produced by: William Perlberg
- Starring: Henry Fonda; Lynn Bari; Don Ameche
- Cinematography: J. Peverell Marley
- Edited by: Barbara McLean
- Music by: Emil Newman; Leigh Harline; Cyril J. Mockridge; David Raksin
- Production company: 20th Century Fox
- Distributed by: 20th Century-Fox
- Release date: July 1, 1942
- Running time: 83-84 minutes
- Country: United States
- Language: English

The Magnificent Dope is a 1942 American comedy film released by 20th Century Fox. It is also known as Lazy Galahad, Strictly Dynamite and The Magnificent Jerk.

== Plot ==
Dwight Dawson runs a hype-driven self-improvement course in the Dale Carnegie mode. He and his partner Horace Hunter are seeking new sales ideas as enrollment has declined sharply. Their chief of marketing, Claire Harris, who is also Dwight's fiancée, comes up with an idea to announce a contest seeking the biggest loser in the country. The prize is $500 and Dwight's course in career advancement. The idea is that the contest will create interest to Dwight's teaching system.

A winner is chosen: Thadeus Winship Page from the small town of Upper White Eddy in Vermont. He is running a not overly successful business of renting out boats during summer time and is, by his own description, lazy and completely unmotivated.

Tad comes to New York City to collect his prize, determined to use the money toward a fire engine needed by the small town. The publicity stunt is jeopardized, though, when happy, contented Tad does not want to take the course. Tad is charmed by Claire during a night out in the city and falls in love with her, all the while expounding his own philosophies on relaxation, enjoying life, and the unimportance of money. After the night out, Tad reluctantly agrees to take the course, just to be close to Claire.

Claire comes to realizes that he is not the failure they had thought him to be. After a while, Tad shyly admits to Claire that he is in love, but he doesn't dare tell her she is the subject of his affection, inventing a girl from his hometown named "Hazel".

When Dwight hears about this, he tells Tad that the business course will help him in his quest to win his girl. Tad believes Dwight and continues the course until he hears that Claire is in love with someone else. Dwight and Horace have to persuade him once again to stay, telling Tad that the man Claire is in love with is an ugly, fat, and stupid man who can be out-conquered, carefully concealing his own engagement to Claire.

The publicity makes the course a success and attendance becomes much higher. Dwight convinces Tad to get a job to prove his success to the various magazines covering the course progress, so he does. He is hired as an insurance salesman, but is soon discouraged when he is unsuccessful. Dwight secretly helps out by making his friend buy an insurance policy from Tad, unaware that his friend, Frank Mitchell, has high blood pressure and would not pass the required physical. Tad commits his anticipated commission to the purchase of the fire engine, and takes Claire to see it. They bond further over Claire's passion for fire engines; she was a fire chief's niece.

When Tad finally reveals to Claire that she is his "Hazel", she reveals her engagement to Dwight. Heartbroken and humiliated, Tad feels he has been played for a fool by the couple.

The next day, after dodging Claire's many phone calls, Tad uses a special relaxation technique on Frank to help him pass the necessary physical, then proceeds to Dwight's office to vent his anger. Instead, he joins the rest of the office in overhearing a furious Claire in Dwight's office scolding him for the ruse and confessing her love for Tad. When Claire exits the building she finds Tad waiting in the new fire engine. With the siren blaring, they drive off to Vermont together as a couple. Dwight moves on to teach relaxation, using the technique Tad showed him.

== Cast ==
- Henry Fonda as Thadeus Winship "Tad" Page
- Lynn Bari as Claire Harris
- Don Ameche as Dwight Dawson
- Edward Everett Horton as Horace Hunter
- George Barbier as James Roger Barker
- Frank Orth as Messenger
- Roseanne Murray as Dawson's Secretary
- Marietta Canty as Jennie
- Hobart Cavanaugh as Albert Gowdy
- Hal K. Dawson as Charlie
- Josephine Whittell as Mrs. Hunter
- Arthur Loft as Mr. Morton, Fire Engine Salesman
- Paul Stanton as Peters
- Claire Du Brey as Peter's Secretary
- William B. Davidson as Mr. J. D. Reindel
- Harry Hayden as Frank Mitchel
- Pierre Watkin as Bill Carson
