= Apartment for Peggy =

1948 comedy film directed by George Seaton starring William Holden

- Directed by: George Seaton
- Screenplay by: George Seaton
- Story by: Faith Baldwin
- Based on: An Apartment for Jenny; 1947 novelette by Faith Baldwin
- Produced by: William Perlberg
- Starring: Jeanne Crain; William Holden; Edmund Gwenn; Gene Lockhart; Griff Barnett; Randy Stuart
- Cinematography: Harry Jackson
- Edited by: Robert L. Simpson
- Music by: David Raksin
- Distributed by: Twentieth Century-Fox
- Release date: October 15, 1948
- Running time: 96 minutes
- Country: United States
- Language: English
- Budget: $2 million
- Box office: $2,750,000 (US rentals)

Apartment for Peggy is a 1948 American comedy-drama film directed by George Seaton and starring Jeanne Crain, William Holden, and Edmund Gwenn. The plot is about a depressed professor whose spirits are lifted when he rents part of his home to a young couple. It was based on the novelette An Apartment for Jenny by Faith Baldwin. Campus exteriors were filmed at the University of Nevada, Reno.

== Plot ==
Just after World War II, retired philosophy professor Henry Barnes (Gwenn) confides in his friend, law professor Edward Bell (Lockhart), that he is planning to commit suicide. He has reached this decision calmly and logically, feeling that having been forced to retire by the college, he is no longer useful, and he should not stay alive and use up the world's scarce resources. It is later revealed to the viewer that Henry's wife has died and his son was killed in the war. Edward tries to talk Henry out of his plan and contacts Dr. Philip Conway, who examines Henry and finds him in very good health. Henry asks the doctor to prescribe him sleeping pills, but Dr. Philip will only give him two at a time to prevent Henry from committing suicide by overdose.

Jason Taylor (Holden) is a United States Navy veteran who survived the sinking of the USS Vincennes and is now attending college on the G.I. Bill, hoping to become a chemistry teacher. He and his young, pregnant wife Peggy (Crain) live in a cramped camper while she seeks a better apartment for them, where Jason can concentrate on his studies without anxiety. The post-World War II housing shortage is affecting many G.I. Bill students who have brought wives and families with them; quonset huts have been set up in every spare space, and Edward, who is also serving as VA housing administrator, is swamped with paperwork and requests.

Peggy and Henry randomly meet on a campus bench and Henry is fascinated by her youthful slang and enthusiasm. She tells him all about Jason and their housing dilemma. When she complains about the unresponsive "creep" housing administrator, Edward, Henry reveals that Edward is his good friend. Peggy then goes to Edward's office to pressure him. Edward discovers that Henry has a spare attic and assigns Peggy and Jason to live with Henry.

The young couple move in and disrupt the usual peace and quiet of Henry's home. At first Henry is upset by the noise and chaos, but they all work through the tensions and end up making an impromptu family. Jason and Peggy help with the house chores and Peggy starts calling Henry "Pop". Peggy also finds new work for Henry, having him teach a free class for the G.I. Bill students' wives, who are worried about being left behind by their newly educated husbands. However, Henry is still planning to commit suicide on March 1, saving up the pills he gets two at a time from the doctor. Meanwhile, Jason, who is having trouble in his chemistry class and is worried about money, is considering quitting school to take a job selling used cars in Chicago. Peggy then suddenly has a miscarriage, saddening them all. Henry tells Peggy that he had planned to commit suicide, but has changed his mind.

Jason quits school and moves to Chicago to sell cars, leaving a depressed Peggy behind to recover at Henry's house. Dr. Conway tells Henry that Peggy's illness is not health-related but rather stems from her disappointment that Jason gave up his dream. Henry contacts Jason and tries to talk him into returning to school. Henry thinks his efforts have failed, but unbeknownst to Henry and Peggy, Jason secretly returns to try to pass his exams. He does well on them all, except his most difficult subject, chemistry. Halfway through the exam, he almost gives up in frustration, but is talked out of it by his chemistry professor, who turns out to also be a Navy veteran. With the professor's encouragement, Jason passes the chemistry exam.

Meanwhile, Henry, having told Peggy that his home is her home, has decided to commit suicide after all and takes his saved-up stash of pills. Peggy calls Dr. Conway and finds out that the doctor did not give Henry sleeping pills, but instead substituted a different non-lethal pill. Jason comes home and he and Peggy give Henry coffee and help him walk off the effects of the pills. Jason tells Henry that he knew many men who died during the war—perhaps even Henry's son—who would love to have Henry's option to continue to live. In the end, Henry is happily reunited with Jason, Peggy and his professor friends, and Peggy announces she and Jason plan to have another baby.

== Cast ==
- Jeanne Crain as Peggy Taylor
- William Holden as Jason Taylor
- Edmund Gwenn as Professor Henry Barnes
- Gene Lockhart as Professor Edward Bell
- Griff Barnett as Dr. Philip Conway
- Randy Stuart as Dorothy
- Betty Lynn as Wife
- Marion Marshall as Ruth
- Pati Behrs as Jeanne
