= The Pleasure of His Company =

1961 comedy film directed by George Seaton

- Theatrical release poster
- Directed by: George Seaton
- Written by: Samuel A. Taylor
- Based on: The Pleasure of His Company by: Samuel A. Taylor; Cornelia Otis Skinner
- Produced by: William Perlberg
- Starring: Fred Astaire; Debbie Reynolds; Lilli Palmer; Tab Hunter
- Cinematography: Robert Burks
- Edited by: Alma Macrorie
- Music by: Alfred Newman
- Production company: Perlberg-Seaton Productions
- Distributed by: Paramount Pictures
- Release date: June 1, 1961
- Running time: 115 minutes
- Country: United States
- Language: English
- Box office: $3,150,000

The Pleasure of His Company is a 1961 American comedy film starring Fred Astaire, Debbie Reynolds, Lilli Palmer and Tab Hunter directed by George Seaton and released by Paramount Pictures. It is based on the 1958 play of the same name by Samuel A. Taylor and Cornelia Otis Skinner.

Astaire was nominated for a Golden Globe award for his performance.

== Plot ==
San Francisco debutante Jessica Poole hasn't seen her father, "Pogo" Poole, since the divorce between him and her mother, Katharine, many years before. Pogo went off to travel the world and enjoy himself, while Katharine remarried to stodgy banker Jim Dougherty.

Now Jessica is about to marry Roger Henderson, a cattle rancher from the Valley of the Moon in Sonoma County, and Pogo has been invited to the wedding.

Pogo arrives, as charming as he ever was. He is delighted by Jessica, and captivates her in return. He makes peace with Katharine, and even wins over Toy, the Doughertys' prized cook, though not Jim and Roger.

But Pogo is still as irresponsible as before. He invites Jessica to come away with him and "see the world." He even tries to break up her engagement, to Katharine's dismay. He also seems to be coming between Jim and Katharine, who has never quite got over her love for him.

Despite Pogo's maneuvers, the wedding goes through. But Pogo has reserved two airline tickets: who's going with him? Jim, fearing that Pogo has won over Katharine again, escorts Pogo to the airport with Katharine and her father. Jim, stopping Katharine from buying cigarettes in the airport, fears she is leaving him to meet Pogo at the plane. Jim, Katharine, and her father standing in the waiting room to see Pogo off. Katharine is angered to see that Pogo has taken Jessica's portrait, to which Jim calms her down saying, "Let him have it. After all, the poor guy is alone." Katharine's father then points to someone with Pogo, only for it to be revealed as Toy, much to Jim's dismay. Pogo and Katharine share a heartfelt smile and gaze into each other's eyes. Pogo boards a plane – with Toy.

== Cast ==
- Fred Astaire as Biddeford "Pogo" Poole
- Debbie Reynolds as Jessica Anne Poole
- Lilli Palmer as Katharine "Kate" Dougherty
- Tab Hunter as Roger Berk Henderson
- Gary Merrill as James "Jim" Dougherty
- Charles Ruggles as Mackenzie Savage
- Harold Fong as Toy
- Elvia Allman as Mrs. Mooney

At the time this film was released, Fred Astaire had given up dancing on screen. He had recently completed a dramatic performance in On the Beach in 1959 and retired from dancing in films because he was getting old. He wouldn't do another Hollywood musical until Finian's Rainbow was released in 1968. However, he did dance a little in this film during the party sequence, and even sang briefly as he teased Lilli Palmer. Famed costume designer Edith Head, who designed dresses for the film, appears early in the film, showing dresses to Debbie Reynolds.

== Original play ==
Film rights to the play were bought in February 1958 for $350,000 even before the play had been produced. It was bought by the production company of George Seaton and William Perlberg.

The play debuted on Broadway in October 1958 starring Cyril Ritchard, Cornelia Skinner, Walter Abel, Charles Ruggles, Dolores Hart and George Peppard.

During previews Variety called it "a likely Broadway smash". and when it debuted called it "entertaining and enjoyable." Brooks Atkinson of the New York Times called it "thoroughly delightful".

The success of the play led to Peppard being offered leading film roles.

The play was produced in London where it starred and was directed by Nigel Patrick.

== Development ==
Film rights were purchased by Bill Perlman and George Seaton for a minimum of $75,000.

In February 1959 Seaton reportedly wanted Fred Astaire to play the lead alongside Lilli Palmer (who had made But Not for Me for Seaton).

== Production ==
Filming had to shut down for eight months due to a strike by the Screen Actors Guild. Seaton and Perlberg made The Counterfeit Traitor in Europe during the break. Filming resumed on Pleasure in November in San Francisco.

== Awards and nominations ==
Award	Category	Nominee(s)	Result	Ref.
Berlin International Film Festival	Golden Bear	George Seaton	Nominated	
Golden Globe Awards	Best Actor in a Motion Picture – Musical or Comedy	Fred Astaire	Nominated	
