= The Opposite Sex =

1956 film by David Miller

- Theatrical release poster
- Directed by: David Miller
- Screenplay by: Fay Kanin; Michael Kanin
- Based on: The Women; 1936 play by Clare Boothe
- Produced by: Joe Pasternak
- Starring: June Allyson; Joan Collins; Dolores Gray; Ann Sheridan; Ann Miller; Leslie Nielsen; Jeff Richards; Agnes Moorehead; Charlotte Greenwood; Joan Blondell; Sam Levene
- Cinematography: Robert Bronner
- Edited by: John McSweeney Jr.
- Music by: Nicholas Brodszky; Sammy Cahn; Ralph Freed; George Stoll; Robert Van Eps
- Production company: Metro-Goldwyn-Mayer
- Distributed by: Loew's Inc.
- Release date: October 26, 1956
- Running time: 117 minutes
- Country: United States
- Language: English
- Budget: $2.8 million
- Box office: $2.8 million

The Opposite Sex is a 1956 American musical romantic comedy film starring June Allyson, Joan Collins, Dolores Gray, Ann Sheridan, and Ann Miller, with Leslie Nielsen, Jeff Richards, Agnes Moorehead, Charlotte Greenwood, Joan Blondell, and Sam Levene in supporting roles.

Directed by David Miller, the Metrocolor and CinemaScope picture is a remake of the 1939 comedy film The Women. Both films are based on Clare Boothe Luce's original 1936 play The Women.

== Plot ==
Kay Hilliard, a former nightclub singer, discovers that her husband, theater producer Steven, is having an affair with showgirl Crystal Allen. Kay's friends Sylvia Fowler and Edith Potter had known about the affair at a Manhattan salon, and attend a benefit performance at the 21 Club, where Crystal performs, though Kay is not told. Kay herself learns about the affair from her manicurist Olga, and returns home devastated.

Amanda Penrose confides to Kay to keep up appearances until Steven ends the affair. However, at their tenth wedding anniversary party, as party guests listen to one of Kay's records, she remembers her first meeting with Steven. Kay next sings a torch song, but she breaks down and runs out of the room.

In her apartment, Crystal learns that Kay has flown to Bermuda while Steven prepares to tour his new stage show. Crystal uses the opportunity to meet Steven in the park and teases if they could spend the day together, though Steven declines. Kay returns home early and Steven is thrilled.

Kay later attends a benefit concert, where Crystal performs a specialty dance number. Backstage, when the number is over, Crystal antagonizes Kay. Sylvia tells her that Crystal had been with Steven and their daughter Debbie in the park. Kay soon marches into Crystal's dressing room to confront her. She warns Crystal to never see her daughter and calls her dress cheap. Crystal replies if Steven doesn't like her dress, she will find a better one, which provokes Kay to slap her and leave the room.

As Kay prepares to leave, Steven tries to explain himself, but she is unconvinced and drives away in a taxi. Kay travels alone by train to Reno to divorce Steven. Aboard the train, she meets Countess Lavaliere and Gloria Dell, an entertainer. In Reno, the women stay at a ranch, where Kay meets cowboy Buck Winston and takes a romantic canoe ride with him.

Inside their lodge, Sylvia unexpectedly arrives after her husband Howard has left her for another woman. She reads a newspaper item Edith has mailed, and Kay deduces Gloria is the other woman. Sylvia and Gloria initiate a catfight, which wrecks the kitchen. Immediately after, Sylvia meets Buck and the two become lovers.

Within weeks, Kay's divorce is finalized though she remains in love with Steven. Amanda pleads for Kay to reconcile with her ex-husband, who calls her to inform that he is marrying Crystal. Sometime later, Kay returns to her nightclub career and performs under her maiden name "Ashley". Meanwhile, Crystal, who has married Steven, does not get along with Debbie and starts an affair with Buck, whom Sylvia is grooming into a professional singer. Amanda, Gloria, and Countess Lavaliere invite Kay to Buck's nightclub opening act, but Kay refuses knowing Steven will be with Crystal.

In her mother's apartment, Debbie joins Kay in bed. There, she reveals that Steven still loves Kay and has fights with Crystal, who repeatedly converses with another man over the phone. Kay suspects it is Buck, and she arrives at the nightclub in a full evening gown. There, she greets Steven and enlists gossip columnist Dolly DeHaven's help in getting revenge on Sylvia. Kay goes into the ladies' room and reveals to Sylvia that Buck and Crystal are romantically involved. Dolly confirms the gossip, which upsets Sylvia.

Sylvia marches into Buck's dressing room to confirm the allegation. Buck apologizes and performs his number. As Buck performs, Sylvia takes Crystal backstage and is followed by Kay and the other women. Kay prevents a catfight between Sylvia and Crystal while Dolly threatens to publish the affair, which will ruin Crystal's chances of receiving alimony from Steven. Crystal nevertheless retorts she will elope with Buck and decides to leave Steven. When Crystal reunites with Buck, he states he has no intention of marrying her. Kay spots Steven sitting alone, and when she calls him over, they dance together.

== Cast ==
- June Allyson as Kay Hilliard
- Joan Collins as Crystal Allen
- Dolores Gray as Sylvia Fowler
- Ann Sheridan as Amanda Penrose
- Ann Miller as Gloria Dell
- Leslie Nielsen as Steven Hilliard
- Jeff Richards as Buck Winston
- Agnes Moorehead as Countess Lavaliere
- Charlotte Greenwood as Lucy
- Joan Blondell as Edith Potter
- Sam Levene as Mike Pearl
- Bill Goodwin as Howard Fowler
- Alice Pearce as Olga
- Barbara Jo Allen as Dolly DeHaven
- Sandy Descher as Debbie Hilliard
- Carolyn Jones as Pat
- Alan Marshal as Ted
- Jonathan Hole as Phelps Potter
- Harry James as himself
- Art Mooney as himself
- Dick Shawn as singer
- Jim Backus as psychiatrist
- Barrie Chase as specialty dancer (uncredited)
- Gordon Richards as Hilliards' butler (uncredited)
- Dean Jones as backstage delivery person (uncredited)
- Leslie Parrish as leg model (uncredited)
- Juanita Moore as powder room attendant (uncredited)
- Dolores Fuller in an uncredited bit role

== Production ==
In November 1955, columnist Hedda Hopper reported that Ann Sheridan had signed onto the project, while producer Joe Pasternak was pursuing Marlene Dietrich and Miriam Hopkins. A month later, MGM announced the lead roles would be played by June Allyson, Dolores Gray, Ann Miller (as the husband stealer), and Leslie Nielsen with filming to begin January 16, 1956. Jeff Richards was cast as Buck Winston in an effort by MGM to build on his success after starring in Seven Brides For Seven Brothers (1954).

Elaine Stewart was promised Joan Collins' role before filming. Grace Kelly was intended for June Allyson's role, but she had retired from acting. Dore Schary, MGM's head of production, had envisioned Esther Williams in Allyson's role. According to her 2000 autobiography The Million Dollar Mermaid, Williams objected to Schary's casting suggestion, which resulted in her suspension from the studio. Shortly after, on agent Lew Wasserman's advice, she left MGM after 14 years. Eleanor Parker was cast as Kay Hilliard, but she was replaced by Allyson.

Unlike the 1936 play and the 1939 film adaptation, The Opposite Sex includes musical numbers and features male actors who portray the husbands and boyfriends, whose characters were only referred to in the previous film and stage versions. Fay Kanin, who cowrote the script with her husband Michael, said the studio's argument was "you can't play a love scene alone." Michael said MGM "felt the movie audience would somehow be disappointed at not seeing men in it. After all, a man is a fact." Fay thought the "manless world" of the play "was a stunt, an artificial trick, but it was accepted. But in a movie, which has the freedom to go out, the device would seem constrained and self conscious." Michael claimed "we only put in men to relieve the strain - and only when they are called for."

The Kanins gave the story a show business background to help justify it being turned into a musical, but "there are no big production numbers," according to Fay Kanin.

== Reception ==
=== Box office ===
According to MGM records, The Opposite Sex earned $1,735,000 in the U.S. and Canada and $1,025,000 in other markets, resulting in a loss of $1,513,000.

=== Critical reaction ===
Bosley Crowther wrote in The New York Times that the film "is a surface inspection of a segment of Manhattan society rather than the deep dissection it once was." Nevertheless, he complimented the performances of the female cast, including June Allyson, and felt "the lush wardrobes, enhanced by excellent color photography, provided for this covey of dames, is enough to drive distaff viewers to distraction." Philip K. Scheuer of the Los Angeles Times was not as pleased with this musical adaptation, but wrote: "The gals are all smartly costumed and give spirited performances, and it is good to find former favorites, Sheridan and Blondell, among them ... The new screenplay by Fay and Michael Kanin, who have doubtlessly preserved the best of the original wisecracks and the direction by David Miller."

William Brogdon of Variety called the film a "high-powered entertainment with a name cast and boxoffice potential. The mixture of marriage and morals, songs and satire, under Joe Pasternak's topnotch production supervision plays with a pleasing frothy glibnes as the femmes test their claws on each other and on their men." Harrison's Reports called the film: "A good comedy-drama with music, photographed in CinemaScope and Metrocolor, and bolstered by a star studded cast."

In the Orlando Sentinel, critic Jean Yothers wrote that the film "sparkles with snappy dialogue, a parade of smart fashions and a beauty of a hair-pulling, dress-tearing, name-calling fight" and that "several entertaining subplots keep popping up as do a group of musical numbers," but noted that "it does seem an unfortunate waste of talent to have Dolores Gray around and not singing and Ann Miller around and not dancing."

In the 21st century, a review of the film on AllMovie by Craig Butler reported that "if it's a disappointing and flawed adaptation [of The Women], it's still good fun on its own terms," and noted that it had "a mediocre score with poor and unimaginative lyrics," but that Gray is "a delectable steamroller in her scenes." On the review aggregator website Rotten Tomatoes, 40% of 5 critics' reviews are positive.

== Accolades ==
The film was nominated for a Golden Globe Award for Best Musical or Comedy Picture in 1957.

== See also ==
- List of American films of 1956
