= The Rat Race =

1960 film by Robert Mulligan

- 1960 theatrical poster
- Directed by: Robert Mulligan
- Screenplay by: Garson Kanin
- Based on: The Rat Race; 1949 play by Garson Kanin
- Produced by: William Perlberg; George Seaton
- Starring: Tony Curtis; Debbie Reynolds; Jack Oakie; Don Rickles
- Cinematography: Robert Burks
- Edited by: Alma Macrorie
- Music by: Elmer Bernstein
- Color process: Technicolor
- Distributed by: Paramount Pictures
- Release date: July 10, 1960 (U.S.)
- Running time: 105 minutes
- Country: United States
- Language: English
- Box office: $3,400,000 (US/ Canada)

The Rat Race is a 1960 American romantic comedy-drama film adapted from the play of the same name by Garson Kanin. Directed by Robert Mulligan, it stars Tony Curtis and Debbie Reynolds as struggling young entertainment professionals in New York City. Filming took place in Pittsburgh, Pennsylvania and Philadelphia. Sam Butera and Gerry Mulligan have minor roles as saxophonists.

== Plot ==
Wishing to pursue a career as a jazz saxophonist, Pete Hammond Jr. takes a bus from his home in Milwaukee, Wisconsin, to New York City and optimistically begins looking for work. However, jobs are extremely hard to find. He crosses paths with Peggy Brown, a model and taxi dancer who has become jaded and cynical after years of struggling to survive in the city. She has just been evicted from an apartment rented to Pete, and because she is penniless and has no home to return to, he offers to let her stay with him. She is forced to rely on his generosity, and as the two of them work at various low-paying jobs, they stay together in the apartment as friends.

Peggy warns him that people cannot be trusted, but Pete is encouraged when a band auditions him for a job. When the other musicians send him to get beers, Pete returns to find that they have stolen his instruments and that he is the victim of a scam, thus proving Peggy right. Pete lands a job as an "alto man" on a cruise ship but has no instruments.

Peggy goes to the abusive taxi dance hall owner she works for, Nellie Miller (Don Rickles), to whom she is already in debt, for another loan to give to Pete and she agrees to prostitute herself with his patrons to pay back her debts. Maintaining a cynical front, Peggy convinces a suspicious Pete that she got the money with "no strings attached".

Pete writes to Peggy daily throughout the next month while on the cruise. When she stalls at fulfilling her end of their deal, Nellie strips Peggy of her dress and shoes to make his point that he owns her. She runs out on their deal again the night Pete returns, and Nellie threatens to disfigure her. In love with Peggy and afraid for her, Pete gives up all his wages, his wristwatch and his new instruments to pay off Nellie. Later, Pete professes his love to Peggy and they kiss; then he confesses to Peggy that he "mixed" with three women as part of his cruise ship job. Peggy agrees to stay with Pete, but then she tells him that he needs to stop working on cruise ships.

== Cast ==
- Tony Curtis as Pete Hammond Jr.
- Debbie Reynolds as Peggy Brown
- Jack Oakie as Mac Macreavy
- Kay Medford as Mrs. 'Soda' Gallo
- Don Rickles as Nellie Miller
- Marjorie Bennett as Edie Kerry
- Hal K. Dawson as Bo Kerry
- Norman Fell as Telephone Repairman
- Lisa Drake as Toni
- Joe Bushkin as Frankie
- Sam Butera as Carl
- Gerry Mulligan as Gerry
- Elmer Bernstein as a member of The Red Peppers

== See also ==
- List of American films of 1960
