= The Meanest Man in the World =

1943 film directed by Sidney Lanfield

- Theatrical release poster
- Directed by: Sidney Lanfield
- Written by: Morrie Ryskind (uncredited)
- Screenplay by: George Seaton; Allan House
- Based on: The Meanest Man in the World by George M. Cohan
- Produced by: William Perlberg
- Starring: Jack Benny; Priscilla Lane; Rochester; Edmund Gwenn; Matt Briggs
- Cinematography: J. Peverell Marley
- Edited by: Robert Bischoff
- Music by: Cyril J. Mockridge
- Production company: 20th Century Fox
- Distributed by: 20th Century Fox
- Release date: February 12, 1943
- Running time: 57 minutes
- Country: United States
- Language: English

The Meanest Man in the World is a 1943 American comedy film directed by Sidney Lanfield, starring Jack Benny and Priscilla Lane, based upon a play that starred George M. Cohan, who produced it on Broadway and released by 20th Century Fox. The supporting cast features Eddie "Rochester" Anderson, Edmund Gwenn and Anne Revere. The picture's screenplay was written by George Seaton and Allan House. The plotline involves a kind lawyer (Benny) who pretends to be mean in order to further his career, which has the unforeseen repercussion of placing his romance with Lane's character in serious jeopardy.

The story was filmed once before in the silent era in 1923 by First National with Bert Lytell and Blanche Sweet. Only a fragment survives of the silent.

== Plot ==
Richard Clarke is a lawyer with his own legal practice in Pottsville, New York. His black paralegal assistant continuously claims that Clarke is far too nice a man to be a profitable businessman, since he always fails to demand payment from his poor clients and never takes on those he doesn't believe are innocent. But Clarke's main problem is that he is hopelessly in love with the lovely Janie Brown. Janie's wealthy father has decided that Janie will marry the even wealthier bachelor Bill Potts. Clarke remains completely oblivious of this fact.

One day, after Janie and her father visited Clarke in his office, they are hit by a truck on their way home in their car. Clarke wants to impress the father, and starts to litigate against the poor farmer who drove the truck, claiming a large amount of money for the damages. But after learning that the farmer lacks funds to pay the damages, the good-hearted Clarke stops his litigation. Mr. Brown isn't impressed at all by Clarke's efforts, but he tells him that he has excellent qualities as a lawyer and should go to New York City to make better use of them.

That said and done, Clarke brings his paralegal and moves to New York to start earning the big bucks. His plans come to shame, as not a single client comes to ask for his help in the first four months. Ashamed of his misfortune, he panics when he gets a message that Janie and her father are coming for a visit. Clarke desperately tries to find a more upscale apartment to impress them. While visiting a nice building, Clarke and Shufro overhear a couple arguing and leaving their apartment in anger. Clarke then occupies the apartment while the couple is gone, and receives Janie and Mr. Brown in it. Shufro is on the lookout outside, and when the couple returns to the building, Clarke takes Janie and Mr. Brown out to a nightclub. Janie is so impressed with Clarke's achievements that she wants to marry him immediately. Clarke convinces her that they should wait for a month, giving him time to secretly sort out his situation.

Having spent every last cent on visiting nightclubs with Janie and her father, Clarke is forced to change his ways to get some paying clients. While practicing being mean on the street, Clarke steals a lollipop from a little boy, and unfortunately the act is captured on film by a passing photographer. The picture ends up in the newspaper the next day, with a headline that reads "Meanest Man In The World Takes Candy From Baby".

After the initial shock, Clarke happily discovers that a lot of rich clients are attracted to his practice because of the article. Among others, billionaire Frederick P. Leggitt comes to visit him at the office, looking for representation for an eviction of the billionaire's old sister-in-law, Frances. After more of the same kind of "mean" publicity, hordes of clients arrive at Clarke's office and business is booming. In secret, Clarke takes care of Frances and lets her live in his apartment.

Janie is appalled by Clarke's seeming new personality, and during a visit she breaks off their engagement. While Clarke is out drowning his sorrows at a bar an unfortunate series of misunderstandings regarding Frances ensue, and the public is led to believe she has taken her life in the river.

Janie, who is also out drowning her sorrows, hears that Clarke lives with a woman in his apartment, and when she bumps into Clarke on the street, she slaps him in anger over his deceit. Another photographer is in place and captures the scene. The next day the picture is published, saying that Janie is the woman living with Clarke in the apartment. Mr. Brown sees the article and reacts violently.

Mr. Brown forces both Clarke and Janie to go to her apartment in New York. With the help of a judge, Mr. Brown makes the couple marry on the spot. Before this, Shufro has told Janie the truth about Clarke's "room mate" Frances. When the couple is married Mr. Brown orders Clarke to stay in Pottsville and reform and learn how to be less mean and a good husband. Happily Janie then explains the misunderstanding to her father.

== Cast ==
- Jack Benny as Richard Clarke
- Priscilla Lane as Janie Brown
- Eddie "Rochester" Anderson as Shufro
- Edmund Gwenn as Frederick P. Leggitt
- Matt Briggs as Mr. Brown
- Anne Revere as Miss Crockett
- Margaret Seddon as Mrs. Frances H. Leggitt
- Helene Reynolds as Wife
- Gary Gray as Boy With Lollipop
- Lyle Talbot as Bill Potts
- Harry Hayden as Mr. Chambers
- Hobart Cavanaugh as Mr. Throckmorton
- Tor Johnson as Vladimir Pulasky
- Gladden James as Clerk (uncredited)

== Box office ==
The film earned $1.3 million in the US.

== Radio adaptation ==
The Meanest Man in the World was presented on Theatre Guild on the Air February 17, 1952. The one-hour adaptation starred James Stewart, Josephine Hull, and Colleen Gray.
