= For Heaven's Sake (1950 film) =

1950 film by George Seaton

- Directed by: George Seaton
- Written by: George Seaton
- Based on: May We Come In? 1949 play by Harry Segall; Dorothy Segall
- Produced by: William Perlberg
- Starring: Clifton Webb; Joan Bennett; Robert Cummings
- Cinematography: Lloyd Ahern
- Edited by: Robert L. Simpson
- Music by: Alfred Newman
- Distributed by: 20th Century-Fox
- Release date: December 15, 1950
- Running time: 92 minutes
- Country: United States
- Language: English
- Box office: $1.7 million (US rentals)

For Heaven's Sake is a 1950 American fantasy film starring Clifton Webb as an angel trying to save the marriage of a couple played by Joan Bennett and Robert Cummings. It was adapted from the play May We Come In? by Harry Segall.

== Plot ==
Angels Charles and Arthur try to convince a young cherub named Item to stop waiting to be born to Lydia and Jeff Bolton, her parents who she has personally selected. The Boltons are too busy with their theater work to start a family and are also drifting apart, as Lydia wants to have a child but Jeff convinces her to put their careers first.

When Item proves adamant, Charles tries to help by taking human form as "Slim" Charles, a supposedly rich Montanan, and encountering the Boltons at a racetrack. Jeff sees a potential financial backer (an "angel" in theatrical slang) for his next play, so he asks his playwright Daphne Peters to try to convince Charles to invest in the production, not knowing that Charles does not have any money. Jeff's usual backer Tex Henry appears and draws cards with Charles to determine who will make the investment, and Tex wins.

Charles begins to enjoy human vices. When Daphne's former actor boyfriend Tony Clark returns for her, Charles punches him. Charles also starts playing modern music on his harp and drinking, but Arthur disapproves.

Charles has not completely forgotten his mission. He arranges a lavish party to celebrate the Boltons' eighth anniversary, but it does not work as planned. The Boltons decide to break up, and Charles is taken to the mental hospital, where he admits that he is an angel. When Lydia develops a sudden craving for peanuts, Jeff realizes that she is pregnant (with Item), and they reconcile.

== Cast ==
- Clifton Webb as Charles / "Slim" Charles
- Joan Bennett as Lydia Bolton
- Robert Cummings as Jeff Bolton
- Edmund Gwenn as Arthur
- Joan Blondell as Daphne Peters
- Gigi Perreau as Item
- Jack La Rue as Tony Clark
- Harry von Zell as Tex Henry
- Tommy Rettig as Joe Blake
- Hal Baylor as an Expectant Father(uncredited)
- Whit Bissell as a Doctor(uncredited)
- Charles Lane as IRS agent (uncredited)

== Production ==
The film was to have starred Anne Baxter, but she withdrew and Joan Bennett assumed the role. Filming began in June 1950.

== Release ==
In a contemporary review, critic Bosley Crowther of The New York Times wrote: "Mr. Webb, need we say, is an actor with an urbane sense of the grotesque and a thoroughly cultivated talent for farcical mimicry. So his broad travesty of a rancher 'from God's country,' whose particular line is 'sheep' and whose weakness is wine and women, is very amusing to see. But we have to advise that the whimsies with which this picture begins and in which it dissolves at the climax are far on the sticky side—the sort of stuff that may seem poignant if you're a softie, but nauseating if you're not."

== See also ==
- List of films about angels
