= Teacher's Pet (1958 film) =

1958 film by George Seaton

- French poster for Teacher's Pet
- Directed by: George Seaton
- Written by: Fay Kanin; Michael Kanin
- Produced by: William Perlberg; George Seaton
- Starring: Clark Gable; Doris Day; Gig Young; Mamie Van Doren; Nick Adams
- Cinematography: Haskell B. Boggs
- Edited by: Alma Macrorie
- Music by: Roy Webb
- Distributed by: Paramount Pictures
- Release date: March 19, 1958
- Running time: 120 minutes
- Country: United States
- Language: English
- Box office: $2.7 million

Teacher's Pet is a 1958 American romantic comedy film directed by George Seaton, and starring Clark Gable, Doris Day, Gig Young, and Mamie Van Doren.

== Plot ==
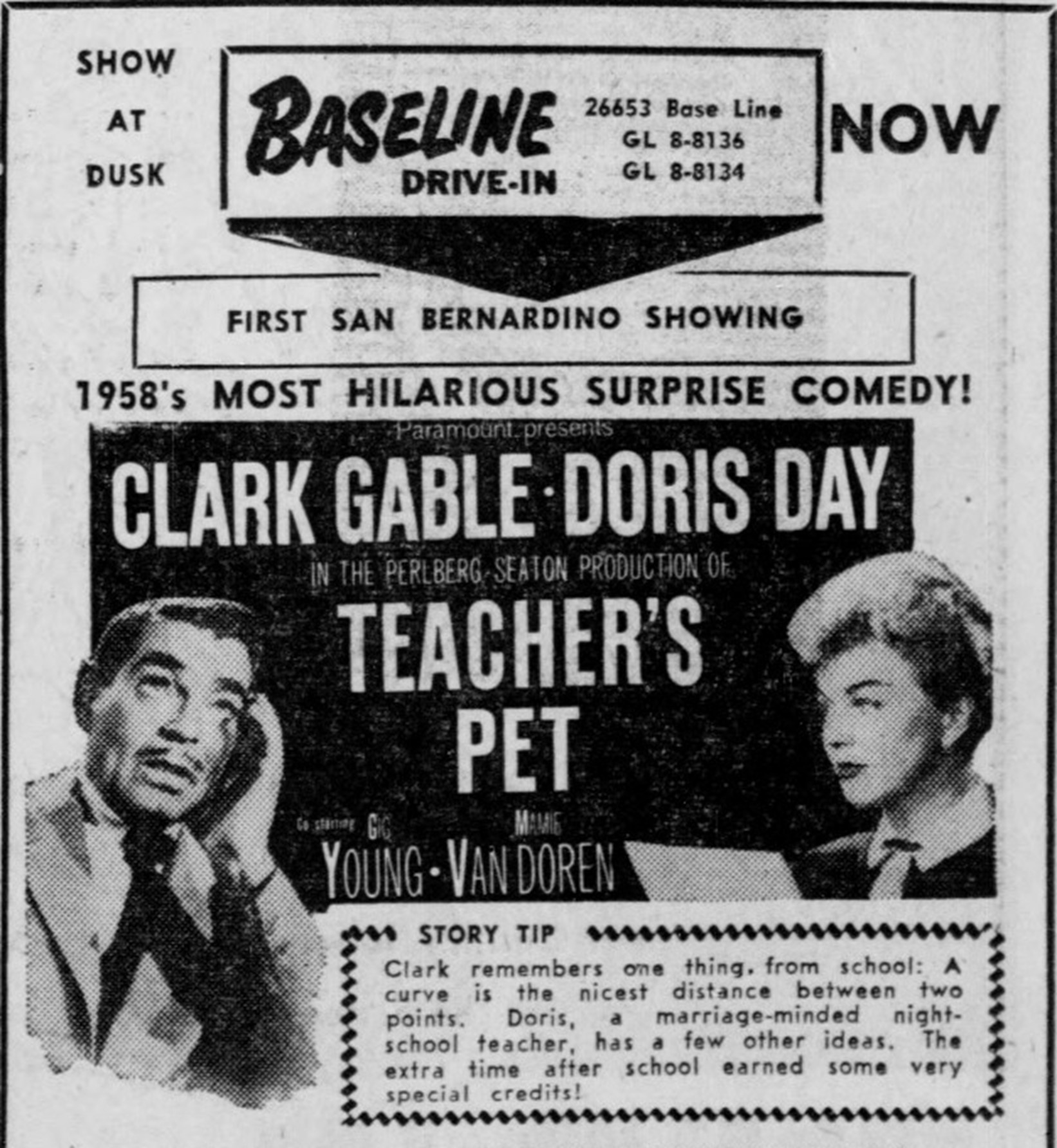
Drive-in advertisement from 1958

College journalism instructor Erica Stone asks Chronicle City Editor James Gannon to be a guest lecturer for her night school class. Due to his strong opinions against women reporters, that journalism is best learned on the job, and that higher education is a waste of time, Jim turns down the invitation via a nasty letter to Erica. His managing editor, however, orders Jim to accept the assignment. Taking a seat at the back of class, Jim endures Erica's reading his letter aloud, mocking him as old-fashioned and irascible. He is not recognized.

Offended, Jim decides to join the class as a student, posing as wallpaper salesman "Jim Gallagher", to show up Erica's "dilettante" opinions and methods. When he returns after registering, Jim insists he can catch up on the class assignment, dismissively adding that newspaper writing doesn't look so hard. Skeptical, Erica gives him a fact sheet on a story and tells him to produce a 250-word account. When Jim hands her his 150-word story in 5 minutes, Erica decides to humble him by reading his paper to the class, certain it cannot be good. To her astonishment, he has turned a list of facts about a thug who shot a grocery store owner into a compelling, yet concise, short story. Erica becomes intrigued by this older man, who claims he has no training and yet has exceptional ability. Believing that the class pace will slow his progress, Erica offers to tutor Jim outside of class in the evenings. Meanwhile, she encourages him to develop a "think piece" of 2,000 words on the social factors and conditions that led to the killing. This is the type of article Jim considers a waste of space, but he assigns his homework to a reporter on his staff who embodies what he disdains, a Phi Beta Kappa graduate.

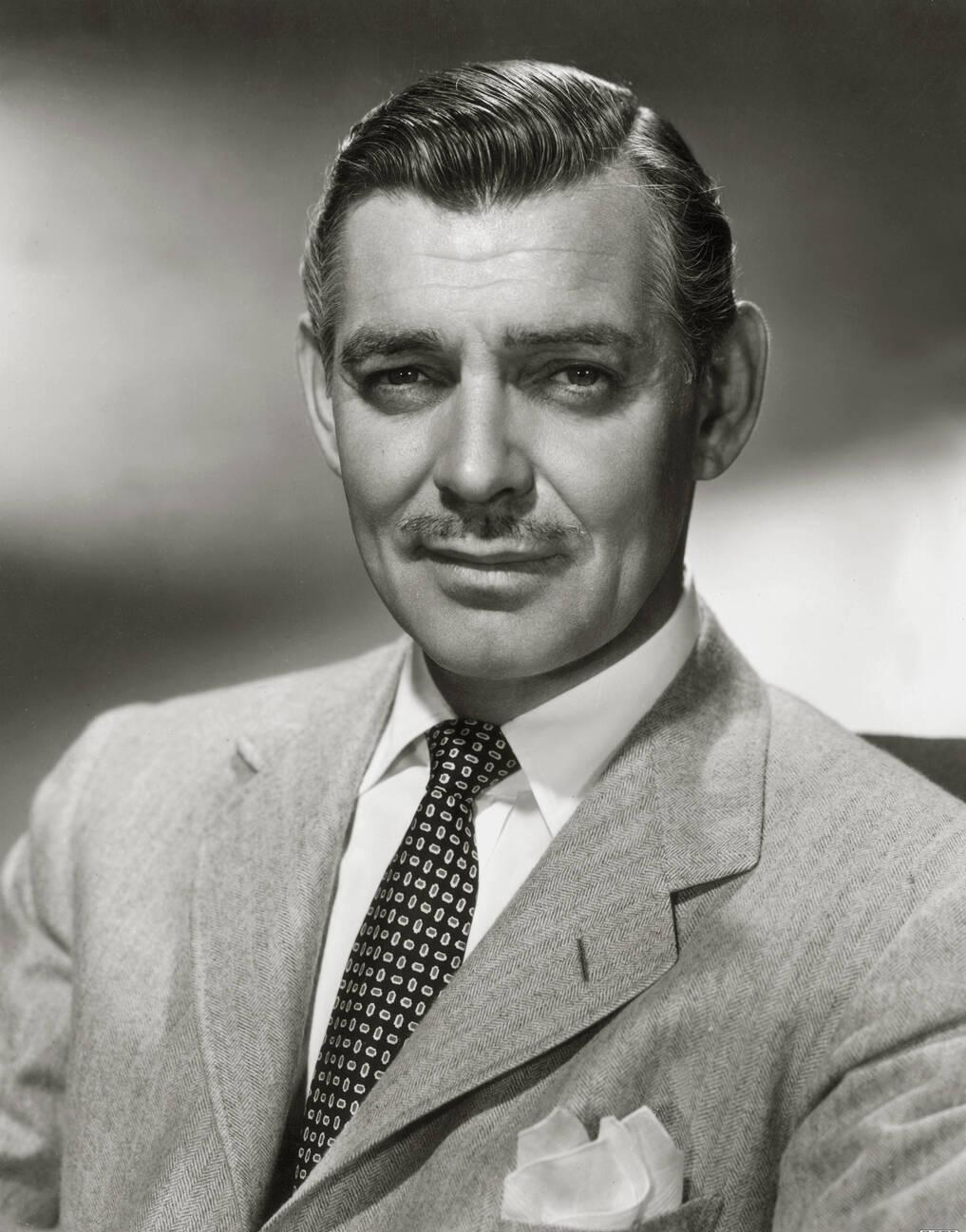
Clark Gable (pictured in 1945) plays Jim Gannon, who disdains college-educated journalists yet carries out a ruse initially to expose―and later to romance—a journalism instructor.

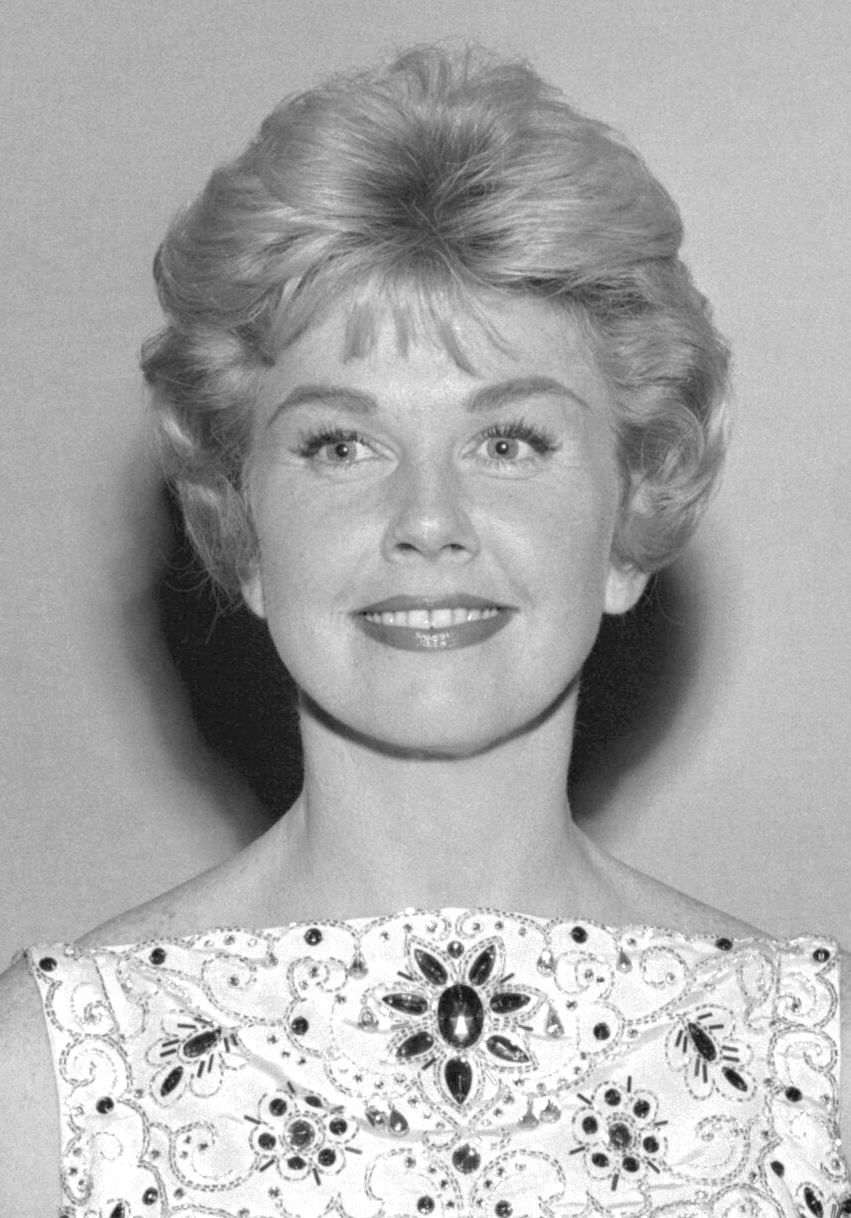
Doris Day plays journalism instructor Erica Stone, who believes Jim Gannon is talented student Jim Gallagher.

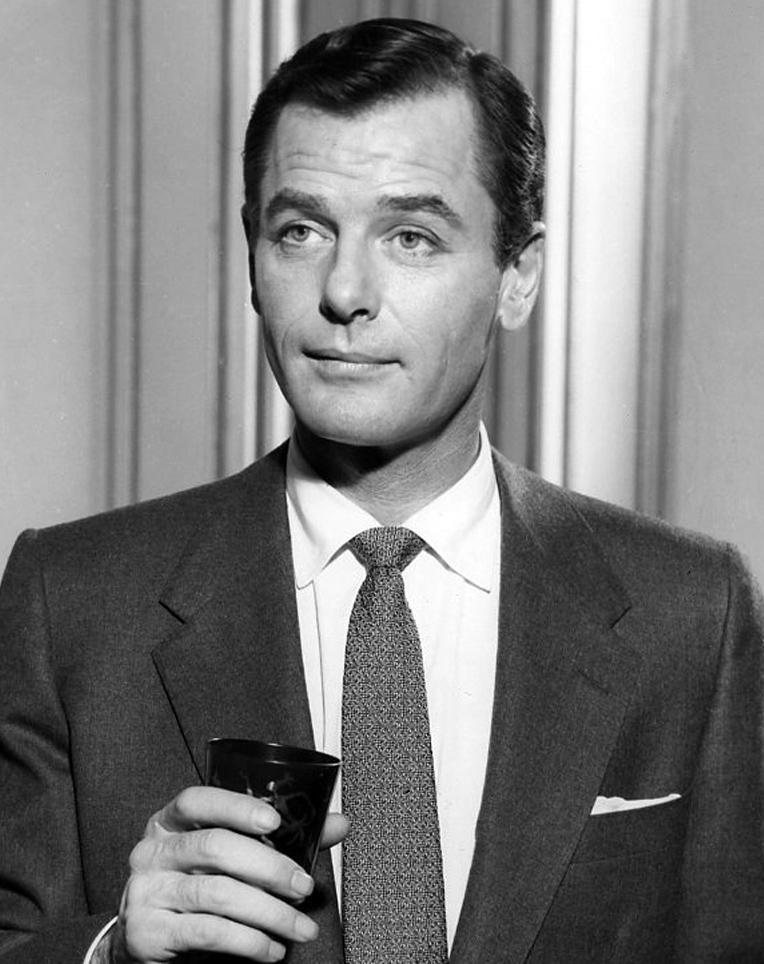
Gig Young plays psychologist Dr. Hugo Pine, know-it-all who helps straighten out the mess.

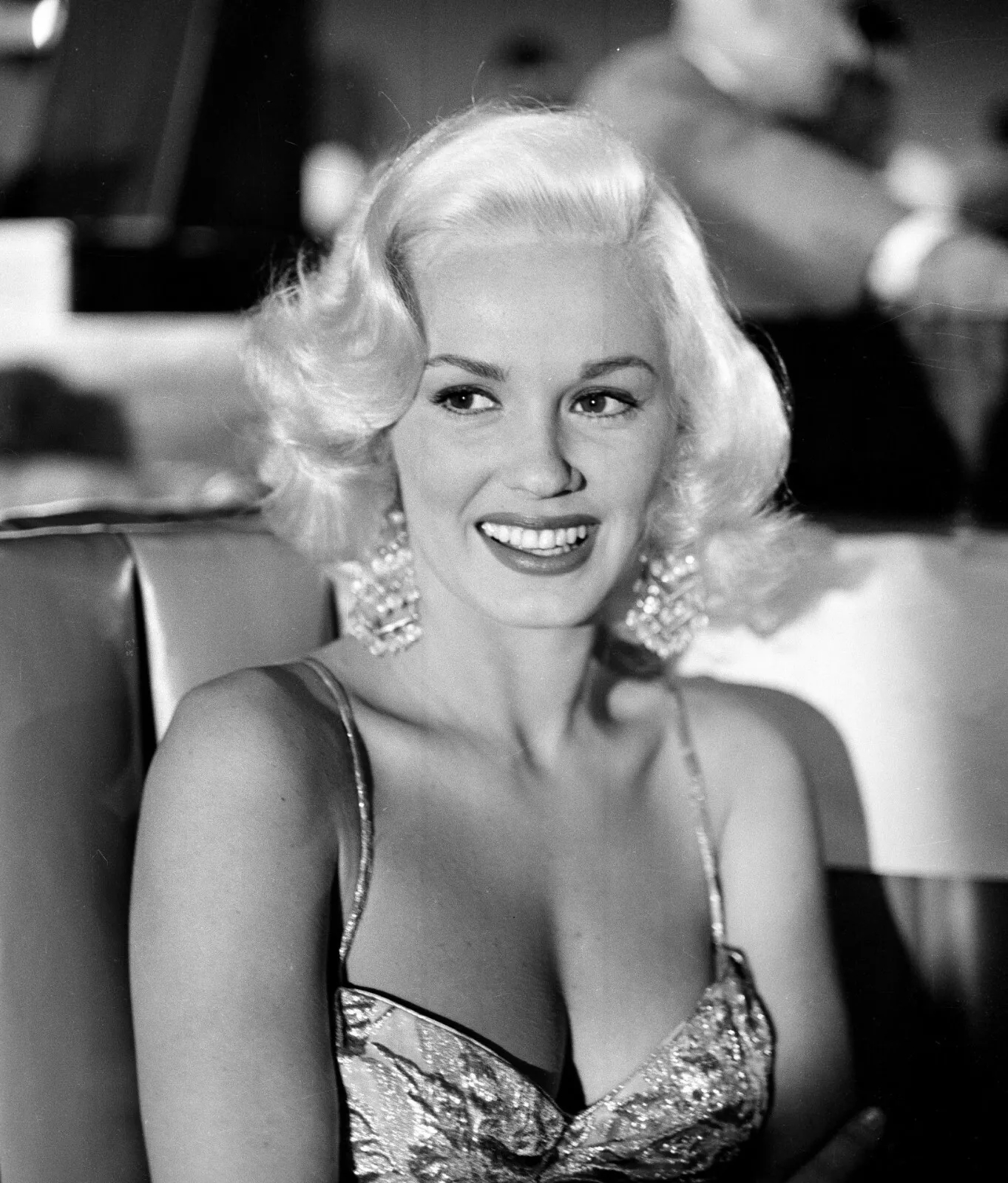
Mamie Van Doren plays Peggy DeFore, Jim Gannon's night club singer girlfriend who does a burlesque rendition of "The Girl Who Invented Rock and Roll".

Attracted to Erica, Jim continues his ruse, planning to make the most of evening lessons. When Jim attempts to book "a lesson" at a restaurant, Erica's secretary informs him that Erica is booked for many evenings with his competition—psychologist Dr. Hugo Pine, co-author with Erica on a book. When Erica and Hugo turn up where Jim is watching his nightclub singer girlfriend, Peggy DeFore, perform a tacky burlesque act, Jim is embarrassed. Worse, Hugo is a know-it-all whom Jim cannot outshine in any area—sports trivia, war stories, bongo playing, Mambo dancing, fluency in the Watusi language—until Jim succeeds in getting Hugo drunk enough to pass out. To Jim's delight, Erica is amused by Hugo's failing, admitting that she finds his "perfection" a strain.

The next day, Jim consults Hugo on his situation, pretending it's for a friend named Max. Undeceived, Hugo declares that Jim is in love with Erica, advising him to confess his deceit before she finds out for herself. Jim admits to having paid the waiter $5 to spike Hugo's drinks, while Hugo groans and admits that he only paid the waiter $2 to spike Jim's.

Erica goes to the Chronicle's managing editor (Jim's boss) to recommend hiring "Jim Gallagher". When Jim Gannon is called into the office, Erica discovers the deception, later expressing anger at his having wasted her time away from other students. Jim apologizes to her, but she calls off their relationship. Coming to respect Erica's and Hugo's value of education, Jim fires Barney Kovac, whom he has been tutoring on the job, telling Barney that he will hire him back after he graduates from college.

When Erica next sees Hugo, he intercedes on Jim's behalf, revealing that Jim had intended to confess his deceit and is remorseful. Also present at Hugo's—unknowingly within Erica's earshot—Jim expresses that her father, Pulitzer Prize-winning journalist Joel Barlow Stone, was the overrated editor of a gossipy and unbusinesslike country newspaper. Reviewing her father's articles critically, Erica realizes his folksy style is outdated.

Eventually, with Jim present, Erica proposes to the Chronicle's managing editor that Jim give a series of lectures presenting a more practical approach to journalism. Jim's boss reveals that Jim has proposed inserting more interpretation of the news. In the end, Jim and Erica have accepted each other's point of view, clearly in love with each other.

== Cast ==
- Clark Gable as James Gannon – city editor for a large metropolitan newspaper, with no education past the 8th grade, who is convinced that formal education is "a waste of time" for anyone who would like to get into the newspaper business and that experience in the workplace is the key to success
- Doris Day as Erica Stone – journalism instructor at a local university with whom Gannon falls in love
- Gig Young as Dr. Hugo Pine – a worldly and attractive psychologist who has "more degrees than a thermometer", and Gannon's (perceived) rival for Stone's affections
- Mamie Van Doren as Peggy DeFore – nightclub singer and Gannon's girlfriend
- Nick Adams as Barney Kovac – copy boy at Gannon's paper who idolizes him.
- Peter Baldwin as Harold Miller, cub reporter
- Marion Ross as Katy Fuller, Stone's secretary
- Charles Lane as Roy, assistant city editor
- Army Archerd as Himself
- Florenz Ames as JR Ballantyne

== Release ==
The film opened in the United States on March 19, 1958, and finished fifth at the US box office in its opening week.

== Critical response ==
A contemporary review of the film in Variety newspaper described it as having "rich new life and liveliness, and even a fresh approach with humor and heartiness," with "Gable particularly turning in one of his best performances in years." The New York Times described the film as "not in line for a Pulitzer Prize but it is like a kiss or a well-written yarn, a pleasant experience," and that "all concerned have welded romance, ribbing and reality into a cheerful and charming entertainment." Writing for Turner Classic Movies, Andrea Passafiume described the film as a "charming romantic comedy," and noted that "Van Doren belts out 'The Girl Who Invented Rock and Roll' in one memorable scene."

== Awards and nominations ==
Award	Category	Nominee(s)	Result	Ref.
Academy Awards	Best Supporting Actor	Gig Young	Nominated	
Academy Awards	Best Story and Screenplay – Written Directly for the Screen	Fay Kanin and Michael Kanin	Nominated	
Directors Guild of America Awards	Outstanding Directorial Achievement in Motion Pictures	George Seaton	Nominated	
Golden Globe Awards	Best Actor in a Motion Picture – Musical or Comedy	Clark Gable	Nominated	
Golden Globe Awards	Best Supporting Actor – Motion Picture	Gig Young	Nominated	
Laurel Awards	Top Comedy		4th Place	
Laurel Awards	Top Male Comedy Performance	Clark Gable	Nominated	
Laurel Awards	Top Male Comedy Performance	Gig Young	4th Place	
Writers Guild of America Awards	Best Written American Comedy	Fay Kanin and Michael Kanin	Nominated	

== See also ==
- List of American films of 1958
