= Hustling (film) =

1975 American made for TV movie

- Genre: Drama
- Based on: Hustling: Prostitution in Our Wide Open Society by Gail Sheehy
- Screenplay by: Fay Kanin
- Directed by: Joseph Sargent
- Starring: Lee Remick; Jill Clayburgh; Melanie Mayron; Beverly Hope Atkinson
- Theme music composer: Jerry Fielding
- Country of origin: United States
- Original language: English

Production
- Producer: Lillian Gallo
- Production location: New York City
- Cinematography: Bill Butler
- Editor: George Jay Nicholson
- Production companies: Filmways Television; Lillian Gallo Productions

Original release
- Network: ABC
- Release: February 22, 1975

Hustling is a 1975 American television film directed by Joseph Sargent based on a book about prostitution by Gail Sheehy. The film stars Jill Clayburgh as Wanda ("Redpants"), alongside Lee Remick, while its script is written by Fay Kanin.

== Cast ==
- Lee Remick as Fran Morrison
- Monte Markham as Orin Dietrich
- Jill Clayburgh as Wanda
- Alex Rocco as Swifty
- Melanie Mayron as Dee Dee
- Burt Young as Gustavino
- Beverly Hope Atkinson as Giselle
- Howard Hesseman as Detective

== Reception ==
Jill Clayburgh credited the film as important in her career. "It changed my career,” Clayburgh said. “It was a part that I did well, and suddenly people wanted me. Sidney Furie saw me, and wanted me for Gable and Lombard." Her performance in the TV film eventually earned her an nomination for a Primetime Emmy Award for Outstanding Single Performance by a Supporting Actress in a Comedy or Drama Special. The film was also nominated for the Primetime Emmy Award for Outstanding Writing in a Special Program – Drama or Comedy (Original) at the 27th Primetime Emmy Awards.
