= A Double Life (1947 film) =

- Theatrical release poster
- Directed by: George Cukor
- Written by: Ruth Gordon; Garson Kanin
- Produced by: Michael Kanin
- Starring: Ronald Colman; Signe Hasso; Edmond O'Brien
- Cinematography: Milton R. Krasner
- Edited by: Robert Parrish
- Music by: Miklós Rózsa
- Production company: Kanin Productions
- Distributed by: Universal Pictures
- Release dates: December 25, 1947 (Los Angeles); February 19, 1948 (New York City)
- Running time: 104 minutes
- Country: United States
- Language: English
- Box office: $1.7 million (US rentals)

A Double Life is a 1947 American film noir that tells the story of Tony John, an actor whose mind becomes affected by the character whom he portrays. It stars Ronald Colman and Signe Hasso and was directed by George Cukor, with its screenplay written by Ruth Gordon and Garson Kanin. Colman won the Academy Award for Best Actor for his performance.

== Plot ==
Celebrated stage actor Anthony "Tony" John is offered the lead in a new production of William Shakespeare's Othello by theatrical producer Max Lasker, who wants Tony's ex-wife Brita to costar as Desdemona. Tony initially declines the offer, to the relief of director Victor Donlan, who knows that Tony becomes overly involved in his roles. Brita agrees with Donlan and warns press agent Bill Friend that although Tony's mood is delightful when appearing in a comedy, he is terrifying when performing in a drama. She warns Friend that Tony becomes so immersed in roles that they can become his reality.

Tony changes his mind after becoming obsessed with the idea of portraying Othello. While contemplating the role, Tony meets Pat Kroll, an unsophisticated waitress in an Italian bistro and they begin a casual affair. Brita reluctantly accepts the role of Desdemona and rehearsals begin. The production opens to rave reviews, but Tony gradually becomes absorbed in his role and begins to lose sight of where the play ends and his real life begins. Tony sees jealousy as the key to his character.

Brita shows Tony a locket that Bill gave her for her birthday, sparking a jealous rage in Tony. That night, during Othello's "kiss of death" scene with Desdemona, Tony becomes overcome with the role and nearly chokes Brita to death. When the play begins its second year, Tony asks Brita to remarry him, but she refuses. Tony suspects that Brita is in love with Bill. Enraged, confused and delirious, Tony visits Pat's apartment, where the play and reality become conflated in his mind and he kills Pat with Othello's "kiss of death." Tony returns to Brita's house and falls asleep on her couch.

Reporter Al Cooley offers Bill front-page publicity for the play by highlighting the similarities between Pat's murder and Othello's "kiss of death." Tony is enraged when he sees the story and physically attacks Bill. However, Bill suspects that Tony is Pat's killer and reports his suspicion to the police, only to find that Pat's drunken neighbor has been arrested for her murder. Tony demands Bill's dismissal, and Bill plans a short vacation. Bill tells Brita that he loves her, but Brita does not return his feelings. However, Brita reveals to Bill that Tony left her home on the night of Pat's murder.

Bill hires an actress to dress up as Pat and plants her as a waitress in the restaurant where Pat had worked. Bill invites Tony to the restaurant, and with police captain Pete Bonner watching, Tony becomes distraught upon seeing Pat's double and rushes out of the restaurant. Suspicious now, Bill and the police follow Tony to the theater. Standing in the wings, they watch the performance and are seen there by Tony. At the climax of the performance of Othello that evening, a guilt-ridden Tony stabs himself with a real dagger at the point at which Othello does the same within the play. Backstage, bleeding from his self-inflicted wound, he confesses all and dies.

== Cast ==
- Ronald Colman as Anthony "Tony" John
- Signe Hasso as Brita
- Edmond O'Brien as Bill Friend
- Shelley Winters as Pat Kroll
- Ray Collins as Victor Donlan
- Philip Loeb as Max Lasker
- Millard Mitchell as Al Cooley
- Joe Sawyer as Pete Bonner
- Charles La Torre as Stellini
- Whit Bissell as Dr. Roland Stauffer

== Production ==
The leading role of Anthony "Tony" John had originally been slated for Laurence Olivier. Ronald Colman was initially hesitant about performing William Shakespeare on screen, so to reassure him, director George Cukor told Colman that the film would provide him with a great chance to win an Oscar (which he later won); Colman had been nominated three times in the past.

The film's working title was Imagination. After filming had wrapped, Cukor recalled the cast for four additional days of shooting.

A Double Life was the 500th film shot on the famous Universal soundstage that had been built in 1924 for The Phantom of the Opera (1925).

Miklós Rózsa's music, for which he won his second Academy Award for Best Original Score, mixes his own modern idiom with passages in the Venetian style of the 16th century. Rózsa later adopted the title Double Life for his 1982 memoir to signify the division in his career between absolute music and Hollywood film scores.

== Release ==
A Double Life premiered on Christmas Day 1947 in Hollywood as a limited roadshow engagement timed to qualify the film and its stars for Academy Award consideration.

== Reception ==
In a contemporary review for The New York Times, critic Bosley Crowther wrote: "Miss Gordon and Mr. Kanin, in collaboration with William Shakespeare, have whipped up a modern drama which thoroughly employs the screen to demonstrate the strange excitement and the deathless romance of the theatre. And by casting Ronald Colman as their matinee idol of vast renown and by giving him an opportunity to play a lot of Othello within the play, they have handed this veteran actor the role of his lengthy career. The only question is whether Mr. Colman is more spectacular as the mentally distressed star of Broadway or as the bearded Venetian Moor. In either case, he plays an actor cocked and primed for romantic tragedy."

Reviewer Philip K. Scheuer of the Los Angeles Times wrote: "It captures the pulse of the New York theater to an extraordinary degree, inherently as well as because some of it was shot there; it is adult, outspoken and subtle, and it has shaken Mr. Colman free of most of the repressions imposed upon him by years of effete grand seigniory in Hollywood. Yet much of the film is hard to follow, 'too' subtle in the sense that it does not always come off on the screen as its makers must surely have visualized it."

Bank of America repossessed the film from its producers.

== Awards ==
Award	Category	Nominee(s)	Result	Ref.
Academy Awards	Best Director	George Cukor	Nominated	
Academy Awards	Best Actor	Ronald Colman	Won	
Academy Awards	Best Original Screenplay	Ruth Gordon and Garson Kanin	Nominated	
Academy Awards	Best Scoring of a Dramatic or Comedy Picture	Miklós Rózsa	Won	
Golden Globe Awards	Best Actor in a Leading Role	Ronald Colman	Won	
Venice International Film Festival	Grand International Prize of Venice	George Cukor	Nominated	

The film was nominated by the American Film Institute for its 2005 compilation AFI's 100 Years of Film Scores.

== See also ==
- Carnival (1921)
- Carnival (1931)
