= Heartsounds =

1984 television film by Glenn Jordan

- Based on: Heartsounds: The Story of a Love and Loss by Martha Weinman Lear
- Written by: Fay Kanin
- Directed by: Glenn Jordan
- Starring: Mary Tyler Moore; James Garner
- Composer: Leonard Rosenman
- Country of origin: United States
- Original language: English

Production
- Executive producer: Norman Lear
- Producers: Fay Kanin; Fern Field
- Cinematography: Richard Ciupka
- Editor: John Wright
- Running time: 128 minutes
- Production company: Embassy Television

Original release
- Network: ABC
- Release: September 30, 1984

Heartsounds is a 1984 American drama television film directed by Glenn Jordan and written by Fay Kanin, based on the book Heartsounds: The Story of a Love and Loss by Martha Weinman Lear. It stars Mary Tyler Moore and James Garner, with Sam Wanamaker, Wendy Crewson, David Gardner, and Carl Marotte in supporting roles. Produced by Embassy Television, the film premiered on ABC on September 30, 1984, as part of the anthology series ABC Theater.

Heartsounds received three Primetime Emmy Award nominations: Outstanding Drama/Comedy Special, Outstanding Lead Actor for Garner, and Outstanding Lead Actress for Moore. The film was honored with the Peabody Award to ABC Theater, while Garner was also nominated for a Golden Globe Award for his performance.

== Plot ==
New York urologist Harold Lear gets a taste of his own medicine when he suffers a heart attack and is confronted with a medical institution which does not seem equipped to help. Wife Martha steps in to fight the system and get a measure of service and compassion. Ultimately the greatest battle is not waged against the medical profession, however, but against Lear's own failing body and his own mortal fears.

== Cast ==
- Mary Tyler Moore as Martha Weinman Lear
- James Garner as Harold Lear
- Sam Wanamaker as Moe Silverman
- Wendy Crewson as Judy
- David Gardner as Barney Knapp
- Carl Marotte as Michael
- Wayne Best as Intern / Lover
- Anthony Bishop as Proprietor
- David Bolt as Psychoanalyst
- David Clement as Dr. Bell
- Beverly Cooper as Nurse Lark
- Eve Crawford as Ruth Nathanson
- Sandy Crawley as Chief Resident
- Marvin Goldhar as Mr. Weinman
- Lynne Gorman as Mrs. Bailey
- Patricia Hamilton as Flo
- Tom Harvey as Walter Simon
- Meg Hogarth as Estelle
- Cec Linder as Dr. Lorber
- Doris Petrie as Mrs. Weinman
- Steve Petrie as Chet
- Maida Rogerson as Annie
- Michael J. Reynolds as Dr. Roberts
- Françoise Vallée as The Neurologist
- Paul Vincent as Fred, The Doorman
- Jimmy Williams as Carl (credited as Jim Williams)
- George E. Zeeman as Dr. Gross (credited as George Zeeman)

== Production ==
Veteran television producer Norman Lear, who was Harold Lear's cousin, produced the film, initially offering the lead role to Paul Newman in anticipation of a theatrical release. Uneasy about the prospect of portraying an infirm and moribund character, Newman declined to participate. Garner, however, had been in and out of hospitals from the age of five and had no reservations about accepting the role.

According to The Washington Post, author Martha Weinman Lear said: "I'm thrilled by the casting" and "I'm extremely lucky to have landed in the care of all these people… The screenplay is incredibly faithful to the spirit and substance of the book."

== Reception ==
=== Critical response ===
The New York Times' television critic John J. O'Connor wrote that "the film packs something of the wallop of a powerful and unblinking documentary" and lauded the performances of Moore and Garner. The Peabody Awards noted that "both Moore and Garner turn in captivating performances and take full advantage of a lean and emotionally powerful script."

In the wake of his "frighteningly convincing" performance, Garner was nominated for an Emmy and a Golden Globe Award, with Moore also nominated for an Emmy.

=== Accolades ===
Year	Award	Category	Recipient(s)	Result	Ref.
1985	42nd Golden Globe Awards	Best Actor in a Miniseries or Television Film	James Garner	Nominated	
1985	45th Peabody Awards		ABC	Won	
1985	1st TCA Awards	Outstanding Achievement in Movies, Miniseries and Specials	Heartsounds	Nominated	
1985	37th Primetime Emmy Awards	Outstanding Drama/Comedy Special	Norman Lear; Fay Kanin; Fern Field	Nominated	
1985	37th Primetime Emmy Awards	Outstanding Lead Actor in a Limited Series or a Special	James Garner	Nominated	
1985	37th Primetime Emmy Awards	Outstanding Lead Actress in a Limited Series or a Special	Mary Tyler Moore	Nominated	
1985	1st Artios Awards	Outstanding Achievement in Mini-Series or Movie of the Week Casting	Eve Brandstein	Nominated	
