= The Country Girl (1954 film) =

1954 film by George Seaton

- Theatrical release poster
- Directed by: George Seaton
- Screenplay by: George Seaton
- Based on: The Country Girl by Clifford Odets
- Produced by: William Perlberg
- Starring: Bing Crosby; Grace Kelly; William Holden
- Cinematography: John F. Warren
- Edited by: Ellsworth Hoagland
- Music by: Victor Young
- Production company: Perlberg-Seaton Productions
- Distributed by: Paramount Pictures
- Release dates: December 11, 1954 (Los Angeles); May 17, 1955 (United States)
- Running time: 104 minutes
- Country: United States
- Language: English
- Box office: $6.5 million (est. U.S./Canada rentals)

The Country Girl is a 1954 American drama film written and directed by George Seaton and starring Bing Crosby, Grace Kelly, and William Holden. Adapted by Seaton from Clifford Odets's 1950 play of the same name, the film is about an alcoholic has-been actor who is given one last chance to resurrect his career. The film was entered in the 1955 Cannes Film Festival.

Seaton won the Academy Award for Best Adapted Screenplay while Kelly won the Academy Award for Best Actress for her role, which previously had earned Uta Hagen her first Tony Award in the play's original Broadway production. The role was as the alcoholic actor's long-suffering wife.

== Plot ==
In a theatre, auditions are being held for a new musical production titled The Land Around Us. Director Bernie Dodd watches a number performed by fading star Frank Elgin and suggests that he be cast in the leading role. This is met with strong opposition from Philip Cook, the show's producer. However, Bernie insists on the down-on-his-luck Frank, who is living in a modest apartment with his wife Georgie.

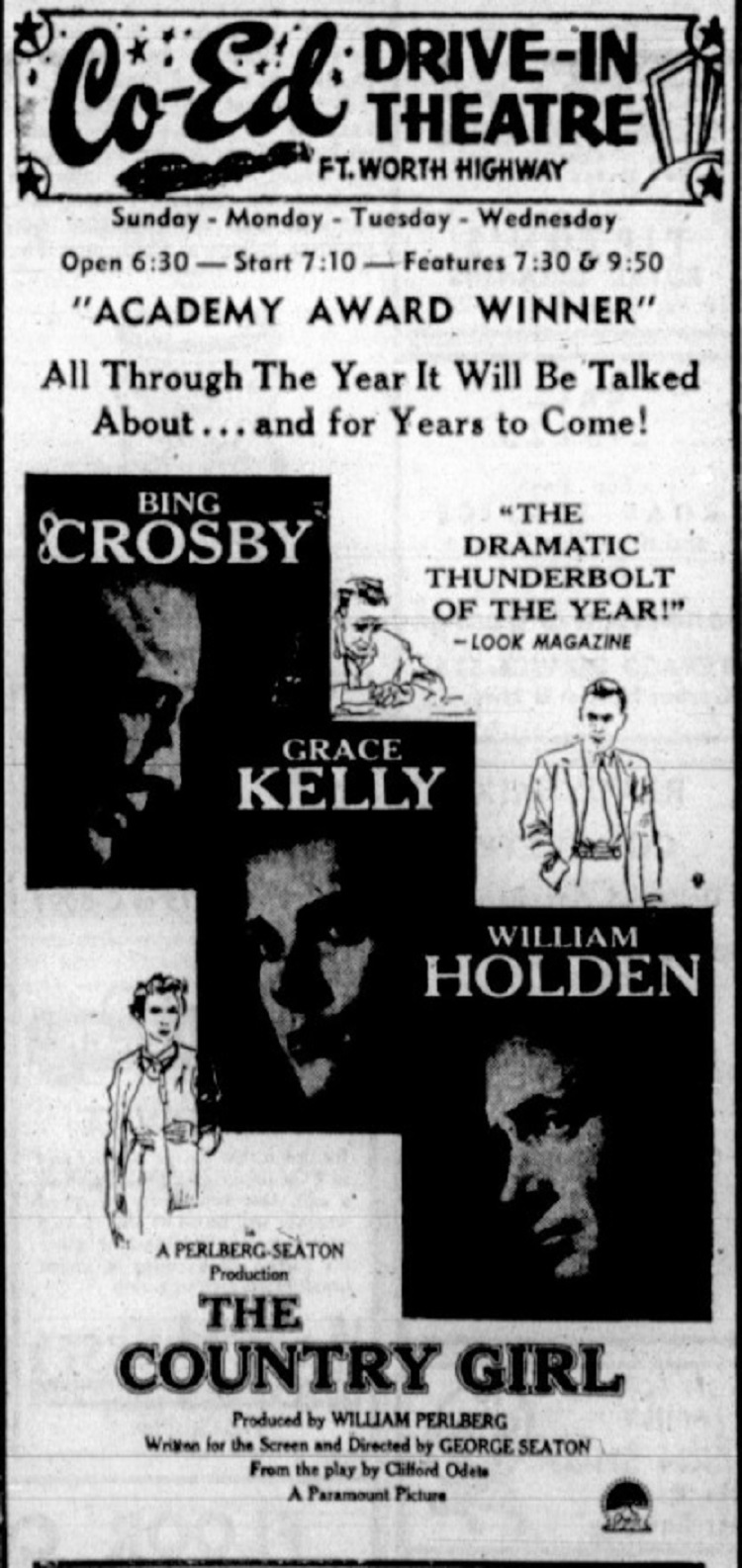
Drive-in advertisement from 1955

Frank is actually a demanding alcoholic who is completely dependent on his wife. Initially Frank leads Bernie to believe that Georgie is the reason for the decline in his career, resulting in Bernie mistakenly blaming her for everything that happens during rehearsals, including Frank's requests for a dresser and a run-of-the-show contract, first behind her back and eventually to her face. The real reason Frank's career has faltered is his insecurity. When their five-year-old son Johnny was hit by a car and died while in Frank's care, he was devastated. Bernie also believed Georgie to be suicidal and a drunk, when it is actually Frank who is both.

Humiliated when he learns the truth, Bernie realizes that behind his hatred of Georgie was a strong attraction to her, and he kisses her. She tells him that it does not mean that anything has changed.

Frank's performance is a success on opening night. Afterward, he demands respect from Cook. Previously Georgie had said that if only Frank could stand on his own two feet, she could get away from him. At a party to celebrate the play's opening, Bernie believes Georgie will be free to leave Frank and tells her that he loves her. Later, Frank tells them he has noticed their longing looks, and all three talk. Shortly after, Frank leaves the party. Georgie says goodbye to Bernie, and he tells her he appreciates a woman who is loyal. She kisses him lightly and goes to catch up with Frank.

== Cast ==
- Bing Crosby as Frank Elgin
- Grace Kelly as Georgie Elgin
- William Holden as Bernie Dodd
- Anthony Ross as Philip Cook
- Gene Reynolds as Larry
- Jacqueline Fontaine as lounge singer
- Eddie Ryder as Ed
- Robert Kent as Paul Unger
- John W. Reynolds as Henry Johnson
- Victor Young as recording studio conductor (uncredited)

== Reception ==
Filmed between February and April 1954, the film had its benefit world premiere at Criterion Theatre, New York on December 15, 1954. The Gala West Coast Premiere took place at the Stanley Warner Theatre, Wilshire Blvd. at Canon Drive, Beverly Hills, on December 21. This was a benefit for the United States Olympic Fund. The critical response was very favorable with Bosley Crowther of The New York Times writing, "The Country Girl comes along fitly as one of the fine and forceful pictures of the year." Variety summed it up with "[a]n exceptionally well performed essay on an alcoholic song man, with Bing Crosby the one carrying on a bottle romance, Country Girl is high on boxoffice punch. It's a strong, intense show that's certain to be talked about."

=== Awards and nominations ===
Award	Category	Nominee(s)	Result	Ref.
Academy Awards	Best Motion Picture	William Perlberg	Nominated	
Academy Awards	Best Director	George Seaton	Nominated	
Academy Awards	Best Actor	Bing Crosby	Nominated	
Academy Awards	Best Actress	Grace Kelly	Won	
Academy Awards	Best Screenplay	George Seaton	Won	
Academy Awards	Best Art Direction – Black-and-White	Art Direction: Hal Pereira and Roland Anderson; Set Decoration: Samuel M. Comer and Grace Gregory	Nominated	
Academy Awards	Best Cinematography – Black-and-White	John F. Warren	Nominated	
British Academy Film Awards	Best Foreign Actress	Grace Kelly	Nominated	
Cannes Film Festival	Palme d'Or	George Seaton	Nominated	
Directors Guild of America Awards	Outstanding Directorial Achievement in Motion Pictures	George Seaton	Nominated	
Golden Globe Awards	Best Actress in a Motion Picture – Drama	Grace Kelly	Won	
National Board of Review Awards	Top Ten Films		3rd Place	
National Board of Review Awards	Best Actor	Bing Crosby	Won	
National Board of Review Awards	Best Actress	Grace Kelly (also for Dial M for Murder and Rear Window)	Won	
New York Film Critics Circle Awards	Best Film		Nominated	
New York Film Critics Circle Awards	Best Director	George Seaton	Nominated	
New York Film Critics Circle Awards	Best Actress	Grace Kelly (also for Dial M for Murder and Rear Window)	Won	
Writers Guild of America Awards	Best Written American Drama	George Seaton	Nominated	

== Soundtrack ==
All the songs were written by Harold Arlen (music) and Ira Gershwin (lyrics).

- "It's Mine, It's Yours" sung by Bing Crosby
- "The Search Is Through" sung by Bing Crosby
- "The Land Around Us" sung by Bing Crosby
- "Dissertation on the State of Bliss" sung by Jacqueline Fontaine and Bing Crosby

Bing Crosby recorded four of the songs for Decca Records and these were issued on a 10-inch LP titled The Country Girl / Little Boy Lost. Crosby's songs were also included in the Bing's Hollywood series.

== In popular culture ==
Some of the dialogue from the film was used in the 2007 Mika song "Grace Kelly".

The film is referenced by name in the television series I Love Lucy in the 1955 episode "L.A. at Last" by William Holden who guest-starred in the episode.

The film is parodied in the 1955 Hancock's Half Hour radio episode “The Chef That Died of Shame".
