= Woman of the Year =

1942 film by George Stevens

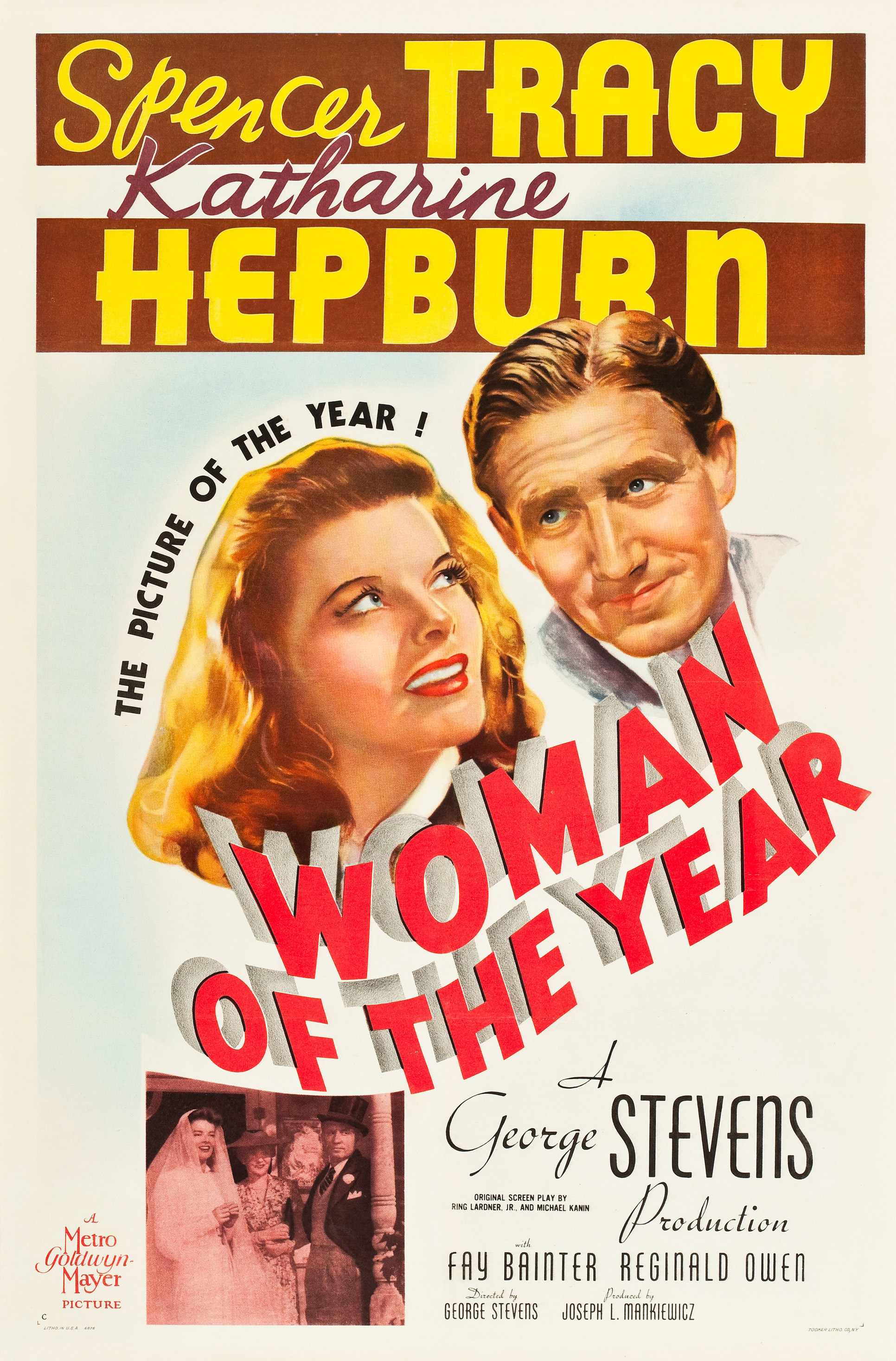
- Theatrical release poster
- Directed by: George Stevens
- Screenplay by: Ring Lardner Jr. Michael Kanin
- Produced by: Joseph L. Mankiewicz
- Starring: Spencer Tracy; Katharine Hepburn; Fay Bainter; Reginald Owen
- Cinematography: Joseph Ruttenberg
- Edited by: Frank Sullivan
- Music by: Franz Waxman
- Production company: Metro-Goldwyn-Mayer
- Distributed by: Loew's Inc.
- Release date: February 5, 1942 (New York City)
- Running time: 114 minutes
- Country: United States
- Language: English
- Budget: $1 million
- Box office: $2.7 million (initial release)

Woman of the Year is a 1942 American romantic comedy drama film directed by George Stevens and starring Spencer Tracy and Katharine Hepburn. The film was written by Ring Lardner Jr. and Michael Kanin (with uncredited work on the rewritten ending by John Lee Mahin), and produced by Joseph L. Mankiewicz. The film's plot is about the relationship between Tess Harding—an international affairs correspondent, chosen "Woman of the Year"—and Sam Craig—a sportswriter—who meet, marry, and encounter problems as a result of her unflinching commitment to her work. In 1999, Woman of the Year was deemed "culturally, historically, or aesthetically significant" by the United States Library of Congress and selected for preservation in the National Film Registry.

== Plot ==
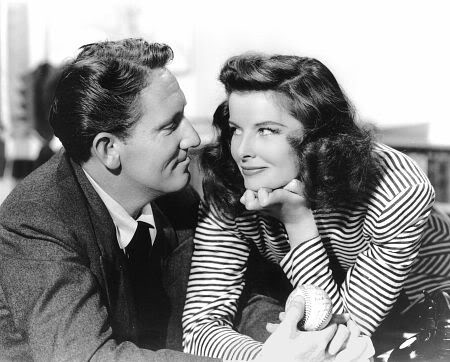
Katharine Hepburn and Spencer Tracy in Woman of the Year

Tess Harding and Sam Craig are journalists for the (fictional) New York Chronicle. Tess, the daughter of a former ambassador, is a highly educated, well-travelled political affairs columnist who speaks several languages fluently. Sam is a knowledgeable and well-informed sports writer. Their difficulties are presented as stemming from differences of class, experience and temperament, as well as from gender.

After Tess suggests on the radio that baseball be abolished for the duration of the war, Sam leaps to the sport's defense. Their editor summons them to his office: he will not stand for an intramural feud at his paper. Sam invites Tess to a baseball game at Yankee Stadium. She is unfamiliar with the rules of the sport; Sam has some difficulty explaining them. Tess invites Sam to her apartment later that night. What he thought would be a date is actually a cocktail party where the guests are discussing the world situation in foreign languages. He leaves. She sends him champagne to apologize and asks him to take her to the airport so he can kiss her goodbye. On the drive back to town, Sam hits it off with Ellen Whitcomb, Tess's aunt, who is a world-famous feminist. She advises him to "marry the girl".

Sam has his mind on a personable wedding, but it quickly escalates into a production. A justice of the peace in South Carolina is arranged by Gerald, Tess's ultra-competent secretary, to fit her schedule and that of her illustrious senator father. Their wedding night is disrupted by the arrival of a Yugoslavian statesman who has just escaped from the Nazis, and a stream of European disciples.

Conflicts large and small arise over Tess's priorities and Sam's place in her life, beginning with her decision to have Sam move into her apartment instead of them choosing a place together. Her business continually comes before her personal life, with Sam largely reduced to the role of an aide. Sensing her husband is unhappy, Tess floats the idea of having a child, which Sam is warm to until Tess reveals that she has already agreed to adopt a young Greek refugee named Chris, who speaks no English. Sam is very upset, but hides his anger from the child. Before the couple can discuss the issue, they are interrupted by the news that Tess has been named "America's Outstanding Woman of the Year".

Tess plans to leave Chris by himself while they go to the award gala, while Sam, already not keen on the gala, states his refusal to leave the boy alone. While Tess is at her gala, Sam returns the child to the orphanage; Chris is thrilled to see his friends again. Tess returns home with a following of photographers and discovers that Sam and Chris are gone. She attempts to reclaim Chris, but he refuses, preferring to stay with his friends. The next day, Tess receives a telegram from her aunt, telling the couple to come to her home in Connecticut. Sam declines to join, and opines that their marriage has neither been "perfect or a marriage". Tess comes home to learn that her aunt and father are finally to be married that night. The ceremony has all the reverence and grace that was lacking in the Craigs' wedding; Tess is moved to tears. She drives through the night and arrives at Sam's new Riverside apartment.

Allowed in by a super, Tess decides to prepare Sam breakfast while he sleeps in. She is inept in the kitchen and Sam is awakened by the clatter. Tess confesses to Sam of her recent wedding experience, and proclaims her newfound inspiration to serve only as his wife. Sam asks Tess to walk back her overbearing dedication, and to assume the role of "Tess Harding Craig" rather than just "Tess Harding" or "Mrs. Sam Craig". She agrees. Gerald appears with a champagne bottle, announcing that Tess is expected to launch a battleship. Sam takes Gerald outside and returns with the broken bottle, announcing that he has just "launched Gerald".

== Cast ==
- Spencer Tracy as Sam Craig
- Katharine Hepburn as Tess Harding
- Fay Bainter as Ellen Whitcomb
- Reginald Owen as Clayton
- Minor Watson as William J. Harding
- William Bendix as "Pinkie" Peters
- Gladys Blake as Flo Peters
- Dan Tobin as Gerald Howe
- Roscoe Karns as Phil Whittaker
- William Tannen as Ellis
- Ludwig Stössel (credited as Ludwig Stossel) as Dr. Lubbeck
- Sara Haden as Matron
- Edith Evanson as Alma
- George Kezas as Chris

== Production ==
=== Writing ===
The outline for the film was developed by Garson Kanin, a close friend of Hepburn's. The character of Tess Harding was based on Dorothy Thompson, an American journalist and radio broadcaster who was highly influential. Hepburn then passed the outline to Joseph L. Mankiewicz at MGM, and said the price was $250,000 – half for her, half for the script. He liked it and agreed to produce the movie. Kanin was fighting in the war at the time, so the script was written by his brother, Michael Kanin, and mutual friend Ring Lardner Jr. Hepburn contributed significantly to the script – reading it, suggesting cuts and word changes, and generally providing helpful enthusiasm for the project. As a part of the deal, Hepburn had the option of selecting her co-star and director (Tracy and Stevens).

=== Casting ===
Woman of the Year was the first of nine films Hepburn and Tracy made together. They met for the first time on the shoot. In the 1993 documentary Katharine Hepburn: All About Me, Hepburn herself says she was wearing high heels at the first meeting with Tracy and producer Joseph L. Mankiewicz, and said "I'm afraid I'm a bit tall for you, Mr. Tracy". Mankiewicz then responded, "Don't worry, Kate, he'll cut you down to size." It was during the filming of Woman of the Year that Hepburn and Tracy became romantically involved – a relationship that lasted until Tracy's death in 1967.

=== Reshoots ===
The film was originally shot with a different ending, but it proved unpopular at test screenings. The decision was made to change it, and the final fifteen minutes of the film were re-written and shot. In the original ending, Sam went missing after returning the child to the orphanage, while he was supposed to write an article about an upcoming boxing match. Tess decides to take over for him and visits the gym to learn about the fight. Sam, who is in a language school trying to learn French and Spanish to "be important", is shocked when he sees the article. He goes to the fight, where he encounters Tess. She insists that she did the work to be a "good wife," and states her dedication to Sam. He says that he does not want either extreme; he just wants her to be "Tess Harding Craig" (as in the released ending).

Ring Lardner Jr. describes in Archive of America Television oral history interviews (2000) that changes made to the ending of the film were against the wishes of Katharine Hepburn, and were implemented while both screenwriters were on vacation in New York. The changes were instigated by Louis B. Mayer, producer Joseph L. Mankiewicz and director George Stevens, with the actual new ending being written by John Lee Mahin (who was uncredited). In an interview, Lardner indicated that these parties all believed that Tess Harding "had to get her comeuppance for being too strong in a man's world, so they wrote a scene where she tried to fix breakfast ... and gets everything wrong." Lardner and Kanin were given some room to rewrite the new ending on returning from New York, and in the same interview Lardner recalls "some of the worst lines we rewrote, but we couldn't fix it, we couldn't change it fundamentally".

== Reception ==
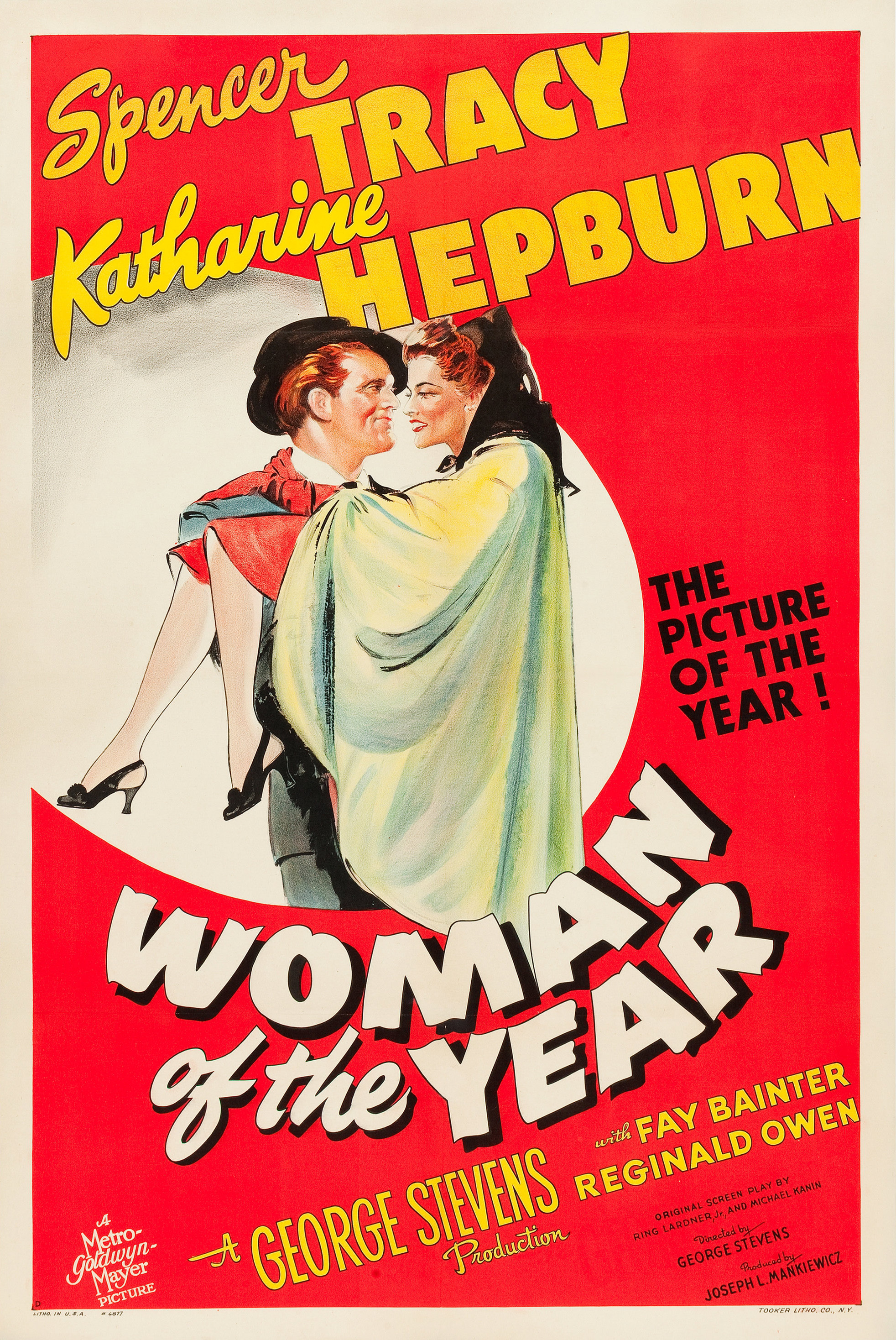
Alternate theatrical release poster

On Rotten Tomatoes Woman of the Year holds a rating of 83% from 30 reviews. The consensus states: "In the first romantic comedy pairing of Tracy and Hepburn, the stars' chemistry is off to a working start and the film's sparkling comedy smooths out any rough patches." Metacritic, which uses a weighted average, assigned the film a score of 74 out of 100, based on 11 critics, indicating "generally favorable" reviews.

=== Box office ===
The film earned $1,935,000 in the United States and Canada and $773,000 elsewhere during its initial release, making MGM a profit of $753,000.

== Awards and honors ==
At the 15th Academy Awards, Michael Kanin and Ring Lardner Jr. won the award for Best Original Screenplay, and Katharine Hepburn was nominated for Best Actress.

American Film Institute included the film in the 2000 list AFI's 100 Years...100 Laughs (#90) and in 2002, in AFI's 100 Years...100 Passions (#74).

A 1976 remake of the film, made for television and starring Joseph Bologna and Renée Taylor, was broadcast on CBS.

In 1981, the film was adapted into a successful Broadway musical of the same name, starring Lauren Bacall, who won a Tony Award for her work.

== Gallery ==
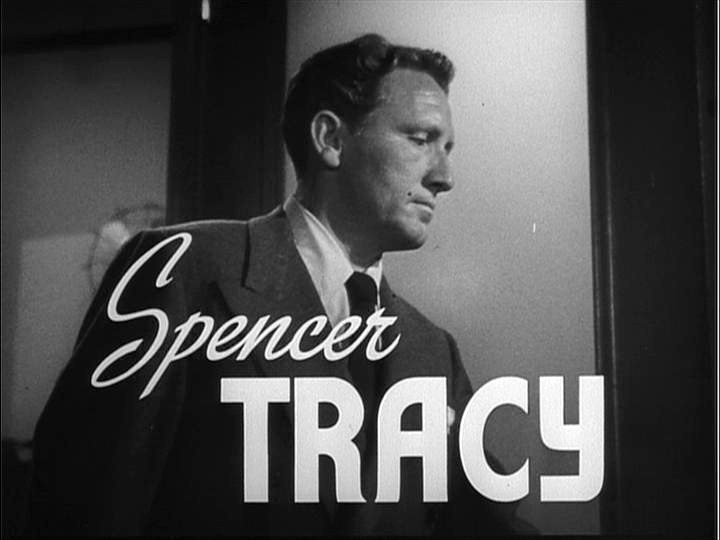

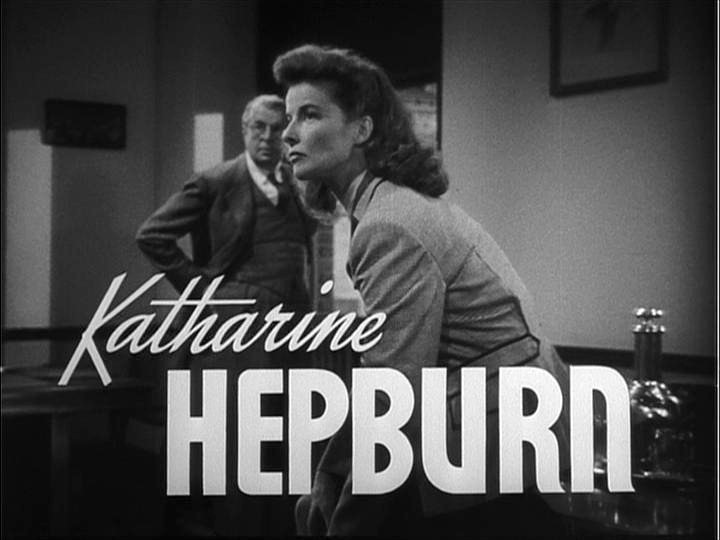

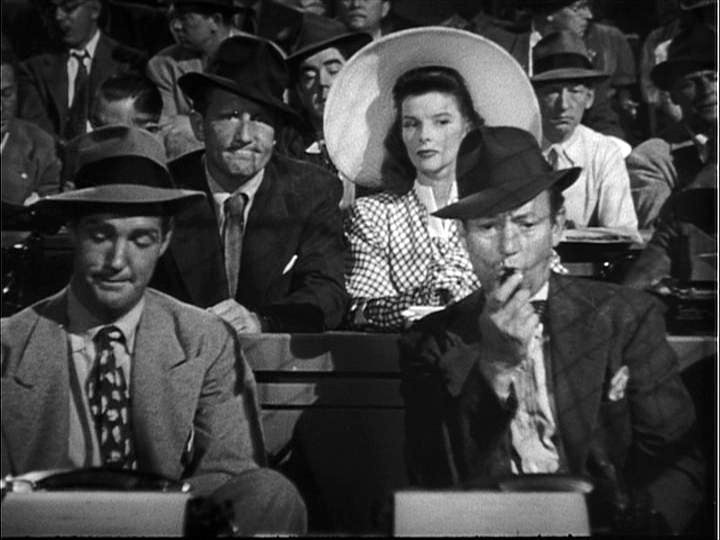
