= George Seaton =

American filmmaker, playwright and theater director (1911–1979)

- Seaton at MGM in 1937
- Born: George Edward Stenius; April 17, 1911; South Bend, Indiana, U.S.
- Died: July 28, 1979 (aged 68); Beverly Hills, California, U.S.
- Occupations: Screenwriter; playwright; film director; film producer; theatre director
- Years active: 1934–1973
- Spouse: Phyllis Loughton (m. 1936)

George Seaton (born George Edward Stenius; April 17, 1911 – July 28, 1979) was an American screenwriter, playwright, film director and producer, and theater director. Seaton led several industry organizations, serving as a three-time president of the Motion Picture Academy of Arts and Sciences, president of the Writers Guild of America West and the Screen Directors Guild, and vice president of Motion Picture Relief Fund. He won two Academy Awards for his screenplays.

== Life and career ==
=== Early life ===
Seaton was born George Edward Stenius in South Bend, Indiana, of Swedish descent, the son of Olga (Berglund) and Charles Stenius, who was a chef and restaurant manager. He was baptized as Roman Catholic. He grew up in a Detroit Jewish neighborhood, and described himself as a "Shabas goy". He went on to learn Hebrew in an Orthodox Jewish yeshiva and was even bar mitzvahed. Seaton attended Exeter Academy and was meant to go to Yale but instead auditioned for Jesse Bonstelle's drama school in Detroit. She hired him for her stock company at $15 a week.

=== Acting ===
Seaton worked in stock and on radio. He worked as an actor on radio station WXYZ. John L. Barrett played the Lone Ranger on test broadcasts of the series in early January 1933, but when the program became part of the regular schedule, Seaton was cast in the title role. In later years, he claimed to have devised the cry "Hi-yo, Silver" because he couldn't whistle for his horse as the script required.

=== Writing at MGM ===
Seaton wrote several plays, one of which was read by an executive at MGM who offered him a contract.

Seaton, with fellow writer and friend Robert Pirosh, joined Metro-Goldwyn-Mayer as a contract writer in 1933. He was credited on the scripts for Student Tour (1934) and The Winning Ticket (1935) and did some uncredited work with Robert Pirosh on A Night at the Opera (1935). Seaton's first major screen credit was the Marx Brothers comedy A Day at the Races (1937). His work on the script for Stage Door (1937) and The Wizard of Oz (1939) was uncredited. He wrote a play But Not Goodbye.

Seaton left MGM in 1937, unhappy at being restricted to comedies.

=== Columbia and 20th Century Fox ===
Seaton went to Columbia where he was credited on the scripts for The Doctor Takes a Wife (1940), This Thing Called Love (1940) and Bedtime Story (1941). At Columbia, Seaton first met William Perlberg.

In the early 1940s, Seaton joined 20th Century Fox, where he remained for the rest of the decade, writing scripts for That Night in Rio (1941) with Don Ameche and Alice Faye. For a time, he specialized in musicals and comedy: Moon Over Miami (1941), with Betty Grable and Ameche, and Charley's Aunt (1941), with Jack Benny.

Seaton co-wrote a historical war film, Ten Gentlemen from West Point (1942), then did the comedies The Magnificent Dope (1942) with Ameche and Henry Fonda, and The Meanest Man in the World (1943) with Jack Benny.

Seaton wrote The Song of Bernadette (1943), which was a big success. It was produced by William Perlberg who would have an important influence on Seaton's career. Seaton followed it with the Betty Grable musical Coney Island (1943). He also wrote The Eve of St. Mark (1944).

But Not Goodbye, Seaton's 1944 Broadway debut as a playwright, closed after only 23 performances, although it later was adapted for the 1946 MGM film The Cockeyed Miracle by Karen DeWolf.

=== Directing ===
Seaton's success as a writer paved the way for his work as a director. His first film was Diamond Horseshoe (1945) with Grable, which he also wrote. It was produced by William Perlberg, who would go on to produce all of Seaton's films. The film was very successful.

Seaton did some uncredited directing on Where Do We Go from Here? (1945) then wrote and directed Junior Miss (1945), based on a popular play, with Peggy Ann Garner.

Seaton wrote and directed The Shocking Miss Pilgrim (1947) with Grable. He followed it with Miracle on 34th Street (1947), which quickly became acknowledged as a classic. Seaton won an Oscar for his screenplay. Seaton wrote and directed the comedies Apartment for Peggy (1948) with William Holden and Jeanne Crain, and Chicken Every Sunday (1949) with Dan Dailey. He wrote a screenplay adapted from a Harry Segall play and directed For Heaven's Sake (1950) with Clifton Webb.

Seaton wrote and directed a 1950 drama about the Berlin Airlift with Montgomery Clift, The Big Lift.

=== Perlberg-Seaton productions ===
In November 1950, Seaton and Perlberg signed a multi-million dollar contract with Paramount for six years. Seaton was to write and direct films, and they would also produce films from others. They produced, but did not write or direct, the comedy Rhubarb (1951), Aaron Slick from Punkin Crick (1952), and Somebody Loves Me (1952) with Betty Hutton. Seaton's first film as writer director for Paramount was Anything Can Happen (1952), a comedy with José Ferrer.

Seaton made two films with Bing Crosby. Little Boy Lost (1953) was not a success but The Country Girl (1954), based on the play by Clifford Odets was a notable triumph. Grace Kelly earned an Oscar for Best Actress and Seaton won an Oscar for his screenplay.

Seaton and Perlberg produced The Bridges at Toko-Ri (1954), directed by Mark Robson, with Holden and Kelly. It was a huge hit.

Seaton wrote and directed The Proud and Profane (1956) with William Holden and Deborah Kerr, which was a box office disappointment. He directed a short film Williamsburg: The Story of a Patriot (1957) and produced The Tin Star (1957), directed by Anthony Mann. Seaton and Perlberg were borrowed by Paramount to direct and produce a comedy with Clark Gable and Doris Day, Teacher's Pet (1958).

In April 1958, Seaton announced he and Perlberg would produce six more films for Paramount. The first of these were But Not for Me (1959) and The Rat Race (1960), directed by Robert Mulligan. Seaton worked as director on The Pleasure of His Company (1961) with Fred Astaire and Debbie Reynolds.

He wrote and directed The Counterfeit Traitor (1962) with Holden. They intended to follow it with The Hook then Night Without End adapted by Eric Ambler from an Alistair MacLean novel.

Perlberg-Seaton Productions moved to MGM where Seaton directed Kirk Douglas in The Hook (1963), a Korean War drama. Seaton was an uncredited producer on Twilight of Honor (1963) and directed some additional scenes on Mutiny on the Bounty (1963). Seaton announced he would make a film version of the play Merrily We Roll Along, but the film was never made. Seaton wrote and directed 36 Hours (1964), a war time thriller based on a story by Roald Dahl.

=== Industry leadership ===
Seaton served as president of the Writers Guild of America West from 1948 to 1949. In 1955, he was elected president of the Academy of Motion Picture Arts and Sciences served three terms, 1955–1958.

Seaton directed the 28th Academy Awards in 1956.

In 1968, Seaton won the Valentine Davies Award "given to the Writers Guild of America West member whose contributions...have brought dignity and honor to writers everywhere."

=== Broadway ===
In May 1965, Seaton announced the end of his partnership with Perlberg. He returned to Broadway to direct Above William. (1965) He then directed the Norman Krasna play Love in E Flat, which was a critical and commercial flop. The musical Here's Love, adapted from his screenplay for Miracle on 34th Street by Meredith Willson, proved to be more successful.

=== Universal ===
Seaton went to Universal in the mid-60s where he signed a three-picture contract. The first film was the comedy What's So Bad About Feeling Good? (1968), which Seaton produced and directed as well as writing with Robert Pirosh, with whom he had cowritten A Day at the Races (1937). Seaton disliked writing, producing and directing. "It's too much work," he said.

Seaton then had the biggest hit of his career with the all-star Airport (1970), which Seaton adapted from the novel by Arthur Hailey. It was produced by Ross Hunter. Seaton's script earned him an Oscar nomination.

Seaton's last film as director was his third for Universal Showdown (1973), which he also produced. He announced he was looking for another film to make but none eventuated.

=== Personal life ===
In 1936, Seaton married Phyllis Loughton Seaton, a Broadway stage manager who became a successful acting coach and was the first female mayor of Beverly Hills in 1973. They had two children.

Seaton died of cancer in Beverly Hills, California in 1979. He had been suffering from it for two years.

Seaton's papers are in the Wisconsin Historical Society Archives, Wisconsin Center for Film and Theater Research.

== Partial filmography ==
- A Day at the Races (1937)
- The Doctor Takes a Wife (1940) (writer)
- Bedtime Story (1941) (writer only)
- The Song of Bernadette (1943)
- The Meanest Man in the World (1943)
- Junior Miss (1945)
- The Shocking Miss Pilgrim (1947)
- Miracle on 34th Street (1947)
- Apartment for Peggy (1948)
- Chicken Every Sunday (1949)
- The Big Lift (1950)
- For Heaven's Sake (1950)
- Anything Can Happen (1952)
- Little Boy Lost (1953)
- The Country Girl (1954)
- The Proud and Profane (1956)
- Williamsburg: the Story of a Patriot (1957)
- Teacher's Pet (1958)
- The Pleasure of His Company (1961)
- The Counterfeit Traitor (1962)
- The Hook (1963)
- 36 Hours (1964)
- What's So Bad About Feeling Good? (1968)
- Airport (1970)
- Showdown (1973)

Non-profit organization positions
Preceded by Charles Brackett	President of Academy of Motion Pictures, Arts and Sciences; 1955–1958	Succeeded by George Stevens
