= Goodbye, My Fancy (film) =

1951 film by Vincent Sherman

- Original theatrical poster
- Directed by: Vincent Sherman
- Screenplay by: Ivan Goff; Ben Roberts
- Based on: Goodbye, My Fancy; 1948 play by Fay Kanin
- Produced by: Henry Blanke
- Starring: Joan Crawford; Robert Young; Frank Lovejoy
- Cinematography: Ted D. McCord
- Edited by: Rudi Fehr
- Music by: Daniele Amfitheatrof
- Production company: Warner Bros. Pictures
- Distributed by: Warner Bros. Pictures
- Release date: May 30, 1951 (United States)
- Running time: 107 minutes
- Country: United States
- Language: English
- Budget: $1,312,000
- Box office: $1,358,000

Goodbye, My Fancy is a 1951 American romantic comedy film directed by Vincent Sherman, produced by Henry Blanke, distributed by Warner Bros. Pictures and starring Joan Crawford, Robert Young and Frank Lovejoy. The film is based on the 1948 play of same name written by Fay Kanin, and the story was adapted for the screen by Ivan Goff and Ben Roberts. The plot follows an influential congresswoman who returns to her former college to receive an honorary degree, only to find her old flame as the university president.

Goodbye, My Fancy was the third and final cinematic collaboration between Sherman and Crawford following Harriet Craig and The Damned Don't Cry, both released in 1950.

== Plot ==
Powerful congresswoman Agatha Reed returns to her alma mater to receive an honorary degree. However, the college's board of trustees does not know that Agatha was expelled from the school years earlier for participating in an all-night date with young professor Dr. James Merrill, who is now the university's president. The romantic fires are rekindled when they meet again. Matt Cole, a photographer from Life magazine, had been involved with Agatha overseas in World War II, but she abruptly ended the relationship. Cole believes that her feelings for Merrill are simply an unresolved holdover from her girlhood, and he follows her to the school.

Agatha becomes embroiled in a debate regarding progressive teaching methods with Dr. Pitt, board trustee Claude Griswold and his wife Ellen. A film that Agatha had commissioned about the dangers of restricting intellectual freedom is to be shown on campus to celebrate her legacy, but Griswold forces Merrill to cancel the event. Merrill will not fight Griswold, and although Merrill consents to show the film if Agatha's expulsion is not revealed, he lies to his daughter about the reason. After a series of misunderstandings, Agatha realizes that she belongs with Cole and should forget her feelings for Merrill.

== Cast ==
- Joan Crawford as Agatha Reed
- Robert Young as Dr. James Merrill
- Frank Lovejoy as Matt Cole
- Eve Arden as Miss "Woody" Woods
- Janice Rule as Virginia Merrill
- Lurene Tuttle as Ellen Griswold
- Howard St. John as Claude Griswold
- Viola Roache as Miss Shackelford
- Ellen Corby as Miss Birdshaw
- Morgan Farley as Doctor Pitt
- Virginia Gibson as Mary Nell Dodge
- John Qualen as Professor Dingley

== Production ==
Director Vincent Sherman's production ran past its allotted timeframe and budget. He received a blistering memo from studio head Jack L. Warner reading: "After talking to you on the telephone last night, Friday, I am depending on you to finish the picture by next Saturday, November 18th [1950]. As I told you, other companies are making the same type of picture in 21-28-36 days with important casts. As you know, MGM made Father's Little Dividend, with Spencer Tracy, Elizabeth Taylor and Joan Bennett in 21 days and I am sure the Director had the same problems you have had. You will just have to do this. Otherwise, we cannot stand off this type of cost and delay in making a picture. Those days are gone and no one is going to stay on the team unless they can carry the ball. Get in there and finish the picture by next Saturday or before and stop trying for perfection. No one is interested but yourself and I am sure you are not going to pay to see the picture."

Large portions of the film were shot at Occidental College in Los Angeles.

== Reception ==
In a contemporary review for The New York Times, critic Bosley Crowther wrote:

Filling the figurative footwear Madeleine Carroll so neatly occupied in Fay Kanin's play, ''Goodbye, My Fancy," Joan Crawford is working extra hard to make romance and liberalism attractive in the Warner's film version oi that play ... And when Miss Crawford makes a mighty effort to do what she obviously regards as a significant piece of performing, the atmosphere is electrically charged. At least, it is loaded with tension—or a reasonable facsimile thereof—when Miss Crawford herself is posing or parading within the camera's range. For the lady is famous1y given to striking aggressive attitudes and to carrying herself in a manner that is both formidable and cold, That is the principal misfortune of "Goodbye, My Fancy" on the screen. Miss Crawford's errant Congresswoman is as aloof and imposing as the Capitol's dome. As a liberal-minded alumna who returns to her alma mater's halls to enjoy some sentimental indulgence and runs into a nest of reaction instead, she is adamantine and frigid where she should be pliant and warm, humorless and acrimonious where she should be good-natured and sweetly riled. And that is a serious misfortune, for Mrs. Kanin's play, adapted by Ivan Goff and Ben Roberts, is not a notably sober or solemn work. Indeed, in its slickly stage-wise jumble of glib sophistication and romance, of sentiment and capsuled propaganda, it is just this side of farce. And all of the characters in it—with the exception of the heroine, perhaps—are nimble and limpid creations that might easily be taken for caricatures.

Variety wrote: "Performances are very slick, under Vincent Sherman's direction. Miss Crawford ... sustains the romantic, middle-aged congresswoman with a light touch that is excellent."

According to Warner Bros. records, the film cost $1,312,000 and earned $1,130,000 in the U.S. and $228,000 in other markets for a gross revenue of $1,358,000 and slim profit of $46,000.

== Adaptations ==
On January 14, 1952, a 60-minute radio version of the film was broadcast on Lux Radio Theatre starring Barbara Stanwyck, Robert Young and Frank Lovejoy. A second Lux Radio Theatre adaptation aired on June 28, 1954, pairing Rosalind Russell with Robert Young.

== Home media ==
Goodbye, My Fancy was released as a Region 1 DVD on March 23, 2009 by Warner Bros.
