= Goodbye, My Fancy =

Goodbye, My Fancy is a 1948 play by Fay Kanin. A comedy in three acts and four scenes, the work premiered at the Grand Theatre in London, Ontario, on October 21, 1948, for tryout performances before the production moved to Broadway in New York City. The work premiered on Broadway on November 17, 1948, at the Morosco Theatre.

The original production was staged by Sam Wanamaker and produced by Michael Kanin, Richard Aldrich, and Richard Myers. Donald Oenslager designed the production's sets and lights, and Emeline Roche designed the costumes. The cast was led by Madeleine Carroll as Agatha Reed, Bethel Leslie as Ginny Merrill, Conrad Nagel as James Merrill, Shirley Booth as Grace Woods, George Mitchell as Dr. Pitt, Lulu Mae Hubbard as Ellen Griswold, Eda Heinemann as Miss Shackleford, and Wanamaker as Matt Cole. Booth won the Tony Award for Best Featured Actress in a Play for her performance in 1949 at the 3rd Tony Awards. The play was selected as one of the best plays of 1948–1949, with an excerpted version published in The Burns Mantle Best Plays of 1948–1949.

== Adaptations ==
The play was adapted into a 1951 film of the same name starring Joan Crawford. On January 14, 1952 a 60-minute radio version of the film was broadcast on Lux Radio Theatre starring Barbara Stanwyck, Robert Young and Frank Lovejoy. A second Lux adaptation aired on June 28, 1954, this time pairing Rosalind Russell with Robert Young.
