= Garson Kanin =

American film and theatre director, playwright, screenwriter (1912–1999)

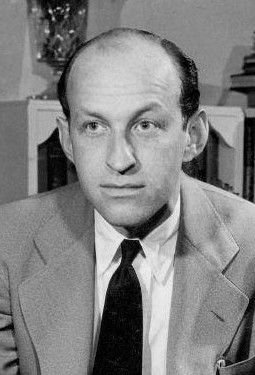
- Kanin in 1946
- Born: November 24, 1912; Rochester, New York, U.S.
- Died: March 13, 1999 (aged 86); New York City, U.S.
- Occupations: Writer, director, actor, musician
- Years active: 1933–1993
- Spouse(s): Ruth Gordon (1942–1985; her death); Marian Seldes (1990–1999; his death)
- Relatives: Michael Kanin (brother)

Garson Kanin (November 24, 1912 – March 13, 1999) was an American writer, director, actor and musician. He wrote and directed a number of plays and films and was nominated for three Academy Awards and three Tony Awards for his work.

== Early life ==
Garson Kanin was born in Rochester, New York; his Jewish family later relocated to Detroit then to New York City. He attended James Madison High School in Brooklyn, dropping out to take up a career on the theatre stage. He subsequently became a professional saxophone player and leader of his own band that went by the name Garson Kanin and His Red Hot Peppers. During this period, he attended the American Academy of Dramatic Arts pursuing an acting career.

== Career ==
=== Stage ===
Garson Kanin began his show-business career as a jazz musician, burlesque comedian, and actor. He graduated from the American Academy of Dramatic Arts in New York City and made his Broadway debut in Little Ol' Boy (1933). In 1935, Kanin was cast in a George Abbott play and soon became Abbott's assistant. Kanin made his Broadway debut as a director in 1936, at the age of 24, with Hitch Your Wagon.

In 1945, Kanin directed Spencer Tracy in Tracy's first play in 15 years. Tracy had been through a dark patch personally, culminating with a stay in hospital, and Katharine Hepburn felt that a play would help restore his focus. Tracy told a journalist in April, "I'm coming back to Broadway to see if I can still act." The play was The Rugged Path by Robert E. Sherwood, which first previewed in Providence, Rhode Island, on September 28, to a sold-out crowd and tepid response.

The Rugged Path was a difficult production, with Kanin later writing, "In the ten days prior to the New York opening, all the important relationships had deteriorated. Spencer was tense and unbending, could not, or would not, take direction". Tracy considered leaving the show before it even opened on Broadway, and lasted there just six weeks before announcing his intention to close the show. It closed on January 19, 1946, after 81 performances. Tracy later explained to a friend: "I couldn't say those goddamn lines over and over and over again every night ... At least every day is a new day for me in films ... But this thing—every day, every day, over and over again."

Kanin's 1946 play Born Yesterday, which he also directed, ran for 1,642 performances. After the draft turned in by the credited screenwriter, Albert Mannheimer, proved unworkable an uncredited Kanin was brought in by Harry Cohn to adapt his play into the script used to shoot the 1950 film adaptation. His other stage work includes directing The Diary of Anne Frank (1955), which ran for 717 performances, and the musical Funny Girl (1964), which ran for 1,348 performances. Kanin wrote and directed his last play, Peccadillo, in 1985, the same year he was inducted into the American Theater Hall of Fame.

=== Film ===
His first film as a director was A Man to Remember (1938), which The New York Times considered one of the 10 best films of 1938. Kanin was 26 at the time. His other pre-WWII directing credits include Bachelor Mother (1939), The Great Man Votes (1939), My Favorite Wife (1940), They Knew What They Wanted (1940), and Tom, Dick, and Harry (1941).

Kanin's Hollywood career was interrupted by the draft. He served in the United States Army from 1941 to 1945. During this time, Kanin and Carol Reed co-directed General Dwight D. Eisenhower's official record of the Allied invasion, the Academy Award-winning documentary The True Glory (1945). During this time, he began writing what would become regarded by many as his greatest play, Born Yesterday.

Kanin's best-remembered screenplays, however, were written in collaboration with his wife, actress Ruth Gordon. (They were married in 1942.) Together, they wrote many screenplays, including six that were directed by George Cukor. These included the Spencer Tracy - Katharine Hepburn film comedies Adam's Rib (1949) and Pat and Mike (1952), as well as A Double Life (1947), starring Ronald Colman.

=== Television ===
In the 1950s through the 1980s, Kanin adapted several of his stories and plays for television, most notably Mr. Broadway (1964), and Moviola (1980).

Kanin's best-selling novel Smash (1980), about the pre-Broadway tryout of a musical comedy, was inspired by his experience directing the 1964 musical Funny Girl and was adapted into the 2012 television series Smash.

== Personal life ==
Kanin was married to his frequent collaborator, Academy Award-winning actress Ruth Gordon from 1942 to her death in 1985. In 1990, he married stage actress Marian Seldes. Kanin died in 1999, age 86, of undisclosed causes.

=== Acquaintances and memorable sayings ===
He was a colleague of Thornton Wilder, who mentored him, and an admirer of the work of Frank Capra. Kanin said, "I'd rather be Capra than God, if there is a Capra." Kanin and Katharine Hepburn were the only witnesses to Laurence Olivier and Vivien Leigh's wedding in California on August 31, 1940. In 1941, Hepburn and he worked with his brother Michael Kanin and Ring Lardner, Jr., on the early drafts of what became Woman of the Year right before Garson enlisted in the army. He is also quoted as saying, "When your work speaks for itself, don't interrupt."

His most famous quote, from his hit play Born Yesterday, is on a New York City Public Library plaque on a 41st Street sidewalk: "I want everyone to be smart. As smart as they can be. A world of ignorant people is too dangerous to live in."

== Legacy ==
The Academy Film Archive preserved Ring of Steel and Salut a La France (French-language version) by Garson Kanin.

== Works ==
=== Novels ===
- Do Re Mi (1955)
- Blow Up a Storm (1959)
- The Rat Race (1960) (Novelization of his screenplay)
- Where It's At (1969)
- A Thousand Summers (1974)
- One Hell of an Actor (1977)
- Moviola (1979)
- Smash (1980)
- Cordelia (1982)

=== Short stories ===
- Cast of Characters: Stories of Hollywood (1969)

=== Plays ===
- Born Yesterday (1946)
- The Smile of the World (1949)
- The Rat Race (1950)
- The Live Wire (1951)
- A Gift of Time (1962)
- Come on Strong (1963)
- Speak The Speech (1980)
- Dreyfus In Rehearsal (1983)
- Peccadillo (1990)

=== Non-fiction ===
- Remembering Mr. Maugham (1966) with an introduction by Noël Coward.
- Tracy and Hepburn: An Intimate Memoir (1971) New York: Viking
- Hollywood: Stars and Starlets, Tycoons, Moviemakers, Frauds, Hopefuls, Great Lovers (1974). New York: Viking.
- It Takes a Long Time to Become Young (1978). New York: Berkley
- Together Again!: Stories of the Great Hollywood Teams (1981)

=== Musicals ===
- Fledermaus
- Do Re Mi

== Filmography ==
- A Man to Remember (1938) – director
- Next Time I Marry (1938) – director
- The Great Man Votes (1939) – director
- Bachelor Mother (1939) – director
- They Knew What They Wanted (1940) – director
- My Favorite Wife (1940) – director
- Tom, Dick and Harry (1941) – director
- Ring of Steel (short, 1942) – director
- The More the Merrier (1942) – writer
- The True Glory (1945) – director
- From This Day Forward (1946) – writer
- A Double Life (1947) – writer
- Adam's Rib (1949) – writer
- Born Yesterday (1950) - writer
- Pat and Mike (1952) – writer
- The Marrying Kind (1952) – writer
- It Should Happen to You (1954) – writer
- The Girl Can't Help It (1956) – original story
- High Time (1960) – original story
- The Rat Race (1960) – writer
- Some Kind of a Nut (1968) – writer, director
- Where It's At (1969) – writer, director

== Bibliography ==
- Curtis, James (2011). Spencer Tracy: A Biography. London: Hutchinson. ISBN 978-0-09-178524-6.
