= Michael Kanin =

American director, producer, playwright and screenwriter (1910–1993)

- Born: February 1, 1910; Rochester, New York, U.S.
- Died: March 12, 1993 (aged 83); Los Angeles, California, U.S.
- Burial place: Hollywood Forever Cemetery
- Occupations: Writer, screenwriter, film director
- Years active: 1939–1969
- Spouse(s): Fay Kanin (1940-1993; his death; 2 children)

Michael Kanin (February 1, 1910 – March 12, 1993) was an American director, producer, playwright, and screenwriter who shared an Academy Award with Ring Lardner Jr. for writing the Katharine Hepburn-Spencer Tracy film comedy Woman of the Year (1942).

Born in Rochester, New York, his first job was writing and acting in Catskills resort shows with his brother Garson Kanin. In 1939 he was signed to a screenwriting contract at RKO. He married RKO co-worker Fay Mitchell in 1940 and collaborated with her on many projects including the Broadway play Goodbye, My Fancy (1948) and the western The Outrage (1964), based on the Japanese film Rashomon (1950). The couple received an Academy Award nomination for Teacher's Pet (1958).
