= William Perlberg =

American film producer

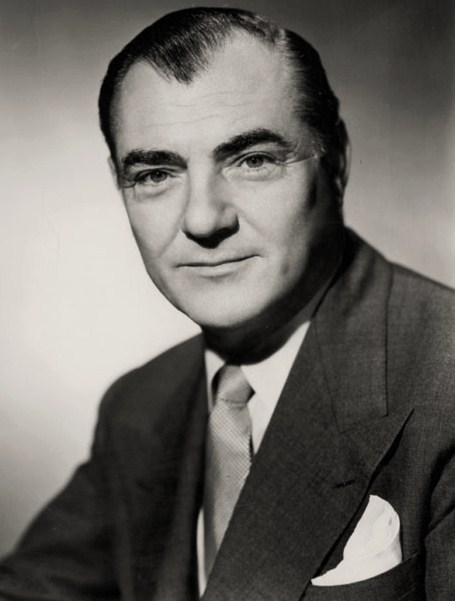

William Perlberg (October 22, 1900 in Łódź, Poland – October 31, 1968 in Los Angeles, California) was an American film producer.

William Perlberg was born Wolf Perelberg, son of Israel Jakob Perelberg (later: Perlberg), a fur manufacturer, and Tajbe Markus. Seven months after his father, he came to the U.S. on May 17, 1905, with his mother and three siblings.

Before turning to film production in 1935, he first worked as fur trader for his father, from the late 1920s as an agent for William Morris, later as a talent agent and personal assistant to Harry Cohn. During his 30-year career, Perlberg produced many box office hits for some of Hollywood's biggest studios. He worked in association with George Seaton on such films as The Song of Bernadette (1943), Miracle on 34th Street (1947), The Shocking Miss Pilgrim (1947), Chicken Every Sunday (1949) and The Country Girl (1954).

He married Josephine Brock a.k.a. Bobbe Brox, singer with the Brox Sisters, in 1928 and had a son, William Brock Perlberg (1933–2009).

== Selected filmography ==
- It's All Yours (1937)
- The Song of Bernadette (1943)
