= Retreat, Hell! =

1952 film by Joseph H. Lewis

- Original film poster
- Directed by: Joseph H. Lewis
- Screenplay by: Milton Sperling, Ted Sherdeman
- Produced by: Milton Sperling
- Starring: Frank Lovejoy; Richard Carlson; Anita Louise
- Cinematography: Warren Lynch
- Edited by: Folmar Blangsted
- Music by: William Lava
- Production company: United States Pictures
- Distributed by: Warner Bros. Pictures
- Release date: February 19, 1952 (New York City)
- Running time: 95 minutes
- Country: United States
- Language: English
- Box office: $2 million (US rentals)

Retreat, Hell! is a 1952 American war film about the 1st Marine Division in the Korean War, directed by Joseph H. Lewis. It stars Frank Lovejoy as a career Marine battalion commander who is recalled from work at an American embassy, Richard Carlson as a veteran captain and communications specialist of World War II called up from the Marine Corps Reserves, Russ Tamblyn as a seventeen-year-old private who wants to outdo his older brother, also a Marine, and Nedrick Young (credited as Ned Young). Also appearing in the film is Peter J. Ortiz, a highly decorated Marine who served in the Office of Strategic Services (OSS) and appeared in various films after retiring from the military.

== Plot ==
With the unexpected start of the Korean War, the United States scrambles to mobilize and train Marines. Capt. Paul Hansen, a reservist, is called up. A communications expert, he is puzzled and uneasy at being put in command of Baker Company by Lt. Col. Corbett, his battalion commander, but he did command a company in World War II. (Corbett has reservations about Hansen, concerned that he will play it safe in order to return to his wife and two daughters.) There is little time to train the recruits. Teenager PFC Jimmy McDermid comes from a military family (one of his brothers was killed at Iwo Jima and another is already serving in Korea) and is eager to live up to the family tradition.

In 1950, the battalion takes part in the amphibious landing at Inchon. Hansen is initially a bit too cautious for Corbett's taste, but he improves.

In his first taste of combat, McDermid knocks out a machine gun with a hand grenade. However, when he finds that his brother has been killed, he is determined to avenge him. When the unit is ambushed, McDermid destroys an enemy tank with a bazooka. Corbett makes him his driver and runner, which earns him a promotion to corporal. Corbett is disturbed by the fact that the enemy dead are Chinese, not North Koreans.

As they near the border with China, Corbett informs McDermid, as the last surviving son, that he is being sent home at his mother's request. McDermid wants to stay, but is overruled. However, before that can happen, the Chinese enter the war and launch a surprise night attack on the battalion. The unit holds, but the next day they and the rest of the United Nations forces have to begin a long, arduous retreat under frequent attack in bitter winter conditions. Hansen leads a group of volunteers into the hills to retrieve some wounded, among them McDermid. Eventually they reach the coast to be evacuated.

== Cast ==
- Frank Lovejoy as Lt. Col. Steve L. Corbett
- Richard Carlson as Capt. Paul Hansen
- Russ Tamblyn as PFC, later Cpl. Jimmy W. McDermid (as Rusty Tamblyn)
- Anita Louise as Ruth Hansen
- Nedrick Young as Sgt. Novak (as Ned Young)
- Lamont Johnson as Capt. 'Tink' O'Grady
- Robert Ellis as Shorty Devine
- Paul Smith as Andy Smith
- Peter Ortiz as Maj. Knox
- Dorothy Patrick as Eve O'Grady

== Production ==
With the United States Marine Corps's fight for life at the Battle of Chosin Reservoir against the Chinese Communist Forces offensive in the winter of 1950 being anxiously followed in the news of the day, Warner Bros. Pictures submitted a proposal on 7 December 1950 to the Marines to make a film about the events. The Marines approved the request, with former Marine Milton Sperling producing and co-writing the film for his United States Pictures division of Warners. The Marine Corps worked closely with Sperling on the script giving it their approval in August 1951 and agreeing to six weeks of filming at Camp Pendleton, where the film crew bulldozed a road and sprinkled the area with gypsum to simulate snow. The Marines also created accurate Korean villages for the film. Commandant of the Marine Corps Lemuel Shepherd estimated the value of the Marine cooperation at US$1,000,000. The Hollywood Production Code Office originally refused to approve the title because of its ban on the word "hell", but changed their mind after requests from the Marine Corps. The film was also intended to showcase the diverse background of the Americans. Richard Carlson was a Norwegian-American from Minnesota, and so his character was given the last name "Hansen" (the most common surname in Norway), and Nedrick Young's character is given the name "Sergeant Novak", with Novak being a name of West Slavic origins and Frank Lovejoy having the Anglo-Saxon name Corbett.

While the film uses fictional characters, it faithfully follows the true story of the First Marine Battalion's battles at Inchon and Seoul and is therefore ranked as one of the most realistic movies ever made about the Korean War. (Intriguingly though, at least two characters (mis)pronounce the capital of South Korea as "Sewell.")

The film also features the efforts of the United States Navy and British Royal Marines.

Director Joseph H. Lewis had been hired by Warner Brothers after the success of his film Gun Crazy but had not been given any assignment until this film. During World War II, Lewis directed United States Army training films about the M1 Garand rifle that were shown well into the 1960s.

== Reception ==
Variety called it a "top-notch war drama" for the way it balanced tense action with a more human face of the war, anticipating film-making trends that would become more common twenty years later. The film did fairly well at the box office, but was proportionately boosted due to the fact that the film was heavily promoted in some locales where a number of drive-in theaters showed it as their only option for several consecutive months. This was the case at a series of locally owned drive-in theaters in Indiana, Illinois, Michigan, Ohio and Wisconsin. As a result, in the Wisconsin counties of Polk, Barron, Price, Clark, Marinette, Oconto, Shawano, Waupaca, Dodge, and Taylor, it was the only movie one could see in a drive-in for multiple consecutive months. This was also the case in the Indiana counties of Kosciusko, Whitley, Huntington, Adams, Morgan, Jackson, and Greene and the Illinois counties of Ogle and Bureau. Following Retreat, Hell!, the same theaters showed One Minute to Zero as their only option for several more months. They would only do this once more for the movie Tarzan and the Lost Safari released in 1957.

In an oral history interview, Donald H. Eaton, a Korean War black veteran, recounts how he and several friends watched the film when it came out. Afterwards, he and half of his friends enlisted in the Marine Corps. The Korean War (1950–1953) was the first war where United States troops were desegregated, which is shown in a couple of shots throughout the film (although no speaking parts were given to African-American actors).

As indicated in the closing credit, the film relies upon substantial actual B&W combat footage which is well integrated into the staged battle sequences.

Tamblyn's performance led to an MGM contract.
