= The Guns of Will Sonnett =

American Western television series (1967–1969)

- Genre: Western
- Created by: Aaron Spelling; Richard Carr
- Written by: Ed Adamson; Harry Basch; Tony Barrett; Jameson Brewer; Richard Carr; Peter B. Germano; Cliff Gould; Kathleen Hite; James Komack; Edward J. Lakso; Robert Pirosh; Aaron Spelling; Cliff Todd
- Directed by: Jack Arnold; Thomas Carr; Irving J. Moore; Michael O'Herlihy; Richard C. Sarafian; Jud Taylor; Jean Yarbrough
- Starring: Walter Brennan; Dack Rambo
- Composers: Hugo Friedhofer; Earle Hagen; Fred Steiner
- Country of origin: United States
- Original language: English
- No. of seasons: 2
- No. of episodes: 50

Production
- Executive producer: Danny Thomas
- Producers: Aaron Spelling; Dick Clark
- Running time: 30 minutes
- Production company: Thomas-Spelling-Brenco Productions

Original release
- Network: ABC
- Release: September 8, 1967 – September 16, 1969

The Guns of Will Sonnett is an American Western television series set in the 1870s that was broadcast in color on the ABC television network from 1967 to 1969. The series, which began with the working title, "Two Rode West", was the first production collaboration between Aaron Spelling and Danny Thomas, who would later go on to produce The Mod Squad. The series is distributed by CBS Television Distribution (under the moniker KWP Studios) and, when telecast, is usually seen in tandem with another 1960s short-lived Western series, the Mark Goodson-Bill Todman production Branded; King World was previously responsible for distributing both shows.

It was filmed on location at various sites near Los Angeles, including Wildwood Regional Park in Thousand Oaks, California.

The series is noted for containing Jack Nicholson's final appearance in episodic television.

== Synopsis ==
The series starred veteran character actor Walter Brennan as Will Sonnett, and Dack Rambo as his grandson, Jeff, who were searching for Will's son, James. Disgusted with his father's absence due to army business, James had disappeared at the age of seventeen. A few years later, a baby boy was delivered to Will, with a letter identifying him as James' son and explaining that the mother had died in childbirth. The letter also said that James was giving his father a second chance at being a parent. Will was grateful for the opportunity, and did his best to steer his grandson in the right direction.

The elder Sonnett was capable with firearms and often spoke to strangers about this in an intimidating way. In the first episode, he mentions that his son is an expert with guns, and his grandson is better, "and I'm better than both of 'em – no brag, just fact." This last phrase was uttered frequently on the show, and became a catch phrase among the show's fans.

Will was not completely absent from James' childhood, and he had taught James how to handle a six-shooter; the younger man became renowned as a peerless gunfighter. Hearing so much of his father's repute, Jeff decided to find him. Will agreed, and they rode across the West looking for James. They often arrived at places that James had recently left, where the people they met had mixed opinions of James. Some saw him as a ruthless killer, while others viewed him as the only man brave enough to take the side of justice against men far more ruthless.

James, played by Jason Evers, appeared in a total of fourteen episodes. Sometimes he was seen only fleetingly, or in a flashback or dream sequence; sometimes he had a more substantial role. Although the Sonnets would come close to actually reuniting with James on several occasions, fate and circumstance would conspire to keep them apart until the very end of the series run.

The main characters achieved the goal of the premise in the final episode, when Will and Jeff located James. The three men became lawmen in a small town: Will as town marshal and the other two as his deputies.

The Guns of Will Sonnett aired two years after the cancellation of Brennan's 1964-1965 ABC series The Tycoon.

== Cast ==
=== Main ===
- Walter Brennan as Will Sonnett
- Dack Rambo as Jeff Sonnett, adult grandson of Will and son of James

In the season one episode The Favor, Will Sonnett is described by a former trading post merchant as having worked over 20 years earlier at Fort Turney as "one of the greatest scouts the Army ever had."

=== Recurring characters ===
- Jason Evers as James Sonnett, also referred to as Jim Sonnett, both in episode dialogue and the opening narration: "We search for a man named Jim Sonnett."

=== Guest stars ===
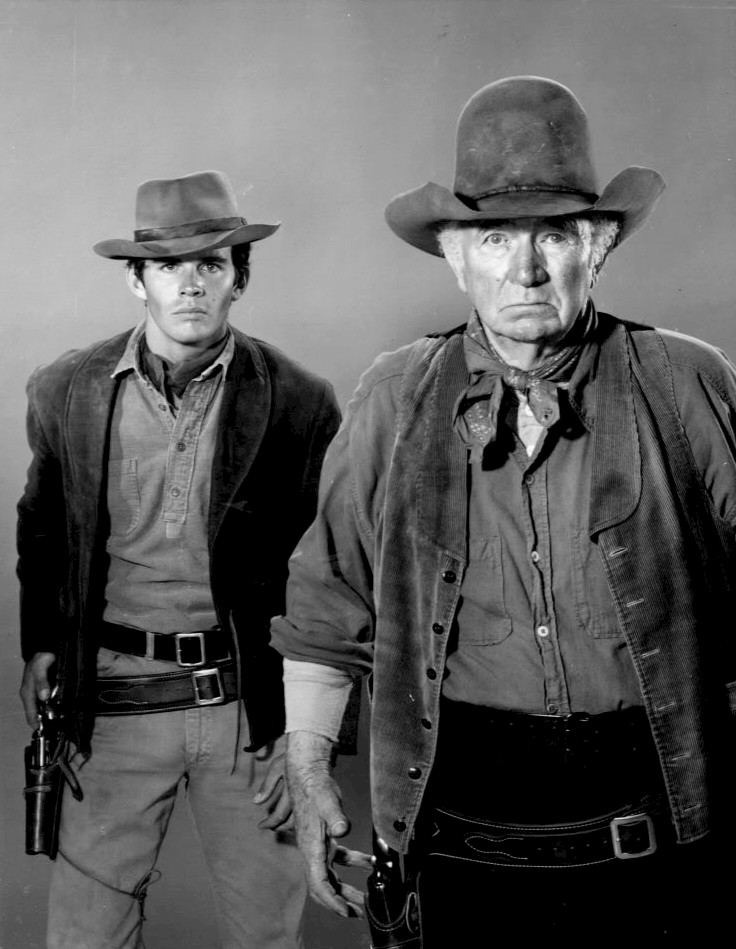
Dack Rambo and Walter Brennan, stars of The Guns of Will Sonnett.

Guest performers included future Academy Award winners Cloris Leachman and Jack Nicholson and three past and future Academy Award nominees Joan Blondell, Ellen Corby (1949), and Dennis Hopper.

- Claude Akins (two episodes)
- Edward Andrews
- R. G. Armstrong
- James Best (two episodes)
- Joan Blondell
- J. D. Cannon
- Ahna Capri
- Anthony Caruso
- James Chandler
- Lonny Chapman
- Ellen Corby
- Royal Dano (two episodes)
- Jim Davis
- Don Dubbins
- Jack Elam
- Jane Elliot
- Virginia Gregg
- Charles Grodin
- Kevin Hagen
- Myron Healey (two episodes)
- Rex Holman (four episodes)
- Bo Hopkins (two episodes)
- Dennis Hopper
- Henry Jones
- Cloris Leachman
- Nora Marlowe
- Strother Martin (two episodes)
- Sean McClory (two episodes)
- Rod McGaughy
- John Milford
- Greg Mullavey
- Jack Nicholson
- Jay Novello
- Robert Pine
- Judson Pratt
- Denver Pyle
- Ford Rainey
- Madlyn Rhue
- Bing Russell (four episodes)
- William Schallert
- Jacqueline Scott
- William Smith (three episodes)
- Harry Dean Stanton
- Karl Swenson
- Dub Taylor (two episodes)
- Arthur Tovey
- Joan Van Ark
- James Wainwright (two episodes)
- Jess Walton (first credited acting role)
- Mills Watson
- Robert J. Wilke (two episodes)

== Production ==
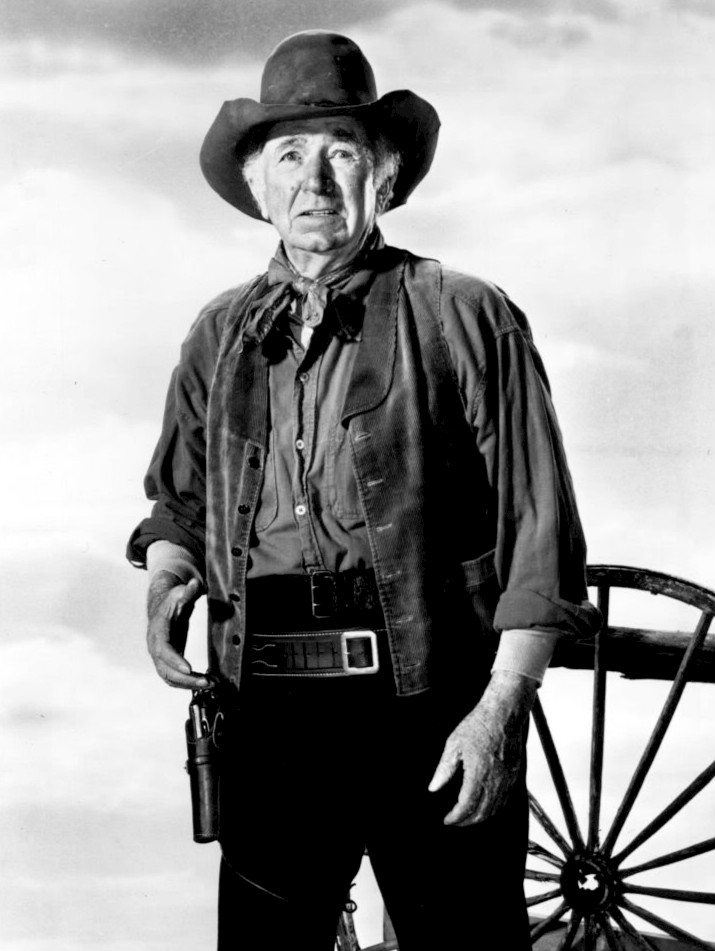
Walter Brennan in a publicity photo for The Guns of Will Sonnett.

=== Development ===
The series was created by Richard Carr (as Dick Carr) and Aaron Spelling. Carr also wrote numerous episodes. Spelling was producer, Danny Thomas executive producer and Andrew Brennan, Walter's son, was associate producer. The onscreen closing credit describes it as a "Thomas-Spelling-Brenco Production."

Carr adapted the character of Will Sonnett from the lead character he created over a decade earlier for a stand-alone episode of the half-hour 1950s anthology TV series Four Star Playhouse. In the November 3, 1955 episode A Spray of Bullets, story and screenplay by Carr, actor Dick Powell plays "Will Sonnett," an aging, recently retired sheriff with a reputation for a fast draw but now with distance vision problems who visits a town in need of glasses from an eye doctor and is eventually called out in a blurry street duel with a gunfighter who has learned of his poor eyesight and wants to increase his own fame by killing the famous Sonnett. The gunfighter is played by Robert J. Wilke, who would later play villains in two The Guns of Will Sonnett episodes: The Hero and Meeting in a Small Town. A recurring theme in both productions is that the name "Sonnett" is considered famous, as when Powell's Sonnett rides into town in the opening, signs in at a hotel, and the clerk (or a bystander in other instances in the later series) instantly recognizes the name Sonnett, a scene used a number of times in the series, including its first episode.

The series was filmed at Desilu Studios (later renamed Paramount Studios) and on-location wilderness exteriors. Several episodes featured cave exteriors and interiors, which were filmed at Bronson Canyon in Los Angeles.

The accordion-and-guitar combo opening theme music was composed by Earle Hagen and Hugo Friedhofer.

== Episodes ==
=== Season 1 (1967–68) ===
No.	Title	Directed by	Written by	Original release date
1	"Ride the Long Trail"	Bernard L. Kowalski	Dick Carr	September 8, 1967
A man who lost his left arm in a gunfight with Jim Sonnett seeks revenge when he learns Jim's son Jeff and father Will are in town. In this debut episode, Will says his catchphrase "No brag, just fact" for the first time. Guest actors: Claude Akins, Paul Fix, J. Pat O'Malley, Rex Holman.
2	"A Bell for Jeff Sonnett"	Jean Yarborough	Cliff Gould	September 15, 1967
An overly self-confident local young gunfighter wants to add another bell to his holster by killing the son of the famous Jim Sonnett, an act which he hopes will bring him face to face with the latter and a chance to increase his fame. Guest actors: Charles Grodin, Ford Rainey, Paul Wexler, Rayford Barnes.
3	"A Grave for James Sonnett"	Jean Yarborough	Edward J. Lakso	September 22, 1967
After stopping a bandito robbery on the roadway, the Sonnetts enter a Mexican town and are saddened when a padre and townspeople show them a grave marked "James Sonnett 1833–1872," but all is not what it seems and a climactic gunfight ensues when the bandito rides into town. Guest actors: Don Diamond, Jay Novello.
4	"The Natural Way"	Thomas Carr	Dick Carr	September 29, 1967
Will and Jeff are temporarily made deputy sheriffs in the town of Samson by the mayor and an injured and aging sheriff friend of Will's so that they can fend off a troublemaking cattleman and his men who are due to ride into town. Guest actors: Wendell Corey, Bartlett Robinson, Myron Healey, Charla Doherty, Hal Baylor, Jerry Catron.
5	"Of Lasting Summers and Jim Sonnett"	Richard C. Sarafian	Dick Carr	October 6, 1967
A man in jail facing a certain hanging tries to convince Will and Jeff that he is their long lost family member Jim Sonnett, but Will, who though he hasn't seen his son since he was a teenager, is very skeptical, and Jeff, never having seen his father, believes the man and wants to save him from his upcoming fatal meeting with the rope. Guest actors: Paul Richards, Peter Whitney, James Anderson, Michael Carr, Bill Erwin.
6	"Message At Noon"	Richard C. Sarafian	Dick Carr	October 13, 1967
Will and Jeff meet a town sheriff who is friendly to their search for Jim and has information about his whereabouts. Meanwhile, Jim Sonnett makes his first appearance in the series when he stops for a meal in an empty saloon in a dusty town and has an extended conversation with a bartender as a gunfighter and his accomplice wait outside for a chance at a gunfight, a wish they get. Guest actors: Jason Evers, Strother Martin, Sam Melville, Owen Bush, Michael Greene, Lonny Chapman, Bob Hoy.
7	"A Son for a Son"	Richard C. Sarafian	Dick Carr	October 20, 1967
Jeff is sick with a fever and he and Will are helped by a farmer, who, unknown to them, had a son was killed by Jim in a fair gunfight awhile ago, and whose delusional wife now believes Jeff is her son who died. Guest actors: Royal Dano, Jack Elam, Virginia Gregg, Byron Foulger, Jack Nicholson, Sandy McPeak, Bing Russell.
8	"Meeting at Devil's Fork"	Irving J. Moore	Clyde Ware	October 27, 1967
A group of men pretending to be friends of Jim trick the Sonnetts into riding with them to meet Jim at an outdoor location, but their motive is to ambush Jim instead and use Will and Jeff as bait. Guest actors: James Best, Harry Dean Stanton, Bill Coontz, Arthur Peterson, Claudia Bryar, Janice Yarbrough, Tom Reese, Jason Evers (cameo).
9	"First Love"	Jean Yarborough	Dick Carr	November 3, 1967
A rich beautiful girl whose father founded the town and most of its businesses and the hotel the Sonnetts attempt to register at, pays the fine to get Will and Jeff out of jail for a fight that happened involving Jeff in the lobby, after which she actively pursues a romantic relationship with Jeff, but her motives may not be of an amorous nature. Guest actors: Cherie Latimer, James Westmoreland, Hank Patterson, Harry Harvey, Pitt Herbert (it).
10	"The Favor"	Jean Yarborough	Dick Carr	November 10, 1967
In a deserted town, Will and Jeff come upon an injured outlaw who asks them a favor, to turn him in and send the reward money to his wife and daughter in Kansas City, family he hasn't seen for a long time. Meanwhile, a trio of bounty hunters are nearby and intend to collect the reward money for the outlaw themselves. Guest actors: Stephen McNally, Tom Tully, William Smith, Bruce Glover, Jonathan Hole.
11	"Ride the Man Down"	Jud Taylor	Harry Basch	November 17, 1967
Will and Jeff join a drunken sheriff's posse after witnessing a dying bank robber lying in the street name to the sheriff Jim Sonnett as his partner who fled the scene on horseback. With a teller having been killed in the robbery, the bank is offering a $500 reward to the man who kills Jim Sonnet and there is an unusual circumstance: the sheriff once rode with Jim. Guest actors: Kevin McCarthy, Vaughn Taylor, Charlie Briggs, Don Wilbanks, Chuck Horne.
12	"The Turkey Shoot"	Thomas Carr	Cliff Todd	November 24, 1967
Down to their last 55 cents, Will enters Jeff in a town's annual sharpshooting contest with an admission fee of 50 cents and the prize a breeding bull worth over a hundred dollars put up by a local cattleman. Every year the cattleman's son wins except this year, which stirs feelings of revenge in the son. This episode originally aired the day after the Thanksgiving holiday in the United States and despite the title no turkeys are shot in the story. Guest actors: R.G. Armstrong, David Macklin.
13	"And a Killing Rode Into Town"	Jean Yarborough	Arthur Dales (aka Howard Dimsdale)	December 1, 1967
Will and Jeff register at a hotel and are startled when the clerk tells them that Mrs. Sonnett, the wife of Jim, checked in at the same hotel less than an hour earlier, a woman who soon knocks on their hotel room door and explains where she has been for the past 20 years. Will is skeptical, but Jeff believes her story that she is his mother, including her claim that Jim is dead. Guest actors: Cloris Leachman, James Wainwright, Jack Williams, Eddie Quillan.
14	"Find a Sonnett, Kill a Sonnett"	Jean Yarborough	Larry Gordon	December 8, 1967
Will attempts to sober up a former famous gunfighter so that he can help him free Jeff, who has been taken hostage by the two sons of a man killed by Jim Sonnett and who want to trade Jeff for Jim so that they can kill him. Guest actors: J.D. Cannon, Dennis Hopper, Rex Holman, Jim Boles, Robert Karnes, James McCallion (de).
15	"Sunday in Paradise"	Jean Yarborough	Kathleen Hite	December 15, 1967
Will and Jeff ride to the town of Paradise, where Will has happy memories and where he helps an old female acquaintance who owns a brothel convince the town elders to build a church, which they are reluctant to be involved in because of her reputation, but at the same time they secretly owe her money. This episode originally aired during the Christmas season. Guest actors: Joan Blondell, Ed Bakey, Jonathan Hole, Norman Leavitt (it), Robert Foulk.
16	"The Secret of Hangtown Mine"	Christian Nyby	Tony Barrett	December 22, 1967
As they wait for a doctor to return from out of town who recently treated Jim for a knife wound, Will and Jeff accept the invitation from his wife to stay and work at their small ranch, unaware that she and a ranch hand are hiding a secret. Guest actors: Jean Willes, Norman Alden, Sam Gilman (fr).
17	"The Hero"	Thomas Carr	Dick Carr	December 29, 1967
A sheriff reluctantly allows Jeff to accompany him into Indian territory in search of a bank robber who, during the holdup, also shot Will. Meanwhile, the sheriff's long-suffering wife takes care of the bedridden Will and eventually reveals to him that her husband was in on the robbery and Jeff is in danger. Guest actors: Robert J. Wilke, Patricia Barry, Dennis Cross, William Fawcett (it), Pepe Callahan.
18	"What's in a Name?"	Jean Yarborough	Dick Carr	January 5, 1968
A former medicine wagon owner and trick shooter fools a town into thinking that he is the famous Jim Sonnett, now retired. When Will and Jeff confront him, they learn that he once helped the real Jim Sonnett five years earlier and then decide to help him when a gunslinger challenges him to a gunfight, one in which his trick-shooting skills come in handy. Jim Sonnett appears in an oncamera photograph with the trick shooter taken specially for this story and is the first time Jeff sees what his father looks like, apart from drawings on wanted posters. Guest actors: Edward Andrews, Chubby Johnson, Harry Swoger, Bo Hopkins, Larry Gordon, Ross Hagen, Jason Evers (uncredited photograph cameo).
19	"End of the Rope"	Jean Yarborough	Dick Carr	January 12, 1968
Jim Sonnett is in jail and to be hanged for murdering a rancher. When Will and Jeff learn of this, they ride to the town where he is being held and, keeping their identities a secret so as not to rile the townspeople, Will sets out to learn the truth. Jeff has his first face-to-face meeting with his father when the latter calls out to him on the street from his jail window and asks him to get a newspaper. Not wanting to alert the armed guard standing outside that he is also a Sonnett, Jeff complies without identifying himself to his father, who last saw him as an infant. While Jim successfully escapes jail, Will and Jeff learn the real killer's identity and bring it to the sheriff and judge to clear Jim of the crime. Guest actors: Jason Evers, Don Haggerty, William Smith, Joe Higgins, Perry Cook, Don Keefer, Phil Chambers, Michael Hinn, Richard Devon.
20	"And He Shall Lead the Children"	Jean Yarborough	Edward J. Lakso	January 19, 1968
At an isolated homestead, Will and Jeff tend to an elderly bedridden woman, a former girlfriend of Will's from his younger days, who is sick with mountain fever. The woman is now married to an outlaw who is set to return soon. Her three children, especially an older and armed protective son, are wary of their presence. She recovers and must make a decision to stay or leave with her two youngest children when her husband and his gang returns and poses a threat to Will and Jeff. Guest actors: Ann Doran, Solomon Sturges, Bert Freed, Bing Russell, Chuck Horne, female child (uncredited).
21	"Look For the Hound Dog"	Michael O'Herlihy	James Komack	January 26, 1968
Jeff enters a store to buy supplies and discovers the shop owner shot dead in the back room. Accused of his murder, Jeff is arrested and put on trial. Without any lawyer willing to defend him, Will takes the case and with time running out, hopes an old friend will arrive in court with forensic science evidence that will clear Jeff of the crime. Guest actors: William Schallert, Robert Donner, Dub Taylor, Laurie Main, E. J. André, William Phipps, John Alderson.
22	"Stopover in a Troubled Town"	Thomas Carr	Robert Pirosh	February 2, 1968
Will and Jeff help a struggling single mother who works in a saloon to try to reconnect with her father who is due to arrive soon for a visit. Guest actors: Ahna Capri, Karl Swenson, William Bryant, Jason Wingreen, Bill Quinn, John Cliff (it).
23	"Alone"	Michael O'Herlihy	Dick Carr	February 9, 1968
While waiting to meet up with Jeff in a windy, darkened ghost town, Will is grazed by a bullet from a sniper and begins experiencing hallucinatory visions from his past, including an imagined visit by his son Jim. Guest actors: Jason Evers, Noam Pitlik, Patrick Horgan, John Alderman, Pepper Martin.
24	"The Sins of the Father"	Jean Yarborough	Kathleen Hite	February 23, 1968
Will and Jeff stay at the home of a prosperous European immigrant family where Jim Sonnett once stayed while wounded. Jeff is shocked to learn that the infant son of the daughter is claimed to be Jim's, meaning if true he has a half-brother, and the child is also named James Sonnett. The scandalous situation has caused a rift between the daughter and her high-moraled father because Jim left without marrying the girl, the latter who it turns out is hiding the secret of the real father's identity. Guest actors: Torin Thatcher, Annette Andre, Greg Mullavey, Don Knight, Robert Pickering.
25	"The Warriors"	Jean Yarborough	Dick Carr	March 1, 1968
An Army captain asks Will, who is a former Army scout, to go undercover and help locate the guns an unlawful arms merchant plans to sell to a renegade Indian chief who plans to start a war. Will is acquainted with both, but only the chief is considered a friend. Guest actors: Jim Davis, Denver Pyle, Richard Webb, Gene Shane, Jerry Catron, Chuck Horne, Anthony Caruso.
26	"A Fool and His Money"	Jean Yarborough	Robert Pirosh	March 8, 1968
An old Army friend of Will's who saved Jim Sonnett's life when the boy was eight years old and lost in the wilderness pretends to have struck it rich and asks Will and Jeff to help him carry on his ruse when his girlfriend arrives from back east, a love interest with whom he has only exchanged letters. The pretense is to continue at least until he tells her the truth. In the meantime, two of the man's past gold-prospecting partners learn of his alleged wealth and want their share of his fortune. Guest actors: Paul Brinegar, Heather Angel, Nina Shipman, Walter Burke, Hal Baylor.

=== Season 2 (1968–69) ===
No.	Title	Directed by	Written by	Original release date
27	"Reunion"	Jean Yarborough	Dick Carr	September 27, 1968
A young man about Jeff's age, and whose brother was killed by Jim Sonnett in a fair gunfight some time ago, catches up with Jim in a saloon and pretends to be his long lost son Jeff with the intention of killing the famous Sonnett in revenge at an opportune moment. Some distance away, the real Jeff and Will ride to warn Jim of the deception. Guest actors: Jason Evers, Tim O'Kelly, Norman Leavitt (it), Chubby Johnson.
28	"The Trap"	Jack Arnold	Jameson Brewer	October 4, 1968
Crooked townspeople, including the sheriff, are in on a sham impromptu trial where the judge, who is also the blacksmith and stable owner, sentences Will and Jeff to join a grueling prison work camp gang building a railroad tunnel with other innocent victims who were just passing through town while they pocket the money they were given by the railroad to build it. Guest actors: Royal Dano, Robert DoQui, Walter Burke, Arthur Malet, Warren Finnerty, Robert Foulk, Lee de Broux.
29	"Chapter and Verse"	Jean Yarborough	Cliff Gould	October 11, 1968
Will and Jeff cross paths with a black-suited, Bible verse-spouting preacher whose main line of work is bounty hunting with an accomplice and who now has a new target by way of an out-of-date poster... "Wanted: James Sonnett, $1000, dead or alive." Guest actors: Henry Jones, Rex Holman, William Benedict, Don Haggerty, William Phipps.
30	"Pariah"	Jean Yarborough	Larry Gordon	October 18, 1968
Will and Jeff stop outside of a town to see husband and wife friends of Will's whom he hasn't seen in 15 years and learns the elderly man and his wife are being shunned and harassed by the community because Jim visited two months earlier and got into a fatal gunfight with a street tough, during which a stray bullet from the thug hit and later killed a 12-year-old girl. With Jim gone and the thug dead, the father of the girl and townspeople are taking their anger out on the Sonnett's friends. Guest actors: Paul Fix, Ellen Corby, Dennis Cross (it), Harry Harvey, Harry Lauter.
31	"Joby"	Jean Yarborough	Cliff Todd	November 1, 1968
Joby, a saloon worker who enjoys being a gossip and teller of tall tales, witnesses a gunfight he instigated between Jim Sonnett and another man. Later he meets Will and Jeff eating in his saloon and, learning their identities, attempts to arrange another gunfight, this time with the Sonnetts and the dead man's two partners, leading to a twist ending. Guest actors: Jason Evers, Strother Martin, David McLean, Paul Sorensen, Roy Engel, Robin Raymond, Sam Edwards.
32	"The Straw Man"	Jean Yarborough	Ed Adamson & Dick Carr	November 8, 1968
A respected widow in black asserts to Will and Jeff that Jim Sonnett robbed her gambler husband and shot him in the back five months earlier and in response the town tried Sonnett in absentia, found him guilty, and hung a straw dummy of him in effigy. Will sets out to clear Jim's name. Guest actors: Madlyn Rhue, Clancy Cooper, Mason Curry, Troy Melton, Walter Burke.
33	"A Difference of Opinion"	Jean Yarborough	Dick Carr	November 15, 1968
In Pleasant City, a crooked sheriff and his deputy extort businesses for protection money demanding a cut of all business transactions. Will and Jeff take an interest after it is claimed the two ran "cowardly" Jim Sonnett, who was working as the former sheriff, out of town. This episode, along with the first season episode The Natural Way, establishes that all three Sonnetts worked as law enforcement officers at one time, a plot aspect of the series finale. Guest actors: Lonny Chapman, James Wainwright, Myron Healey, Tom Fadden, James McCallion (de), Eddie Quillan.
34	"Home Free"	Jack Arnold, Jean Yarborough (uncredited)	Kathleen Hite	November 22, 1968
Will tries to convince an old friend who runs a store to forgive a former employee who served time in prison for stealing from him, something he did out of necessity, not greed. The young man is desperate to find a job to support his wife and young daughter and other business owners are rejecting him. This family-oriented episode originally aired the Friday before the Thanksgiving holiday in the United States. Guest actors: Malcolm Atterbury, Richard Evans, Hal Baylor, Victoria Thompson, Jonathan Hole.
35	"Guilt"	Jean Yarborough	Henry Rosenbaum	November 29, 1968
Three brothers, a dimwitted one of whom believes he killed and buried Jim Sonnett three months ago during an ambush robbery, think the Sonnetts are in town to avenge Jim's death, so being their family way to back each other up, they plan to have a pre-emptive showdown with Will and Jeff. Guest actors: Bo Hopkins, Larry D. Mann, Robert Donner, Charlie Briggs, Robert Karnes, Don Wilbanks, Duane Grey (it).
36	"Meeting In A Small Town"	Jean Yarborough	Edward J. Lakso	December 6, 1968
At their campsite at night, Jeff awakens from a terrifying precognitive dream in which he had a vision of his father shot by a gunman with a rifle hiding in a church's bell tower in a small Mexican town. Will is skeptical, but Jeff is determined to stop the psychic power vision from coming true. Guest actors: Jason Evers, Robert J. Wilke, Nora Marlowe, Ford Rainey.
37	"The Fearless Man"	Jean Yarborough	Kathleen Hite	December 13, 1968
Out on a mountain trail, three horse thieves ambush Will and Jeff and Will falls off his horse and is injured. Suddenly, a fearless, well-dressed stranger with a calm voice appears and saves them from further harm, but the man's bravery hides his real motivation for wanting to take part in dangerous situations and he doesn't want Jeff to idolize him as a hero. Guest actors: Paul Richards, Bing Russell, Mills Watson, Harry Pugh, William Smith.
38	"Where There's Hope"	Jean Yarborough	Kathleen Hite	December 20, 1968
Will and Jeff bury a man whose body they found in the ruins of a still-burning cabin. A little blonde-haired girl named Hope appears from the trees and bushes and explains the man was her drunken father and the fire was accidental. She takes them to the grave of her mother and Will and Jeff realize she is now an orphan and try with difficulty to find a home for her among the town's residents. This family-oriented episode with a happy ending originally aired five days before Christmas. Guest actors: Cindy Eilbacher (Hope), Jim Boles, Lillian Bronson, Jean Howell, Jane Elliot.
39	"Join the Army"	Jean Yarborough	Kathleen Hite	January 3, 1969
A friendly young man rides with the Sonnetts for awhile on his way to join the Army, but in town he is lured away by a wealth-talking ruthless buffalo hunter who may start an Indian war with his excess killing of the animals. Guest actors: Tom Tully, Parley Baer, Robert Pine, Jesse Pearson, Dennis Cross (it), Chuck Horne, Boyd Stockman.
40	"Time Is the Rider"	Jean Yarborough	Jameson Brewer	January 10, 1969
Jeff meets and rides off with a man he met in a saloon claiming to be a former Union Army major who was Jim's commanding officer and who claims to currently be in business with him. Actually, Jim turned down the man's offer of a partnership to rob a nearby fort's payroll, and he and his two accomplices want to now use a kidnapped Jeff as leverage to force Jim to participate in the crime. Meanwhile Will searches for Jeff with the help of an old prospector. Guest actors: Jason Evers, Douglas Fowley, James Griffith, Allen Jaffe, Joe Higgins, Sam Edwards, Rayford Barnes.
41	"Robber's Roost"	Andy Brennan	Arthur Browne Jr.	January 17, 1969
Will and Jeff travel to a Mexican town two miles south of the border that has been taken over by an outlaw gang and where they have been told James Sonnett may be found. Guest actors: James Best, Jess Walton (her first acting role), Dennis Cross (it), Bing Russell, William Fawcett (it), Michael Hinn, Bob Hoy.
42	"Trail's End"	Jean Yarborough	Kathleen Hite	January 31, 1969
A big man with a crazed personality wants revenge against Jim Sonnett, whom he believes killed his 18-year-old brother, a killing he didn't personally witness, and when Will and Jeff ride into town, he thinks they will lead him to Jim so that he can get his revenge. Guest stars: Morgan Woodward, Ruta Lee Jackie Searl (as Jack Searl), Bill Coontz (as Bill Foster), Ted de Corsia, Eddie Quillan.
43	"A Town In Terror" (Part 1)"	Jean Yarborough	Jameson Brewer	February 7, 1969
Part One: A cattlemen versus sheepmen story that has the cattle side hiring a famous gunfighter from Texas and the sheep side calling in Jim Sonnett, who is an old Army friend of the sheep rancher and will work for free to protect their side. Will and Jeff learn in town Jim is on his way and decide to stay and wait for him. Guest actors: Jason Evers, Sean McClory, Mort Mills, Harry Lauter, Bill Zuckert (as William Zuckert), Richard Hale, Don Wilbanks, Chuck Horne, Carlos Romero.
44	"A Town In Terror" (Part 2)"	Jean Yarborough	Jameson Brewer	February 14, 1969
Part Two: After Jim Sonnett meets and defeats his adversary on the trail, he assumes the man's identity as the cattlemen's enforcer in order to foil their plan to drive out the sheep ranchers from the territory. Jeff, meanwhile, has been told that it was Jim Sonnett who was killed and he angrily rides to town gunning for the man whom he believes killed his father, leading to a surprise encounter for Jeff seconds before guns are drawn. The cattlemen find out about Jim's ruse and take him hostage, leading to a final showdown with Will and Jeff present. Guest actors: Jason Evers, Sean McClory, Mort Mills, Richard Hale, Don Wilbanks, Chuck Horne, Carlos Romero.
45	"Jim Sonnett's Lady"	Jean Yarborough	Dick Carr	February 21, 1969
Jim Sonnett spends some romantic time with a female friend who owns a hotel and saloon unaware that his life is in danger and she has a role in the outcome. Will and Jeff intercept two men who are part of the plan. Guest actors: Jason Evers, Norma Crane, Peter Leeds, Bruce Glover, Mel Gallagher, Percy Helton, Bobby Byles, James McCallion (de).
46	"The Trial"	Jean Yarborough	Cliff Gould	February 28, 1969
A man on trial for a murder he claims he was only a witness to needs Jim Sonnett, who was also a witness, to come to town and testify in his defense. Newspaper stories attract Jim to the town, but the rancher whose son was killed and his allied crooked sheriff want to make sure he never gets to testify. Will and Jeff learn of the trial and ride to the town to make sure Jim isn't gunned down if he is able to sneak into the courthouse, which appears to be the only way he can testify to save the man. Guest actors: Jason Evers, Phillip Pine, Eddie Firestone, Guy Wilkerson, Chubby Johnson, Jon Lormer, Michael Hinn, Brendan Dillon.
47	"One Angry Juror"	Jean Yarborough	Peter Germano	March 7, 1969
While Jeff is recovering in a hotel room from a fever, the town sheriff spots Will outside and orders him to serve on a jury in a murder trial in which a Swedish immigrant is accused of murdering a prominent rancher's son. Will is the lone holdhout, reluctant to go along with a guilty verdict until he has more facts. The Swede refuses to testify in order to protect his wife, but his reason for wanting to protect her is not for the reason that may seem obvious, leading to a surprise and deadly conclusion in the courtroom. Guest actors: John Milford, Judson Pratt, Kevin Hagen, Ed Bakey, Susanne Cramer, Ben Wright, Don Keefer, Harry Harvey), William Phipps, Paul Sorensen, Erik Holland, Henry Hunter (uncredited).
48	"The Sodbuster"	Jean Yarborough	Kathleen Hite	March 14, 1969
Will and Jeff meet a farmer, his wife, and their young son who have had a string of bad luck but who helped Jim a year ago when he needed a place to rest, so they decide to stay awhile and offer to help build their new home, plow their field, and move a valuable piano the wife cherishes as a reminder of better days in the past. Guest actors: Jacqueline Scott, Don Dubbins, Teddy Eccles, Bartlett Robinson.
49	"The Man Who Killed James Sonnett"	Lewis Allen	James Komack	March 21, 1969
An actress in a traveling theater troupe who is fond of Jeff and another cast member help Jeff and Will find out the truth behind the play they are performing in which the third member of the cast claims he killed Jim Sonnett in a gunfight in another town in real life. Guest actors: Jay Novello, Robert F. Simon, Joan Van Ark, John Crawford, Harry Swoger, John Hale.
50	"Three Stand Together"	Jean Yarborough	Dick Carr	September 16, 1969
After two years of searching, Will, Jeff, and Jim Sonnett have a happy reunion on a hilltop road. Will convinces Jim it's time to settle down and the three ride to the town of Samson where the mayor, whom Will and Jeff had previously met, agrees to Will's proposal to hire him as sheriff and Jim and Jeff as his deputies. First up for the trio, dealing with a group of gunslingers who were hired to kill Jim. This episode is a sequel to the first season episode "The Natural Way", in which Will and Jeff were hired as temporary deputy sheriffs in the same town of Samson by the same mayor played by Bartlett Robinson. Actor Myron Healey plays the villain in both episodes, but different characters. Apart from the closing narration by Will, the last line of dialogue in this final episode of the series is by Jim Sonnett: "Amen." Guest actors: Jason Evers, Rex Holman, Myron Healey, Bartlett Robinson, James Chandler, Chuck Horne, Dub Taylor.

== Release ==
In 1971, some years after the show was cancelled, NBC Films begin syndicating the series. The show was later purchased by Leo A. Gutman, Inc., who paired up with Branded as part of Chuck Connors' Great Western Theatre, and eventually with King World Productions after Gutman was bought out.

Timeless Media Group released both seasons on DVD in Region 1 on July 14, 2009 in a 5-disc set entitled The Guns of Will Sonnett: The Complete Seasons 1&2. The episodes were taken from prints syndicated by King World, edited from the original broadcast versions, with 3 minutes missing from each episode. They are transferred from video tape sources and have not been remastered from the original film prints.

Currently, International rights to the series are held by Paramount Global. It is currently airing on MeTV+.

== Sequel ==
In 1970, series creators Dick Carr and Aaron Spelling worked again with Walter Brennan on the Western made-for-TV movie sequel The Over-the-Hill Gang Rides Again. It was written by Carr and produced by Thomas-Spelling Productions.

== Bibliography ==
- Tim Brooks and Earle Marsh, The Complete Directory to Prime Time Network and Cable TV Shows 1946–Present, Ninth edition (New York: Ballantine Books, 2007) ISBN 978-0-345-49773-4
