= Frank Lovejoy =

American actor (1912–1962)

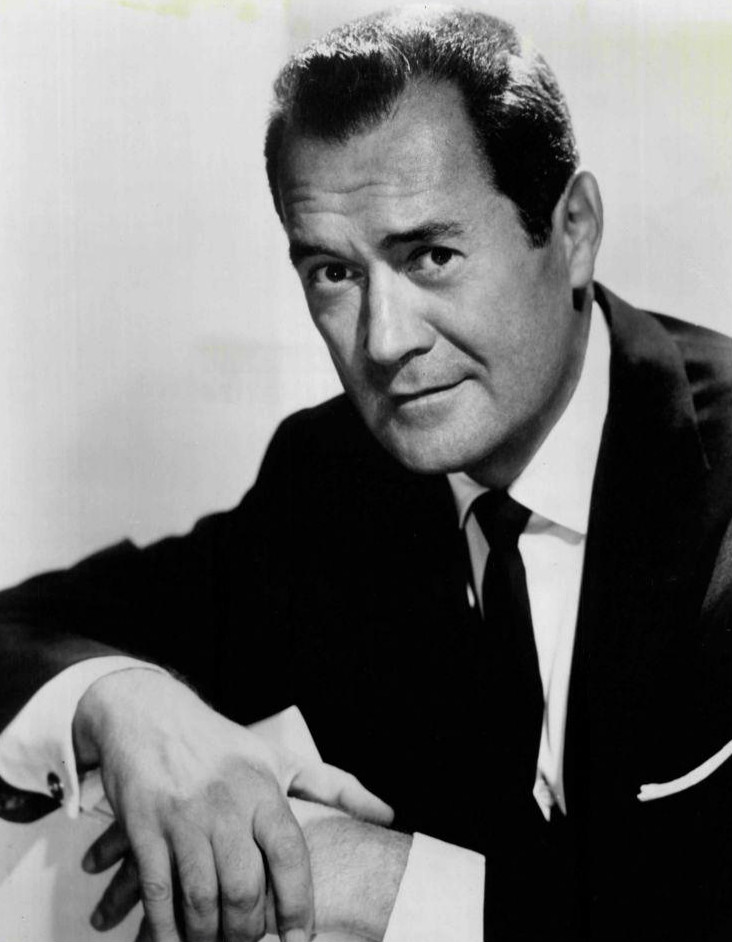
- Lovejoy in 1960
- Born: March 28, 1912; Bronx, New York, U.S.
- Died: October 2, 1962 (aged 50); New York City, U.S.
- Occupation: Actor
- Years active: 1937–1962
- Spouses: Frances Williams (m. 1939; div. 1940) Joan Banks (m. 1940)
- Children: 2
- Website: https://franklovejoy.com

Frank Andrew Lovejoy Jr. (March 28, 1912 – October 2, 1962) was an American actor in radio, film, and television. He is perhaps best remembered for appearing in the film noir The Hitch-Hiker and for starring in the radio drama Night Beat.

== Early life ==
He was born in the Bronx, New York, but grew up in New Jersey. His father, Frank Andrew Lovejoy Sr., was a furniture salesman from Maine. His mother, Nora, was born in Massachusetts, to Irish immigrant parents.

== Radio ==
A successful radio actor, Lovejoy played Broadway Harry on the Gay Nineties Revue and was heard on the 1930s crime drama series Gang Busters. Lovejoy was a narrator (during the first season) for the show This Is Your FBI.

In radio soap operas, Lovejoy played Dr. Christopher Ellerbe in Valiant Lady, Sam Foster in This Day Is Ours, and he had the roles of Brad Forbes on Brave Tomorrow and Larry Halliday in Bright Horizon. He also played the title character on the syndicated The Blue Beetle in 1940, several episodes of The Whistler, and starred in the later newspaper drama series Night Beat in the early 1950s and in episodes of Suspense in the late 1950s. He also starred as John Malone in The Amazing Mr. Malone. He appeared as boxer Rory Malone in the March 20, 1949, episode of Pat Novak for Hire titled "Rory Malone".

== Films ==
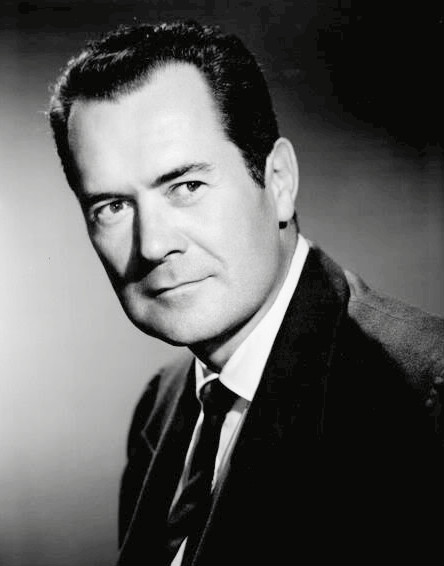
Lovejoy in 1958

Lovejoy mostly played supporting roles in films of the 1940s and 1950s. Appearing in movies such as Goodbye, My Fancy (1951) with Joan Crawford, and The Hitch-Hiker (1953) directed by Ida Lupino, Lovejoy was effective playing the movie's everyman in extraordinary situations. He was in several war movies, notably Stanley Kramer's Home of the Brave (1949), Breakthrough (1950), Joseph H. Lewis's Retreat, Hell! (1952) which portrayed the United States Marine Corps' withdrawal from the Chosin Reservoir (Changjin Reservoir) during the Korean War and as a Marine sergeant again in Beachhead (1954), and Strategic Air Command (1955) with James Stewart.

In 1950, he had the lead role in Try and Get Me (aka Sound of Fury) as a struggling, out-of-work man who fell to crime to support his family; in a film noir combining crime and murder with social injustice, an irresponsible newspaper and equally criminal public mob reactions. In 1951, he had the title role in I Was a Communist for the FBI with co-stars Ron Hagerthy, Paul Picerni, and Philip Carey.

== Television ==
Lovejoy starred in two short-run TV series, Man Against Crime and Meet McGraw.

Lovejoy's final television performances include the episode "County General" (March 18, 1962) on the ABC series Bus Stop with Marilyn Maxwell in the role of Grace Sherwood. That same season, he appeared on the ABC crime drama Target: The Corruptors! about the efforts of a New York City reporter to expose organized crime.

== Personal life ==
In 1940, Lovejoy married actress Joan Banks, with whom he had daughter Judith and son Stephen. On October 2, 1962, Lovejoy died of a heart attack in his sleep at the Warwick Hotel in New York City. He and Banks at the time had been performing together in a New Jersey production of Gore Vidal's play The Best Man.

Lovejoy was a practicing Roman Catholic. Following his sudden death from a heart attack, a funeral Mass was held at the Church of St. Paul the Apostle in New York City, and he was later interred at Holy Cross Cemetery in Culver City, California.

== Filmography ==
Film
Year	Title	Role	Notes
1948	Black Bart	Mark Lorimer	
1949	Home of the Brave	Sergeant Mingo	
1950	In a Lonely Place	Detective Sergeant Brub Nicolai	
1950	South Sea Sinner	Doc	
1950	Three Secrets	Bob Duffy	
1950	Breakthrough	Sgt. Pete Bell	
1950	Try and Get Me!	Howard Tyler	aka The Sound of Fury
1951	I Was a Communist for the FBI	Matt Cvetic	
1951	Goodbye, My Fancy	Matt Cole	
1951	Force of Arms	Major Blackford	
1951	I'll See You in My Dreams	Walter Donaldson	
1951	Starlift	Himself	
1952	Retreat, Hell!	Lieutenant Colonel Steve L. Corbett	
1952	The Winning Team	Rogers Hornsby	
1953	She's Back on Broadway	John Webber	
1953	The Hitch-Hiker	Gilbert Bowen	
1953	House of Wax	Lieutenant Thomas "Tom" Brennan	
1953	The System	John E. 'Johnny' Merrick	
1953	The Charge at Feather River	Sergeant Charlie Baker	
1954	Beachhead	Sgt. Fletcher	
1954	Men of the Fighting Lady	Lieutenant Commander Paul Grayson	
1955	The Americano	Bento Hermany	
1955	Strategic Air Command	General Ennis C. Hawkes	
1955	Top of the World	Maj. Brad Cantrell	
1955	Mad at the World	Police Capt. Tom Lynn	
1955	Finger Man	Casey Martin	
1955	Shack Out on 101	Professor Bastion	
1955	The Crooked Web	Stanley Fabian	
1956	Julie	Detective Lieutenant Pringle	
1958	Cole Younger, Gunfighter	Cole Younger	
Television
Year	Title	Role	Notes
1957–1958	Meet McGraw	McGraw	33 episodes
1957	Cavalcade of America	Inspector Ed McCook	Ep. 'Chicago 2-1-2'
Radio
Year	Title	Role	Notes
1948	The Blue Beetle		
1948	Box 13	Various support roles	-
1950	Escape		Episode: "Danger at Matecumbe"
1950–1952	Night Beat	Randy Stone	
1952	Gang Busters		
1952	Hollywood Sound Stage		Episode: "One Way Passage"
1952	Suspense	Joe Broady	Episode: "The Wreck of the Old 97"
1952	Suspense	Billy the Kid	Episode: "The Shooting of Billy the Kid"
1954	Suspense	Mr. Kedman	Episode: "The Man from Tomorrow"
