= Three Secrets =

1950 film by Robert Wise

- Film poster
- Directed by: Robert Wise
- Written by: Martin Rackin; Gina Kaus
- Produced by: Milton Sperling
- Starring: Eleanor Parker; Patricia Neal; Ruth Roman
- Cinematography: Sidney Hickox
- Edited by: Thomas Reilly
- Music by: David Buttolph
- Production company: United States Pictures
- Distributed by: Warner Bros. Pictures
- Release date: October 14, 1950
- Running time: 98 minutes
- Country: United States
- Language: English
- Box office: $1.4 million

Three Secrets is a 1950 Warner Bros. American drama film directed by Robert Wise and starring Eleanor Parker, Patricia Neal and Ruth Roman.

== Plot ==
A private plane crashes in the California mountains and a five-year-old boy survives. Little else is known except the child is an orphan.

Susan Chase believes that the boy could be hers. Before she was wed to lawyer Bill Chase, she was involved with a Marine during the war and became suicidal later, giving their child for adoption. Bill has never been told Susan's secret.

Newspaper reporter Phyllis Horn investigates the crash. She also has a secret, having given birth after a divorce from husband Bob Duffy, who has since remarried.

A third woman, Ann Lawrence, appears at the crash site. Ann was once a chorus girl involved with wealthy Gordon Crossley, who spurned her after she became pregnant. Scorned, Ann bludgeoned him to death and served five years in prison for manslaughter, losing contact with her child. The boy appears to be hers, but she believes that Susan is better qualified to provide the child with a good home.

== Cast ==
- Eleanor Parker as Susan Adele Connors Chase
- Patricia Neal as Phyllis Horn
- Ruth Roman as Ann Lawrence
- Frank Lovejoy as Bob Duffy
- Leif Erickson as Bill Chase
- Ted de Corsia as Del Prince
- Edmon Ryan as Hardin
- Larry Keating as Mark Harrison
- Katherine Warren as Mrs. Connors
- Arthur Franz as Paul Radin
- Frank Fenton as Sheriff Neil MacDonald
- Kenneth Tobey as Officer
- Frank Wilcox as Charlie
- Jay Adler as City Editor
- Billy Bevan as Ed Jackson

== See also ==
- List of American films of 1950
