= Merrill's Marauders (film) =

1962 film by Samuel Fuller

- Original film poster
- Directed by: Samuel Fuller
- Written by: Samuel Fuller; Milton Sperling
- Based on: The Marauders; 1959 book by Charlton Ogburn Jr
- Produced by: Milton Sperling (United States Pictures Productions)
- Starring: Jeff Chandler; Ty Hardin; Andrew Duggan; Claude Akins; Peter Brown; Will Hutchins; John Hoyt; Samuel V. Wilson
- Cinematography: William H. Clothier; Technicolor; CinemaScope
- Edited by: Folmar Blangsted
- Music by: Howard Jackson; Franz Waxman (uncredited score from Objective, Burma!); American Patrol by F. W. Meacham
- Distributed by: Warner Bros. Pictures
- Release date: June 13, 1962
- Running time: 98 minutes
- Country: United States
- Language: English
- Budget: over $1 million
- Box office: $1.6 million (US/Canada)

Merrill's Marauders is a 1962 Technicolor war film, photographed in CinemaScope, and directed and co-written by Samuel Fuller. It is based on the exploits of the long-range penetration jungle warfare unit of the same name in the Burma campaign, culminating in the Siege of Myitkyina.

The source is the nonfiction book The Marauders, written by Charlton Ogburn Jr., a communications officer who served with Merrill's Marauders. Filmed on location in the Philippines, the economical historical epic film stars Jeff Chandler (in his final role) as Frank Merrill and several actors from the Warner Bros. Television stock company, who were then the lead actors in American television shows. The supporting cast features Ty Hardin from Bronco, Peter Brown from Lawman, Andrew Duggan from Bourbon Street Beat, and Will Hutchins from Sugarfoot.

== Plot ==
The film begins with off-screen narration over black-and-white historical footage of the World War II Burma campaign, including mention of all nationalities of Allied forces who participated. The film then segues into color as Lt. Stockton's platoon moves through the jungle toward their first objective, the Japanese-held town of Walawbum. After Stockton radios Gen. Merrill they are nearing their goal, the brigade carries out a successful raid.

Afterwards, General Joseph Stilwell arrives in Walawbum. He orders Merrill to take the railroad center of Shaduzup, and ultimately the strategic airstrip at Myitkyina. With reluctance, Merrill summons Stockton to brief him on their next mission, and the unit continues their march through hellish swamps before taking Shaduzup from the enemy.

Stockton complains that his men need rest, that Merrill does not care, and he wants to be relieved of his command. Merrill refuses. The brigade continues the mission up steep mountains for several days and nights before digging in just outside the now-besieged Myitkyina. As night falls, the unit endures a massive artillery barrage, followed by a series of attempted overnight infiltrations by dagger-wielding Japanese soldiers. The next morning brings a Japanese banzai attack, which Merrill's men successfully repel. Then, while desperately rallying what is left of his unit to move on to the base at Myitkyina, the general suddenly collapses from a stroke. The men, led by Stockton, slowly rise up and trudge toward Myitkyina as an incredulous "Doc" cradles Merrill in his arms. In fact, Doc's off-screen narration is heard next as he relates that Myitkyina was indeed taken.

== Cast ==
- Jeff Chandler as Brig. Gen. Frank D. Merrill (final film role)
- Ty Hardin as 2nd Lt. Lee Stockton
- Peter Brown as Bullseye
- Andrew Duggan as Capt. Abraham Lewis Kolodny, MD
- Will Hutchins as Chowhound
- Claude Akins as Sgt. Kolowicz
- Paul Edwards as Chris
- Pancho Magalona as Taggy
- Luz Valdez as Burmese girl
- John Hoyt as Gen. Joseph Stilwell
- Charlie Briggs as Muley
- Chuck Roberson as Battalion Commander
- Chuck Hayward as Officer
- Chuck Hicks as Cpl. Doskis
- Samuel Vaughan Wilson as Lt. Col Bannister
- Jack Williams as Medic

== The Marauders ==
Charles Ogburn was a communications officer who served with Merril's Marauders for six months in 1944. He wrote a warm poem about it, which was published in 1944.

He wrote a book called The Marauders, which was published in 1959. The New York Times called it "one of the noblest and most sensitive books by any American about his own experience in war." The Los Angeles Times called it "easily one of the best books to come out of World War II."

== Development ==
In May 1959, film rights to the book were bought by producer Milton Sperling and his United States Pictures Productions.

In August, Charles Schnee was working on the script.

=== Sam Fuller ===
Sperling approached the experienced Samuel Fuller to write and direct The Marauders (the working title) in early 1961. Fuller was then attempting to have Warner Bros. finance and make his dream project, The Big Red One (like Ogburn, influenced by his own WWII combat experience), and initially refused Sperling's offer. Jack L. Warner summoned Fuller and told him that Merrill's Marauders would be a dry run for his The Big Red One.

Fuller's connection to the project was announced in November 1960.

For the lead role, Fuller wanted Gary Cooper, but Cooper felt that he was too old for the role. Fuller told Cooper that he would be writing the script, and that he felt Cooper was "perfect" for the part and "saw only him as my Merrill." Fuller recounted in his memoir that the real Merrill, was a "tough father figure with a commanding presence and an iron will," and that with Cooper in the role it would serve as a tribute to Fuller's commander in World War II, General Terry Allen, who would "always be there for his men." After Cooper declined the role, Fuller was impressed with former Universal Pictures contract star Jeff Chandler and cast him. His casting was announced in March 1961.

=== Script ===
Samuel Fuller and Milton Sperling simplify, but follow the events and narrative of Ogburn's historical account, but they use the character structure of Denis and Terry Sanders's screenplay for The Naked and the Dead; an earnest young lieutenant "Stock" in command of a military intelligence and reconnaissance platoon is a mediator between his men and a fatherly Brigadier General Frank Merrill. The screenplay also features a grave medical officer, "Doc", continually briefing Merrill on the physical and psychological condition of the men and on Merrill himself.

Fuller structured the script differently than his previous films, with little dialogue, combining "lots of quick shots to capture the raging storm of combat." In recounting how he showed the true-life heart condition of Merrill, Fuller pointed out that soldiers sometimes die of heart failure, "without a scratch" due to the emotional toll of combat, and "I wanted this movie to be truthful about it." One of the scenes of which he was most proud had no dialogue and showed the tough, bearded Sergeant Kolowicz breaking down in tears after being fed rice by an elderly woman

== Shooting ==
The film was shot in the Philippines, with 1200 soldiers from the Armed Forces of the Philippines, American soldiers of the 1st U.S. Army Special Forces Group at Okinawa and Clark Air Force Base, and cast the leading roles with several Warner Bros. contract stars who were then the leading men of popular programs, but would not be paid extra salary, three stuntmen (Chuck Roberson, Jack Williams, and Chuck Hicks), two Filipino film stars, and the film's technical advisor. Due to bad weather, Fuller shot six days over the allotted 41-day shooting schedule.

The company's name, United States Pictures Productions, gave the Philippine government and the film crews the impression that they were working with a branch of the United States government and they enthusiastically co-operated with the producer.

Merrill's Marauders was photographed by William H. Clothier, who used a trick from his work on The Alamo - silence precedes and follows the loud battle scenes. Fuller also eschewed sound effects for the sound of blanks. The U.S. Army was upset at the mood of and events in the film, particularly scenes in the Shaduzup maze of GIs accidentally killing other GIs, and had the scenes deleted. The original Shadazup maze scene was a single take with panning across the battle instead of cutting to close-ups of who was shooting whom. The studio told Fuller it looked "too artistic" and had a second unit director reshoot some of the scenes (only one scene appeared in the final print), and also changed the original ending to feature soldiers on dress parade, which angered Fuller; he thought it was "phony." He fought the studio, and they dropped plans to film The Big Red One.

Fuller felt that the studio's removal of the sequence in which GIs shot each other in the maze detracted from the reality of the film. He had been in combat and later recounted that "Americans sometimes shot Americans in the heat of battle."

== Stock footage and music ==
Another example of the economical production of the film was using extensive stock footage battle scenes from Battle Cry in the attack at Walawbum. Warner Bros. also used bits of Max Steiner's score for Operation Pacific and Franz Waxman's score from Objective, Burma! that was also used in Warner's Up Periscope (1959). The 1885 tune "American Patrol" is heard in not only the final parade scene, but also in bits throughout the film that either indicates that the film was scored after the addition of the changed ending or that "American Patrol" may have been the original title music rather than Howard Jackson's title theme.

== Reception ==
Merrill's Marauders was critically and financially successful, and was the final Warner Bros. film made in CinemaScope. The film was illustrated in a movie tie-in Dell Comics American comic book. Eighteen years after this film, Sam Fuller made another war film, The Big Red One, this time based on his own combat experiences in wartime Europe.

== Death of Jeff Chandler ==
During the film, Jeff Chandler, who had back problems, injured himself playing baseball with some of the American soldiers working on the film. Despite the pain, Chandler had injections and continued filming; his pain is noticeable. He fainted during shooting in the hot jungle, was flown back to Clark Air base in a U.S. Army helicopter and finished the film without further problems. On returning to the U.S., he died under anesthesia during back surgery. His death was deemed malpractice and resulted in a lawsuit that ended with a large settlement.
