= The Enforcer (1951 film) =

1951 film by Bretaigne Windust

- Theatrical release poster
- Directed by: Bretaigne Windust; Raoul Walsh (uncredited)
- Written by: Martin Rackin
- Produced by: Milton Sperling
- Starring: Humphrey Bogart; Zero Mostel; Everett Sloane
- Cinematography: Robert Burks
- Edited by: Fred Allen
- Music by: David Buttolph
- Color process: Black and white
- Production company: United States Pictures
- Distributed by: Warner Bros. Pictures
- Release date: January 25, 1951 (New York)
- Running time: 85 minutes
- Country: United States
- Language: English
- Budget: $1,109,000
- Box office: $2,873,000

The Enforcer (also known as Murder, Inc. in the United Kingdom) is a 1951 American film noir directed by Bretaigne Windust and an uncredited Raoul Walsh, who shot most of the film's suspenseful moments, including the ending. The production, largely a police procedural, stars Humphrey Bogart and is based on the Murder, Inc. trials. The supporting cast features Zero Mostel and Everett Sloane.

== Plot ==
Under heavy police protection, gangster Joe Rico arrives late at night at the courthouse to testify against crime boss Albert Mendoza. There have already been several attempts on Rico's life, but lead prosecutor Martin Ferguson reminds him that he faces numerous charges unless he cooperates. After another attempt on his life, Rico escapes his bodyguards but falls to his death from the ledge outside an eighth-floor window.

Without Rico's evidence, Mendoza will be acquitted. However, Ferguson believes that something else has arisen in the investigation that might cinch the case, so he and police captain Nelson examine the evidence again in flashback sequences. The case began when small-time gangster James "Duke" Malloy burst into a police station and claimed to have killed his girlfriend under pressure from others. The police find only an empty grave and Malloy later commits suicide in his cell. Ferguson is assigned to the case and a check on Malloy's associates leads the investigators to "Big Babe" Lazick. When Lazick refuses to talk, Ferguson threatens to jail his wife and commit his son to foster care. Lazick confesses that he is operating under the orders of Rico, who receives requests to commit murders over the telephone. The killers murder for profit, as they are hired at the request of someone else. The killer will have no motive for committing the crime and thus will not be suspected by the police, while the client with the motive will have a perfect alibi. Only Rico knows the identity of the top boss.

Lazick leads the police to the body of Nina Lombardo, who Malloy was supposed to kill, but he instead fell in love with her. Although they tried to hide, Malloy's associates found them and forced Malloy to kill her. Nina's roommate, Teresa Davis, tells the detectives that Nina's real name was Angela Vetto and that she was in hiding since her father's murder ten years earlier.

The police find a mass grave filled with dozens of bodies. As the authorities near closer, the gang begins to disband. Rico is hiding on a farm with his last remaining accomplices and witnesses their shooting by hired killers who have been sent to silence everyone. Rico then contacts Ferguson, offering to testify against his secret boss, Mendoza. He reports that Tony Vetto and his daughter Angela had witnessed Mendoza's first murder but now there were no survivors for the prosecution.

Frustrated, Ferguson leaves photos of victims in Mendoza's prison cell. He then listens to an audiotape recording of Rico's confession, which is inadmissible in court. In the recording Rico, describes Vetto's daughter as having "big blue eyes", but Ferguson remembers that Nina Lombardo (assumed to be Angela Vetto) had brown eyes. However, Teresa did have blue eyes and Ferguson concludes that Nina was fingered as Duke's contract by mistake. Upon viewing Nina's photograph, Mendoza reaches the same conclusion and, with the assistance of his attorney, dispatches two of his remaining henchmen to pursue the real Angela Vetto. Ferguson and Nelson arrive at Angela's residence but discover that she has left the house for a shopping trip. The bustling streets make it challenging for them to locate her, prompting Ferguson to use a music store's sidewalk loudspeakers to alert her of the imminent danger and to instruct her to contact him at the store. Angela heeds the warning and promptly contacts Ferguson with the relentless killers in close pursuit. In the ensuing confrontation, Ferguson eliminates one of the gangsters while the other is apprehended. With Angela under his protection, he safely escorts her away, ensuring her ability to testify against Mendoza.

== Cast ==
- Humphrey Bogart as Dist. Atty. Martin Ferguson
- Zero Mostel as Big Babe Lazick
- Ted de Corsia as Joseph Rico
- Everett Sloane as Albert Mendoza
- Roy Roberts as Capt. Frank Nelson
- Michael Tolan as James (Duke) Malloy (as Lawrence Tolan)
- King Donovan as Sgt. Whitlow
- Bob Steele as Herman (as Robert Steele)
- Adelaide Klein as Olga Kirshen
- Don Beddoe as Thomas O'Hara
- Tito Vuolo as Tony Vetto
- John Kellogg as Vince
- Jack Lambert as Philadelphia Tom Zaca
- Patricia Joiner as Teresa Davis / Angela Vetto (uncredited)

== Production ==
Director Bretaigne Windust fell seriously ill during the beginning of shooting, so Raoul Walsh was recruited to finish the film. Walsh refused to take the credit, calling it Windust's work.

This was Humphrey Bogart's last film for Warner Bros. Pictures, the studio that had made him a star, although Warner Bros. was only the distributor for the film. It was produced by United States Pictures and is now owned by Republic Pictures, a division of Paramount Pictures.

Although largely fictional, the film is based on the real-life investigation into a group of hired killers dubbed by the press as "Murder, Inc." (the film was released under that title in the United Kingdom). It was during this investigation, and the Kefauver hearings, that terms such as "contract" (a deal to commit a murder) and "hit" (the actual killing itself) first entered the public knowledge. The gangsters used such codes to thwart eavesdroppers and police phone taps.

The Martin Ferguson character is based on Burton Turkus, who led the prosecutions of several members of the Murder, Inc. gang. His book on the case was published at about the same time when the film was released.

The Joe Rico character may have been inspired by Abe Reles, who was found dead after falling from the Half Moon Hotel in Coney Island on November 12, 1941, although under heavy police guard, just before he was to testify against a major crime lord. It has never been established whether Reles's death was murder, accident or suicide.

== Reception ==
In a contemporary review for The New York Times, critic Bosley Crowther wrote: "[M]urder on such a gaudy scale tends to become monotonous—and a little ridiculous, too. No matter how naturalistic and grisly the boys have made the deeds—and, you can believe us, they have made them naturalistic and grisly to a fare-thee-well—the sheer accumulation of ugly violence and brutality eventually becomes dull. ... However, we'll say for Mr. Bogart and for those who assist him in this film—or, rather, for those who oppose him—they do not play tiddlywinks. As the hard and relentless researcher who goes back and reconstructs a spade of crimes ... Mr. Bogart behaves in the manner of a gentleman accustomed to crime but not a little bewildered by the multiplicity encountered here. So perturbed is he in the situation that you wonder sometimes if he did some crimes himself."

Variety magazine praised Windust, writing: "The film plays fast and excitingly in dealing with Humphrey Bogart’s efforts to bring the head of a gang of killers to justice. The script uses the flashback technique to get the story on film, but it is wisely used so as not to tip the ending and spoil suspense ... Bretaigne Windust’s direction is thorough, never missing an opportunity to sharpen suspense values, and the tension builds constantly."

According to Warner Bros. records, the film earned $1,584,000 domestically and $1,289,000 abroad.

Film critic Dennis Schwartz has questioned whether the film should be labeled as film noir, writing, "The crime film tells for the first time in film how a mob works and its use of terms such as 'contract', 'hit', and 'finger man.' It is shot in a semi-documentary style and looked more like a crime caper movie than the film noir category most film critics have classified it under."
