= My Girl Tisa =

1948 film by Elliott Nugent

- Theatrical release poster
- Directed by: Elliott Nugent
- Written by: Allen Boretz
- Based on: Ever the Beginning by Lucille S. Prumbs and Sara B. Smith
- Produced by: Milton Sperling
- Starring: Lilli Palmer; Sam Wanamaker; Akim Tamiroff
- Cinematography: Ernest Haller
- Edited by: Christian Nyby
- Music by: Max Steiner
- Production company: United States Pictures
- Distributed by: Warner Bros. Pictures
- Release date: February 7, 1948
- Running time: 95 minutes
- Country: United States
- Language: English

My Girl Tisa is a 1948 American period drama film directed by Elliott Nugent and starring Lilli Palmer, Sam Wanamaker and Akim Tamiroff. It is based on the play Ever the Beginning by Lucille S. Prumbs and Sara B. Smith (copyrighted 14 May 1946).

== Plot ==
In 1905, Tisa Kepes is an immigrant who is living in a New York City boarding house and struggling to make ends meet, making very little money working for a Mr. Grumbach in the garment district. An aspiring lawyer, Mark Denek, also is a boarder there, dreaming of someday meeting his idol, President Teddy Roosevelt.

Tisa is trying to earn enough to pay for her father's boat passage so he can join her in America. In an attempt to assist her, Mark loses his job with a politician, Dugan, is double-crossed by a ship captain named Tescu who intends to make Tisa's father work for him, then ends up getting Tisa slated for deportation. In love with Tisa and desperate, Mark has a chance encounter with Roosevelt, who intervenes at the last instant on their behalf.

== Cast ==
- Lilli Palmer as Tisa Kepes
- Sam Wanamaker as Mark Denek
- Akim Tamiroff as Mr. Grumbach
- Alan Hale, Sr. as Dugan
- Hugo Haas as Tescu
- Gale Robbins as Jenny Kepes
- John Qualen as Svenson
- Sidney Blackmer as Theodore Roosevelt
- Fritz Feld as Prof. Tabor
- John Banner as Otto
- Hobart Cavanaugh as Sigmund (uncredited)
- Charles Middleton as Examiner (uncredited)
- Ivan F. Simpson as Old Man (uncredited)
- Jack Mower as Postman (uncredited)

== See also ==
- List of American films of 1948
