= Cloak and Dagger (1946 film) =

1946 film by Fritz Lang

- Theatrical poster
- Directed by: Fritz Lang
- Screenplay by: Albert Maltz; Ring Lardner Jr.
- Story by: Boris Ingster; John Larkin
- Based on: Cloak and Dagger: The Secret Story of O.S.S. by: Corey Ford; Alastair MacBain
- Produced by: Milton Sperling
- Starring: Gary Cooper; Lilli Palmer
- Cinematography: Sol Polito
- Edited by: Christian Nyby
- Music by: Max Steiner
- Production company: United States Pictures
- Distributed by: Warner Bros. Pictures
- Release date: September 28, 1946 (United States)
- Running time: 106 minutes
- Country: United States
- Language: English
- Budget: $2,070,000
- Box office: $2.5 million (US rentals) or $4,408,000

Cloak and Dagger is a 1946 American spy film directed by Fritz Lang which stars Gary Cooper as an American scientist sent by the Office of Strategic Services (OSS) to contact European scientists working on the German nuclear weapons program and Lilli Palmer as a member of the Italian resistance movement who shelters and guides him. The story was drawn from the 1946 non-fiction book Cloak and Dagger: The Secret Story of O.S.S. by Corey Ford and Alastair MacBain. Former OSS agent E. Michael Burke acted as technical advisor. Like 13 Rue Madeleine (1947), the film was intended as a tribute to Office of Strategic Services (OSS) operations in German-occupied Europe during World War II.

== Plot ==
In 1944, a handsome bachelor and nuclear physicist named Alvah Jesper is working in the United States on the Manhattan Project to build a nuclear bomb. Recruited into the Office of Strategic Services, his mission is to make contact with a Hungarian nuclear physicist, Katerin Lodor, who has been working on the German project to make a nuclear bomb and has escaped into neutral Switzerland. Flown into Switzerland, Alvah finds it full of German agents who, after he manages one brief conversation with Katerin, abduct her. By befriending and then blackmailing Ann Dawson, an attractive American working as a German agent, he discovers where Katerin is being held, but an OSS raid on the building fails and she is shot dead.

In the conversation, Katerin had said that the Germans wanted her to work with an Italian nuclear physicist named Polda. The OSS land Alvah in Italy from a British submarine and he is hidden by an attractive member of the Resistance, Gina. He manages to conduct a brief conversation with Polda, who agrees to work with the Americans only if the OSS first frees his daughter Maria, who is being held by the Germans. The OSS raid on the building is successful and they deliver Maria to her father at an isolated safe house. He is horrified, because the woman is not his daughter but a German agent, who says the house is surrounded by German troops. In the ensuing gun battle, Alvah and Gina smuggle Polda out through a tunnel from the house to a nearby well and struggle across country to a rendezvous with a British aircraft which will fly them out. Polda and Alvah board it safely. Although there is room for her, Gina says she must stay behind to free her country from the Germans and begs Alvah to come back for her when the war is over.

== Cast ==
- Gary Cooper as Professor Alvah Jesper
- Robert Alda as Pinkie
- Lilli Palmer as Gina
- Vladimir Sokoloff as Polda
- J. Edward Bromberg as Trenk
- Marjorie Hoshelle as Ann Dawson
- Ludwig Stössel as The German
- Helene Thimig as Katerin Lodor
- Dan Seymour as Marsoli
- Marc Lawrence as Luigi
- James Flavin as Colonel Walsh
- Patrick O'Moore as The Englishman
- Charles Marsh as Erich
- Hella Petri as Rachel

== Missing final reel ==
As planned by Lang, the film had a different ending. Jesper (Cooper) leads a group of American paratroopers into Germany to discover the remains of an underground factory, the bodies of dead concentration camp workers, and evidence the factory was working on nuclear weapons.

Jesper remarks that the factory may have been relocated to Spain or Argentina and launched a diatribe saying: "This is the Year One of the Atomic Age and God help us if we think we can keep this secret from the World!"

Producer Milton Sperling, who had frequently quarreled with Lang on the set, thought the final scene ridiculous, since the audience knew the Germans had no nuclear capacity. The film's screenwriters Lardner and Maltz became two of the Hollywood Ten, accused of adding communist dogma to movie scripts such as this one. Writing a script saying the US could not keep nuclear secrets from the USSR, such as in this film, was one of many accusations against the Ten.

== Radio show ==
A 1950 NBC radio show of the same title based on Ford and MacBain's book lasted 26 episodes. Cloak and Dagger began with actor Raymond Edward Johnson asking "Are you willing to undertake a dangerous mission for the United States knowing in advance you may never return alive?"

== Box office ==
According to Warner Bros., records the film earned $2,580,000 domestically and $1,828,000 abroad.

== See also ==
- Cloak and dagger, the English language idiom
