= Lilli Palmer =

German actress (1914–1986)

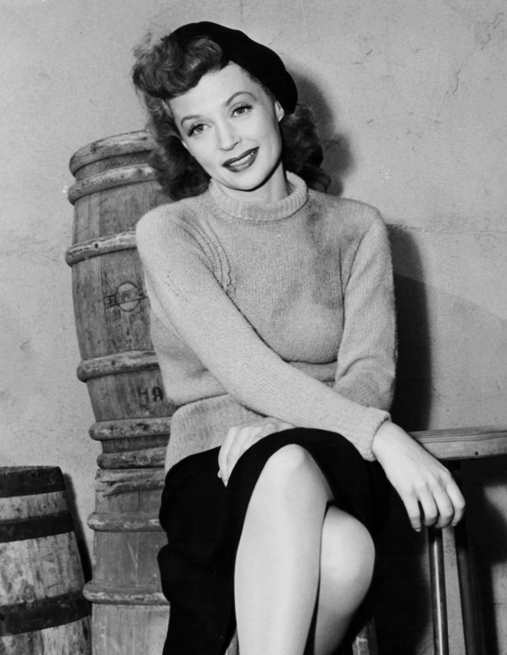
- Palmer in Cloak and Dagger (1946)
- Born: Lilli Marie Peiser; 24 May 1914; Posen, Kingdom of Prussia, German Empire (Poznań, Poland)
- Died: 27 January 1986 (aged 71); Los Angeles, California, U.S.
- Resting place: Forest Lawn Memorial Park, Glendale, California
- Years active: 1935–1986
- Spouses: Rex Harrison (m. 1943; div. 1957) Carlos Thompson (m. 1957)
- Children: Carey Harrison
- Relatives: Irene Prador (sister)

Lilli Palmer (German: [ˈlɪ.li ˈpal.mɐ]; born Lilli Marie Peiser; 24 May 1914 – 27 January 1986) was a German actress and writer. After beginning her career in British films in the 1930s, she later transitioned to major Hollywood productions, earning a Golden Globe Award nomination for her performance in But Not for Me (1959).

Other roles include in the comedy The Pleasure of His Company (1961), the Spanish horror film The House That Screamed (1969), and in the miniseries Peter the Great (1986), which earned her another Golden Globe Award nomination. For her career in European films, Palmer won the Volpi Cup, and the Deutscher Filmpreis three times.

== Early life ==
Palmer, who took her surname from an English actress she admired, was one of three daughters born to Alfred Peiser, a German Jewish surgeon, and Rose Lißmann (or Lissmann), a German Jewish stage actress, in Posen, Germany (today Poznań, Poland).

When Lilli was four years old, her family moved to Berlin-Charlottenburg. She was a junior table tennis champion as a young girl.

== Career ==
In France, she appeared in an operetta at the Moulin Rouge, and then went to London, where she began her film career. While performing in cabarets, she attracted the attention of British talent scouts and was offered a contract by Gaumont. She made her screen debut in Crime Unlimited (1935) and appeared in numerous British films for the next decade.

She married British actor Rex Harrison on 25 January 1943, and travelled with him to Hollywood in 1945. She signed with Warner Brothers and appeared in several films, notably Cloak and Dagger (1946) and Body and Soul (1947).

She periodically appeared in stage plays as well as hosting her own television series in 1951. Harrison and Palmer appeared together in the hit Broadway play Bell, Book and Candle in the early 1950s. They also appeared in the 1951 British melodrama The Long Dark Hall, and later starred in the film version of The Four Poster (1952), which was based on the award-winning Broadway play of the same name, written by Jan de Hartog. She won the Volpi Cup for Best Actress in 1953 for The Four Poster.

Harrison and Palmer divorced in 1957; they had one son, Carey, born in 1944.

Palmer returned to Germany in 1954, where she played roles in many films and television productions. She also continued to play both leading and supporting parts in the U.S. and abroad. In 1957, she won the Deutscher Filmpreis for Best Actress for her portrayal of Anna Anderson in The Story of Anastasia, called Is Anna Anderson Anastasia? in the UK. In 1958, she played the role of a teacher opposite Romy Schneider in Mädchen in Uniform (Girls in Uniform), the remake of the 1931 film of the same title.

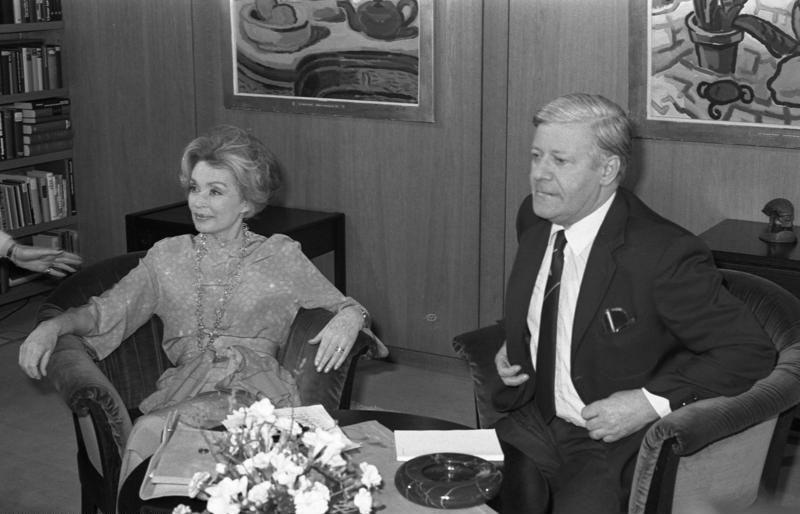
Palmer interviewing German chancellor Helmut Schmidt in 1982

Palmer starred with Fred Astaire and Debbie Reynolds in The Pleasure of His Company in 1961.

She starred opposite William Holden in The Counterfeit Traitor (1962), an espionage thriller based on fact, and opposite Robert Taylor in another true Second World War story, Disney's Miracle of the White Stallions (1963). On the small screen, in 1974 she starred as Manouche Roget in the six-part television drama series The Zoo Gang, about a group of former underground freedom fighters from the Second World War, with Brian Keith, Sir John Mills and Barry Morse.

Palmer published a memoir, Change Lobsters and Dance, in 1975. She wrote a full-length work of fiction presented as a novel rather than a memoir, The Red Raven, in 1978.

== Personal life ==
Palmer's first marriage was to Rex Harrison in 1943. They divorced amicably in 1957, so that he could marry ailing actress Kay Kendall before her untimely death. Palmer agreed since she was already involved with her future husband, Carlos Thompson.

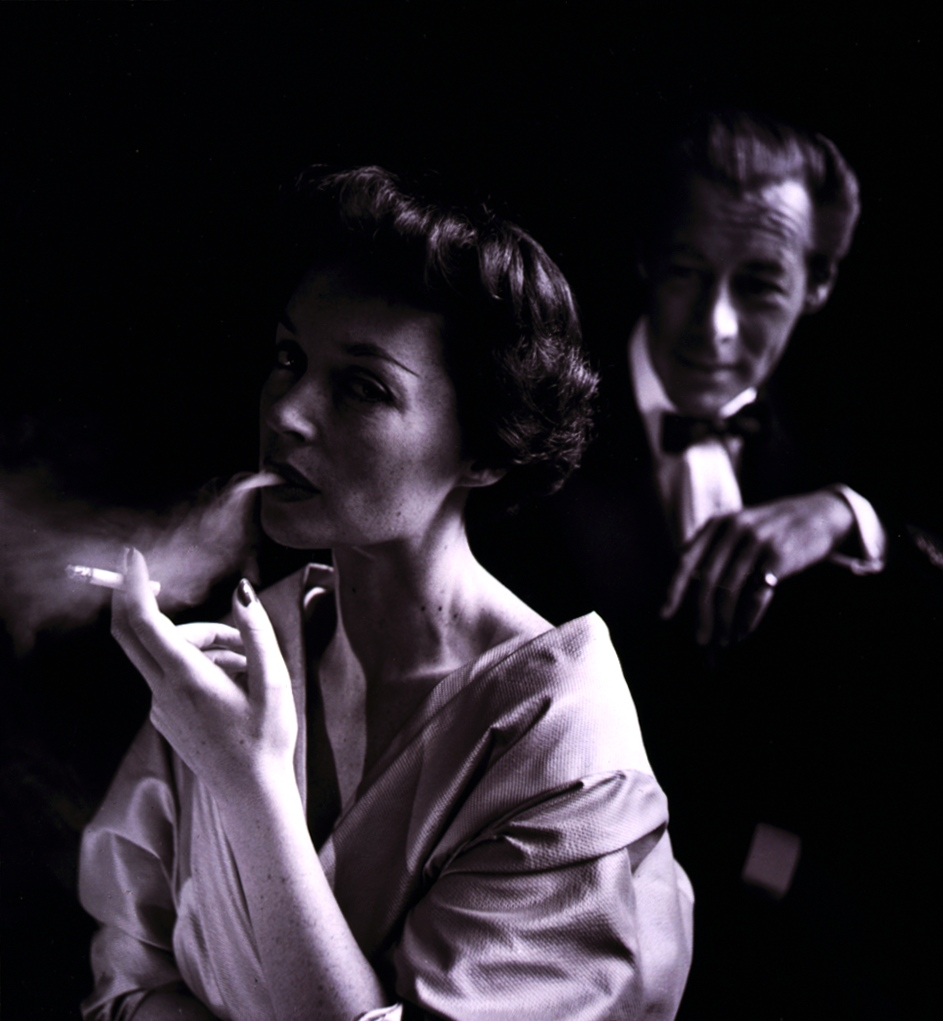
Lilli Palmer (with husband Rex Harrison), 1950

Palmer was married to Argentine actor Carlos Thompson from 1957 until her death in Los Angeles from abdominal cancer in 1986 at the age of 71. She was survived by her husband, son, sisters, and her ex-husband.

Palmer is interred at Forest Lawn Memorial Park, Glendale, California. A portion of the ashes of her first husband, Rex Harrison, were scattered on her grave.

== Accolades ==
- 1953: Volpi Cup for Best Actress for The Four Poster
- 1956: Deutscher Filmpreis (Silver) for Best Actress in Teufel in Seide
- 1957: Deutscher Filmpreis (Silver) for Best Actress in Anastasia, die letzte Zarentochter
- 1959: Golden Globe Award for Best Actress – Motion Picture Musical or Comedy nomination for But Not for Me
- 1972: Goldene Kamera for Eine Frau bleibt eine Frau (ZDF TV)
- Star on the Hollywood Walk of Fame at 7013 Hollywood Blvd.
- 1974: Great Cross of Merit of the Federal Republic of Germany (Großes Verdienstkreuz der Bundesrepublik Deutschland)
- 1978: Deutscher Filmpreis (Gold) for Lifetime Achievement
- 1986: Golden Globe Award for Best Supporting Actress – Series, Miniseries or Television Film nomination for Peter the Great

== Filmography ==
=== Film ===
Year	Title	Role	Notes
1935	Crime Unlimited	Natacha	
1936	Wolf's Clothing	Lydia	
1936	The First Offence	Jeannette	
1936	Secret Agent	Lilli	
1937	Good Morning, Boys	Yvette	
1937	The Great Barrier	Lou	
1937	Command Performance	Susan	
1938	Crackerjack	Baroness Von Haltz	
1939	A Girl Must Live	Clytie Devine	
1939	Blind Folly	Valerie	
1940	Sunset in Vienna	Gelda Sponek	
1940	The Door with Seven Locks	June Lansdowne	Also known as: Chamber of Horrors
1942	Thunder Rock	Melanie Kurtz	
1943	The Gentle Sex	Erna Debruski	
1944	English Without Tears	Brigid Knudsen	Also known as: Her Man Gilbey
1945	The Rake's Progress	Rikki Krausner	Also known as: Notorious Gentleman
1946	Beware of Pity	Baroness Edith de Kekesfalva	
1946	Cloak and Dagger	Gina	
1947	Body and Soul	Peg Born	
1948	My Girl Tisa	Tisa Kepes	
1948	No Minor Vices	April Ashwell	
1949	Wicked City	Tania	
1951	The Long Dark Hall	Mary Groome	
1952	The Four Poster	Abby Edwards	
1953	Main Street to Broadway	Lilli Palmer	
1954	Fireworks	Iduna	
1956	Devil in Silk	Melanie	
1956	The Taming of the Shrew	Katherina	TV movie
1956	The Story of Anastasia	Anna Anderson	
1956	Between Time and Eternity	Nina Bohlen	
1957	The Night of the Storm	Marianne Eichler	
1957	The Glass Tower	Katja Fleming	
1958	A Woman Who Knows What She Wants	Julia Klöhn, Lehrerin & Angela Cavallini	
1958	The Lovers of Montparnasse	Beatrice Hastings	Also known as: Modigliani of Montparnasse
1958	Girls in Uniform	Elisabeth von Bernburg	Also known as: Mädchen in Uniform
1958	Life Together	Odette de Starenberg	Also known as: La Vie à deux
1959	But Not for Me	Kathryn Ward	
1960	Mrs. Warren's Profession	Mrs. Kitty Warren	
1960	Conspiracy of Hearts	Mother Katharine	
1961	The Pleasure of His Company	Katharine Dougherty	
1961	The Last of Mrs. Cheyney	Mrs. Cheney	
1961	Dark Journey	Mother	Also known as: Leviathan
1962	The Constant Wife	Constanze Calonder	
1962	The Counterfeit Traitor	Mrs. Marianne Möllendorf	
1962	Le rendez-vous de minuit	Eva / Anne Leuven	
1962	Adorable Julia	Julia Lambert	
1962	Of Wayward Love	Hilde	Also known as: Sex Can Be Difficult, (segment "Il serpente")
1963	Miracle of the White Stallions	Vedena Podhajsky	
1963	Torpedo Bay	Lygia da Silva	
1963	And So to Bed	Actress	
1964	Le Grain de sable	Anna-Maria di Scorza	
1965	Operation Crossbow	Frieda	Silver Shell for Best Actress
1965	The Amorous Adventures of Moll Flanders	Dutchy	
1965	God's Thunder	Marie Brassac	Also known as: Le Tonnerre de Dieu
1966	Two Girls from the Red Star	Olga Nikolaijewna	Also known as: An Affair of States
1966	Congress of Love	Princess Metternich	Also known as: Der Kongreß amüsiert sich
1966	Le Voyage du père	Isabelle Quantin	Also known as: Father's Trip
1967	The Dance of Death	Alice	
1967	Jack of Diamonds	Herself	
1967	The Diary of Anne Frank	Edith Frank	TV movie
1968	Sebastian	Elsa Shahn	
1968	Oedipus the King	Jocasta	
1968	Nobody Runs Forever	Sheila Quentin	
1969	Hard Contract	Adrianne	
1969	De Sade	Mademoiselle de Montreuil	
1969	The House That Screamed	Señora Fourneau	Also known as: La residencia
1970	Only the Cool	Helen	
1970	Hauser's Memory	Anna Hauser	TV movie
1971	Murders in the Rue Morgue	Mrs. Charron	
1972	What the Peeper Saw	Dr. Viorne	
1975	Lotte in Weimar	Lotte	
1978	The Boys from Brazil	Esther Lieberman	
1980	Weekend	Judith Bliss	TV movie
1981	Kinder	Mother	TV movie, Also known as: Children
1982	High Society Limited	Hilde	
1982	Imaginary Friends	Ellen Pitblado	TV movie
1985	The Holcroft Covenant	Althene Holcroft	
2018	The Other Side of the Wind	Zarah Valeska	(final film role, released posthumously)

=== Television ===
Year	Title	Role	Notes
1938	Starlight		Episode: "Richard Hearne"
1938	S-s-s-h! The Wife!	The Wife	Short
1949	Suspense	Julia	Episode: "The Comic Strip Murder"
1950	The Philco-Goodyear Television Playhouse	Molly Collicutt	Episode: "The Uncertain Molly Collicutt"
1952	Lux Video Theatre	Nancy	Episode: "Three Hours Between Planes"
1952	Omnibus	Anne Boleyn	Episode: "The Trial of Anne Boleyn"
1953	The United States Steel Hour	Mrs. Chrystal Weatherby	Episode: "The Man in Possession"
1954	Four Star Playhouse	Stacy Lawrence	Episode: "Lady of the Orchids"
1971	Der Kommissar	Hilde Larasser	Episode: "Grau-roter Morgen"
1972–1979	Eine Frau bleibt eine Frau	Various	5 episodes
1974	The Zoo Gang	Manouche 'The Leopard' Roget	6 episodes
1974	Derrick	Martha Balke / Johanna Jensen	Episode: "Johanna"
1984	The Love Boat	Lilly Marlowe	2 episodes
1986	Peter the Great	Natalya	Miniseries

== Radio appearances ==
Year	Program	Episode/source
1946	Suspense	"Philomel Cottage"
1952	Theatre Guild on the Air	An Ideal Husband
1953	Star Playhouse	No Time for Comedy
1953	Star Playhouse	Twentieth Century
