= Charles Mergendahl =

American writer (1919–1959)

- Born: Charles Henry Mergendahl, Jr. February 23, 1919; Lynn, Massachusetts, U.S.
- Died: April 27, 1959 (aged 40); Glen Cove, New York, U.S.
- Education: Phillips Exeter Academy, Bowdoin College, Harvard University, Boston University
- Occupations: Novelist; screenwriter
- Relatives: Alice (née Brockway); Charles Henry Mergendahl; (parents)
- Writing career
- Notable work: The Bramble Bush
- Military career
- Branch: United States Naval Reserve
- Service years: 1942–1945
- Rank: Lieutenant
- Conflicts: Battle of Tarawa
- Awards: Bronze Star

Charles Mergendahl (February 23, 1919 – April 27, 1959) was an American writer, best known for his salacious 1958 novel The Bramble Bush (1958) and its 1960 film adaptation. He also contributed original scripts and adaptations to various American television anthology series throughout the 1950s.

== Biography ==
=== Early life and career ===
Charles H. Mergendahl Jr. was born in 1919 in Lynn, Massachusetts, the first of five children born to Charles Henry Mergendahl and Alice Brockway—the former a math instructor at Classical High School, the latter an English teacher at Worcester High School of Commerce. Charles Jr. attended Newton High School and Phillips Exeter Academy, graduating in 1937. He received his B.A. from Bowdoin College, graduating in 1941, and his M.A. from Boston University.

Throughout high school and college, Mergendahl had been involved in theater; in 1941, his play, My Last Duchess (a blank-verse dramatization of Robert Browning's much-anthologized poem), was awarded 1st prize in Bowdoin College's annual one-act play competition and his next play prompted the Boston Globe to write:

Mr. Mergendahl shows promise. He has a clever manner of writing lines that bring out what is really inside of his characters. He also has the ability to create a tense situations and to draw characters in contrast. Less commendable, however, is his way of looking at the world as though everyone in it is in the wrong profession and unhappy.

Although an extended tour of duty in World War II necessarily brought his direct participation in theatre to an end, it does not appear to have adversely affected Mergendahl's productivity. In 1945, United Press reported that "during eight major engagements," Mergendahl had, by his own account, "written four novels, eight plays, and thirty short stories."

He was awarded a Bronze Star decoration for his military service in leading the first wave of Marines onto the beach during the Battle of Tarawa in the Pacific War.

== Death ==
On April 26, 1959, during the filming of his most famous novel (which was being reprinted to coincide with the release), Mergendahl experienced brain trauma following an accidental fall at his home on 18 Leuce Place in Glen Cove, Long Island. He was taken to Community Hospital, where he died the following day at age 40. Predeceased by his wife, Mergendahl was survived by his daughter and four siblings.

== Works ==
=== Drama ===
- The Twig (1940)
- My Last Duchess (1941)
- Me and Harry (1941)
- Watch for the Morning (1941)
  Christmas Fantasy
  Park Bench
  Standing Room Only

=== Fiction ===
==== Novels ====
- Don't Wait Up for Spring (1944) (aka Tonight is Forever (1951))
- His Days are as Grass (1946)
- This Spring of Love (1948)
- It's Only Temporary (1951)
- The Girl Cage (1953) (aka The Lonely Ones (1958))
- With Kisses Four (1954)
- The Bramble Bush (1958)
- Rage of Desire (1958)
- Tiger by the Tail (1959)
- A Strange Innocence (1959)
- 22 Terrace Place (1961)
- Call After Six (1961)
- The Drums of April (1964)

=== Filmography ===
==== Television ====
- Kraft Theatre
  "The Picture Window" (1954)
  "Split Level" (1954)
- Ponds Theater
  "See You on Sunday" (1954)
  "The Rugged Mountains" (1955)
- The Pepsi-Cola Playhouse
  "I'll Be Waiting" (story, 1955)
- Matinee Theatre
  "See You on Sunday" (1955)
  "Herself Alone" (1956)
- Star Tonight
  "Three Hours Between Planes" (adaptation, 1956)
- The Man Called X
  "Forged Documents" (story, 1957)

==== Film ====
- The Bramble Bush (novel, 1960)
