= Pursued =

1947 film by Raoul Walsh

- Theatrical release poster
- Directed by: Raoul Walsh
- Screenplay by: Niven Busch
- Produced by: Milton Sperling
- Starring: Teresa Wright; Robert Mitchum; Judith Anderson; Dean Jagger; Alan Hale Sr.
- Cinematography: James Wong Howe
- Edited by: Christian Nyby
- Music by: Max Steiner
- Production company: United States Pictures
- Distributed by: Warner Bros. Pictures
- Release date: March 5, 1947
- Running time: 101 minutes
- Country: United States
- Language: English
- Budget: £610,000 or $1,678,000
- Box office: $2.9 million (US rentals) or $3,711,000

Pursued is a 1947 American Neo-western film noir directed by Raoul Walsh with cinematography by James Wong Howe, written by Niven Busch, and starring Teresa Wright and Robert Mitchum. The supporting cast features Judith Anderson, Dean Jagger, Alan Hale Sr., and Harry Carey Jr. The music is by Max Steiner and the picture was shot on location in Gallup, New Mexico.

== Plot ==
Set in New Mexico around the turn of the 20th century and told in flashback, the film tells the story of Jeb Rand, whose entire family was slaughtered when he was a child. In the aftermath of the massacre Jeb is found by Mrs Callum, a widow, who raises him in her family. Traumatized by the killings, Jeb does not recall anything from that night, except for vague images that he sees in a frequent nightmare. Mrs Callum raises him as her own son, together with her daughter Thorley "Thor" and her son Adam. Years later Jeb is shot at while riding a colt, but the shooter misses him. Although Mrs Callum blames the incident on deer hunters, she knows that it was an attempted murder by her brother-in-law, Grant. She confronts Grant and it is revealed that there has been a long-standing feud between the Rands and the Callums. Jeb's father - with whom Mrs Callum was having an affair - took the life of her husband, and in an act of revenge, Grant killed Jeb's family. The night of the massacre Grant's arm was so severely injured that he eventually lost it. Mrs Callum pleads with her brother-in-law to leave Jeb alone, reasoning that he is not a threat to anyone. Grant agrees to let Jeb live to prove to Mrs Callum that one day Jeb will turn on her.

Years later, Jeb, Adam and Thor are adults, and one day in 1898, law officials arrive to recruit volunteers to join the US Army. Jeb and Adam are told that one of them must join. After agreeing on a coin toss, Jeb loses the toss and signs up. He is injured in battle during the Spanish-American War, and while recuperating in the hospital he again experiences flashbacks to the night of his family's murder. Due to his injuries he is honorably discharged from the army and awarded the Medal of Honor.

Jeb and Thor have long been in love. After his homecoming celebration, Jeb tries to persuade Thor to run away with him and get married as soon as possible. He suspects that someone, or something, is following him. Thor refuses, saying that she wishes to get married on her own terms and not out of fear. Jeb goes for a long horse ride to clear his head and stumbles upon an abandoned ranch which he suspects he has seen before. When he returns home, he asks Mrs. Callum if the ranch had anything to do with him and his original family, but she tells him that he has to find his own answers. As Jeb prepares to leave to gamble at the casino in town, Adam shows him the money that had been set aside for him while he was in the army. He also shows Jeb the profits he is entitled to according to their mother's wish that everything be split among the three. However, Adam calls Jeb's share the 'Rand share' and expresses resentment that there should be any money given to Jeb at all. The two come to the conclusion that the ranch is not big enough for both of them, and agree to a coin toss to determine who will leave. Jeb loses; Adam relishes throwing him out and they end up in a fistfight. Jeb declares he will return the next day for Thor and promises that, if Adam tries to stop him, he will kill him.

Jeb has a big win at the casino and the owner, Jake Dingle, offers him a partnership. Meanwhile, Adam ambushes Jeb on his way back from the casino, but is killed by Jeb in self-defense. Jeb is acquitted of the murder in court but is shunned by Thor and Mrs Callum, who state that Jeb is dead to them. With no family, job, or home of his own, Jeb accepts Jake Dingle's offer and becomes part-owner of the casino.

Months later Jeb discovers that Thor is engaged to a man named Prentice and learns that Thor and Prentice will be attending a town dance. Jeb attends the dance and forces Thor to dance with him. Grant Callum goads Prentice to defend Thor's honor and persuades him to make an attempt on Jeb's life. Jake Dingle warns Jeb that Prentice is coming for him. Jeb steps out the back door into the alley in an attempt to avoid the situation, but Prentice is coming down the street. The two engage in a gun battle and Jeb is once again forced to kill in self-defense.

Some time later Thor hatches a plan to gain revenge on Jeb for the pain he has caused them. Thor pretends to forgive Jeb and agrees to marry him, planning to murder him on their wedding night. When the moment arrives, Jeb reveals to her that he knows her plan; she cannot bring herself to carry out the murder and reconciles with him.

Grant Callum rounds up a gang of other Callums and they chase Jeb across the desert, intending to finish the job of killing all the Rands that Callum had begun all those years ago. Jeb finally recalls the night that his father and siblings were murdered, realizing that it was Grant who killed them and that Mrs Callum was there too. Thor learns that her mother had an affair with Jeb's father, and that when Mrs Callum's husband discovered it, he attempted to murder Rand, but was killed himself, resulting in Grant slaughtering Jeb's entire family to avenge his brother's death. On learning that Jeb survived the slaughter, Mrs Callum adopted him, out of guilt. Thor pleads with her mother not to allow Jeb to be hanged, stating there is still time to make up for her actions. As Grant is about to hang Jeb, Mrs Callum shoots him dead. She asks for and receives forgiveness from Jeb and Thor, and advises them to look to the future and enjoy their lives together.

== Cast ==
- Teresa Wright as Thorley "Thor" Callum
- Robert Mitchum as Jeb Rand
- Judith Anderson as Mrs. Callum
- Dean Jagger as Grant Callum
- Alan Hale Sr. as Jake Dingle
- John Rodney as Adam Callum
- Harry Carey, Jr. as Prentice
- Bobby "Bonedust" Young as The Sergeant
- Ernest Severn as Jeb Rand, age 11
- Charles Bates as Adam Callum, age 11
- Peggy Miller as Thor Callum, age 10
- Ian Wolfe as Coroner
- Norman Jolley as A Callum
- Lane Chandler as A Callum
- Elmer Ellingwood as A Callum
- Jack Montgomery as A Callum

== Production ==
The film's writer Niven Busch and leading lady Theresa Wright were married for a decade beginning in 1942. Wright and Robert Mitchum were cast together again seven years after Pursued in Track of the Cat (1954) directed by William A. Wellman, with Mitchum receiving top billing in their second pairing.

Busch later said "I had absolute control over that. And I was very, very happy with the result. I had a marvelous cast, a terrific crew, and the best cameraman in the world [James Wong Howe]. I was very proud of the story; it has kind of Greek overtones—incest feeling, and all that—which the West was like. Greece in the ancient days must have been very much like the West. Passions were powerful and arms were at hand."

Busch based the script on a newspaper story he had read in El Paso Texas about a boy who was the only survivor of a family wiped out in a feud being raised by the family that killed his family. Busch produced the film and secured the services of his wife.

Before Robert Mitchum was cast, a number of actors were discussed for the lead including Robert Taylor, Joel McCrea (who Busch felt was too old for the role), Montgomery Clift (who Wright knew), and Kirk Douglas.

== Reception ==
=== Critical response ===
Film critic Bosley Crowther wrote a mixed review, "... the strange and angry actions which occur through the tortuous wanderings of this drama seem decidedly bewildering and absurd. What's so significant about a fellow—even though he may be a foster-child—finding life slightly oppressive on a primitive New Mexican ranch? ... As we say, without the revelation which comes rather patly at the end, the urgency of these weighty questions is hard to grasp as the picture drones along. And it is likewise hard to work up any sympathy for the hero, who seems bored by all his woes. That may be because Robert Mitchum, who plays the latter, is a very rigid gent and gives off no more animation than a Frigidaire turned to 'Defrost.'"

Variety magazine, on the other hand, praised the film. The Variety staff wrote, "Pursued is potent frontier days Western film fare. Standout in picture is suspense generated by the original script and Raoul Walsh's direction. It builds the western gunman's death walk to high moments of thrill and action. Strong casting also is a decided factor in selling the action wares. Production makes use of natural outdoor backgrounds supplied by New Mexico scenery, lending air of authenticity that is fully captured by the camera."

=== Box office ===
According to Warner Bros records the film earned $2,536,000 domestically and $1,175,000 foreign.
