= Charlie Briggs (actor) =

American actor

- Born: November 13, 1932; Henderson, North Carolina, U.S.
- Died: February 6, 1985 (aged 52); Roswell, Georgia, U.S.
- Occupation: Actor
- Years active: 1958-1983

Charlie Briggs (November 13, 1932 - February 6, 1985) was an American actor. He appeared in numerous films and television shows throughout the 1950s to the 1980s.

== Biography ==
Briggs was born in Henderson, North Carolina in 1932. Briggs began his acting career in 1958, appearing in TV series like Maverick, The Restless Gun, Gunsmoke, The Texan, Bronco and Not for Hire during the late 1950s. During the 1960s he continued to appear in TV series like Cheyenne, Daniel Boone, Bonanza and The Guns of Will Sonnett among others.

During that time he also branched out into film, working in films like The Absent-Minded Professor, Merrill's Marauders, The Beguiled and Charley Varrick. However, he kept working on TV during the 1970s and 1980s, mainly in action series. Briggs last acted in the film Brainstorm in 1983.

Briggs died in 1985, aged 52.

== Filmography ==
=== Film ===
| Year | Title | Role | Notes |
|---|---|---|---|
| 1960 | Home from the Hill | Dick Gibbons | Uncredited |
| 1961 | The Absent-Minded Professor | Sig | |
| 1962 | Merrill's Marauders | Muley | Credited as Charles Briggs |
| 1962 | How the West Was Won | Flying Arrow Barker | Uncredited |
| 1963 | 13 Frightened Girls | Mike | |
| 1963 | Captain Newman, M.D. | Gorkow | Credited as Charles Briggs |
| 1967 | A Time for Killing | Sgt. Kettlinger | |
| 1970 | The Traveling Executioner | Zak | |
| 1971 | The Beguiled | 1st Confederate Captain | Credited as Charles Briggs |
| 1972 | Corky | Red | |
| 1973 | Charley Varrick | Highway Deputy | |
| 1974 | The Klansman | A.P. Reporter | Credited as Charles Briggs |
| 1977 | Greased Lightning | Race Official | Uncredited |
| 1977 | The Lincoln Conspiracy | Andrew Potter | |
| 1979 | Norma Rae | Warren Latting | |
| 1982 | Six Pack | Steward #1 | |
| 1983 | Brainstorm | Colonel Easterbrook | Final film role |

=== Television ===
| Year | Title | Role | Notes |
|---|---|---|---|
| 1958 | Maverick | Little Jeb Plummer | Episode: "Alias Bart Maverick"; credited as Charles Briggs |
| 1958 | The Restless Gun | Meacham | Episode: "Bonner's Squaw"; credited as Charles F. Briggs |
| 1958 | The Texan | Jeff Karger | Episode: "A Time of the Year" |
| 1959 | Bronco | Sergeant Tatum | Episode: "The Burning Springs" |
| 1959 | Not for Hire | O'Hara | Episode: "The Fall Guy" |
| 1959–1960 | Laramie | Charley Wilkes / Will / Blacksmith | 3 episodes; uncredited for 1 episode |
| 1959–1962 | Lawman | Darrel Martin / Falk - Henchman / Logan Jutes | 3 episodes |
| 1960 | Tightrope | Hank | Episode: "Broken Rope"; uncredited |
| 1960 | The Deputy | Bill Dawson | Episode: "The Hidden Motive" |
| 1960 | Shotgun Slade | | Episode: "The Swindle" |
| 1960 | Law of the Plainsman | Bob Erby | Episode: "Stella" |
| 1960 | Black Saddle | Walsh | Episode: "End of the Line" |
| 1960–1961 | Zane Grey Theatre | Russ / Paul - West | 2 episodes |
| 1960–1961 | The Rifleman | Artie Quint / Eli Manse | 2 episodes |
| 1960–1962 | Cheyenne | Obed Durango / Bart Hanson | 2 episodes |
| 1961 | The Magical World of Disney | Folger Selby | 2 episodes |
| 1961 | Perry Mason | Policeman | Episode: "The Case of the Barefaced Witness" |
| 1961 | The Life and Legend of Wyatt Earp | Willy Davis | Episode: "A Papa for Butch and Ginger" |
| 1961 | Outlaws | Maury Kelly | Episode: "The Brothers" |
| 1961–1964 | Wagon Train | Joe Weaver / Ed Linders | 2 episodes |
| 1961–1965 | Death Valley Days | Little Mae / Sam Dowd | 2 episodes |
| 1962 | National Velvet | Morton | Episode: "Ede's Bombshell" |
| 1962 | Route 66 | Jed | Episode: "Love Is a Skinny Kid" |
| 1962 | Tales of Wells Fargo | Andy Stone | Episode: "Don't Wake a Tiger" |
| 1962 | Shannon | | Episode: "End of the Line" |
| 1962 | You're Only Young Once | Piggy Burke | TV movie |
| 1962–1965 | Bonanza | Charlie Fitch | 2 episodes |
| 1962–1970 | The Virginian | Verne / Hank Stram / Hard Pan / Soapy | 4 episodes |
| 1963 | The Eleventh Hour | Red | Episode: "Which Man Will Die?"; credited as Charles Briggs |
| 1963 | The Gallant Men | Pvt. Eddie Ross | Episode: "A Taste of Peace" |
| 1963 | Gunsmoke | Riley / Driver | 2 episodes |
| 1964 | Daniel Boone | Hiram Girty | Episode: "A Short Walk to Salem" |
| 1965 | Kraft Suspense Theatre | Boone Trimble | Episode: "Jungle of Fear" |
| 1965 | A Man Called Shenandoah | Tibbott | Episode: "The Siege"; credited as Charles Briggs |
| 1966 | The Big Valley | Sheriff Walt Baker | Episode: "The Martyr" |
| 1966 | Laredo | Woods | Episode: "Road to San Remo" |
| 1967–1968 | The Guns of Will Sonnett | Lyle Merceen / Peerce - Posse Member | 2 episodes |
| 1968 | The Outcasts | Link | Episode: "The Night Riders" |
| 1969 | Land of the Giants | Guard | Episode: "Deadly Pawn" |
| 1969 | The Ballad of Andy Crocker | Mr. Paisley | ABC Movie of the Week |
| 1969–1970 | Lancer | Thede / John Mason | 2 episodes |
| 1969–1971 | Mod Squad | Cates / Red | 2 episodes |
| 1971 | Alias Smith and Jones | Red Mattson | Episode: "Return to Devil's Hole" |
| 1971 | This Is the Life | Tank | Episode: "The Football Player" |
| 1974 | Harry O | Policeman in Galveston | Episode: "Accounts Balanced" |
| 1975 | The Hatfields and the McCoys | First Deputy | TV movie |
| 1975 | Barnaby Jones | Oscar Fry | Episode: "Beware the Dog" |
| 1976 | S.W.A.T. | Sheriff Thad Grover | 2 episodes |
| 1978 | Roll of Thunder, Hear My Cry | Kaleb Wallace | TV movie; credited as Charles Briggs |
| 1978 | A Real American Hero | Miles Conway | TV movie |
| 1981 | Ramblin' Man | | Episode: "Two Hundred Miles from Noplace" |
