= Breakthrough (1950 film) =

1950 film by Lewis Seiler

- Original film poster
- Directed by: Lewis Seiler
- Written by: Joseph Breen Jr. Bernard Girard; Ted Sherdeman
- Produced by: Bryan Foy
- Starring: John Agar; David Brian; Frank Lovejoy
- Narrated by: Frank Lovejoy
- Cinematography: Edwin DuPar
- Edited by: Folmar Blangsted
- Music by: William Lava
- Production company: Warner Bros. Pictures
- Distributed by: Warner Bros. Pictures
- Release dates: November 8, 1950 (Los Angeles); November 17, 1950 (New York); 1950
- Running time: 91 minutes
- Country: United States
- Language: English
- Budget: $784,000
- Box office: $3,015,000 $1,900,000 (US rentals)

Breakthrough is a 1950 American war film directed by Lewis Seiler and starring John Agar about an American infantry unit in World War II. Approximately one-third of the film was assembled from preexisting footage.

== Plot ==
Captain Hale leads a company of infantrymen from the 1st Infantry Division from the D-Day landings through the Normandy campaign. They resent the presence of fresh lieutenant Joe Mallory.

== Cast ==
- David Brian as Capt. Tom Hale
- John Agar as Lt. Joe Mallory
- Frank Lovejoy as platoon Sgt. Pete Bell
- William Campbell as Cpl. Danny Dominick (as Bill Campbell)
- Paul Picerni as Pvt. Edward P. Rojeck
- Greg McClure as Pvt. Frank Finley
- Richard Monahan as Pvt. 'Four-Eff' Nelson
- Edward Norris as Sgt. Roy Henderson (as Eddie Norris)
- Matt Willis as Pvt. Jumbo Hollis
- Dick Wesson as Pvt. Sammy Hansen
- Suzanne Dalbert as Collette
- William Self as Pvt. George Glasheen
- Danny Arnold as Pvt. Rothman
- Danni Sue Nolan as Lt. Janis King
- Howard Negley as Lt. Col. John Lewis
- Drue Mallory as Betsy

== Production ==
The picture includes official American and British military films as well as captured German footage. Some scenes were filmed on location at Fort Ord near Monterey, California.

== Release ==
The world premiere of Breakthrough was held at the Warner Hollywood Theatre on November 8, 1950. Los Angeles County proclaimed the day as "Breakthrough Day".

The screening was preceded by a military parade down Hollywood Boulevard that included infantry units, Sherman tanks, a color guard, searchlight batteries, a military police detachment and a band from Marine Corps Air Station El Toro.

Approximately 75 film stars attended, many of whom arrived in military jeeps. Representatives of 44 foreign nations were invited, as were many prominent war correspondents, government officials and civic leaders. The festivities were hosted by masters of ceremonies Gordon MacRae and Frank Lovejoy.

== Reception ==
In a contemporary review for The New York Times, critic Bosley Crowther wrote:

It is hard to tell from "Breakthrough" ... whether the people at Warner Brothers who made this big war film are trying to get across the notion that war is hell or swell. Part of the time in this picture about the experiences of an infantry platoon in the Normandy campaign of the last war the screen is ablaze with strife and din. Soldiers crouch behind the hedgerows, machine guns ratchet fearsomely, tanks close in slowly, spewing torment, and bazookas blast at them. The world is full of explosives, men fall and war looks mighty grim. And then, all of a sudden, the scene changes. The men of our infantry platoon are sitting up behind the hedgerows and having a quite convivial time. The inevitable kid from Brooklyn is passing salami around, the tough sergeant is boiling a chicken in his helmet and the big, kind bohunk is worrying about a dog. Or the boys have advanced upon a village, where there are French girls and dancing in the streets, and the chap who is always boasting of his muscles is being attacked by a predatory miss. The best way to take this picture is as an obvious glamorization of war, mixed with abundant scenes of battle and some starkly realistic news footage. For, while some fellows in our gang are killed or wounded, the most important and conspicuous ones survive. And they are all cut from long familiar stencils and go through the same old routines. The consequence is a picture without military fidelity or dramatic point.

Critic Edwin Schallert of the Los Angeles Times wrote:

"Nobody walked across Normandy; they crawled," says a commentator during the unreeling of "Breakthrough," and Warner Bros., in producing this picture, apparently did everything to prove that such was the case. This Brian Foy feature ... is a hard-hitting, vigorous sketch of the D-day invasion, which looks as if it might have been shot right on the terrain. Much of it is in fact, supplemented with newsreel shots, well blended in, which helps the impression of the real action of war. On this account "Breakthrough" merits a tribute. It is an excellent film of battle, without folderol. It might even have emerged from the March of Time precincts, because it has that eyewitness documentary quality. It is neither a big nor a pretentious picture in story values, but it is considerable of a production in its actual battle stuff. Whether it connotes entertainment might be a question. It will have to be appreciated for its realistic values, and it offers plenty of these.

The film was profitable, earning $2,095,000 domestically and $920,000 foreign.
