= United States Pictures =

Motion picture production company

United States Pictures (also known as United States Productions) was the name of the motion picture production company belonging to Milton Sperling who was Harry Warner's (of the Warner Bros. studio) son-in-law.

== History ==
Sperling was a highly experienced screenwriter and producer with 20th Century Fox and other studios who had just returned from his World War II service in the U.S. Marine Corps Photographic Unit. Warner Bros. offered Sperling an independent production company that would use Warner Bros. studio resources and financing to make motion pictures that would be released by the studio. In the post World War II era, the Hollywood major studios were beginning to find the idea of purchasing completed motion pictures from independent film production companies more economical than producing the films themselves (although United Artists had done this decades earlier, acting as a distributor for independent films since its establishment in 1919).

Beginning with Fritz Lang's Cloak and Dagger (1946), followed by Raoul Walsh's Pursued (1947), Sperling's United States Pictures made a total of 14 films. During production of Pursued, in September 1946 Sperling became sole owner of the company following a split with Joe Bernard. The company had a two picture a year deal with Warners.

The last two films of the studio, Samuel Fuller's Merrill's Marauders (1962) and Ken Annakin's Battle of the Bulge (1965) were filmed in the Philippines and Spain respectively. Sperling found that the Filipino and Spanish governments and film companies thought they were dealing with a branch of the United States Government due to the name of the company and provided superb cooperation.

The pre-1960 film library was first sold to Jayark Films in 1960, then these were sold, along with the Cagney Enterprises and Venus films that Jayark bought, to Golden Arrow Films in 1965, and finally they sell the group to Richard Feiner & Company in 1969, before transferring to Republic Pictures in 1986. Feiner subsequently sued Paramount Pictures in 2011, and the case was settled in 2013.

== Filmography ==
The United States Pictures marked with an (*) signifies Milton Sperling contributed to the screenplay.

- Cloak and Dagger (1946) - directed by Fritz Lang
- Pursued (1947) - directed by Raoul Walsh
- My Girl Tisa (1948) - directed by Elliott Nugent
- South of St. Louis (1949) - directed by Ray Enright
- Three Secrets (1950) - directed by Robert Wise
- The Enforcer (1951) - directed by Bretaigne Windust & Raoul Walsh (uncredited)
- Distant Drums (1951) - directed by Raoul Walsh
- Retreat, Hell! (1952) - directed by Joseph H. Lewis*
- Blowing Wild (1953) - directed by Hugo Fregonese
- The Court-Martial of Billy Mitchell (1955) - directed by Otto Preminger*
- The Rise and Fall of Legs Diamond (1960) - directed by Budd Boetticher
- The Bramble Bush (1960) - directed by Daniel Petrie*
- Merrill's Marauders (1962) - directed by Samuel Fuller*
- Battle of the Bulge (1965) - directed by Ken Annakin*
