= Don Wilbanks =

- Don Wilbanks in Tate 1960
- Born: Thomas Donald Wilbanks; October 4, 1926; Holdenville, Oklahoma, USA
- Died: July 26, 2013 (aged 86)
- Years active: 1955–1977

Don Wilbanks (born Thomas Donald Wilbanks, October 4, 1926 – July 26, 2013) was an American actor who appeared in television series including Rawhide, Tate, Twilight Zone, Tales of Wells Fargo, Laramie, Bat Masterson, The Life and Legend of Wyatt Earp, Bonanza, Cheyenne, Convoy, Rango,Mayberry R.F.D., The Guns of Will Sonnett, 77 Sunset Strip, Ironside, Mod Squad, Lancer, The Virginian (renamed The Men from Shiloh in later credits), Charlie's Angels, and Lawman, among others.

Wilbanks was born in Holdenville, Oklahoma, and moved to California to live with his mother when his father was called to active military duty at the outbreak of World War II (1939). After the war, he attended Montana State University, where he was a notable player on the football team. After being invited to join Drury Lane Theater, an amateur theater group in San Diego, he decided to leave his successful service station business, and moved to North Hollywood in 1955 with his young family to start his professional acting career. Wilbanks was first cast as an extra in several movies and television shows. His first credited role came in the 1958 episode of Tales of Wells Fargo titled "The Sooners". Additional roles came in mostly other Western TV shows throughout the 1960s.

Wilbanks died on July 26, 2013.

== Television ==
- 1969 : The Virginian (TV series) : season 7 episode 21 (Eileen) : Brady
- 1970 : The Virginian (TV series) : (Men of Shiloh) season 9 episode 01 (The West vs. Colonel MacKenzie) : Meyers
