= Holy Cross Cemetery =

Holy Cross Cemetery may refer to:

== United States ==
=== California ===
- Holy Cross Cemetery (Colma, California)
- Holy Cross Cemetery, Culver City, California
- Holy Cross Cemetery (Menlo Park, California)
- Holy Cross Cemetery (Pomona, California)
- Holy Cross Cemetery (San Diego), Chollas View neighborhood, San Diego, California

=== Illinois ===
- Holy Cross Cemetery, Calumet City, Illinois

=== Massachusetts ===
- Holy Cross Cemetery (Malden, Massachusetts)

=== Michigan ===
- Holy Cross Cemetery, Detroit, Michigan

=== Montana ===
- Holy Cross Cemetery (Broadwater County, Montana)
- Holy Cross Cemetery (Silver Bow County, Montana)
- Holy Cross Cemetery (Yellowstone County, Montana)

=== New Jersey ===
- Holy Cross Cemetery (North Arlington, New Jersey)

=== New York ===
- Holy Cross Cemetery, Brooklyn, New York, New York
- Holy Cross Cemetery, Lackawanna, New York

=== Ohio ===
- Holy Cross Cemetery (Brook Park, Ohio)

=== Pennsylvania ===
- Holy Cross Cemetery, Harrisburg, Pennsylvania
- Holy Cross Cemetery (Yeadon, Pennsylvania)

=== Virginia ===
- Holy Cross Cemetery, Lynchburg, Virginia

=== Wisconsin ===
- Holy Cross Cemetery (Milwaukee), Wisconsin

== Canada ==
- Holy Cross Cemetery (Edmonton), Alberta, Canada
- Holy Cross Cemetery (Halifax, Nova Scotia), Canada
- Holy Cross Cemetery, Thornhill, Ontario, Canada

== Elsewhere ==
- Holy Cross Catholic Cemetery, a private cemetery in Cape Collinson, Hong Kong
- Žale, formerly known as Holy Cross Cemetery, in Ljubljana, Slovenia
- Holy Cross Cemetery, Berlin-Mariendorf, Germany
- Holy Cross Cemetery, Salta, Argentina; Spanish: Cementerio de la Santa Cruz
- Holy Cross Memorial Park, Quezon City, Philippines; sometimes called Holy Cross Cemetery
