= Jack Williams (stuntman) =

American actor and stuntman

Jack Williams (April 15, 1921 in Butte, Montana – April 10, 2007 in Sylmar, California) was an American stunt performer and actor specialising in horse stunts and Western films and television shows.

== Biography ==
Williams's father, George Williams, was a Montana cowboy. His mother, Paris Williams, was a world-champion trick rider on the rodeo circuit and a movie stuntwoman. The Williams family moved to Burbank, California during Jack's childhood years. He performed his first motion picture stunt on a horse at age 4, being tossed from one rider to another in The Flaming Forest a 1926 silent film. Attending the University of Southern California, Williams was a polo player and returned to motion picture stuntwork in 1936 for Daniel Boone and The Charge of the Light Brigade.

World War II interrupted his Hollywood career when he served as an officer in the United States Coast Guard that included service as a navigator on a Landing Ship, Tank in the Invasion of Okinawa.

Williams returned to Hollywood after the war where for six decades he doubled for or worked with many actors. Among the films he provided stunts for were The Last Outpost, Bugles in the Afternoon, Bend of the River, The Far Country, Yellowstone Kelly, Rio Bravo, The Alamo, The Magnificent Seven, Merrill's Marauders, How the West Was Won, Cheyenne Autumn, Major Dundee, Cat Ballou, The Professionals, Alvarez Kelly, The Sons of Katie Elder, The War Wagon and many more up to the 1999 film Wild Wild West. On television Williams worked on The Roy Rogers Show, Maverick, Rawhide, Bonanza, Daniel Boone, Laredo and The High Chaparral.

=== Horse training ===
Williams was inspired by his father, George Williams, a Montana cowboy who could train a horse to fall on cue. Jack recalled, "There was probably no feat I could have imagined that was as fascinating as that. So I took the technique and perfected it."

"He was the top falling-horse stuntman in the business," said stuntman Bob Hoy, who first worked with Williams in 1950. "He had a great horse called Coco, and they were inseparable. The horse had an instinct. A lot of horses will fight you when you get to the spot where they'll make the fall and won't go there. But Coco went there. She was just so great."

Said stuntman Joe Canutt: "You can get great falls a lot of times out of horses, but when you're attacking the Alamo, for example, and you've got bombs and cannons going off ... some of them don't work at all. That mare [Coco] consistently got spectacular falls." But beyond doing the falling-horse stunt, Hoy said, "Jack drove stagecoaches, he wrecked wagons, he could transfer from the horse to the train -- he could do anything pertaining to horse work." Coco died at age 33 and was buried on Williams' California ranch.

== Filmography ==
| Year | Title | Role | Notes |
|---|---|---|---|
| 1945 | Give Me the Stars | Syd | |
| 1952 | Talk About a Stranger | Truck Driver | Voice, Uncredited |
| 1952 | The Lion and the Horse | Steve Collier | |
| 1953 | Safari Drums | Native | Uncredited |
| 1954 | The Far Country | Shep | Uncredited |
| 1955 | Strange Lady in Town | Rebstock | Uncredited |
| 1956 | Backlash | Castro | Uncredited |
| 1956 | The Burning Hills | Farrell | Uncredited |
| 1957 | Band of Angels | Runaway | Uncredited |
| 1958 | Man of the West | Alcutt | Uncredited |
| 1959 | Westbound | Henchman | Uncredited |
| 1960 | Spartacus | Soldier | Uncredited |
| 1960 | The Alamo | Bowie's Man | Uncredited |
| 1961 | Gold of the Seven Saints | Ames | |
| 1962 | The Man Who Shot Liberty Valance | Henchman | Uncredited |
| 1962 | Hatari! | Man | Uncredited |
| 1964 | Cheyenne Autumn | Trooper | Uncredited |
| 1965 | The Sons of Katie Elder | Andy Sharp | Uncredited |
| 1966 | Billy the Kid Versus Dracula | Duffy | |
| 1966 | Smoky | Cowboy | |
| 1966 | Daniel Boone: Frontier Trail Rider | Larson | |
| 1968 | The Scalphunters | Scalphunter | |
| 1969 | The Wild Bunch | Phil | Uncredited |
| 1969 | Paint Your Wagon | Miner | Uncredited |
| 2004 | Big Chuck, Little Chuck | Himself | (final film role) |
