= Milton Sperling =

American film producer (1912–1988)

- Born: July 6, 1912; New York City, U.S.
- Died: August 26, 1988 (aged 76); Los Angeles, California, U.S.
- Education: City College of New York
- Occupations: Film producer Screenwriter
- Years active: 1936–1971
- Spouse: Betty Warner
- Family: Harry Warner (father-in-law); Cole Hauser (grandson)

Milton Sperling (July 6, 1912 – August 26, 1988) was an American film producer and screenwriter for 20th Century Fox and Warner Bros., where he had his own independent production unit, United States Pictures. He was nominated for an Academy Award for co-writing The Court-Martial of Billy Mitchell (1955), served as a United States Marine Corps officer in the Photographic Unit during World War II, and was a founding member of the Writers Guild of America.

== Biography ==
Sperling, who was of Jewish heritage, was born in New York City to Charles Sperling and Bessie Diamond. After leaving the City College of New York, Sperling entered the film industry by working at Paramount's Astoria Studios as a shipping clerk. He later became a personal secretary for Darryl F. Zanuck and Hal Wallis at Warner Bros. in 1931. After Zanuck resigned his position as Head of Production of Warner Bros. studios in 1933 and was offered a position with Twentieth Century Pictures (later merged with Fox Pictures), Sperling became an assistant to Edward Small, an independent film producer who released his Reliance Pictures and Edward Small Productions through United Artists. Sperling learned as much about an independent low-budget film production unit as he had about high-budget major studio films from Zanuck and Wallis at Warner Bros.

Zanuck hired Sperling for his combined 20th Century Fox, where Sperling's first screenplay Sing, Baby, Sing was released in 1936. Sperling later did more screenwriting, credited and uncredited, for 20th Century Fox, becoming a film producer in 1941, with his first productions being Sun Valley Serenade then I Wake Up Screaming, both in 1941.

Though now working for Fox, in 1936, Sperling was introduced to Harry Warner's (of the Warner brothers) 16-year-old daughter Betty Warner. This match was arranged by Betty Warner's older sister, Doris. After an on-and-off relationship of three years, Betty and Sperling married on July 13, 1939.

In 1941, Sperling was an associate producer on the US Marine Corps Technicolor romantic military film comedy To the Shores of Tripoli and quickly filmed a new ending, showing John Payne hearing the news about the attack and reenlisting in the Marines. Sperling also enlisted in the Marines with orders to attend Military Intelligence school but still had several films to complete before leaving the studio. The US Marine Corps used Sperling's film expertise by assigning him to the US Marine Corps Photographic Unit, where he produced the documentaries The Battle for The Marianas (1944) and the Technicolor To the Shores of Iwo Jima (1945), filmed up front with the Marines in their Pacific Island campaigns, where several combat cameramen lost their lives shooting the footage.

Returning from the war, Zanuck offered Sperling his old job back but father-in-law Harry Warner told Sperling that a member of the family should not work for a rival studio, offering him an independent production unit where he could make the films he wanted.

After World War II, the major studios were looking at studios that only financed and released films such as United Artists and Monogram Pictures and decided that hiring stars, directors, and film crews on a picture-by-picture basis would be more economical, especially with the problems with the trade unions the major studios were having.

Sperling named his company "United States Pictures" with his first of 14 films released under the label being Cloak and Dagger. The company was formed in 1945 in partnership with Joseph Bernhard, and had a two-picture-a-year arrangement with Warner Bros.; Sperling became sole owner in September 1946 after the partnership was dissolved during production of Pursued. Sperling contributed to the screenplays on several of these films, including The Court-Martial of Billy Mitchell (1955) that was nominated for an Academy Award for Best Original Writing, Story and Screenplay. The nomination, at the 28th Academy Awards, was shared with his co-writer Emmet Lavery. Sperling also produced other films not under the United States Pictures label such as Top Secret Affair (1957), filmed in England, and Marjorie Morningstar (1958).

The final United States Pictures film was Battle of the Bulge, filmed in Spain in 1965. Sperling later produced a Spanish made "Spaghetti Western" with Lee Van Cleef in the role of Captain Apache (1971), then several television movies until his death from cancer in 1988. He was buried at Mount Sinai Memorial Park, in Los Angeles.

The actor Cole Hauser is a grandson of Milton Sperling.
