= List of awards and nominations received by Billy Wilder =

List of Billy Wilder awards
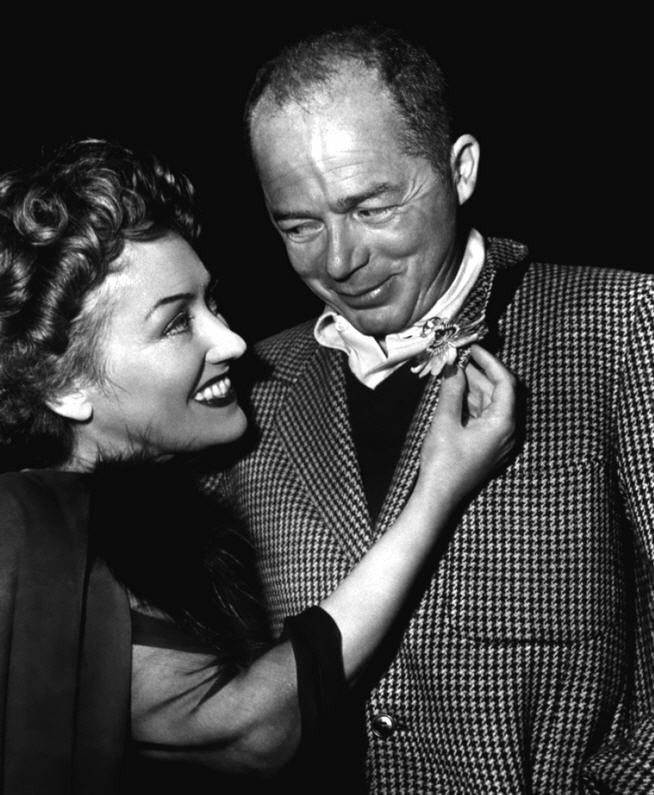
- Photo of Gloria Swanson with Billy Wilder in 1950.
Award	Wins	Nominations
Academy Award	6	21
British Academy Film Award	1	5
Golden Globe Award	1	10
Directors Guild Award	3	6
Producers Guild Award	3	6
Writers Guild Award	3	6

The following is a list of awards and nominations received by American filmmaker Billy Wilder.

Wilder was an American film writer, director, producer, with a Hollywood career that spanned over five decades, and is regarded as one of the most brilliant and versatile filmmakers for Classical Hollywood cinema. His most recognized films include: the crime noir Double Indemnity (1944), the film noir The Lost Weekend (1945), the black comedy Sunset Boulevard (1950), the newspaper drama Ace in the Hole (1951), the war film Stalag 17 (1953), the romance Sabrina (1954), the comedy The Seven Year Itch (1955), the epic The Spirit of St. Louis, the romantic comedy Love in the Afternoon, and the courtroom drama Witness for the Prosecution (all 1957), as well as gender bending comedy Some Like It Hot (1959), and the romance drama The Apartment (1960).

Over his distinguished and varied career as a director he has received 21 Academy Award nominations winning six awards for The Lost Weekend, Sunset Boulevard, and The Apartment. He also earned two British Academy Film Award nominations and a win for The Apartment as well as seven Golden Globe Award nominations winning twice for The Lost Weekend and Sunset Boulevard. He has also received 5 Writers Guild of America Award wins as well as the Cannes Film Festival's prestigious Palme d'Or for The Lost Weekend in 1945 and the Venice Film Festival award for Best Director for Ace in the Hole.

He has also received various honorary awards, and tributes including the Academy of Motion Pictures Arts and Sciences' Irving G. Thalberg Memorial Award in 1987, and the BAFTA Fellowship in 1995. He has also received the Directors Guild of America Lifetime Achievement Award, the Producers Guild of America's David O. Selznick Achievement Award and two Laurel Awards for Screenwriting Achievements from the Writers Guild of America. He has also been honored with a Gala Tribute at Film at Lincoln Center (1982), the American Film Institute's Life Achievement Award (1986), Berlin International Film Festival's Honorary Golden Bear (1993), the Kennedy Center Honors (1990), and a National Endowment for the Arts (1993).

== Major associations ==
=== Academy Awards ===
Year	Category	Nominated work	Result	Ref.
1940	Best Screenplay	Ninotchka	Nominated	
1942	Best Story	Ball of Fire	Nominated	
1942	Best Screenplay	Hold Back the Dawn	Nominated	
1945	Best Director	Double Indemnity	Nominated	
1945	Best Screenplay	Double Indemnity	Nominated	
1946	Best Director	The Lost Weekend	Won	
1946	Best Screenplay	The Lost Weekend	Won	
1949	Best Screenplay	A Foreign Affair	Nominated	
1951	Best Director	Sunset Boulevard	Nominated	
1951	Best Original Screenplay	Sunset Boulevard	Won	
1952	Best Original Screenplay	Ace in the Hole	Nominated	
1954	Best Director	Stalag 17	Nominated	
1955	Best Director	Sabrina	Nominated	
1955	Best Screenplay	Sabrina	Nominated	
1958	Best Director	Witness for the Prosecution	Nominated	
1960	Best Director	Some Like It Hot	Nominated	
1960	Best Screenplay	Some Like It Hot	Nominated	
1961	Best Picture	The Apartment	Won	
1961	Best Director	The Apartment	Won	
1961	Best Original Screenplay	The Apartment	Won	
1967	Best Original Screenplay	The Fortune Cookie	Nominated	
1988	Irving G. Thalberg Memorial Award		Won	

=== British Academy Film Awards ===
Year	Category	Nominated work	Result	Ref.
1960	Best Film	Some Like It Hot	Nominated	
1961	Best Film	The Apartment	Won	
1995	BAFTA Fellowship		Won	

=== Golden Globe Awards ===
Year	Category	Nominated work	Result	Ref.
1946	Best Director	The Lost Weekend	Won	
1951	Best Director	Sunset Boulevard	Won	
1951	Best Screenplay	Sunset Boulevard	Nominated	
1958	Best Director	Witness for the Prosecution	Nominated	
1961	Best Director	The Apartment	Nominated	
1973	Best Director	Avanti!	Nominated	
1973	Best Screenplay	Avanti!	Nominated	

== Guild awards ==
=== Directors Guild of America ===
Year	Category	Nominated work	Result	Ref.
1950	Outstanding Directing – Feature Film	Sunset Boulevard	Nominated	
1953	Outstanding Directing – Feature Film	Stalag 17	Nominated	
1954	Outstanding Directing – Feature Film	Sabrina	Nominated	
1956	Outstanding Directing – Feature Film	The Seven Year Itch	Nominated	
1957	Outstanding Directing – Feature Film	Love in the Afternoon	Nominated	
1957	Outstanding Directing – Feature Film	Witness for the Prosecution	Nominated	
1959	Outstanding Directing – Feature Film	Some Like It Hot	Nominated	
1960	Outstanding Directing – Feature Film	The Apartment	Won	
1984	D.W. Griffith Award		Won	
1990	Preston Sturges Award		Won	

=== Producers Guild of America ===
Year	Category	Nominated work	Result	Ref.
1997	David O. Selznick Achievement Award		Won	

=== Writers Guild of America ===
Year	Category	Nominated work	Result	Ref.
1951	Best Written Drama	Sunset Boulevard	Won	
1955	Best Written Comedy	Sabrina	Won	
1957	Laurel Award for Screenwriting Achievement		Won	
1958	Best Written Comedy	Love in the Afternoon	Won	
1960	Best Written Comedy	Some Like It Hot	Won	
1961	Best Written Comedy	The Apartment	Won	
1980	Laurel Award for Screenwriting Achievement		Won	

== Festival awards ==
=== Cannes Film Festival ===
Year	Category	Nominated work	Result	Ref.
1946	Palme d'Or	The Lost Weekend	Won	

=== Venice Film Festival ===
Year	Category	Nominated work	Result	Ref.
1951	International Award for Best Director	Ace in the Hole	Won	

== Critics awards ==
New York Film Critics Circle Awards

Year	Category	Nominated work	Result	Ref.
1944	Best Director	Double Indemnity	Nominated	
1946	Best Director	The Lost Weekend	Won	
1950	Best Director	Sunset Boulevard	Nominated	
1960	Best Director	The Apartment	Won	
1960	Best Screenplay	The Apartment	Won	
1960	Best Film	The Apartment	Won	
1961	Best Director	One, Two, Three	Nominated	

== Honorary awards ==
Year	Award	Category	Result	Ref.
1982	Film at Lincoln Center	Gala tribute	Won	
1986	American Film Institute	Life Achievement Award	Won	
1993	Berlin International Film Festival	Honorary Golden Bear	Won	
1990	John F. Kennedy Center for the Performing Arts	Kennedy Center Honors	Won	
1993	National Endowment for the Arts	National Medal of Arts	Won	
