= Sons and Lovers (film) =

1960 British film by Jack Cardiff

- Theatrical release poster
- Directed by: Jack Cardiff
- Written by: Gavin Lambert; T. E. B. Clarke
- Based on: Sons and Lovers (1913 novel) by D. H. Lawrence
- Produced by: Jerry Wald
- Starring: Trevor Howard; Dean Stockwell; Wendy Hiller; Mary Ure; Heather Sears
- Cinematography: Freddie Francis
- Edited by: Gordon Pilkington
- Music by: Mario Nascimbene
- Production company: Jerry Wald Productions
- Distributed by: 20th Century Fox
- Release dates: 14 May 1960 (Cannes); 23 June 1960 (U.K.)
- Running time: 103 minutes
- Country: United Kingdom
- Language: English
- Budget: $805,000 or $535,000
- Box office: $1,500,000 (US/Canada rentals) $800,000 (UK rentals)

Sons and Lovers is a 1960 British period drama film directed by Jack Cardiff, adapted by Gavin Lambert and T. E. B. Clarke from D. H. Lawrence's 1913 semi-autobiographical novel. It stars Trevor Howard, Dean Stockwell, Wendy Hiller, Mary Ure, and Heather Sears.

Set and filmed in the East Midlands of England, the film centres on a young man (Stockwell) with artistic talent who lives in a close-knit coal-mining town during the early 20th century, and finds himself inhibited by his emotionally manipulative, domineering mother (Hiller)—a literary, psychological interpretation of the Oedipus story.

Premiering at the 1960 Cannes Film Festival, the film was well received by critics and a commercial success. At the 33rd Academy Awards, it won Best Cinematography – Black-and-White and was nominated in six other categories, including Best Picture, Best Director, Best Actor (for Howard), and Best Supporting Actress (for Ure). For his work on the film, Jack Cardiff won the Golden Globe Award for Best Director and the National Board of Review Award for Best Director.

== Plot ==
East Midlands housewife Gertrude Morel is miserable in her marriage to Walter, a coal miner who drinks heavily and sometimes shows his bitterness in violent ways. She has placed her hopes on her son Paul, who has the talent and ambition to become an artist, a dream that is mocked by Walter. Paul finds his desire to escape to a different life sidetracked by his mother's possessiveness, as well as by local girl Miriam Leivers, with whom he has an intellectual relationship that he would like to become physical. Miriam, however, is torn between her feelings and the views of her mother, who views sex as sinful and dirty.

Paul's brother Arthur dies in a mining accident, and the Morel's eldest son, William, returns home for the funeral. As William's train back to London is about to depart, he reveals that he is engaged to be married to a pretty woman from an affluent family, a woman who the Morels later learn is the temperamental opposite of Gertrude—light-spirited, and not particularly passionate or intellectual.

When a sketch Paul made of his father is exhibited in Nottingham, he overhears a wealthy art patron criticize the work, but the man later comes to the Morel house to offer to pay for Paul to attend art school in London, as he recognizes Paul's potential as an artist. Excited, Paul tells Miriam, but she rejects his physical advances. When Paul gets home, his parents have just had a violent confrontation, and he decides to forego art school, as he cannot bear to leave his mother alone with his father.

Paul takes a job in a local lace factory, where he becomes enchanted with Clara Dawes, a "liberated" feminist co-worker who is separated—but not divorced—from her husband, Baxter. Nonetheless, he continues seeing Miriam, and she finally agrees to have sex with him, but he immediately regrets convincing her to do so, as she did not seem to enjoy the experience, and he decides to stop seeing her. He and Clara begin a passionate affair, but he is not able to totally commit himself to her, in large part due to his mother's emotional hold on him.

While Paul and Claire are away on a trip to the seaside, Baxter confronts Walter in a pub and tells him to keep Paul away from Claire. Walter blames Gertrude's clinginess for preventing Paul from being able to have a normal romantic relationship with a woman his age, but Gertrude says all she ever wanted was for Paul to be happy. Baxter is waiting for Paul when he returns from the trip, and, although Baxter wins the fight, he is injured. Clara, who has noted Paul's emotional distance, returns to her husband to nurse him back to health.

Gertrude has not seemed well recently, and, one evening, Paul comes home to discover that she has had a heart attack. She says she no longer wishes to see Walter, as she wants to remember the days when they were in love and not be reminded of all of the negative aspects of their current relationship. She dies early the next morning, and Walter tells Paul to not let her down like he did, encouraging him to go to London and, hopefully, find some happiness.

On a walk in the woods, Paul meets Miriam. She apologizes for his loss, and they learn that they are both going to London—Paul to attend art school, and Miriam to train to be a teacher. She suggests they marry so she can care for him, but Paul rejects her proposal, telling her that, after having belonged to his mother, he wants to stay free so he can learn "what it means to live."

== Cast ==
- Trevor Howard as Walter Morel
- Dean Stockwell as Paul Morel
- Wendy Hiller as Gertrude Morel
- Mary Ure as Clara Dawes (née Radford)
- Heather Sears as Miriam Leivers
- William Lucas as William Morel
- Conrad Phillips as Baxter Dawes
- Ernest Thesiger as Mr. Hadlock
- Donald Pleasence as Pappleworth
- Rosalie Crutchley as Mrs. Leivers
- Sean Barrett as Arthur Morel
- Elizabeth Begley as Mrs. Radford
- Edna Morris as Mrs. Anthony, a neighbour
- Ruth Kettlewell as Mrs. Bonner, a suffragette
- Anne Sheppard as Rose
- Susan Travers as Betty
- Rosalie Ashley as Louisa Weston, William's fiancée
- Dorothy Gordon as Fanny
- Vilma Ann Leslie as Connie
- Anne Scott as Beatrice
- Patsy Smart as Emma
- Gwendolyn Watts as May
- Philip Ray as Dr. Ansell
- Trevor Little as comedian
- Sheila Bernette as Polly

== Production ==
=== Development ===
American producer Jerry Wald had purchased the film rights to D. H. Lawrence's novel Sons and Lovers in the 1950s, intending to produce the film in the United States, with Montgomery Clift as Paul Morel and Marilyn Monroe as one of his girlfriends. When Clift's casting fell through, Wald approached James Dean, but Dean's death put the project on hold for several years, after which Wald decided it would be better for the film to be produced in the UK.

=== Casting ===
Dean Stockwell, whose performance was the most heavily criticised in reviews of the film, was given the role of Paul at the insistence of producer Wald, who hoped that an American in the cast would increase the film's box-office appeal in the United States.

The part of Clara Dawes was offered to Joan Collins, but she turned it down, as her then-fiancé Warren Beatty thought the script was "crap" and did not want her to do it. The part went finally to Mary Ure, who was nominated for Academy Award for Best Supporting Actress for her performance.

=== Filming ===
Location shooting took place near Nottingham in the East Midlands, very close to where Lawrence himself grew up. Interiors were filmed at Pinewood Studios in Buckinghamshire. Freddie Francis said he was hired to lens the film due to the recent success of Room at the Top (1959), for which he had served as cinematographer.

== Reception ==
=== Box office ===
By January 1961, the film had earned $1,500,000 from box office rentals in the United States and Canada and $800,000 in the United Kingdom. Kine Weekly called it a "money maker" at the British box office in 1960.

=== Critical reaction ===
Bosley Crowther of The New York Times wrote: "Sons and Lovers is sensitively felt and photographed in Jerry Wald's British-made film version of [Lawrence's novel] ... An excellent cast of British actors (and one American) play it well. And Jack Cardiff, camera man turned director, has filled it with picture poetry."

Variety described the film as "a well-made and conscientious adaptation of D. H. Lawrence's famed novel, smoothly directed by Jack Cardiff and superbly acted by a notable cast." The review particularly singled out Trevor Howard for "giving a moving and wholly believable study of a man equally capable of tenderness as he is of being tough."

Harrison's Reports wrote: "Prizeworthy performances are rendered by all, especially Trevor Howard as a humorous, drunken miner; Wendy Hiller as his wife; Dean Stockwell as the sensitive son; Heather Sears and Mary Ure as friends of Stockwell. Direction is outstanding; photography [is] fine."

=== Accolades ===
Award	Category	Nominee(s)	Result	Ref.
Academy Awards	Best Motion Picture	Jerry Wald	Nominated	
Academy Awards	Best Director	Jack Cardiff	Nominated	
Academy Awards	Best Actor	Trevor Howard	Nominated	
Academy Awards	Best Supporting Actress	Mary Ure	Nominated	
Academy Awards	Best Screenplay – Based on Material from Another Medium	Gavin Lambert, T. E. B. Clarke	Nominated	
Academy Awards	Best Art Direction – Black-and-White	Art Direction: Thomas N. Morahan; Set Decoration: Lionel Couch	Nominated	
Academy Awards	Best Cinematography – Black-and-White	Freddie Francis	Won	
British Academy Film Awards	Best British Actress	Wendy Hiller	Nominated	
British Society of Cinematographers Awards	Best Cinematography in a Theatrical Feature Film	Freddie Francis	Won	
Cannes Film Festival	Palme d'Or	Jack Cardiff	Nominated	
Directors Guild of America Awards	Outstanding Directorial Achievement in Motion Pictures	Jack Cardiff	Nominated	
Golden Globe Awards	Best Motion Picture – Drama	style="background: #FFE3E3; color: black; vertical-align: middle; text-align: center; " class="no table-no2 notheme"|Nominated		
Golden Globe Awards	Best Director – Motion Picture	Jack Cardiff		Won
Golden Globe Awards	Best Actor in a Motion Picture – Drama	Trevor Howard		Nominated
Golden Globe Awards	Best Actor in a Motion Picture – Drama	Dean Stockwell		Nominated
Golden Globe Awards	Best Supporting Actress – Motion Picture	Mary Ure		Nominated
National Board of Review Awards	Top 10 Films	Sons and Lovers| style="background: #9EFF9E; color: #000; vertical-align: middle; text-align: center; " class="yes table-yes2 notheme"|Won		
National Board of Review Awards	Best Film	Sons and Lovers| style="background: #9EFF9E; color: #000; vertical-align: middle; text-align: center; " class="yes table-yes2 notheme"|Won		Won
National Board of Review Awards	Best Director	Jack Cardiff		Won
New York Film Critics Circle Awards	Best Film	style="background: #9EFF9E; color: #000; vertical-align: middle; text-align: center; " class="yes table-yes2 notheme"|Won (Note: Tied with The Apartment)		
New York Film Critics Circle Awards	Best Director	Jack Cardiff		Won (Note: Tied with Billy Wilder for The Apartment)
New York Film Critics Circle Awards	Best Actor	Trevor Howard		Nominated
New York Film Critics Circle Awards	Best Screenplay	Gavin Lambert, T. E. B. Clarke		Nominated
Writers Guild of America Awards	Best Written American Drama	Gavin Lambert, T. E. B. Clarke	Nominated	
