= 7th Directors Guild of America Awards =

- Date: 1955
- Country: United States
- Presented by: Directors Guild of America

Highlights
- Best Director Feature Film: On the Waterfront – Elia Kazan
- Best Director Television: Four Star Playhouse for "The Answer" – Roy Kellino
- Website: https://www.dga.org/Awards/History/1950s/1954.aspx?value=1954

The 7th Directors Guild of America Awards, honoring the outstanding directorial achievements in film and television in 1954, were presented in 1955.

== Winners and nominees ==
=== Film ===
Feature Film

Elia Kazan – On the Waterfront

- George Cukor – A Star Is Born
- Edward Dmytryk – The Caine Mutiny
- Stanley Donen – Seven Brides for Seven Brothers
- Melvin Frank and Norman Panama – Knock on Wood
- Samuel Fuller – Hell and High Water
- Alfred Hitchcock – Rear Window
- Henry King – King of the Khyber Rifles
- Anthony Mann – The Glenn Miller Story
- Jean Negulesco – Three Coins in the Fountain
- George Seaton – The Country Girl
- Don Siegel – Riot in Cell Block 11
- William A. Wellman – The High and the Mighty
- Robert Wise – Executive Suite
- Billy Wilder – Sabrina

=== Television ===
Television

Roy Kellino – Four Star Playhouse for "The Answer"

- William Asher – I Love Lucy for "Lucy's Mother-In-Law"
- Robert Florey – The Loretta Young Show for "The Clara Schumann Story"
- Ted Post – Waterfront for "High Water"
- Jack Webb – Dragnet for "The Big Producer"

=== Honorary Life Member ===
- Walt Disney
