= 1960 New York Film Critics Circle Awards =

26th New York Film Critics Circle Awards

26th New York Film Critics Circle Awards

January 21, 1961
(announced December 29, 1960)

The Apartment
and
Sons and Lovers

The 26th New York Film Critics Circle Awards, honored the best filmmaking of 1960.

== Winners ==
- Best Film (tie):
  - The Apartment
  - Sons and Lovers
- Best Actor:
  - Burt Lancaster - Elmer Gantry
- Best Actress:
  - Deborah Kerr - The Sundowners
- Best Director (tie):
  - Jack Cardiff - Sons and Lovers
  - Billy Wilder - The Apartment
- Best Screenplay:
  - Billy Wilder and I. A. L. Diamond - The Apartment
- Best Foreign Language Film:
  - Hiroshima Mon Amour • France/Japan
