= Elmer Gantry (film) =

1960 US drama film by Richard Brooks

- theatrical poster
- Directed by: Richard Brooks
- Screenplay by: Richard Brooks
- Based on: Elmer Gantry by Sinclair Lewis
- Produced by: Bernard Smith
- Starring: Burt Lancaster; Jean Simmons; Dean Jagger; Arthur Kennedy; Shirley Jones; Patti Page
- Cinematography: John Alton
- Edited by: Marjorie Fowler
- Music by: André Previn
- Production company: Elmer Gantry Productions
- Distributed by: United Artists
- Release date: June 29, 1960 (Los Angeles)
- Running time: 146 minutes
- Country: United States
- Language: English
- Budget: $3 million
- Box office: $5.2 million (rentals)

Elmer Gantry is a 1960 American psychological drama film directed by Richard Brooks and starring Burt Lancaster, Jean Simmons, Arthur Kennedy, Shirley Jones, and Patti Page. An adaptation of the 1927 novel of the same name by Sinclair Lewis, it focuses on a charismatic con man who, along with an itinerant evangelist sister, stages revival sermons throughout the Midwestern United States, taking advantage of unknowing locals.

Elmer Gantry was nominated for five Academy Awards in 1961, including Best Picture and Best Score. It won Best Actor for Lancaster, Best Supporting Actress for Jones and Best Adapted Screenplay. Jean Simmons was nominated for the Golden Globe Award for Best Actress in a Motion Picture – Drama category.

== Plot ==
Elmer Gantry is a hard-drinking, fast-talking traveling salesman with a charismatic personality who infuses biblical passages and fervor into his pitches as a way to ease and collect money. He is drawn to the roadshow of Sister Sharon Falconer and is immediately attracted to the revivalist's saintly aura. As the troupe leaves town for Kansas, Gantry sweet talks her naïve assistant Sister Rachel into disclosing information regarding Falconer's past, which he uses to con his way into her good graces. He joins the troupe preaching "Christ in commerce" and how he is a saved salesman.

Gantry and Falconer develop a "good cop/bad cop" routine, with Gantry telling the audience members that they will burn in Hell for their sins and Falconer promising salvation if they repent. Because of Gantry's fire and brimstone sermons, the group comes to the attention of the church council in Zenith, Winnemac, a larger city. Though Falconer's manager Bill Morgan does not think that she is ready to preach outside of the smaller venues, Gantry convinces her to go to Zenith. They meet with the church leaders, most of whom are wary of turning religion into a spectacle as Gantry does, but he convinces them that the churches must earn money to stay open and can increase their membership only if prospective members are first won over to Christ by attending Gantry's colorful revival meetings.

Traveling along with Falconer is big-city reporter Jim Lefferts, who is torn between his disgust for religious hucksterism and his admiration for Gantry's charm and cunning. As Gantry's sermons bring Falconer's group to larger venues, Lefferts writes a series of articles labeling the revival a sham, and reveals that neither Falconer nor Gantry has any credentials. Falconer eventually admits to Gantry that her real name is Katie Jones, and that her origins are humbler than she publicly admits. Falconer also becomes Gantry's lover and loses her virginity to him.

The success of the Falconer-Gantry team comes to the attention of Lulu Bains, who became a prostitute when her youthful affair with Gantry ruined her standing in her minister father's eyes and Gantry ditched her. Acting as a moralist, Gantry unwittingly invades the brothel where Lulu works, but sends the prostitutes out of town when he sees Lulu. When he meets Lulu privately after she phones him, Lulu wants revenge against Gantry for running out on her in Kansas. Her love for Gantry returns, however, when confronting him, and they embrace. A hidden photographer planted by Lulu records their embrace, but Gantry's love for Falconer prevents him from consummating his relationship with Lulu. Lulu proceeds to frame Gantry out of jealousy for his love for Falconer. Lulu blackmails him, and Falconer is asked to bring $25,000 in exchange for the negatives of the incriminating pictures. Falconer brings the money, but Lulu refuses to accept it, and the pictures are then printed on the front page of the town's newspaper.

Lulu had at first offered Lefferts the exclusive story of Gantry's supposed sexual indiscretion, but he refused, shrugging off the pictures as merely proof that Gantry is as human as anyone else. An angry mob ransacks the tent revival following the publication of the incriminating photos in another newspaper, with Lulu witnessing Gantry's humiliation. As the mob curses Gantry and smears him with eggs and produce, Lulu is emotionally shaken and flees the scene. She returns to the brothel, which is now in a dilapidated state from Gantry's publicity stunt. Her pimp is there to collect the $25,000, but when Lulu tells him that she did not take Falconer's money, he beats her. Gantry comes to Lulu's rescue. He disposes of the pimp and apologizes to Lulu, who later publicly confesses to having framed Gantry.

Gantry returns to Falconer as a capacity crowd of followers fills her new tabernacle following Gantry's redemption in the press. Falconer declines Gantry's request to abandon her soul-saving ventures, insisting that she and Gantry were brought together by God to do His work. After Falconer appears to cure a follower of deafness, a fire that had been smoldering erupts suddenly. Unable or unwilling to see past her own religious zeal as flames engulf her tabernacle, Falconer remains on the premises and dies. The next day, Gantry, saddened by Falconer's death, leads a spiritual with her followers after their prodding. Morgan asks Gantry to continue Falconer's ministry, but Gantry replies, quoting St. Paul: "When I was a child, I spake as a child, I understood as a child, I thought as a child: but when I became a man, I put away childish things". His valise in one hand, Falconer's charred Bible in the other, and a smile on his face, Gantry strides away.

== Cast ==
- Burt Lancaster as Elmer Gantry
- Jean Simmons as Sister Sharon Falconer
- Arthur Kennedy as Jim Lefferts
- Dean Jagger as William L. Morgan
- Shirley Jones as Lulu Bains
- Patti Page as Sister Rachel
- Edward Andrews as George F. Babbitt
- John McIntire as Rev. John Pengilly
- Hugh Marlowe as Rev. Philip Garrison
- Joe Maross as Pete
- Philip Ober as Rev. Planck
- Barry Kelley as Police Capt. Holt
- Wendell Holmes as Rev. Ulrich
- Dayton Lummis as Eddington
- Max Showalter as Deaf Man (uncredited)
- Harry Antrim as Salesman (uncredited)
- Barbara Luna as Prostitute (uncredited)
- Jean Willes as Prostitute (uncredited)
- John Qualen as Sam (uncredited)

== Production ==
=== Development ===
Richard Brooks wrote the screenplay for Elmer Gantry, adapting it from Sinclair Lewis's 1927 novel of the same name. After meeting Max Youngstein at United Artists and pitching a film adaptation in the spring of 1958, the studio agreed to back the project. Brooks completed his first draft in 1958 while aboard a cargo ship from Los Angeles to Stockholm, Sweden. Brooks brought with him a Gideon Bible, six volumes of H. L. Mencken's Prejudices, and hundreds of articles about religion and evangelism for research.

To appease the Production Code, several alterations were made to the screenplay, partly due to the code's observation that there were "no decent religious people" in the original script, a criticism Brooks acknowledged. The final draft of the screenplay was approved by the Production Code in August 1959.

The final screenplay overlaps with fewer than 100 pages of the novel, deleting many characters and fundamentally changing the character and actions of female evangelist Sister Sharon Falconer, as played by Simmons. The character of Sharon Falconer was loosely based on elements in the career of the Canadian-born American radio evangelist Aimee Semple McPherson, who founded the Pentecostal Christian denomination known as the International Church of the Foursquare Gospel in 1927. (Note: From the AFI Catalog for this film under the History tab: A 21 Nov 1958 memo in the PCA file specifies that [George] Shurlock considered the film’s first draft to be in violation of the Code. In response (and in accordance with Lancaster’s age), according to a modern interview with Brooks, the writer-director adapted the story to focus on Gantry’s middle years, changed Falconer into a sincerely religious figure, converted Jim Lefferts from a seminary student to an atheist reporter, and most importantly, portrayed Gantry as not an ordained minister. This change sidestepped Code restrictions disallowing ministers to be portrayed in a negative light. In a 24 Nov 1958 memo, Brooks noted that he retained the story’s 1920s setting to avoid any identification with contemporary religious leaders.) In addition, a plot point from the end of the novel is incorporated into Gantry and Lulu Bains's relationship, fundamentally changing the fates of both characters.

=== Casting ===
Brooks originally envisioned Montgomery Clift in the title role of Elmer Gantry, and also considered James Cagney for the role. Burt Lancaster was ultimately cast in the lead role as Gantry, though he initially was hesitant to take the part as he disliked the original screenplay, feeling it was too long and too detailed. After Lancaster declined, Brooks offered to rework the screenplay with him, and spent several months redrafting it together. In addition to his acting, Lancaster took on an executive-producing role, forming Elmer Gantry Productions with Brooks and enlisting Bernard Smith to produce the film.

Though both Elizabeth Taylor, Vivien Leigh and Susan Hayward were considered for the part of Sister Sharon Falconer, Jean Simmons was cast in the role. Simmons was an acquaintance of Brooks, as her husband, Stewart Granger, had previously worked with him on the films The Light Touch and The Last Hunt. Shirley Jones, who at the time was mainly known for her work in musicals and comedy films, was cast as Lulu Baines at the suggestion of Lancaster, though Brooks was hesitant to hire her. According to Jones, Brooks had originally wanted Piper Laurie for the part. Singer Patti Page made her feature film debut portraying Sister Rachel, a singer in Sister Sharon's choir.

=== Filming ===
Principal photography of Elmer Gantry took place in Santa Monica, California, as well as at the Burbank–Columbia Ranch in Burbank. Jones recalled that Brooks initially gave her "no direction whatsoever" during her first day on set, but apologized to her the following day, saying: "Not only are you going to be great in this film, but I predict you're going to win an Academy Award." Despite indicating that Brooks warmed to her after that point, Jones claimed that his direction of the extras in the film was notably harsh: "He'd just go over and push somebody aside and say, 'Sit down and keep your mouth shut.' He was mean, really mean." Simmons similarly recalled that, on the set, "this quiet, soft-spoken gentleman that I thought I knew a little bit became a raging lunatic," though she spoke fondly of his sense of humor.

== Soundtrack ==
Elmer Gantry

Soundtrack album by André Previn
- Released: August 25, 1998
- Label: Rykodisc

A remastered and enhanced soundtrack was released on CD on August 25, 1998.

All arrangements are by André Previn.

1. "Main Title" (1:45)
2. "Long Distance" (1:38)
3. "Mr. Babbitt" (3:15)
4. "Lulu's Room" (2:49)
5. "Do You Believe" (1:55)
6. "Not as My Lover" (1:10)
7. "Under the Pier" (3:14)
8. "Shall We Gather at the River" (1:43)
9. "Kiss Me Goodbye" (4:06)
10. "Stand Up for Jesus" (1:16)
11. "Elmer and Lulu" (1:25)
12. "End Title" (1:35)
13. "Orchestral Suite" (2:56)
14. "Onward Christian Soldiers" (instrumental, 1:25)
15. "Shall We Gather at the River" (1:43)
16. "Stand Up for Jesus" (1:15)
17. "I'm on My Way" (Burt Lancaster – vocal) (2:47)

== Release ==
Elmer Gantry had its world premiere in Los Angeles at the Hollywood Paramount Theater on June 29, 1960, followed by a New York City release on July 7, 1960.

The film opens with a disclaimer written by director Richard Brooks, in which he describes the controversial nature of the story and urges that the film is intended for adult audiences:

We believe that certain aspects of Revivalism can bear examination—that the conduct of some revivalists makes a mockery of the traditional beliefs and practices of organized Christianity! We believe that everyone has a right to worship according to his conscience, butFreedom of Religion is not license to abuse the faith of the people! However, due to the highly controversial nature of this film, we strongly urge you to prevent impressionable children from seeing it!

=== Home media ===
CBS/Fox Video released Elmer Gantry on VHS in 1983, followed by a reprint in 1987. CBS/Fox also issued the film in LaserDisc format in 1985. MGM/UA Home Entertainment re-released a VHS edition in 1990, which was reprinted in 1998.

In 2001, MGM Home Entertainment released the film for the first time on DVD. Kino Lorber reissued the film on DVD and Blu-ray on September 23, 2014.

== Reception ==
In a contemporary review for The New York Times, critic A. H. Weiler was overwhelmingly positive in his assessment, calling the film "... a living, action-packed, provoking screen study, largely devoid of the novel's polemics, that captures both the eye and mind" and writing: "It is a complex story, running nearly two and a half hours, but its length is hardly noticeable since its many vignettes, each sharply presented, are joined into a theme that somewhat changes Gantry, Sister Falconer, et al. from Lewis' conception but has them shape up as forceful, and often memorable, individuals." Philip K. Scheuer of the Los Angeles Times called the film an "erratically brilliant shocker" and praised the performances and period detail. Wanda Hale of the New York Daily News awarded the film a four out of four star-rating, praising it as one of the best films of the year.

On the review aggregator website Rotten Tomatoes, 94% of 34 critics' reviews of the film are positive.

== Accolades ==
Award/association	Year	Category	Recipient(s) and nominee(s)	Result	Ref.
Academy Awards	1961	Best Motion Picture	Bernard Smith	Nominated	
Academy Awards	1961	Best Actor	Burt Lancaster	Won	
Academy Awards	1961	Best Supporting Actress	Shirley Jones	Won	
Academy Awards	1961	Best Screenplay – Based on Material from Another Medium	Richard Brooks	Won	
Academy Awards	1961	Best Music Score of a Dramatic or Comedy Picture	André Previn	Nominated	
British Academy Film Awards	1961	Best Film		Nominated	
British Academy Film Awards	1961	Best Foreign Actor	Burt Lancaster	Nominated	
British Academy Film Awards	1961	Best Foreign Actress	Jean Simmons	Nominated	
Cahiers du cinéma	1961	Top 10 Film Award		9th Place	
Directors Guild of America	1961	Outstanding Directorial Achievement in Motion Pictures	Richard Brooks	Nominated	
Golden Globe Awards	1961	Best Motion Picture – Drama		Nominated	
Golden Globe Awards	1961	Best Actor in a Motion Picture – Drama	Burt Lancaster	Won	
Golden Globe Awards	1961	Best Actress in a Motion Picture – Drama	Jean Simmons	Nominated	
Golden Globe Awards	1961	Best Supporting Actress – Motion Picture	Shirley Jones	Nominated	
Golden Globe Awards	1961	Best Director – Motion Picture	Richard Brooks	Nominated	
Laurel Awards	1961	Top Drama		Won	
Laurel Awards	1961	Top Male Dramatic Performance	Burt Lancaster	Won	
Laurel Awards	1961	Top Female Dramatic Performance	Jean Simmons	Nominated	
Laurel Awards	1961	Top Female Supporting Performance	Shirley Jones	Won	
National Board of Review	1961	Top 10 Films		6th Place	
National Board of Review	1961	Best Supporting Actress	Shirley Jones	Won	
New York Film Critics Circle Awards	1961	Best Film		Nominated	
New York Film Critics Circle Awards	1961	Best Actor	Burt Lancaster	Won	
Writers Guild of America	1961	Best Written American Drama	Richard Brooks	Won	

== See also ==
- List of American films of 1960

== Sources ==
- Daniel, Douglass K. (2011). Tough as Nails: The Life and Films of Richard Brooks. Madison, Wisconsin: University of Wisconsin Press. ISBN 978-0-299-25123-9.

=== Further reading ===
- Wheeler Winston Dixon. "Cinematic Adaptations of the Works of Sinclair Lewis." Sinclair Lewis at 100: Papers Presented at a Centennial Conference. Ed. Michael Connaughton. St. Cloud: St. Cloud State University, 1985. 191–200.
