= National Board of Review Awards 1960 =

Annual US film awards ceremony

32nd National Board of Review Awards

December 22, 1960

The 32nd National Board of Review Awards were announced on December 22, 1960.

== Top Ten Films ==
1. Sons and Lovers
2. The Alamo
3. The Sundowners
4. Inherit the Wind
5. Sunrise at Campobello
6. Elmer Gantry
7. Home from the Hill
8. The Apartment
9. Wild River
10. The Dark at the Top of the Stairs

== Top foreign Films ==
1. The World of Apu
2. General della Rovere
3. The Angry Silence
4. I'm All Right Jack
5. Hiroshima Mon Amour

== Winners ==
- Best Film: Sons and Lovers
- Best Foreign Film: The World of Apu
- Best Actor: Robert Mitchum (The Sundowners, Home from the Hill)
- Best Actress: Greer Garson (Sunrise at Campobello)
- Best Supporting Actor: George Peppard (Home from the Hill)
- Best Supporting Actress: Shirley Jones (Elmer Gantry)
- Best Director: Jack Cardiff (Sons and Lovers)
