= 13th Directors Guild of America Awards =

- Date: 1961
- Country: United States
- Presented by: Directors Guild of America

Highlights
- Best Director Feature Film: The Apartment – Billy Wilder
- Best Director Television: Hallmark Hall of Fame for "Macbeth" – George Schaefer
- Website: https://www.dga.org/Awards/History/1960s/1960.aspx?value=1960

The 13th Directors Guild of America Awards, honoring the outstanding directorial achievements in film and television in 1960, were presented in 1961.

== Winners and nominees ==
=== Film ===
Feature Film

Billy Wilder – The Apartment

- Richard Brooks – Elmer Gantry
- Jack Cardiff – Sons and Lovers
- Vincent J. Donehue – Sunrise at Campobello
- Lewis Gilbert – Sink the Bismarck!
- Alfred Hitchcock – Psycho
- Walter Lang – Can-Can
- Delbert Mann – The Dark at the Top of the Stairs
- Vincente Minnelli – Bells Are Ringing
- Carol Reed – Our Man in Havana
- Alain Resnais – Hiroshima mon amour
- Charles Walters – Please Don't Eat the Daisies
- Fred Zinnemann – The Sundowners

=== Television ===
Television

George Schaefer – Hallmark Hall of Fame for "Macbeth"

- Vincent J. Donehue – Peter Pan
- Norman Jewison – Belafonte, New York 19
- Howard W. Koch – The Untouchables for "The Unhired Assassin"
- Franklin J. Schaffner – Playhouse 90 for "The Cruel Day"

=== D.W. Griffith Award ===
- Frank Borzage

=== Honorary Life Member ===
- Y. Frank Freeman
