= 14th British Academy Film Awards =

1961 film awards ceremony

- Date: 1961

Highlights
- Best Film: The Apartment
- Best British Film: Saturday Night and Sunday Morning
- Most awards: The Apartment & Saturday Night and Sunday Morning (3)
- Most nominations: Saturday Night and Sunday Morning (6)

The 14th British Academy Film Awards, given by the British Academy of Film and Television Arts in 1961, honoured the best films of 1960.

== Winners and nominees ==
=== Best Film ===
The Apartment

- The Angry Silence
- Inherit the Wind
- Let's Make Love
- Elmer Gantry
- Shadows
- Saturday Night and Sunday Morning
- Spartacus
- Tunes of Glory
- The Trials of Oscar Wilde
- La Dolce Vita
- Hiroshima mon amour
- Orfeu Negro
- Pote tin Kyriaki
- Le testament d'Orphée
- Les Quatre cents coups
- L'Avventura

=== Best British Film ===
Saturday Night and Sunday Morning

- The Angry Silence
- The Trials of Oscar Wilde
- Tunes of Glory

=== Best Foreign Actor ===
Jack Lemmon in The Apartment

- George Hamilton in Crime & Punishment, USA
- Burt Lancaster in Elmer Gantry
- Fredric March in Inherit the Wind
- Spencer Tracy in Inherit the Wind
- Yves Montand in Let's Make Love

=== Best British Actor ===
Peter Finch in The Trials of Oscar Wilde

- Richard Attenborough in The Angry Silence
- Laurence Olivier in The Entertainer
- Albert Finney in Saturday Night and Sunday Morning
- John Fraser in The Trials of Oscar Wilde
- Alec Guinness in Tunes of Glory
- John Mills in Tunes of Glory

=== Best British Actress ===
Rachel Roberts in Saturday Night and Sunday Morning

- Hayley Mills in Pollyanna
- Wendy Hiller in Sons and Lovers

=== Best Foreign Actress ===
Shirley MacLaine in The Apartment

- Pier Angeli in The Angry Silence
- Monica Vitti in L'Avventura
- Jean Simmons in Elmer Gantry
- Emmanuelle Riva in Hiroshima mon amour
- Melina Mercouri in Pote tin Kyriaki

=== Best British Screenplay ===
The Angry Silence - Bryan Forbes
