= Irving G. Thalberg Memorial Award =

Award of the Academy of Motion Picture Arts and Sciences

- Awarded for: creative producers, whose bodies of work reflect a consistently high quality of motion picture production.
- Country: United States
- Presented by: Academy of Motion Picture Arts and Sciences (AMPAS)
- First award: 1938
- Website: oscars.org

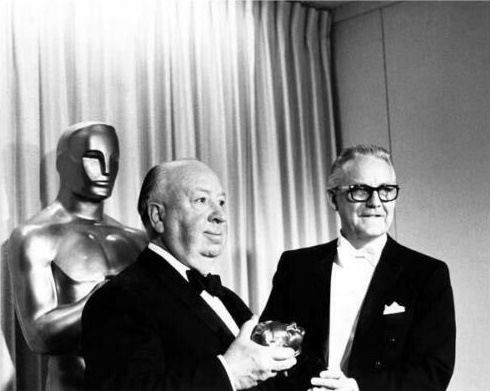
Alfred Hitchcock receiving the Irving G. Thalberg Memorial Award from Robert Wise (40th Academy Awards, 1967)

The Irving G. Thalberg Memorial Award is awarded periodically by the Academy of Motion Picture Arts and Sciences to "creative producers, whose bodies of work reflect a consistently high quality of motion picture production". The award is named for Irving Thalberg, head of the Production Division of Metro-Goldwyn-Mayer, who developed the company's reputation for sophisticated films. The trophy itself was originally a bust of Thalberg rather than the familiar Oscar statuette. However, it is still counted as an "Honorary Oscar". The bust of Thalberg was last used in 2018 when the award was presented to Kathleen Kennedy and Frank Marshall. When the award was next presented at the 15th Governors Awards to Barbara Broccoli and Michael G. Wilson in 2024, the Oscar statuette was used instead.

The award was established in 1937 and was first presented at the 10th Academy Awards, in March 1938. Since 2009, it has been presented at the separate Governors Awards rather than at the main Academy Awards ceremony.

The Award has been awarded 39 times to date. Katharine Hepburn made her only appearance at an Oscar ceremony to present the award to her long-time friend Lawrence Weingarten at the 46th Academy Awards ceremony in 1974.

== List of recipients ==
Year Awarded	Honorees	
1937		Darryl F. Zanuck (1)
1938		Hal B. Wallis
1939	David O. Selznick in 1934	David O. Selznick
1941	Walt Disney in 1946	Walt Disney
1942	Sidney Franklin in 1920	Sidney Franklin
1943		Hal B. Wallis
1944		Darryl F. Zanuck (2)
1946	Samuel Goldwyn in 1919	Samuel Goldwyn
1948	Jerry Wald in 1947	Jerry Wald
1950		Darryl F. Zanuck (3)
1951	Arthur Freed in 1964	Arthur Freed
1952	Cecil B. DeMille circa 1920	Cecil B. DeMille
1953	George Stevens in 1957	George Stevens
1956	Buddy Adler in 1958	Buddy Adler
1958	Jack Warner in 1955	Jack L. Warner
1961	Stanley Kramer circa 1955	Stanley Kramer
1963	Sam Spiegel in 1963	Sam Spiegel
1965	William Wyler circa 1945	William Wyler
1966	Robert Wise in 1990	Robert Wise
1967	Alfred Hitchcock by Jack Mitchell, circa 1972	Alfred Hitchcock
1970	Ingmar Bergman in 1957	Ingmar Bergman
1973	–	Lawrence Weingarten
1975	Mervyn LeRoy in 1958	Mervyn LeRoy
1976	Pandro S. Berman in 1953	Pandro S. Berman
1977	–	Walter Mirisch
1979	Stark (left) and Nancy Kwan in 1960	Ray Stark
1981	Albert R. Broccoli in 1976	Albert R. Broccoli
1986	Steven Spielberg in 2017	Steven Spielberg
1987		Billy Wilder
1990	David Brown in 2000	David Brown
1990	Richard D. Zanuck in 1990	Richard D. Zanuck
1991	George Lucas in 2009	George Lucas
1994	Clint Eastwood in 2010	Clint Eastwood
1996		Saul Zaentz
1998	Norman Jewison in 2012	Norman Jewison
1999	Warren Beatty in 2001	Warren Beatty
2000	Dino De Laurentiis in 2009	Dino De Laurentiis
2009	–	John Calley
2010	Francis Ford Coppola in 2011	Francis Ford Coppola
2018	Kathleen Kennedy in 2015	Kathleen Kennedy
2018	Frank Marshall in 2012	Frank Marshall
2024	Broccoli in 2015	Barbara Broccoli
2024	Wilson (left) and Daniel Craig in 2006	Michael G. Wilson
2026	Vachon in 2019	Christine Vachon
2026	–	Pamela Koffler

== Other nominees ==
The 11th Academy Awards, where the award was won by Hal B. Wallis, marks the only occasion for which non-winning nominations were announced. The other nominees were: Samuel Goldwyn, Joe Pasternak, David O. Selznick, Hunt Stromberg, Walter Wanger, Darryl F. Zanuck.
