= 9th Directors Guild of America Awards =

- Date: 1957
- Country: United States
- Presented by: Directors Guild of America

Highlights
- Best Director Feature Film: Giant – George Stevens
- Best Director Television: General Electric Theater for "The Road That Led Afar" – Herschel Daugherty
- Website: https://www.dga.org/Awards/History/1950s/1956.aspx?value=1956

The 9th Directors Guild of America Awards, honoring the outstanding directorial achievements in film and television in 1956, were presented in 1957.

== Winners and nominees ==
=== Film ===
Feature Film

George Stevens – Giant

- Michael Anderson – Around the World in 80 Days
- John Ford – The Searchers
- Alfred Hitchcock – The Trouble with Harry
- John Huston – Moby Dick
- Nunnally Johnson – The Man in the Gray Flannel Suit
- Henry King – Carousel
- Walter Lang – The King and I
- Joshua Logan – Bus Stop
- Daniel Mann – Teahouse of the August Moon
- Carol Reed – Trapeze
- Robert Rossen – Alexander the Great
- Roy Rowland – Meet Me in Las Vegas
- George Sidney – The Eddy Duchin Story
- King Vidor – War and Peace
- Robert Wise – Somebody Up There Likes Me
- William Wyler – Friendly Persuasion

=== Television ===
Television

Herschel Daugherty – General Electric Theater for "The Road That Led Afar"

- George Archainbaud – Tales of the 77th Bengal Lancers for "The Traitor"
- Robert Florey – On Trial for The De Santre Affair
- Norman Foster – The Loretta Young Show for "The Cardinal's Secret"
- Lesley Selander – Lassie for "Friendship"
- Robert Stevens – Alfred Hitchcock Presents for "Never Again"

=== D.W. Griffith Award ===
- King Vidor

=== Honorary Life Member ===
- Donald Crisp
