= The Apartment =

1960 film by Billy Wilder

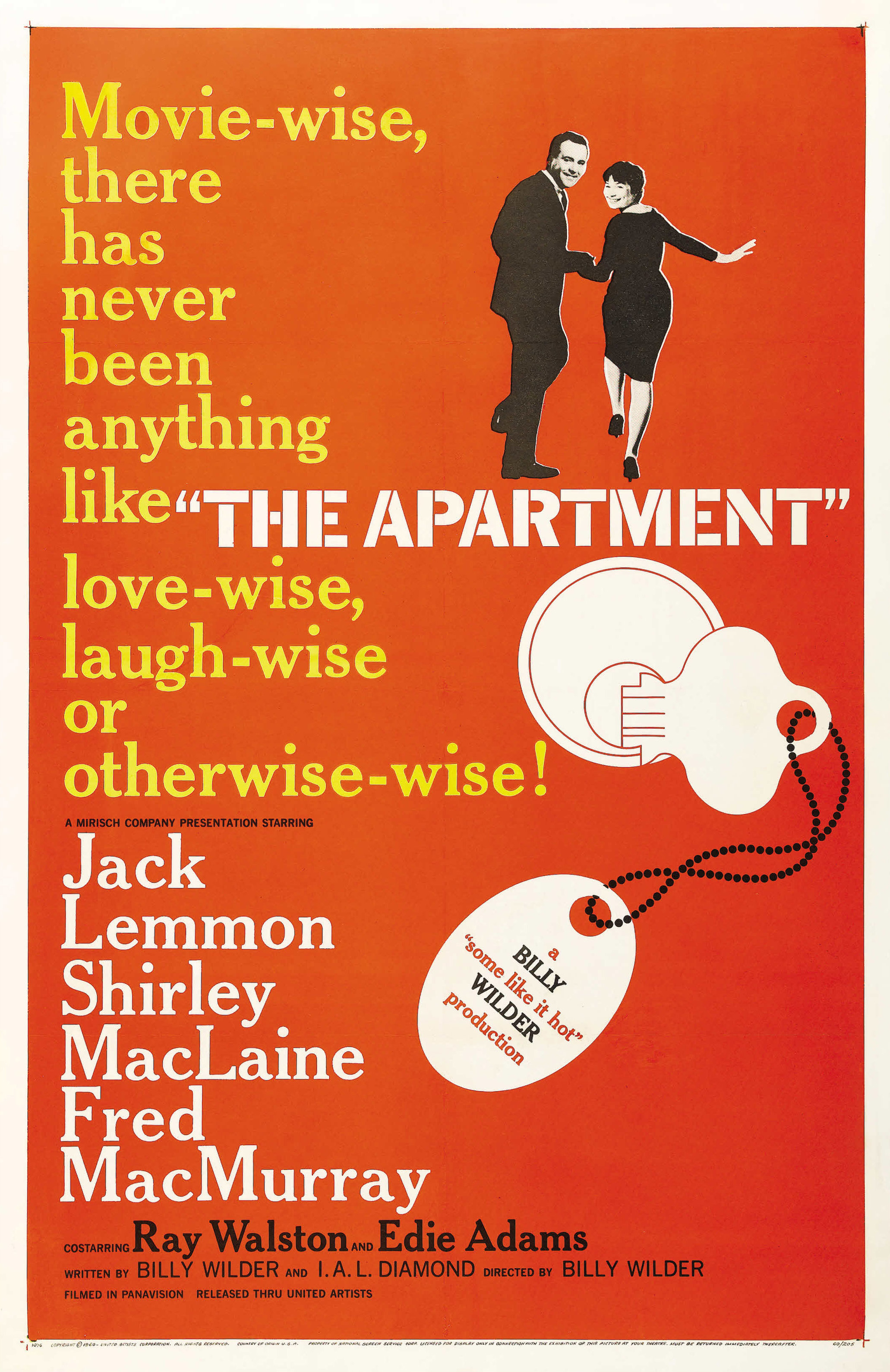
- Theatrical release poster
- Directed by: Billy Wilder
- Written by: Billy Wilder; I. A. L. Diamond
- Produced by: Billy Wilder
- Starring: Jack Lemmon; Shirley MacLaine; Fred MacMurray; Ray Walston; Edie Adams
- Cinematography: Joseph LaShelle
- Edited by: Daniel Mandell
- Music by: Adolph Deutsch
- Production company: The Mirisch Company
- Distributed by: United Artists
- Release date: June 15, 1960 (New York City)
- Running time: 125 minutes
- Country: United States
- Language: English
- Budget: $3 million
- Box office: $24.6 million

The Apartment is a 1960 American romantic comedy film directed and produced by Billy Wilder from a screenplay he co-wrote with I. A. L. Diamond. Jack Lemmon stars as an insurance clerk who, in hopes of climbing the corporate ladder, allows his superiors to use his Upper West Side apartment to conduct their extramarital affairs. He becomes attracted to an elevator operator (Shirley MacLaine) in his office building, unaware that she is having an affair with the head of personnel (Fred MacMurray). Ray Walston and Edie Adams feature in supporting roles.

The Apartment was distributed by United Artists to widespread critical acclaim and was a commercial success, despite controversy owing to its subject matter. It became the 8th highest-grossing film of 1960. At the 33rd Academy Awards, the film was nominated for ten awards and won five, including Best Picture, Best Director, and Best Screenplay. Lemmon, MacLaine, and Jack Kruschen were nominated for Best Actor, Best Actress, and Best Supporting Actor respectively, and Lemmon and MacLaine won Golden Globe Awards for their performances. Promises, Promises, a 1968 Broadway musical by Burt Bacharach, Hal David, and Neil Simon, was based on the film.

The Apartment has come to be regarded as one of the greatest films ever made, appearing in lists by the American Film Institute and Sight and Sound magazine. In 1994, it was one of 25 films selected for preservation in the Library of Congress's National Film Registry.

== Plot ==
C.C. "Buddy Boy" Baxter is a lonely office worker at Consolidated Insurance Company in New York City. To climb the corporate ladder, he allows four managers to take turns borrowing his Upper West Side apartment for extramarital affairs. Baxter meticulously juggles the "booking" schedule; the steady stream of women convinces his neighbors he is a playboy.

In a quid pro quo, the four managers submit glowing performance reviews of Baxter to personnel director Jeff Sheldrake, who grows suspicious of Baxter's popularity. Under Sheldrake's cynical questioning, Baxter confesses the arrangement with his apartment. Sheldrake implies that he will promote Baxter, if Sheldrake also gains use of the apartment for his own affair, starting that night. As compensation for short notice, he gives Baxter two tickets to see The Music Man. Baxter asks Fran Kubelik, an elevator operator coworker to whom he is attracted, to join him. She agrees to meet Baxter after dinner with a "former fling", who turns out to be Sheldrake. When Sheldrake tells her that he plans to divorce his wife to be with her, they head to Baxter's apartment, while Baxter is stood up at the theater.

During the company's raucous Christmas Eve party, Sheldrake's secretary, Miss Olsen, tells Fran that her boss has had numerous affairs with female employees, including herself. Fran confronts Sheldrake at Baxter's apartment; he claims he loves her, gives her $100 as a Christmas present, which makes her feel "paid", and heads back to his family in White Plains.

Realizing Fran is the woman Sheldrake has been taking to his apartment, Baxter lets himself be picked up by a married woman at a local bar. When they arrive at his apartment, Fran is passed out on his bed from an overdose of sleeping pills. He sends away the woman from the bar and enlists his neighbor, Dr. Dreyfuss, to revive Fran. To deflect questions and protect Sheldrake, Baxter implies he was responsible for the incident; Dreyfuss scolds him for philandering and advises him to "be a mensch."

Fran spends two days recuperating in Baxter's apartment. A bond develops between them, especially after he confesses to a comically botched suicide attempt over unrequited love where he shot himself in the knee. Fran confides she has always suffered bad luck in her love life.

As Baxter prepares a romantic dinner, one of the managers arrives for a tryst. Baxter persuades him and his companion to leave, but the manager recognizes Fran and later informs his colleagues. They are annoyed they have lost ready access to the apartment since Baxter's promotion. When Fran's brother-in-law Karl comes to the office looking for her, the managers send him to Baxter's apartment. Baxter deflects Karl's anger over Fran's wayward behavior by once again assuming all responsibility; Karl punches him. As she leaves, Fran chides Baxter for taking the blame but kisses him for protecting her.

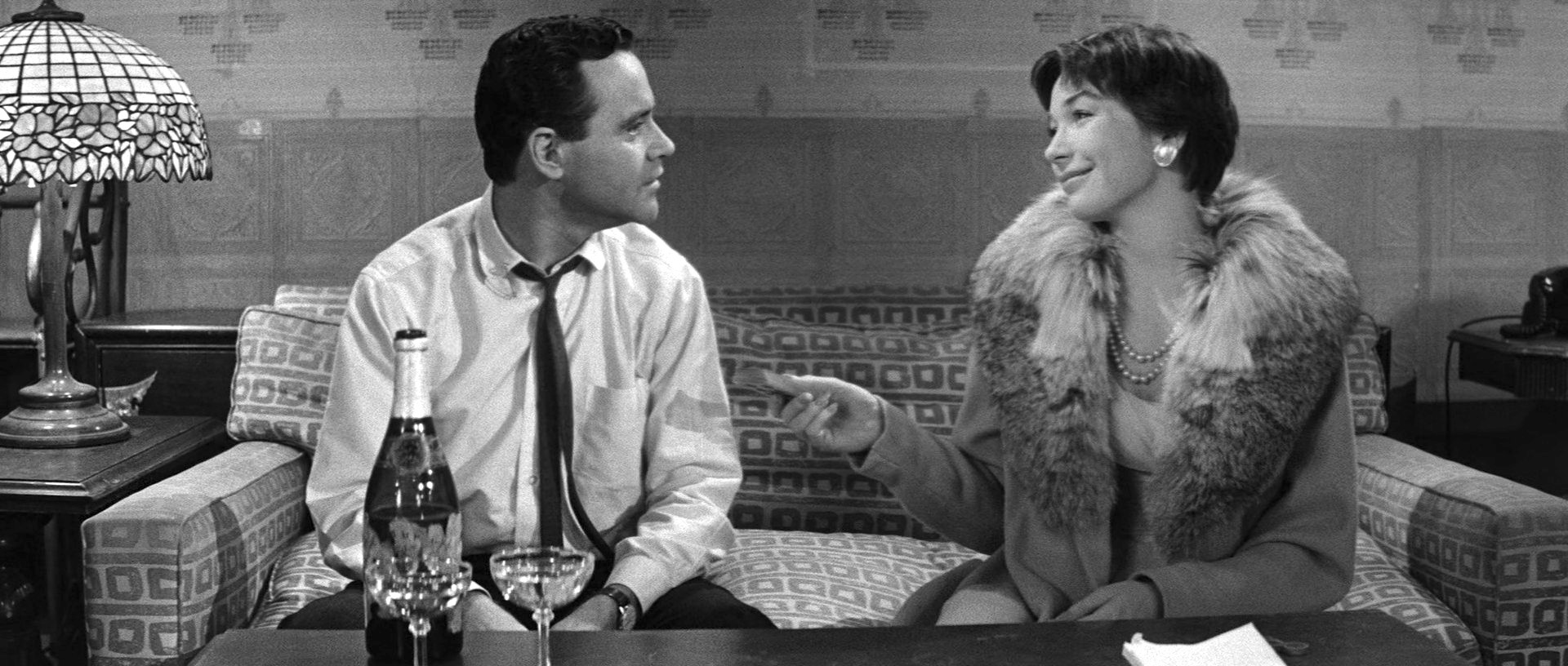
CC "Buddy Boy" Baxter (Jack Lemmon) and Fran Kubelik (Shirley MacLaine), in a still from the film's final scene: "Shut up and deal."

When Sheldrake learns Miss Olsen told Fran about his affairs, he fires her; she retaliates by spilling all to Sheldrake's wife, who promptly throws him out. After complaining to Baxter that women expect affairs to lead to marriage, Sheldrake gives Fran insincere assurances; she now hints she is losing interest. Having promoted Baxter to an even higher position, Sheldrake expects Baxter to resume lending the key to his apartment so he can take Fran there. Instead, Baxter gives back the key to the building's "executive washroom", proclaiming that he has decided to become a mensch, and quits the firm. He decides to move out of the apartment and begins to pack his belongings.

That night at a New Year's Eve party, Sheldrake indignantly tells Fran about Baxter's quitting, disclosing that Baxter refused to let him use his apartment, particularly with Fran. She abandons Sheldrake and runs to the apartment. At the door, Fran hears an apparent gunshot, but Baxter opens the door holding a bottle of just-opened champagne. Baxter declares his love for Fran. As she prepares to resume a game of gin rummy left unfinished earlier, she smiles, hands him the cards and says, "Shut up and deal".

== Cast ==
- Jack Lemmon as Calvin Clifford (CC) "Buddy Boy" Baxter, an office worker
- Shirley MacLaine as Fran Kubelik, an elevator operator
- Fred MacMurray as Jeff D. Sheldrake, personnel manager, Baxter's boss and apartment user
- Ray Walston as Joe Dobisch, public relations manager and Baxter's apartment user
- Jack Kruschen as Dr. David Dreyfuss, Baxter's neighbor
- David Lewis as Al Kirkeby, claims department manager and Baxter's apartment user
- Hope Holiday as Mrs. Margie MacDougall, a woman whom Baxter meets at the bar
- Joan Shawlee as Sylvia, Al's partner
- Naomi Stevens as Mrs. Mildred Dreyfuss, David's wife
- Johnny Seven as Karl Matuschka, Fran's cab driving brother-in-law
- Joyce Jameson as the blonde in the bar
- Willard Waterman as Mr. Vanderhoff, manager and Baxter's apartment user
- David White as Mr. Eichelberger, manager and Baxter's apartment user
- Edie Adams as Miss Olsen, Sheldrake's secretary
- Hal Smith as Santa Claus in the bar (uncredited)

== Production ==
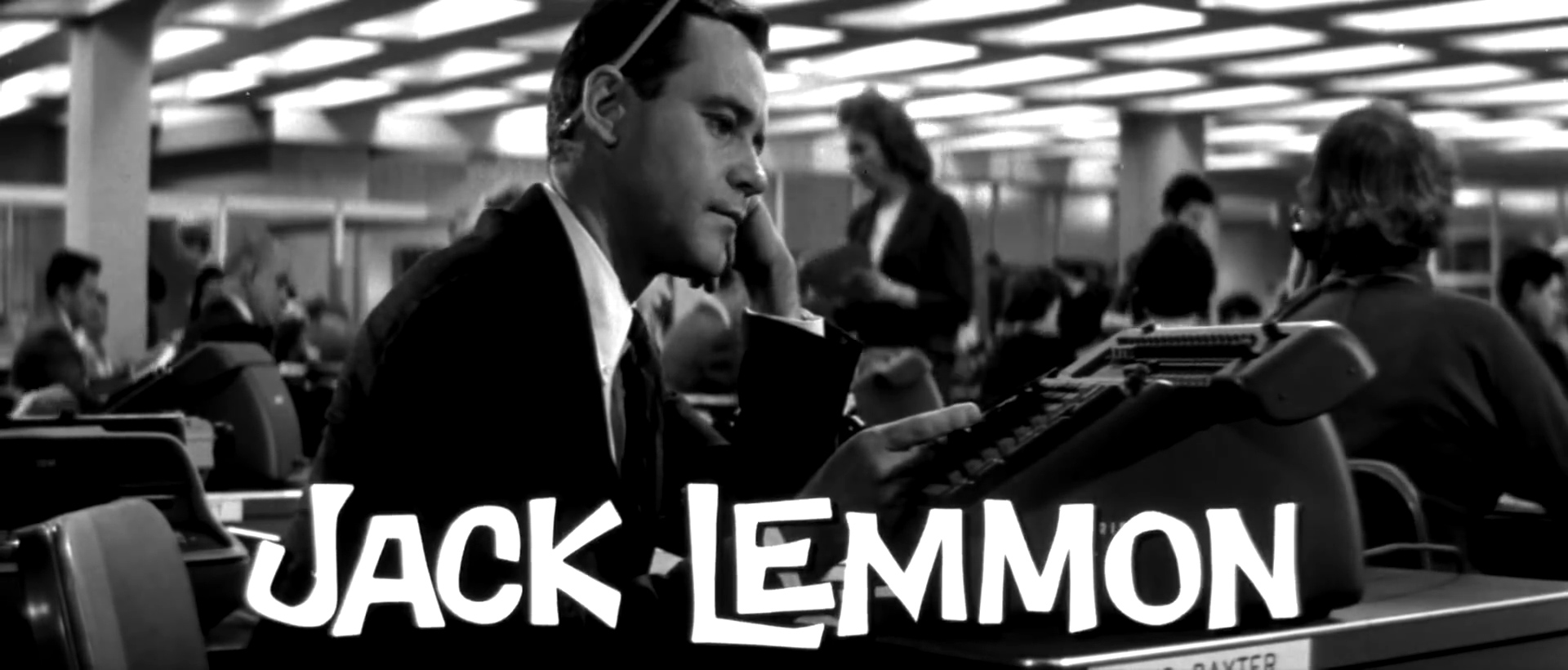
Jack Lemmon in a still from the film's trailer. The Apartment marked his second collaboration with Billy Wilder after Some Like It Hot.

Immediately following the success of 1959's Some Like It Hot, Wilder and Diamond wished to make another film with Jack Lemmon. Wilder had originally planned to cast Paul Douglas as Sheldrake; however, after he died unexpectedly, Fred MacMurray took his place.

The initial concept was inspired by Brief Encounter by Noël Coward, in which Laura Jesson (Celia Johnson) meets Alec Harvey (Trevor Howard) for a tryst in his friend's apartment, which ends up thwarted. However, Wilder was unable to make the comedy about adultery he envisioned in the 1940s due to Hays Code restrictions. Wilder and Diamond also based the film partially on a Hollywood scandal in which agent Jennings Lang was shot by producer Walter Wanger for having an affair with Wanger's wife, actress Joan Bennett; during the affair, Lang had used a low-level employee's apartment for trysts. Another element of the plot was based on the experience of one of Diamond's friends, who returned home after breaking up with his girlfriend to find that she had committed suicide in his bed.

Although Wilder generally required his actors to adhere exactly to the script, he allowed Lemmon to improvise in two scenes. In one, he squirts a bottle of nasal spray across the room, and in the other he sings while cooking spaghetti (which he strains through the strings of a tennis racket). In another scene, where Lemmon was supposed to mime being punched, he failed to move correctly and was accidentally knocked down. Wilder chose to use the shot in the film. Lemmon also caught a cold (he was supposed to come down with in the script) when one scene on a park bench was filmed on a bitter autumn night.

The film's introductory scene was inspired by this sequence from King Vidor's 1928 film The Crowd.

Art director Alexandre Trauner used forced perspective to create the set of a large insurance company office. The set appeared to be a very long room full of desks and workers; however, successively smaller people and desks were used, ending up with children. He designed the set of Baxter's apartment to appear smaller and shabbier than the spacious apartments that usually appeared in films of the day. He used items from thrift stores and even some of Wilder's own furniture for the set.

=== Music ===
The film's title theme, written by Charles Williams and originally titled "Jealous Lover", was first heard in the 1949 film The Romantic Age. A recording by Ferrante & Teicher, released as "Theme from The Apartment", reached #10 on the Billboard Hot 100 chart later in 1960.

== Reception ==
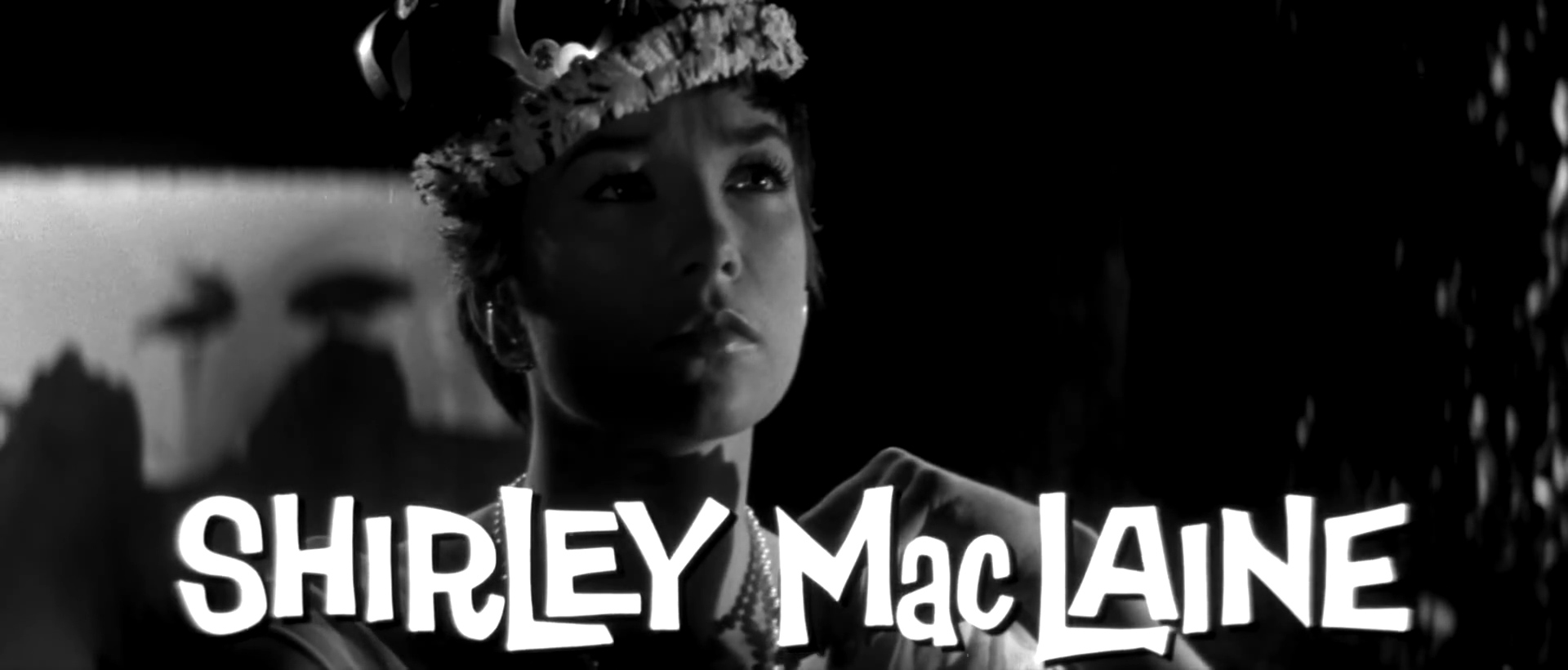
Shirley MacLaine in the trailer for the film.

The film made double its $3 million budget at the US and Canadian box office in 1960. Critics were split on The Apartment. Time and Newsweek praised it, as did The New York Times film critic Bosley Crowther, who called the film "gleeful, tender, and even sentimental" and Wilder's direction "ingenious". Esquire critic Dwight Macdonald gave the film a poor review, calling it "a paradigm of corny avantgardism". Others took issue with the film's controversial depictions of infidelity and adultery, with critic Hollis Alpert of the Saturday Review dismissing it as "a dirty fairy tale".

MacMurray, having generally played guileless characters, related that after the film's release he was accosted by women in the street who berated him for making a "dirty filthy movie", and one of them hit him with her purse.

In 2001, Chicago Sun-Times film critic Roger Ebert gave the film four stars out of four, and added it to his Great Movies list. The film critic Clarisse Loughrey has identified it as one of her two favorite movies, along with the 2010 film Boy. The film holds a 93% rating on Rotten Tomatoes, based on 103 reviews with an average rating of 8.8/10; the site's consensus states that "Director Billy Wilder's customary cynicism is leavened here by tender humor, romance, and genuine pathos". On Metacritic, the film has a score of 94 out of 100 based on 21 reviews, and was awarded the "Must-See" badge.

== Awards and nominations ==
Year	Award	Category	Nominee(s)	Result
1961	Academy Awards	Best Motion Picture	Billy Wilder	Won
1961	Academy Awards	Best Director	Billy Wilder	Won
1961	Academy Awards	Best Actor	Jack Lemmon	Nominated
1961	Academy Awards	Best Actress	Shirley MacLaine	Nominated
1961	Academy Awards	Best Supporting Actor	Jack Kruschen	Nominated
1961	Academy Awards	Best Story and Screenplay – Written Directly for the Screen	Billy Wilder and I. A. L. Diamond	Won
1961	Academy Awards	Best Art Direction – Black-and-White	Alexandre Trauner and Edward G. Boyle	Won
1961	Academy Awards	Best Cinematography – Black-and-White	Joseph LaShelle	Nominated
1961	Academy Awards	Best Film Editing	Daniel Mandell	Won
1961	Academy Awards	Best Sound	Gordon E. Sawyer	Nominated
1960	British Academy Film Awards	Best Film		Won
1960	British Academy Film Awards	Best Foreign Actor	Jack Lemmon	Won
1960	British Academy Film Awards	Best Foreign Actress	Shirley MacLaine	Won
1960	Cinema Writers Circle Awards	Best Foreign Film		Won
1960	Directors Guild of America Awards	Outstanding Director - Motion Pictures	Billy Wilder	Won
1960	Golden Globe Awards	Best Motion Picture – Musical or Comedy		Won
1960	Golden Globe Awards	Best Actor in a Motion Picture – Musical or Comedy	Jack Lemmon	Won
1960	Golden Globe Awards	Best Actress in a Motion Picture – Musical or Comedy	Shirley MacLaine	Won
1960	Golden Globe Awards	Best Director – Motion Picture	Billy Wilder	Nominated
1960	Grammy Awards	Best Soundtrack Album	Adolph Deutsch	Nominated
1960	Laurel Awards	Top Comedy		Won
1960	Laurel Awards	Top Male Comedy Performance	Jack Lemmon	Won
1960	Laurel Awards	Top Female Dramatic Performance	Shirley MacLaine	Won
1960	National Board of Review Awards	Top Ten Films		8th Place
1960	National Film Preservation Board	National Film Registry		Inducted
1960	New York Film Critics Circle Awards	Best Film		Won (Note: Tied with Sons and Lovers.)
1960	New York Film Critics Circle Awards	Best Director	Billy Wilder	Won (Note: Tied with Jack Cardiff for Sons and Lovers.)
1960	New York Film Critics Circle Awards	Best Screenplay	Billy Wilder and I. A. L. Diamond	Won
1960	Venice International Film Festival	Golden Lion	Billy Wilder	Nominated
1960	Venice International Film Festival	Best Actress	Shirley MacLaine	Won
1960	Writers Guild of America Awards	Best Written American Comedy	Billy Wilder and I. A. L. Diamond	Won

Although Lemmon did not win the Oscar, Kevin Spacey dedicated his Oscar for American Beauty (1999) to Lemmon's performance. According to the behind-the-scenes feature on the American Beauty DVD, the film's director, Sam Mendes, had watched The Apartment (among other classic American films) as inspiration in preparation for shooting his film.

Within a few years after The Apartment's release, the routine use of black-and-white film in Hollywood ended. Since The Apartment only two black-and-white movies have won the Academy Award for Best Picture: Schindler's List (1993) and The Artist (2011) (Oppenheimer was in partial black and white).

In 1994, The Apartment was deemed "culturally, historically, or aesthetically significant" by the United States Library of Congress and selected for preservation in the National Film Registry. In 2002, a poll of film directors conducted by Sight and Sound magazine listed the film as the 14th greatest film of all time (tied with La Dolce Vita). In the 2012 poll by the same magazine directors voted the film 44th greatest of all time. In the most recent 2022 edition of Greatest films of all time poll by the magazine the film was ranked 54th by the critics. The film was included in "The New York Times Guide to the Best 1,000 Movies Ever Made" in 2002. In 2006, Premiere voted this film as one of "The 50 Greatest Comedies Of All Time". In 2006, the Writers Guild of America ranked the film's screenplay (written by Billy Wilder & I.A.L. Diamond.) the 15th greatest ever. In 2015, The Apartment ranked 24th on BBC's "100 Greatest American Films" list, voted on by film critics from around the world. The film was selected as the 27th best comedy of all time in a poll of 253 film critics from 52 countries conducted by the BBC in 2017. In 2016, the Directors Guild of America ranked the film 54th on its list of The 80 Best-Directed Films since the Guild’s founding in 1936.

American Film Institute lists:

- AFI's 100 Years...100 Movies (#93),
- AFI's 100 Years...100 Laughs (#20),
- AFI's 100 Years...100 Passions (#62),
- AFI's 100 Years...100 Movies (10th Anniversary Edition) (#80).

== Stage adaptation ==
In 1968, Burt Bacharach, Hal David and Neil Simon created a musical adaptation titled Promises, Promises which opened on Broadway at the Shubert Theatre in New York City. Starring Jerry Orbach, Jill O'Hara and Edward Winter in the roles of Chuck, Fran and Sheldrake, the production closed in 1972. An all-star revival began in 2010 with Sean Hayes, Kristin Chenoweth and Tony Goldwyn as the three leads; this version added the Bacharach-David compositions "I Say a Little Prayer" and "A House Is Not a Home" to the roster.

== See also ==
- List of American films of 1960
- Life in a... Metro
- Raaste Kaa Patthar
