= Billy Wilder =

Austrian and American filmmaker (1906–2002)

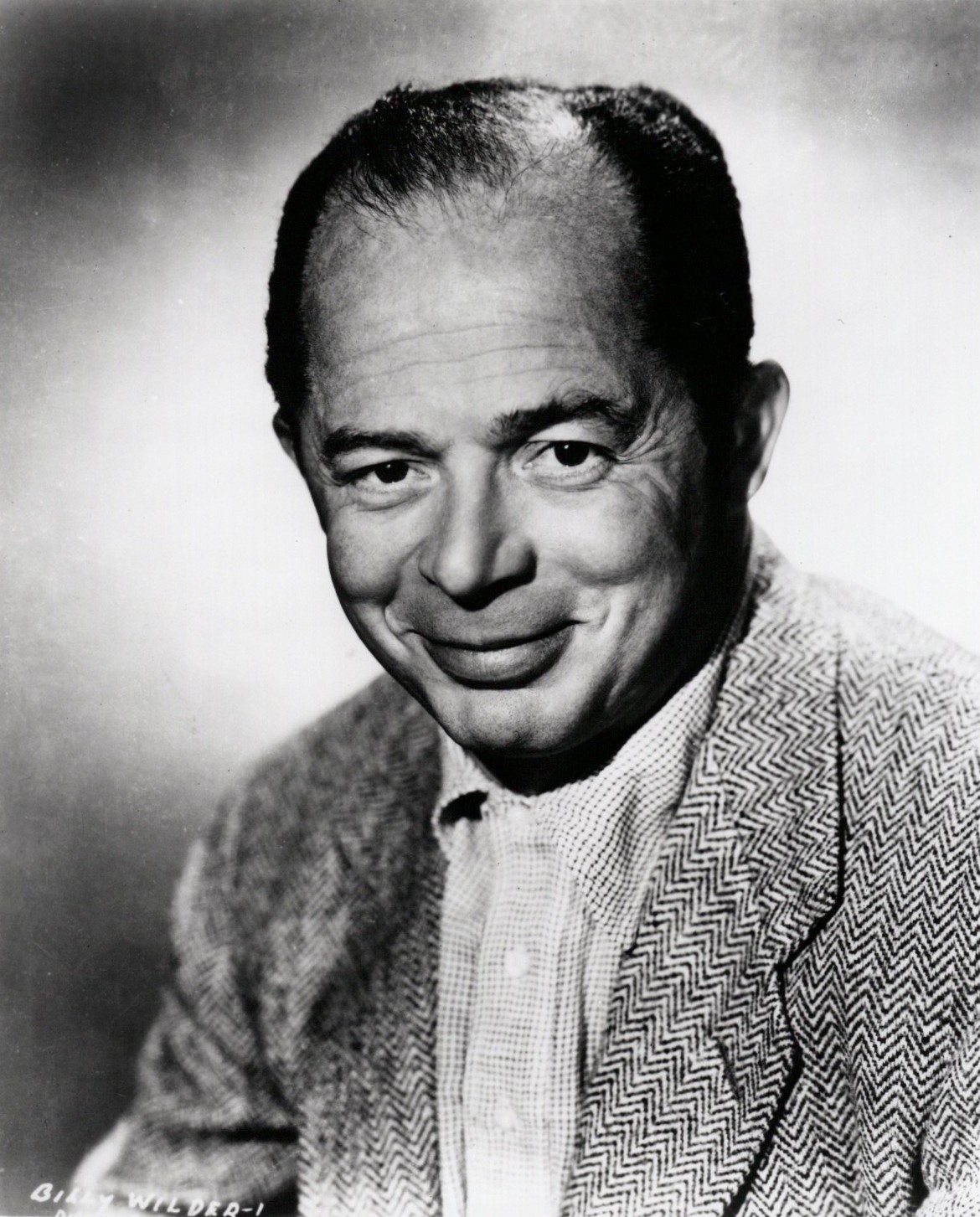
- Born: Samuel Wilder; June 22, 1906; Sucha, Austria-Hungary (now in Poland)
- Died: March 27, 2002 (aged 95); Beverly Hills, California, U.S.
- Citizenship: U.S. (from 1939)
- Occupations: Film director; screenwriter; producer
- Years active: 1929–1981
- Works: Full list
- Spouses: Judith Coppicus (m. 1936; div. 1946) Audrey Young (m. 1949)
- Children: 2
- Relatives: W. Lee Wilder (brother); Myles Wilder (nephew); Patrick Curtis (nephew)
- Awards: Full list

Billy Wilder (Note: /ˈwaɪldər/ WYLE-dər, German: [ˈvɪldɐ].) (born Samuel Wilder; (Note: Yiddish: שמואל װילדער, romanized: Shmuel Vilder.) June 22, 1906 – March 27, 2002) was an Austrian and American film director and screenwriter. His career in Hollywood spanned five decades, and he is regarded as one of America's most versatile filmmakers. He received seven Academy Awards (among 21 nominations), a BAFTA Award and the Palme d'Or.

Wilder was born into a Polish-Jewish family in Sucha, Galicia, Austria-Hungary. In 1916, he moved to Vienna, where he worked as a journalist instead of attending university. Wilder's career as a screenwriter started in Berlin, where he relocated in his early adulthood. The rise of the Nazi Party and antisemitism in Germany saw him move to Paris. Wilder moved to Hollywood in 1934, and had a major hit when he, Charles Brackett and Walter Reisch wrote the screenplay for Ninotchka (1939). He established a reputation as a director and received his first nomination for the Academy Award for Best Director with Double Indemnity (1944), a film noir he cowrote with Raymond Chandler. Wilder won Academy Awards for Best Director, Best Screenplay and Best Picture for The Lost Weekend (1945).

In the 1950s, Wilder directed and co-wrote a string of critically acclaimed films, including Sunset Boulevard (1950), for which he won his second Academy Award for Best Screenplay; Ace in the Hole (1951), Stalag 17 (1953) and Sabrina (1954). He directed and co-wrote three films in 1957: The Spirit of St. Louis, Love in the Afternoon and Witness for the Prosecution. Wilder directed Marilyn Monroe in two films, The Seven Year Itch (1955) and Some Like It Hot (1959). In 1960, he co-wrote, produced and directed The Apartment, which won him Academy Awards for Best Original Screenplay, Best Director and Best Picture.

Wilder received the AFI Life Achievement Award in 1986, the Kennedy Center Honors in 1990, the National Medal of Arts in 1993 and the BAFTA Fellowship Award in 1995. He also received the Directors Guild of America's Lifetime Achievement Award, the Laurel Award for Screenwriting Achievement, and the Producers Guild of America's Lifetime Achievement Award. Seven of Wilder's films are preserved in the National Film Registry of the Library of Congress as being "culturally, historically, or aesthetically significant". Some Like It Hot, The Seven Year Itch and The Apartment were included on AFI's 100 Years...100 Laughs list. His career was chronicled in the American Masters documentary Billy Wilder: The Human Comedy.

== Early life ==
Samuel Wilder was born on June 22, 1906, into a Polish-Jewish family in Sucha, known as Sucha Beskidzka since 1964, a small town in the Kingdom of Galicia and Lodomeria of the Austro-Hungarian Empire. Years later in Hollywood, he described it as being "half an hour from Vienna. By telegraph." His parents were Eugenia (née Dittler), from Zakopane, and Max Wilder, from Stanisławczyk. The couple met in Kraków, where Wilder spent his early years. His mother described him as a "rambunctious kid"; inspired by Buffalo Bill's Wild West shows, which she saw while living briefly in New York, she nicknamed him "Billie", which he changed to "Billy" upon moving to the United States.

Their parents had a successful cake shop in Sucha's train station that flourished into a chain of railroad cafes. Eugenia and Max Wilder did not persuade their son to join the family business. Max moved to Kraków to manage a hotel before moving to Vienna, dying when Billy was 22 years old. After the family moved to Vienna, Wilder became a journalist instead of attending the University of Vienna. In 1926, jazz band leader Paul Whiteman was on tour in Vienna, where he was interviewed by Wilder. Whiteman liked young Wilder enough that he took him with the band to Berlin, where Wilder was able to make more connections in entertainment. Before achieving success as a writer, he was a taxi dancer in Berlin.

== Career ==
=== Early work ===
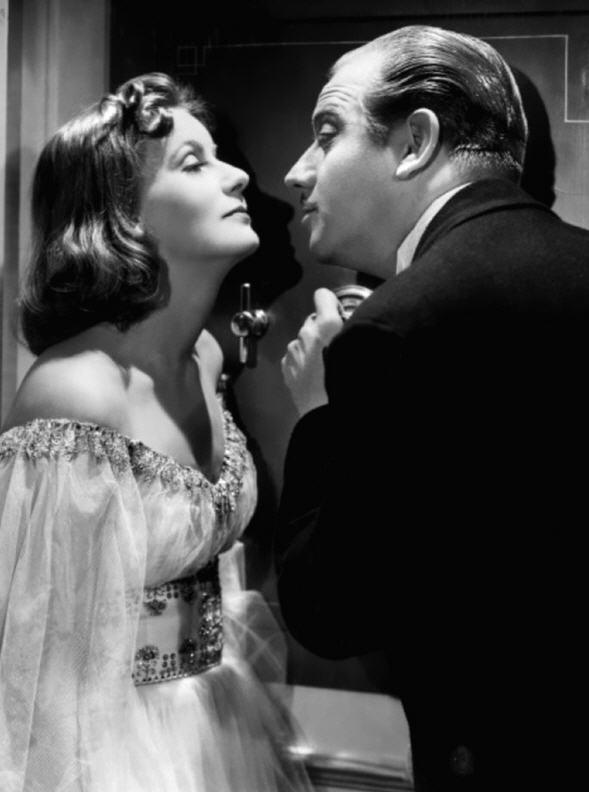
Greta Garbo and Melvyn Douglas in Ninotchka

After writing crime and sports stories as a stringer for local newspapers, he was eventually offered a regular job at a Berlin tabloid. Developing an interest in film, he began working as a screenwriter. From 1929 to 1933, he produced 12 German films. He collaborated with other novices (including Fred Zinnemann and Robert Siodmak) on the 1930 film People on Sunday. Eschewing the German Expressionist styles of F. W. Murnau and Fritz Lang, People on Sunday was considered as a groundbreaking example of the Neue Sachlichkeit or New Objectivity movement in German cinema. This genre of Strassenfilm ("street film") paved way for Italian neorealism and the French New Wave. He wrote the screenplays for the 1931 film adaptation of Erich Kästner's Emil and the Detectives, The Man in Search of His Murderer (1931), Her Grace Commands (1931) and A Blonde Dream (1932), all produced in the Babelsberg Studios in Potsdam near Berlin. In 1932, Wilder collaborated with the writer and journalist Felix Salten on the screenplay for "Scampolo". After Adolf Hitler's rise to power, Wilder went to Paris ("It seemed the wise thing for a Jew to do.") There, he made his directorial debut, Mauvaise Graine (1934).

After arriving in Hollywood in 1934, Wilder continued working as a screenwriter. He became a naturalized citizen of the United States in 1939, having spent time in Mexico waiting for the government after his six-month card expired in 1934, an episode reflected in his Hold Back the Dawn (1941). Wilder's first significant success was Ninotchka, a collaboration with fellow Jewish emigre Ernst Lubitsch. The romantic comedy starred Greta Garbo (generally known as a tragic heroine in melodramas), and was popularly and critically acclaimed. With the tagline "Garbo Laughs!", it took Garbo's career in a new direction. The film marked Wilder's first Academy Award nomination, which he shared with co-writer Charles Brackett. Wilder co-wrote many of his films with Brackett from 1938 to 1950. Brackett described their collaboration process: "The thing to do was suggest an idea, have it torn apart and despised. In a few days, it would be apt to turn up, slightly changed, as Wilder's idea. Once I got adjusted to that way of working, our lives were simpler."

=== 1940s ===
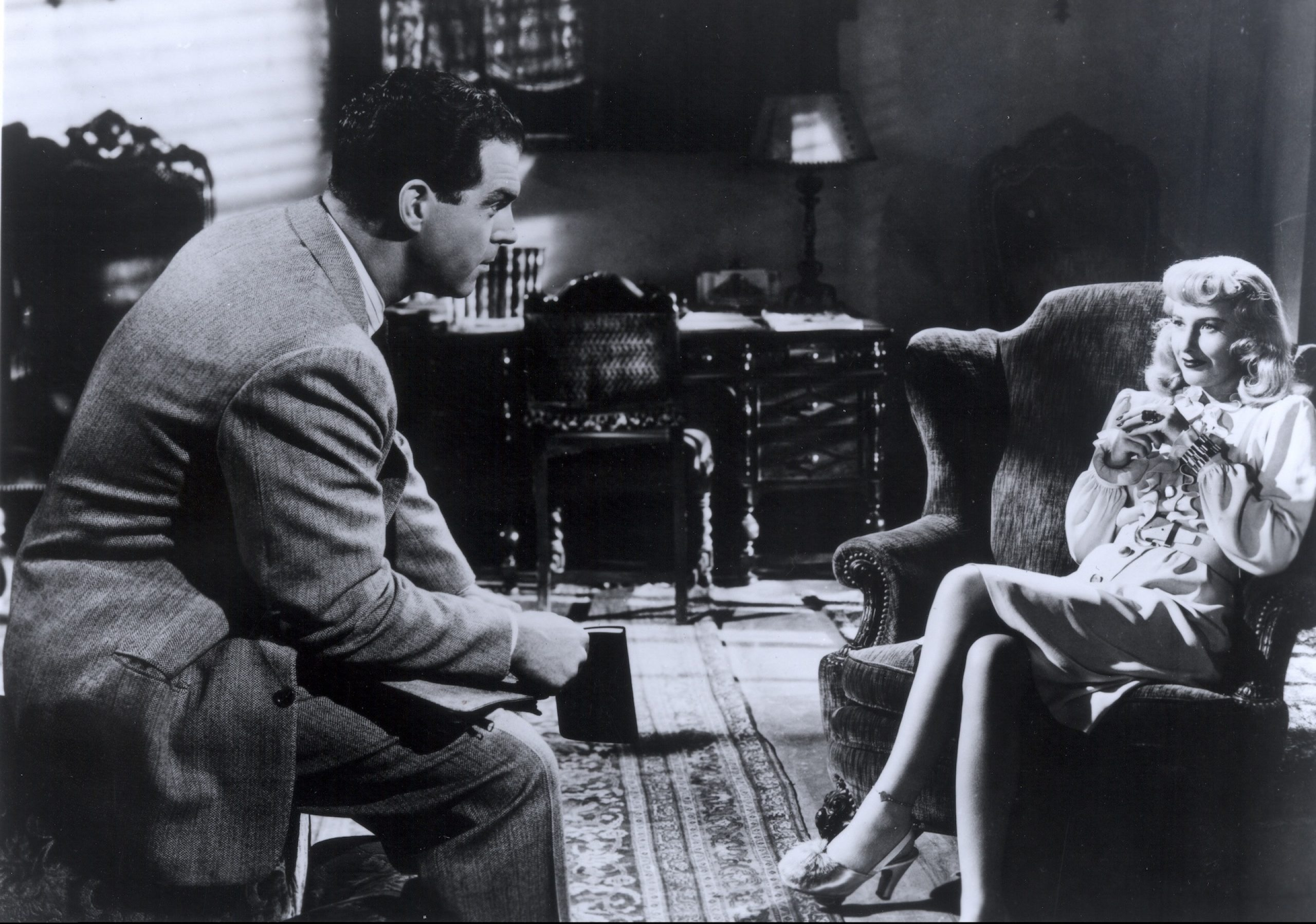
Fred MacMurray and Barbara Stanwyck in Double Indemnity

Wilder continued his screenwriting career with a series of box office hits, including the romantic drama Hold Back the Dawn and the screwball comedy Ball of Fire. Both films earned him nominations for the 1941 Academy Awards for Best Adapted Screenplay and Best Story, respectively. Wilder made his Hollywood directorial debut in 1942 with The Major and the Minor, a comedy starring Ginger Rogers and Ray Milland.

Wilder's mother, stepfather, and grandmother were all victims of the Holocaust. For decades, they were assumed to have been killed at Auschwitz, but while researching Polish and Israeli archives, his Austrian biographer Andreas Hutter discovered in 2011 that they were each murdered in different locations: his mother, Eugenia "Gitla" Siedlisker, in 1943 at Plaszów; his stepfather, Bernard "Berl" Siedlisker, in 1942 at Belzec; and his grandmother, Balbina Baldinger, died in 1943 in the ghetto in Nowy Targ.

Wilder's third Hollywood film as director, the film noir Double Indemnity (1944), starring Fred MacMurray, Barbara Stanwyck and Edward G. Robinson and co-written with Raymond Chandler, was a major hit. It was nominated for seven Academy Awards, including Best Director, Screenplay, Actress and Picture. The film not only set conventions for the noir genre (such as "venetian blind" lighting and voice-over narration), but is a landmark in the battle against Hollywood censorship. Based on James M. Cain's novel, it featured two love triangles and a murder plotted for insurance money. While the book was popular with the reading public, it had been considered unfilmable under the Hays Code because adultery was central to the plot.

In 1945, the Psychological Warfare Department of the United States Department of War produced an American documentary film directed by Wilder. The film known as Death Mills, or Die Todesmühlen, was intended for German audiences to educate them about the atrocities committed by the Nazi regime. For the German version, Die Todesmühlen, Hanuš Burger is credited as the writer and director, while Wilder supervised the editing. Wilder is credited with the English-language version.

Also in 1945, Wilder adapted Charles R. Jackson's novel The Lost Weekend into a film. It was the first major American film with a serious examination of alcoholism, another difficult theme under the Production Code. It follows an alcoholic writer (Ray Milland) opposing the protestations of his girlfriend (Jane Wyman). The premiered at the Cannes Film Festival and competed in the main competition, where it received the Palme d'Or. It won four Academy Awards, including Best Picture. Wilder won Best Director and Best Adapted Screenplay and Milland won Best Actor. The film is one of four to win both Best Picture and the Palme d'Or, alongside Marty, Parasite and Anora.

=== 1950s ===
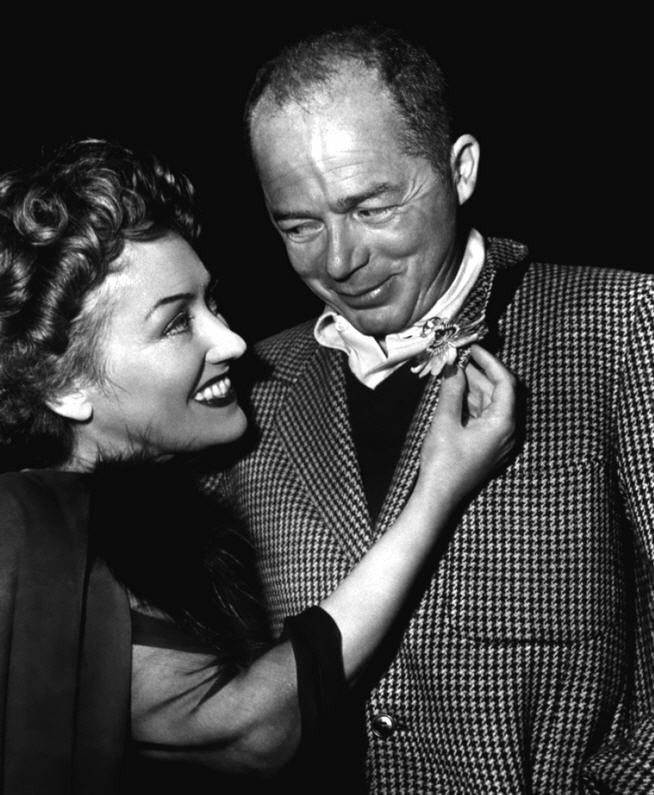
Gloria Swanson with Wilder on the set of Sunset Boulevard

In 1950, Wilder co-wrote and directed the cynical noir Sunset Boulevard. It follows a reclusive silent film star (Gloria Swanson) with delusions of greatness from a bygone era, who dreams of a comeback. An aspiring screenwriter (William Holden) finds refuge at her decaying manse and agrees to write her next picture. It was the final film on which Wilder collaborated with Brackett. It was nominated for eleven Academy Awards; Wilder and Brackett won Best Original Screenplay.

In 1951, Wilder directed Ace in the Hole (a.k.a. The Big Carnival) starring Kirk Douglas in a tale of media exploitation of a caving accident. The idea had been pitched over the phone to Wilder's secretary by Victor Desny. Desny sued Wilder for breach of an implied contract in the California copyright case Wilder v Desny, ultimately receiving a settlement of $14,350. Although a critical and commercial failure at the time, its reputation has grown over the years. The following year, Wilder announced plans to direct and produce a film version of Sophocles's Oedipus Rex, adapted for the screen by Walter Reisch. They planned to shoot the film on location in Greece in Technicolor, but it never went into production.

Subsequently, Wilder directed three adaptations of Broadway plays: war drama Stalag 17, for which William Holden won the Best Actor Academy Award, romantic comedy Sabrina, for which Audrey Hepburn was nominated for Best Actress, and romantic comedy The Seven Year Itch, which features the iconic image of Marilyn Monroe standing on a subway grate as her white dress is blown upwards by a passing train. Wilder was nominated for the Academy Award for Best Director for the first two films and shared a nomination for Best Screenplay for the second. He was interested in doing a film with one of the classic slapstick comedy acts of the Hollywood Golden Age. He first considered, and rejected, a project to star Laurel and Hardy. He held discussions with Groucho Marx concerning a new Marx Brothers comedy, tentatively titled A Day at the U.N. The project was abandoned after Chico Marx died in 1961.

In 1957, three films Wilder directed were released: biopic The Spirit of St. Louis, starring James Stewart as Charles Lindbergh, romantic comedy Love in the Afternoon—Wilder's first screenplay with I. A. L. Diamond, who would become his regular partner—featuring Gary Cooper, Maurice Chevalier and Audrey Hepburn, and courtroom drama Witness for the Prosecution, featuring Tyrone Power, Marlene Dietrich and Charles Laughton. Wilder received an Academy Award nomination for Best Director for the last film.

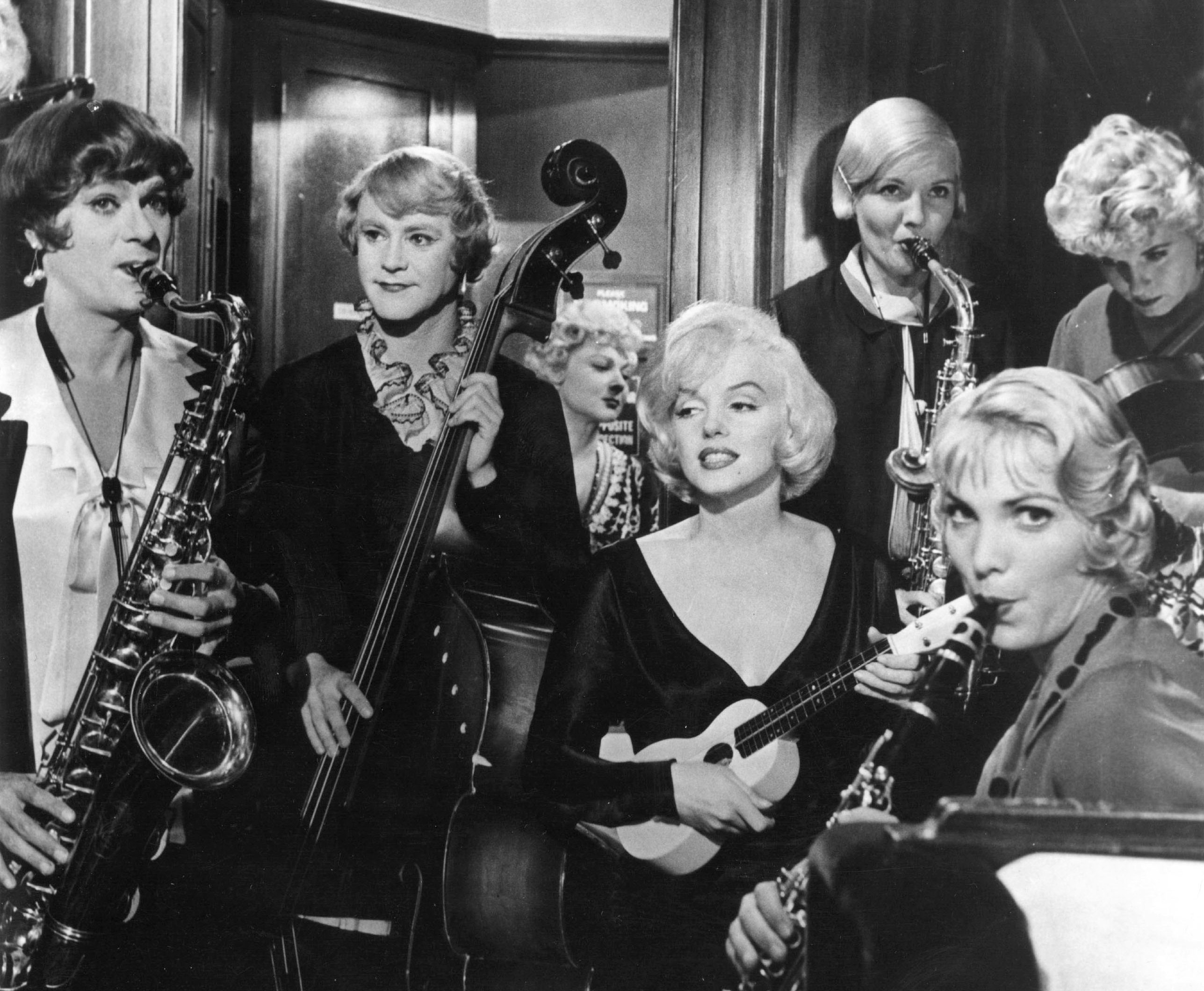
Curtis, Lemmon, and Monroe in Some Like It Hot

In 1959, Wilder reunited with Monroe in the United Artists-released Prohibition-era farce Some Like It Hot. It was released, however, without a Production Code seal of approval, which was withheld due to the film's unabashed sexual comedy, including a central cross-dressing theme. Jack Lemmon and Tony Curtis played musicians disguised as women to escape pursuit by a Chicago gang. Curtis's character courts a singer (Monroe), while Lemmon is wooed by Joe E. Brown. This sets up the last line: Lemmon reveals that he is a man and Brown replies "Well, nobody's perfect".

=== 1960s ===
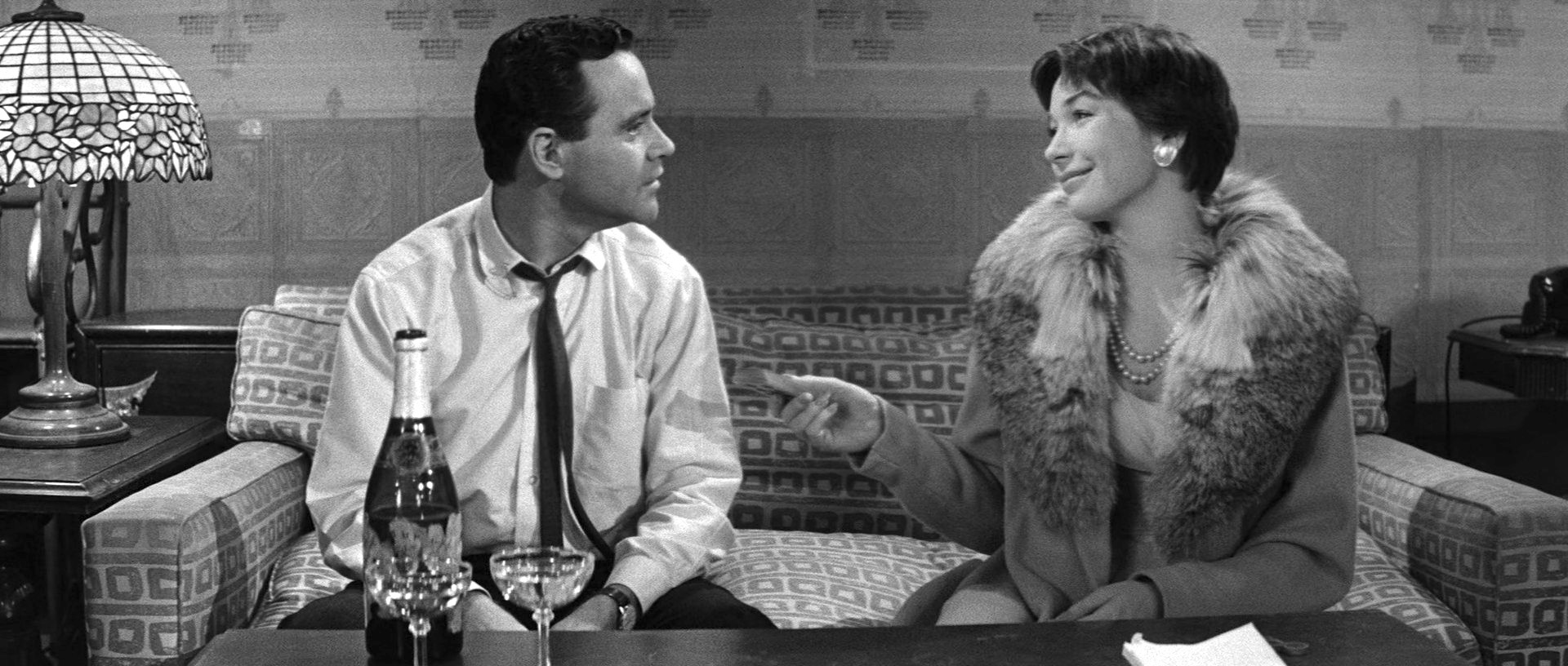
Lemmon and Shirley MacLaine in The Apartment

In 1960, Wilder directed the comedy romance film The Apartment. It follows an insurance clerk (Lemmon), who allows his coworkers to use his apartment to conduct extramarital affairs until he meets an elevator woman (Shirley MacLaine). The film was a critical success; Bosley Crowther called it "gleeful, tender, and even sentimental" and Wilder's direction "ingenious". It was nominated for ten Academy Awards and won five, including Best Director, Best Screenplay and Best Picture.

Wilder directed the Cold War political farce One, Two, Three (1961), starring James Cagney, which won critical praise with Variety writing, "Billy Wilder's One, Two, Three is a fast-paced, high-pitched, hard-hitting, lighthearted farce crammed with topical gags and spiced with satirical overtones. Story is so furiously quick-witted that some of its wit gets snarled and smothered in overlap." It was followed by the romantic comedy Irma la Douce (1963) starring Lemmon and MacLaine. The film was the fifth-highest-grossing film of the year. Wilder received a Writers Guild of America Award nomination for his screenplay. Wilder then wrote and directed the sex comedy film Kiss Me, Stupid (1964), starring Dean Martin, Kim Novak and Ray Walston, who was a last-minute replacement for ailing Peter Sellers. The film was criticized by some critics for vulgarity, with Crowther blaming the film for giving American movies the reputation of "deliberate and degenerate corruptors of public taste and morals". A. H. Weiler of The New York Times called the film "pitifully unfunny". Wilder gained his final Academy Award nomination and a Writers Guild of America Award nomination for the screenplay of The Fortune Cookie (1966), which he co-produced through his independent film company, Phalanx Productions. It was the first film pairing Jack Lemmon with Walter Matthau. The film was titled Meet Whiplash Willie in the United Kingdom. In 1970, Wilder directed The Private Life of Sherlock Holmes, also made through Phalanx Productions, which was intended as a major roadshow theatrical release, but to his dismay, was heavily cut by the studio.

=== Final films ===
He produced and directed the comedy Avanti! (1972), again through Phalanx Productions, which follows a businessman (Lemmon) attempting to retrieve the body of his deceased father from Italy. Wilder directed The Front Page based on the Broadway play. It was a significant financial success with a low budget. His final films, Fedora and Buddy Buddy, failed to impress critics or the public, although Fedora has since been re-evaluated and is now considered favorably. Wilder had hoped to make Thomas Keneally's Schindler's Ark as his final film, saying, "I wanted to do it as a kind of memorial to my mother and my grandmother and my stepfather," who had all been murdered in the Holocaust. He praised Steven Spielberg's adaptation, Schindler's List. To those who denied the Holocaust, Wilder wrote in a German newspaper, "If the concentration camps and the gas chambers were all imaginary, then please tell me—where is my mother?"

== Style ==
Wilder's directorial choices reflected his belief in the primacy of writing. He avoided, especially in the second half of his career, the exuberant cinematography of Alfred Hitchcock and Orson Welles because, in Wilder's opinion, shots that called attention to themselves would distract the audience from the story. Wilder's films have tight plotting and memorable dialogue. Despite his conservative directorial style, his subject matter often pushed the boundaries of mainstream entertainment. Once a subject was chosen, he would begin to visualize in terms of specific artists. His belief was that no matter how talented the actor, none were without limitations and the result would be better if the script were bent to their personality rather than force a performance beyond their limitations. Wilder was skilled at working with actors, coaxing silent-era legends Gloria Swanson and Erich von Stroheim out of retirement for roles in Sunset Boulevard. Regarding Wilder's more comedic films, Roger Ebert wrote: "he took the characters seriously, or at least as seriously as the material allowed, and got a lot of the laughs by playing scenes straight." Of Some Like it Hot, he writes "The screenplay by Wilder and I.A.L. Diamond is Shakespearean in the way it cuts between high and low comedy, between the heroes and the clowns."

For Stalag 17, Wilder squeezed an Oscar-winning performance out of a reluctant William Holden (Holden had wanted to make his character more likable; Wilder refused). At a casting meeting, Wilder reportedly said, "I'm tired of clichéd typecasting—the same people in every film." An example of such casting against type was Wilder's choice of Fred MacMurray in Double Indemnity and The Apartment. MacMurray had become Hollywood's highest-paid actor portraying a decent, thoughtful character in light comedies, melodramas, and musicals; Wilder cast him as a womanizing schemer. Humphrey Bogart shed his tough-guy image to give one of his warmest performances in Sabrina. James Cagney was memorable in a high-octane comic role for Wilder's One, Two, Three. Ebert writes that "Billy Wilder once asked Jack Lemmon for 'a little less' so many takes in a row that Lemmon finally exploded: 'Whaddya want! Nothing?' Lemmon recalls that Wilder raised his eyes to heaven: 'Please God!'"

In total, he directed 14 different actors in Oscar-nominated performances: Barbara Stanwyck in Double Indemnity, Ray Milland in The Lost Weekend, William Holden in Sunset Boulevard and Stalag 17, Gloria Swanson, Erich von Stroheim, and Nancy Olson in Sunset Boulevard, Robert Strauss in Stalag 17, Audrey Hepburn in Sabrina, Charles Laughton and Elsa Lanchester in Witness for the Prosecution, Jack Lemmon in Some Like It Hot and The Apartment, Jack Kruschen in The Apartment, Shirley MacLaine in The Apartment and Irma la Douce, and Walter Matthau in The Fortune Cookie. Wilder mentored Lemmon and was the first director to pair him with Matthau, in The Fortune Cookie. Wilder and Lemmon worked on seven films.

== Politics ==
Wilder opposed the House Un-American Activities Committee (HUAC). He co-created the Committee for the First Amendment, of 500 Hollywood personalities and stars to "support those professionals called upon to testify before the HUAC who had classified themselves as hostile with regard to the interrogations and the interrogators". Some anti-Communists wanted those in the film industry to take oaths of allegiance. The Screen Directors Guild had a vote by show of hands. Only John Huston and Wilder opposed. Huston said, "I am sure it was one of the bravest things that Billy, as a naturalized German, had ever done. There were 150 to 200 directors at this meeting, and here Billy and I sat alone with our hands raised in protest against the loyalty oath."

Wilder was not affected by the Hollywood blacklist, although he opposed the persecution and only ever said of the blacklisted Hollywood Ten: "Of the ten, two had talent, and the rest were just unfriendly." In general, Wilder disliked formula and genre films. Wilder reveled in poking fun at those who took politics too seriously. In Ball of Fire, his burlesque queen Sugarpuss points at her sore throat and complains "Pink? It's as red as the Daily Worker and just as sore." Later, she gives the overbearing and unsmiling housemaid the name "Franco".

== Retirement ==
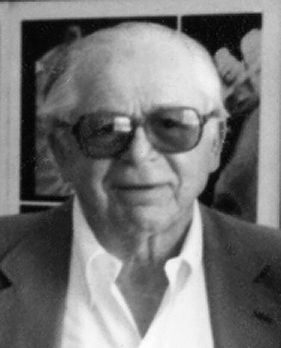
Wilder in 1989

Wilder received the American Film Institute (AFI) Life Achievement Award in 1986. He received the Irving G. Thalberg Memorial Award in 1988, the Kennedy Center Honors in 1990, and the National Medal of Arts in 1993. He has a star on the Hollywood Walk of Fame. Wilder became well known for owning one of the finest and most extensive art collections in Hollywood, mainly collecting modern art. As he described it in the mid-'80s, "It's a sickness. I don't know how to stop myself. Call it bulimia if you want – or curiosity or passion. I have some Impressionists, some Picassos from every period, some mobiles by Calder. I also collect tiny Japanese trees, glass paperweights, and Chinese vases. Name an object and I collect it." Wilder's artistic ambitions led him to create a series of works of his own. By the early '90s, Wilder had amassed many plastic-artistic constructions, many of which were made in collaboration with artist Bruce Houston. In 1993, art dealer Louis Stern, a longtime friend, helped organize an exhibition of Wilder's work at his Beverly Hills gallery. The exhibition was titled Billy Wilder's Marché aux Puces and the Variations on the Theme of Queen Nefertete segment was notably popular. This series featured busts of the Egyptian queen wrapped à la Christo, or splattered à la Jackson Pollock, or sporting a Campbell's soup can in homage to Andy Warhol.

== Personal life and death ==
Wilder married Judith Coppicus on December 22, 1936. The couple had twins, Victoria and Vincent (born 1939), but Vincent died shortly after birth. They divorced in 1946. Wilder met Audrey Young while filming The Lost Weekend. They were married on June 30, 1949.

Wilder's elder brother, W. Lee Wilder, was also a filmmaker.

Wilder died of pneumonia on March 27, 2002. He was buried at Pierce Brothers Westwood Village Memorial Park and Mortuary. French newspaper Le Monde titled its front-page obituary: "Billy Wilder is dead. Nobody is perfect".

== Legacy ==
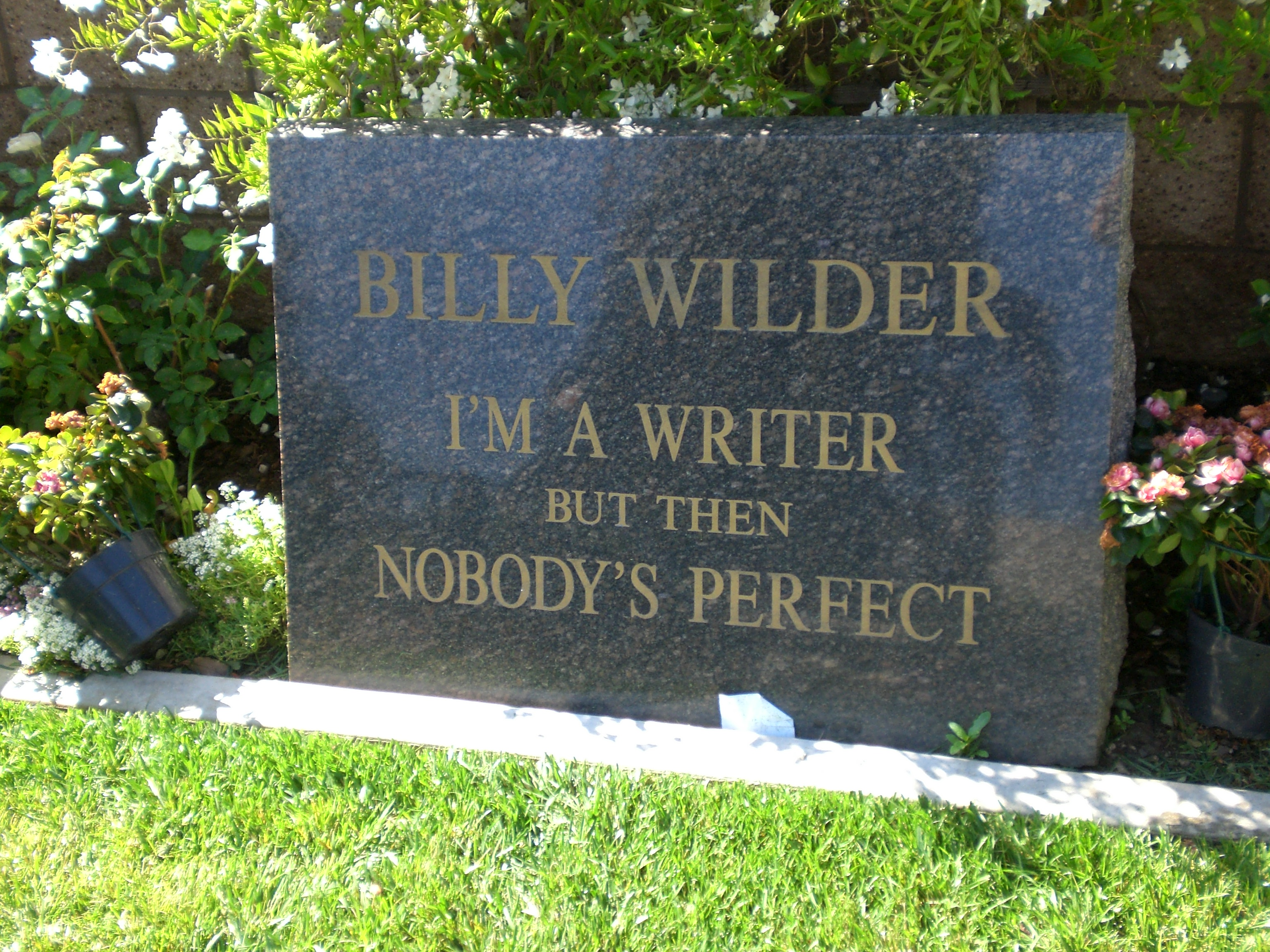
Wilder's grave in Westwood Village Memorial Park

"Don't be boring". — Billy Wilder

Wilder holds a significant place in the history of Hollywood censorship for expanding the range of acceptable subject matter. He directed two of film noir's definitive films, Double Indemnity and Sunset Boulevard. Along with Woody Allen and the Marx Brothers, he leads the list of films on the American Film Institute's AFI's 100 Years...100 Laughs and he earned the top spot on it with Some Like It Hot. Also on the list are The Apartment and The Seven Year Itch, which he directed, and Ball of Fire and Ninotchka, which he co-wrote. The AFI listed Double Indemnity, Sunset Boulevard, Some Like It Hot and The Apartment on AFI's 100 Years... 100 Movies. Wilder placed 7th on Sight & Sound's director's poll of The Greatest Directors of All Time. Wilder was ranked at No. 19 on Empire's Top 40 Greatest Directors of All-Time list in 2005. In 2007, Total Film magazine ranked Wilder at number 13 on its 100 Greatest Film Directors Ever list. Wilder was voted at number four on the Greatest Directors of 20th Century poll conducted by Japanese film magazine Kinema Junpo. In 2012, the decennial Sight and Sound poll of the world's film critics rated Some Like it Hot as the 43rd-best movie ever made, and the second-highest-ranking comedy. Sunset Boulevard placed at number 63.

Seven of his films are preserved in the United States National Film Registry of the Library of Congress as being "culturally, historically or aesthetically significant". Anthony Lane writes that Double Indemnity, The Seven Year Itch, Sunset Boulevard' and The Apartment are "part of the lexicon of moviegoing" and that Some Like It Hot is a "national treasure." Roger Ebert asked, "Of all the great directors of Hollywood's golden age, has anybody made more films that are as fresh and entertaining to this day as Billy Wilder's?...And who else can field three contenders among the greatest closing lines of all time?", citing the closing lines of Sunset Boulevard, Some Like It Hot and The Apartment.

When Belle Époque won the 1993 Academy Award for Best Foreign Language Film, Spanish filmmaker Fernando Trueba said in his acceptance speech: "I would like to believe in God in order to thank him. But I just believe in Billy Wilder... so thank you, Mr. Wilder." According to Trueba, Wilder called him the day after and told him: "Fernando, it's God." French filmmaker Michel Hazanavicius thanked Billy Wilder in the 2012 Best Picture acceptance speech for The Artist: "I would like to thank the following three people, I would like to thank Billy Wilder, I would like to thank Billy Wilder, and I would like to thank Billy Wilder." Wilder's 12 Academy Award nominations for screenwriting were a record until 1997 when Woody Allen received a 13th nomination for Deconstructing Harry. In 2017, Vulture named Wilder the greatest screenwriter of all time. Ron Shelton recalls Stanley Donen introducing him to Wilder after the release of Bull Durham. Wilder told him, "Great fuckin' picture, kid!" Shelton said, "Mr. Wilder, that's the best review I've ever had!"

Wilder's epitaph, a paraphrase of the last line of Some Like It Hot, is "I'm a writer but then nobody's perfect."

== Filmography ==
Directed features
Year	Title
1934	Mauvaise Graine
1942	The Major and the Minor
1943	Five Graves to Cairo
1944	Double Indemnity
1945	The Lost Weekend
1948	The Emperor Waltz
1948	A Foreign Affair
1950	Sunset Boulevard
1951	Ace in the Hole
1953	Stalag 17
1954	Sabrina
1955	The Seven Year Itch
1957	The Spirit of St. Louis
1957	Love in the Afternoon
1957	Witness for the Prosecution
1959	Some Like It Hot
1960	The Apartment
1961	One, Two, Three
1963	Irma la Douce
1964	Kiss Me, Stupid
1966	The Fortune Cookie
1970	The Private Life of Sherlock Holmes
1972	Avanti!
1974	The Front Page
1978	Fedora
1981	Buddy Buddy

== Awards and honors ==
Wilder received twenty-one nominations at the Academy Awards, winning six. In total, he received twelve nominations for his screenwriting, eight for his direction, and one for producing. He won Best Director and the Best Original Screenplay for The Lost Weekend (1945) and The Apartment (1960). The former was awarded the Palme d'Or at the Cannes Film Festival. Wilder garnered eight Directors Guild of America Award nominations, with the sole win for his work on The Apartment. He won seven Writers Guild of America Awards including two Laurel Awards for Screenwriting Achievement. He garnered a number of lifetime achievement awards including the Irving G. Thalberg Memorial Award, the BAFTA Fellowship, the David O. Selznick Achievement Award in Theatrical Motion Pictures, and the Honorary Golden Bear from the Berlin International Film Festival.

Awards and nominations received by Wilder's motion pictures
Year	Motion Picture	Oscars		BAFTAs		Golden Globes	
Year	Motion Picture	Nominations	Wins	Nominations	Wins	Nominations	Wins
1943	Five Graves to Cairo	3					
1944	Double Indemnity	7					
1945	The Lost Weekend	7	4			3	3
1948	The Emperor Waltz	2					
1948	A Foreign Affair	2					
1950	Sunset Boulevard	11	3			7	4
1951	Ace in the Hole	1					
1953	Stalag 17	3	1				
1954	Sabrina	6	1	1		1	1
1955	The Seven Year Itch			1		1	1
1957	The Spirit of St. Louis	1					
1957	Love in the Afternoon					3	
1957	Witness for the Prosecution	6		1		5	1
1959	Some Like It Hot	6	1	2	1	3	3
1960	The Apartment	10	5	3	3	4	3
1961	One, Two, Three	1				2	
1963	Irma la Douce	3	1	1		3	1
1966	The Fortune Cookie	4	1			1	
1972	Avanti!					6	1
1974	The Front Page					3	
Total		73	17	9	4	42	18

=== Oscar-related performances ===
Under Wilder's direction, these actors have received Oscar nominations and wins for their performances in their respective roles.

AMPAS acting awards and nominations for Billy Wilder films, by category and year
Year	Performer	Motion picture	Result	Academy Award
1946	Ray Milland	The Lost Weekend	Won	Best Actor
1951	William Holden	Sunset Boulevard	Nominated	Best Actor
1954	William Holden	Stalag 17	Won	Best Actor
1958	Charles Laughton	Witness for the Prosecution	Nominated	Best Actor
1960	Jack Lemmon	Some Like It Hot	Nominated	Best Actor
1961	Jack Lemmon	The Apartment	Nominated	Best Actor
1945	Barbara Stanwyck	Double Indemnity	Nominated	Best Actress
1951	Gloria Swanson	Sunset Boulevard	Nominated	Best Actress
1955	Audrey Hepburn	Sabrina	Nominated	Best Actress
1961	Shirley MacLaine	The Apartment	Nominated	Best Actress
1964	Shirley MacLaine	Irma la Douce	Nominated	Best Actress
1951	Erich von Stroheim	Sunset Boulevard	Nominated	Best Supporting Actor
1961	Jack Kruschen	The Apartment	Nominated	Best Supporting Actor
1967	Walter Matthau	The Fortune Cookie	Won	Best Supporting Actor
1951	Nancy Olson	Sunset Boulevard	Nominated	Best Supporting Actress
1958	Elsa Lanchester	Witness for the Prosecution	Nominated	Best Supporting Actress

== See also ==
- List of film director and actor collaborations
- List of refugees

== Bibliography ==
- Brackett, Charles (2014). Slide, Anthony (ed.). "It's the Pictures That Got Small": Charles Brackett on Billy Wilder and Hollywood's Golden Age. Columbia University Press. doi:10.7312/slid16708. ISBN 978-0-231-16708-6. JSTOR 10.7312/slid16708.
- Lane, Anthony (2002). Nobody's Perfect. Alfred A. Knopf. ISBN 0-375-41448-7.
- Sikov, Ed (1998). On Sunset Boulevard: The Life and Times of Billy Wilder. New York: Hyperion. ISBN 0-7868-6194-0.
