= New York Film Critics Circle Award for Best Actress =

Award

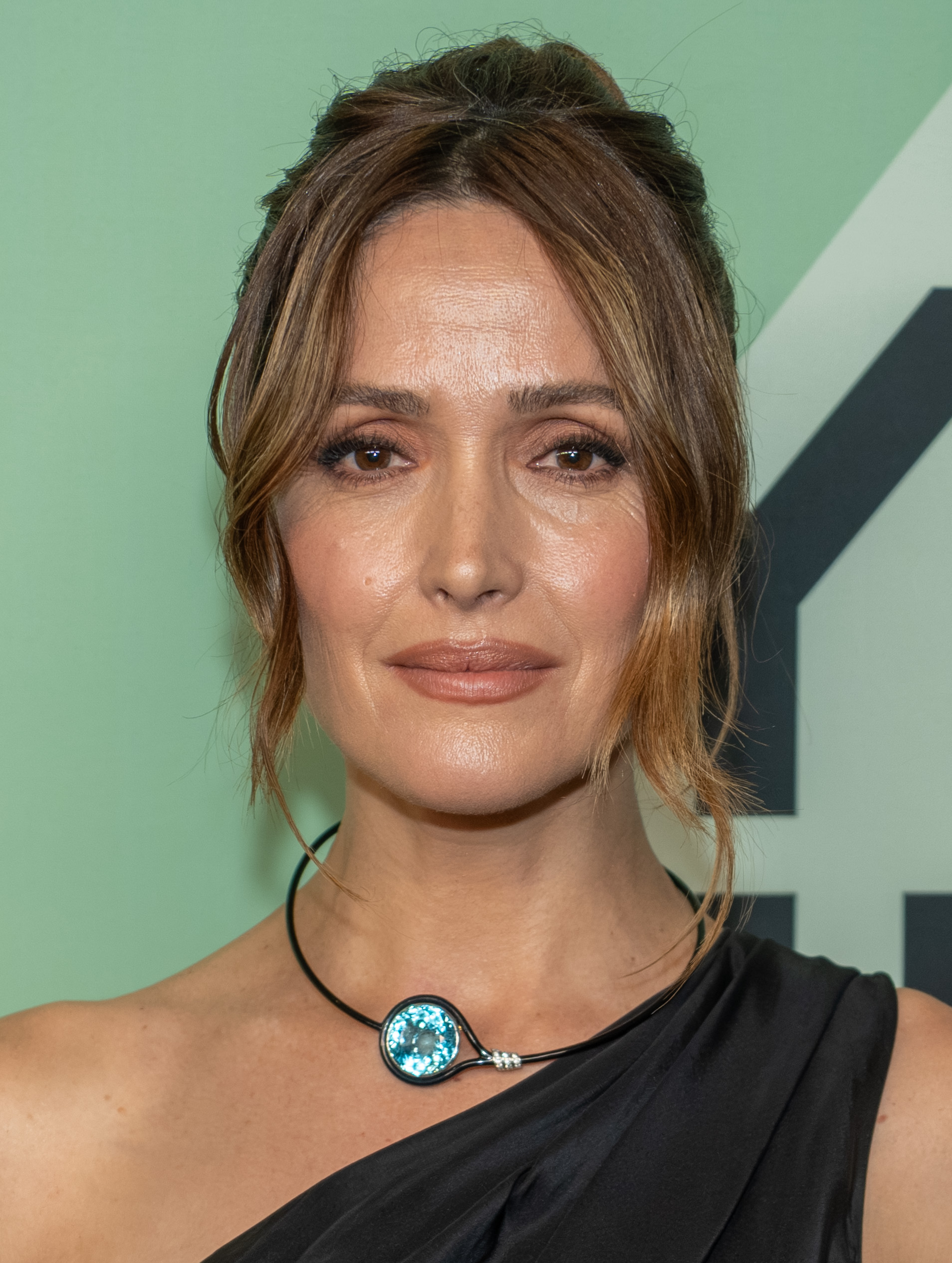
- Current recipient: Rose Byrne
- Awarded for: Best Performance by an Actress in a Leading Role
- Country: United States
- Presented by: New York Film Critics Circle
- First award: Greta Garbo; Anna Karenina (1935)
- Currently held by: Rose Byrne; If I Had Legs I'd Kick You (2025)
- Website: nyfcc.com

The New York Film Critics Circle Award for Best Actress is one of the awards given by the New York Film Critics Circle to honor the finest achievements in film-making.

== Winners ==
=== 1930s ===
Year	Winner	Role	Film
1935	Greta Garbo	Anna Karenina	Anna Karenina
1936	Luise Rainer	Anna Held	The Great Ziegfeld
1937	Greta Garbo	Marguerite Gautier	Camille
1938	Margaret Sullavan	Patricia "Pat" Hollmann	Three Comrades
1939	Vivien Leigh	Scarlett O'Hara	Gone with the Wind

=== 1940s ===
Year	Winner	Role	Film
1940	Katharine Hepburn	Tracy Lord	The Philadelphia Story
1941	Joan Fontaine	Lina McLaidlaw Aysgarth	Suspicion
1942	Agnes Moorehead	Fanny	The Magnificent Ambersons
1943	Ida Lupino	Helen Chernen	The Hard Way
1944	Tallulah Bankhead	Constance "Connie" Porter	Lifeboat
1945	Ingrid Bergman	Sister Mary Benedict	The Bells of St. Mary's
1945	Ingrid Bergman	Constance Petersen	Spellbound
1946	Celia Johnson	Laura Jesson	Brief Encounter
1947	Deborah Kerr	Sister Clodagh	Black Narcissus
1947	Deborah Kerr	Bridie Quilty	I See a Dark Stranger
1948	Olivia de Havilland	Virginia Stuart Cunningham	The Snake Pit
1949	Olivia de Havilland	Catherine Sloper	The Heiress

=== 1950s ===
Year	Winner	Role	Film
1950	Bette Davis	Margo Channing	All About Eve
1951	Vivien Leigh	Blanche DuBois	A Streetcar Named Desire
1952	Shirley Booth	Lola Delaney	Come Back, Little Sheba
1953	Audrey Hepburn	Princess Ann	Roman Holiday
1954	Grace Kelly	Georgie Elgin	The Country Girl
1954	Grace Kelly	Margot Wendice	Dial M for Murder
1954	Grace Kelly	Lisa Carol Fremont	Rear Window
1955	Anna Magnani	Serafina Delle Rose	The Rose Tattoo
1956	Ingrid Bergman	Anna Koreff / Grand Duchess Anastasia	Anastasia
1957	Deborah Kerr	Sister Angela	Heaven Knows, Mr. Allison
1958	Susan Hayward	Barbara Graham	I Want to Live!
1959	Audrey Hepburn	Sister Luke (Gabrielle van der Mal)	The Nun's Story

=== 1960s ===
Year	Winner	Role	Film
1960	Deborah Kerr	Ida Carmody	The Sundowners
1961	Sophia Loren	Cesira	Two Women
1962	No award given (newspaper strike)		
1963	Patricia Neal	Alma Brown	Hud
1964	Kim Stanley	Myra Savage	Séance on a Wet Afternoon
1965	Julie Christie	Diana Scott	Darling
1966	Elizabeth Taylor	Martha	Who's Afraid of Virginia Woolf?
1966	Lynn Redgrave	Georgy	Georgy Girl
1967	Edith Evans	Maggie Ross	The Whisperers
1968	Joanne Woodward	Rachel Cameron	Rachel, Rachel
1969	Jane Fonda	Gloria Beatty	They Shoot Horses, Don't They?

=== 1970s ===
Year	Winner	Role	Film
1970	Glenda Jackson	Gudrun Brangwen	Women in Love
1971	Jane Fonda	Bree Daniels	Klute
1972	Liv Ullmann	Maria	Cries and Whispers (Viskningar och rop)
1972	Liv Ullmann	Kristina Nilsson	The Emigrants (Utvandrarna)
1973	Joanne Woodward	Rita Walden	Summer Wishes, Winter Dreams
1974	Liv Ullmann	Marianne	Scenes from a Marriage (Scener ur ett äktenskap)
1975	Isabelle Adjani	Adèle Hugo / Adèle Lewry	The Story of Adele H.
1976	Liv Ullmann	Dr. Jenny Isaksson	Face to Face (Ansikte mot ansikte)
1977	Diane Keaton	Annie Hall	Annie Hall
1978	Ingrid Bergman	Charlotte Andergast	Autumn Sonata (Höstsonaten)
1979	Sally Field	Norma Rae Webster	Norma Rae

=== 1980s ===
Year	Winner	Role	Film
1980	Sissy Spacek	Loretta Lynn	Coal Miner's Daughter
1981	Glenda Jackson	Stevie Smith	Stevie
1982	Meryl Streep	Zofia "Sophie" Zawistowski	Sophie's Choice
1983	Shirley MacLaine	Aurora Greenway	Terms of Endearment
1984	Peggy Ashcroft	Mrs. Moore	A Passage to India
1985	Norma Aleandro	Alicia Marnet de Ibáñez	The Official Story (La historia oficial)
1986	Sissy Spacek	Babe Botrelle	Crimes of the Heart
1987	Holly Hunter	Jane Craig	Broadcast News
1988	Meryl Streep	Lindy Chamberlain	A Cry in the Dark
1989	Michelle Pfeiffer	Susie Diamond	The Fabulous Baker Boys

=== 1990s ===
Year	Winner	Role	Film
1990	Joanne Woodward	India Bridge	Mr. & Mrs. Bridge
1991	Jodie Foster	Clarice Starling	The Silence of the Lambs
1992	Emma Thompson	Margaret Schlegel	Howards End
1993	Holly Hunter	Ada McGrath	The Piano
1994	Linda Fiorentino	Bridget Gregory / Wendy Kroy	The Last Seduction
1995	Jennifer Jason Leigh	Sadie Flood	Georgia
1996	Emily Watson	Bess McNeill	Breaking the Waves
1997	Julie Christie	Phyllis Mann	Afterglow
1998	Cameron Diaz	Mary Jensen	There's Something About Mary
1999	Hilary Swank	Brandon Teena	Boys Don't Cry

=== 2000s ===
Year	Winner	Role	Film
2000	Laura Linney	Samantha "Sammy" Prescott	You Can Count on Me
2001	Sissy Spacek	Ruth Fowler	In the Bedroom
2002	Diane Lane	Constance "Connie" Sumner	Unfaithful
2003	Hope Davis	Joyce Brabner	American Splendor
2003	Hope Davis	Dana Hurst	The Secret Lives of Dentists
2004	Imelda Staunton	Vera Drake	Vera Drake
2005	Reese Witherspoon	June Carter Cash	Walk the Line
2006	Helen Mirren	Queen Elizabeth II	The Queen
2007	Julie Christie	Fiona Anderson	Away from Her
2008	Sally Hawkins	Pauline "Poppy" Cross	Happy-Go-Lucky
2009	Meryl Streep	Julia Child	Julie & Julia

=== 2010s ===
Year	Winner	Role	Film
2010	Annette Bening	Dr. Nicole "Nic" Allgood	The Kids Are All Right
2011	Meryl Streep	Margaret Thatcher	The Iron Lady
2012	Rachel Weisz	Hester Collyer	The Deep Blue Sea
2013	Cate Blanchett	Jeanette "Jasmine" Francis	Blue Jasmine
2012	Marion Cotillard	Ewa Cybulska	The Immigrant
2012	Marion Cotillard	Sandra	Two Days, One Night
2015	Saoirse Ronan	Eilis Lacey	Brooklyn
2016	Isabelle Huppert	Michèle Leblanc	Elle
2017	Saoirse Ronan	Christine "Lady Bird" McPherson	Lady Bird
2018	Regina Hall	Lisa Conroy	Support the Girls
2019	Lupita Nyong'o	Adelaide Wilson / Red	Us

=== 2020s ===
Year	Winner	Role	Film
2020	Sidney Flanigan	Autumn Callahan	Never Rarely Sometimes Always
2021	Lady Gaga	Patrizia Reggiani	House of Gucci
2022	Cate Blanchett	Lydia Tár	Tár
2023	Lily Gladstone	Mollie Kyle	Killers of the Flower Moon
2024	Marianne Jean-Baptiste	Pansy Deacon	Hard Truths
2025	Rose Byrne	Linda	If I Had Legs I'd Kick You

== Multiple awards ==
4 wins

- Meryl Streep (1982, 1988, 2009, 2011)

3 wins

- Ingrid Bergman (1945, 1956, 1978)
- Julie Christie (1965, 1997, 2007)
- Deborah Kerr (1947, 1957, 1960)
- Sissy Spacek (1980, 1986, 2001)
- Liv Ullmann (1972, 1974, 1976)
- Joanne Woodward (1968, 1973, 1990)

2 wins

- Cate Blanchett (2013, 2022)
- Olivia de Havilland (1948, 1949)
- Jane Fonda (1969, 1971)
- Greta Garbo (1935, 1937)
- Audrey Hepburn (1953, 1959)
- Holly Hunter (1987, 1993)
- Glenda Jackson (1970, 1981)
- Vivien Leigh (1939, 1951)
- Saoirse Ronan (2015, 2017)

== See also ==
- Academy Award for Best Actress
- National Board of Review Award for Best Actress
- National Society of Film Critics Award for Best Actress
- Los Angeles Film Critics Association Award for Best Actress
