= New York Film Critics Circle Award for Best Actor =

Award

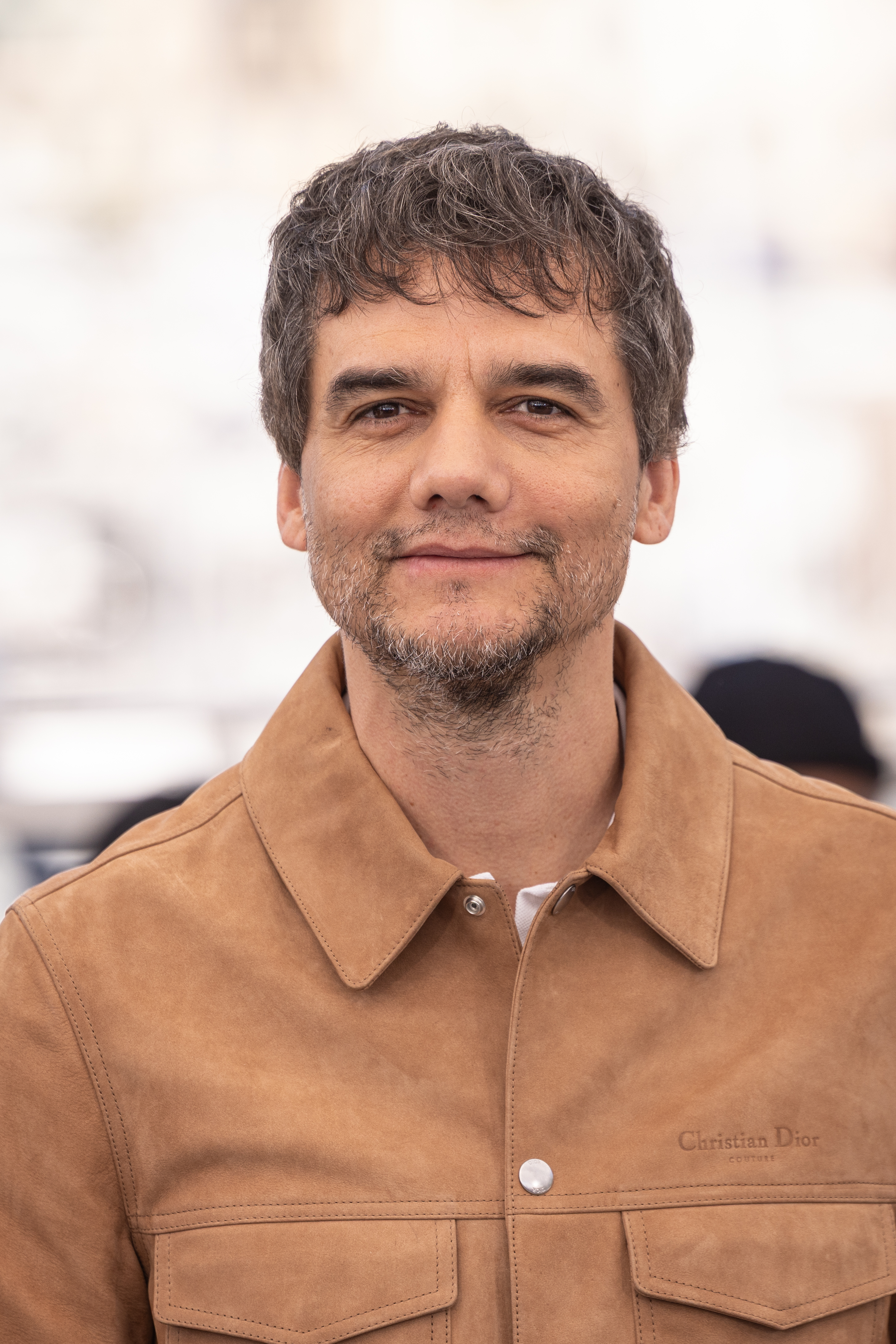
- Current recipient: Wagner Moura
- Awarded for: Best Performance by an Actor in a Leading Role
- Country: United States
- Presented by: New York Film Critics Circle
- First award: Charles Laughton; Mutiny on the Bounty (1935)
- Currently held by: Wagner Moura; The Secret Agent (2025)
- Website: nyfcc.com

The New York Film Critics Circle Award for Best Actor is one of the awards given by the New York Film Critics Circle to honor the finest achievements in film-making.

== Winners ==
=== 1930s ===
Year	Winner	Role	Film
1935	Charles Laughton	Captain William Bligh	Mutiny on the Bounty
1935	Charles Laughton	Marmaduke Ruggles	Ruggles of Red Gap
1936	Walter Huston	Sam Dodsworth	Dodsworth
1937	Paul Muni	Émile Zola	The Life of Emile Zola
1938	James Cagney	Rocky Sullivan	Angels with Dirty Faces
1939	James Stewart	Jefferson "Jeff" Smith	Mr. Smith Goes to Washington

=== 1940s ===
Year	Winner	Role	Film
1940	Charlie Chaplin	Hynkel – Dictator of Tomania / Jewish Barber	The Great Dictator
1941	Gary Cooper	Alvin York	Sergeant York
1942	James Cagney	George M. Cohan	Yankee Doodle Dandy
1943	Paul Lukas	Kurt Muller	Watch on the Rhine
1944	Barry Fitzgerald	Father Fitzgibbon	Going My Way
1945	Ray Milland	Don Birnam	The Lost Weekend
1946	Laurence Olivier	King Henry V of England	Henry V
1947	William Powell	Clarence Day, Sr.	Life with Father
1947	William Powell	Senator Melvin G. Ashton	The Senator Was Indiscreet
1948	Laurence Olivier	Hamlet	Hamlet
1949	Broderick Crawford	Willie Stark	All the King's Men

=== 1950s ===
Year	Winner	Role	Film
1950	Gregory Peck	Frank Savage	Twelve O'Clock High
1951	Arthur Kennedy	Larry Nevins	Bright Victory
1952	Ralph Richardson	John Ridgefield	The Sound Barrier
1953	Burt Lancaster	First Sergeant Milton Warden	From Here to Eternity
1954	Marlon Brando	Terry Malloy	On the Waterfront
1955	Ernest Borgnine	Marty Piletti	Marty
1956	Kirk Douglas	Vincent van Gogh	Lust for Life
1957	Alec Guinness	Lieutenant Colonel Nicholson	The Bridge on the River Kwai
1958	David Niven	Angus Pollock	Separate Tables
1959	James Stewart	Paul Biegler	Anatomy of a Murder

=== 1960s ===
Year	Winner	Role	Film
1960	Burt Lancaster	Elmer Gantry	Elmer Gantry
1961	Maximilian Schell	Hans Rolfe	Judgment at Nuremberg
1962	No award given (newspaper strike)		
1963	Albert Finney	Tom Jones	Tom Jones
1964	Rex Harrison	Henry Higgins	My Fair Lady
1965	Oskar Werner	Willie Schumann	Ship of Fools
1966	Paul Scofield	Sir Thomas More	A Man for All Seasons
1967	Rod Steiger	Police Chief Bill Gillespie	In the Heat of the Night
1968	Alan Arkin	John Singer	The Heart Is a Lonely Hunter
1969	Jon Voight	Joe Buck	Midnight Cowboy

=== 1970s ===
Year	Winner	Role	Film
1970	George C. Scott	George S. Patton, Jr.	Patton
1971	Gene Hackman	Jimmy "Popeye" Doyle	The French Connection
1972	Laurence Olivier	Andrew Wyke	Sleuth
1973	Marlon Brando	Paul	Last Tango in Paris (Ultimo tango a Parigi)
1974	Jack Nicholson	J. J. "Jake" Gittes	Chinatown
1974	Jack Nicholson	Signalman 1st Class Billy "Badass" Buddusky	The Last Detail
1975	Jack Nicholson	Randle McMurphy	One Flew Over the Cuckoo's Nest
1976	Robert De Niro	Travis Bickle	Taxi Driver
1977	John Gielgud	Clive Langham	Providence
1978	Jon Voight	Luke Martin	Coming Home
1979	Dustin Hoffman	Ted Kramer	Kramer vs. Kramer

=== 1980s ===
Year	Winner	Role	Film
1980	Robert De Niro	Jake LaMotta	Raging Bull
1981	Burt Lancaster	Lou Pascal	Atlantic City
1982	Ben Kingsley	Mahatma Gandhi	Gandhi
1983	Robert Duvall	Mac Sledge	Tender Mercies
1984	Steve Martin	Roger Cobb	All of Me
1985	Jack Nicholson	Charley Partanna	Prizzi's Honor
1986	Bob Hoskins	George Mortwell	Mona Lisa
1987	Jack Nicholson	Francis Phelan	Ironweed
1988	Jeremy Irons	Beverly Mantle / Elliot Mantle	Dead Ringers
1989	Daniel Day-Lewis	Christy Brown	My Left Foot

=== 1990s ===
Year	Winner	Role	Film
1990	Robert De Niro	Leonard Lowe	Awakenings
1990	Robert De Niro	James "Jimmy the Gent" Conway	Goodfellas
1991	Anthony Hopkins	Dr. Hannibal Lecter	The Silence of the Lambs
1992	Denzel Washington	Malcolm X	Malcolm X
1993	David Thewlis	Johnny	Naked
1994	Paul Newman	Donald "Sully" Sullivan	Nobody's Fool
1995	Nicolas Cage	Ben Sanderson	Leaving Las Vegas
1996	Geoffrey Rush	David Helfgott	Shine
1997	Peter Fonda	Ulysses "Ulee" Jackson	Ulee's Gold
1998	Nick Nolte	Wade Whitehouse	Affliction
1999	Richard Farnsworth	Alvin Straight	The Straight Story

=== 2000s ===
Year	Winner	Role	Film
2000	Tom Hanks	Chuck Noland	Cast Away
2001	Tom Wilkinson	Matt Fowler	In the Bedroom
2002	Daniel Day-Lewis	William "Bill the Butcher" Cutting	Gangs of New York
2003	Bill Murray	Bob Harris	Lost in Translation
2004	Paul Giamatti	Miles Raymond	Sideways
2005	Heath Ledger	Ennis Del Mar	Brokeback Mountain
2006	Forest Whitaker	Idi Amin	The Last King of Scotland
2007	Daniel Day-Lewis	Daniel Plainview	There Will Be Blood
2008	Sean Penn	Harvey Milk	Milk
2009	George Clooney	Ryan Bingham	Up in the Air

=== 2010s ===
Year	Winner	Role	Film
2010	Colin Firth	King George VI	The King's Speech
2011	Brad Pitt	Billy Beane	Moneyball
2011	Brad Pitt	Mr. O'Brien	The Tree of Life
2012	Daniel Day-Lewis	Abraham Lincoln	Lincoln
2013	Robert Redford	Our Man	All Is Lost
2014	Timothy Spall	J. M. W. Turner	Mr. Turner
2015	Michael Keaton	Walter "Robby" Robinson	Spotlight
2016	Casey Affleck	Lee Chandler	Manchester by the Sea
2017	Timothée Chalamet	Elio Perlman	Call Me by Your Name
2018	Ethan Hawke	Reverend Ernst Toller	First Reformed
2019	Antonio Banderas	Salvador Mallo	Pain and Glory

=== 2020s ===
Year	Winner	Role	Film
2020	Delroy Lindo	Paul	Da 5 Bloods
2021	Benedict Cumberbatch	Phil Burbank	The Power of the Dog
2022	Colin Farrell	Jake	After Yang
2022	Colin Farrell	Pádraic Súilleabháin	The Banshees of Inisherin
2023	Franz Rogowski	Tomas	Passages
2024	Adrien Brody	László Tóth	The Brutalist
2025	Wagner Moura	Armando / Marcelo Alves / Fernando (adult)	The Secret Agent

== Multiple awards ==
=== 4 wins ===
- Daniel Day-Lewis (1989, 2002, 2007, 2012)
- Jack Nicholson (1974, 1975, 1985, 1987)

=== 3 wins ===
- Robert De Niro (1976, 1980, 1990)
- Burt Lancaster (1953, 1960, 1981)
- Laurence Olivier (1946, 1948, 1972)

=== 2 wins ===
- Marlon Brando (1954, 1973)
- James Cagney (1938, 1942)
- James Stewart (1939, 1959)
- Jon Voight (1969, 1978)

== See also ==
- National Board of Review Award for Best Actor
- National Society of Film Critics Award for Best Actor
- Los Angeles Film Critics Association Award for Best Actor
