= New York Film Critics Circle =

American film critic organization

- Abbreviation: NYFCC
- Formation: 1935
- Type: Film criticism
- Location: New York City New York, U.S.
- Official language: English
- Website: nyfcc.com

The New York Film Critics Circle (NYFCC) is an American film critic organization founded in 1935 by Wanda Hale from the New York Daily News. Its membership includes over 30 film critics from New York–based daily and weekly newspapers, magazines, and online publications. In December of each year, the organization meets to vote on the New York Film Critics Circle Awards, given annually to honor excellence in cinema worldwide of the calendar year. The NYFCC also gives special stand-alone awards to individuals and organizations that have made significant contributions to the art of cinema, including writers, directors, producers, film critics, film restorers, historians and service organizations. The NYFCC Awards are the oldest given by film critics in the country, and one of the most prestigious.

== Award ceremonies ==
Note: Dates listed are those of when the awards were actually given. Announcement dates are earlier.

Ceremony	Date	Best Film Winner
1st	March 2, 1936	The Informer
2nd	January 24, 1937	Mr. Deeds Goes to Town
3rd	January 9, 1938	The Life of Emile Zola
4th	January 8, 1939	The Citadel
5th	January 7, 1940	Wuthering Heights
6th	January 5, 1941	The Grapes of Wrath
7th	January 10, 1942	Citizen Kane
8th	January 3, 1943	In Which We Serve
9th	January 21, 1944	Watch on the Rhine
10th	Unknown	Going My Way
11th	January 20, 1946	The Lost Weekend
12th	January 9, 1947	The Best Years of Our Lives
13th	January 19, 1948	Gentleman's Agreement
14th	January 21, 1949	The Treasure of the Sierra Madre
15th	February 5, 1950	All the King's Men
16th	January 28, 1951	All About Eve
17th	January 20, 1952	A Streetcar Named Desire
18th	January 17, 1953	High Noon
19th	January 23, 1954	From Here to Eternity
20th	Unknown	On the Waterfront
21st	January 21, 1956	Marty
22nd	January 19, 1957	Around the World in 80 Days
23rd	Unknown	The Bridge on the River Kwai
24th	January 24, 1959	The Defiant Ones
25th	January 23, 1960	Ben-Hur
26th	January 23, 1961	Sons and Lovers and The Apartment
27th	January 20, 1962	West Side Story
28th	No award	No award
29th	January 18, 1964	Tom Jones
30th	January 23, 1965	My Fair Lady
31st	January 29, 1966	Darling
32nd	January 29, 1967	A Man for All Seasons
33rd	January 28, 1968	In the Heat of the Night
34th	January 26, 1969	The Lion in Winter
35th	January 25, 1970	Z
36th	January 18, 1971	Five Easy Pieces
37th	January 23, 1972	A Clockwork Orange
38th	January 28, 1973	Cries and Whispers
39th	January 27, 1974	Day for Night
40th	January 26, 1975	Amarcord
41st	January 25, 1976	Nashville
42nd	January 30, 1977	All the President's Men
43rd	January 29, 1978	Annie Hall
44th	January 28, 1979	The Deer Hunter
45th	February 1, 1980	Kramer vs. Kramer
46th	January 25, 1981	Ordinary People
47th	January 31, 1982	Reds
48th	January 30, 1983	Gandhi
49th	January 29, 1984	Terms of Endearment
50th	January 27, 1985	A Passage to India
51st	January 26, 1986	Prizzi's Honor
52nd	January 25, 1987	Hannah and Her Sisters
53rd	January 24, 1988	Broadcast News
54th	January 15, 1989	The Accidental Tourist
55th	January 14, 1990	My Left Foot
56th	January 13, 1991	Goodfellas
57th	January 12, 1992	The Silence of the Lambs
58th	January 17, 1993	The Player
59th	January 16, 1994	Schindler's List
60th	January 22, 1995	Quiz Show
61st	January 7, 1996	Leaving Las Vegas
62nd	January 5, 1997	Fargo
63rd	January 4, 1998	L.A. Confidential
64th	January 10, 1999	Saving Private Ryan
65th	January 9, 2000	Topsy-Turvy
66th	January 14, 2001	Traffic
67th	January 6, 2002	Mulholland Drive
68th	January 12, 2003	Far from Heaven
69th	January 11, 2004	The Lord of the Rings: The Return of the King
70th	January 9, 2005	Sideways
71st	January 8, 2006	Brokeback Mountain
72nd	January 7, 2007	United 93
73rd	January 6, 2008	No Country for Old Men
74th	January 5, 2009	Milk
75th	January 11, 2010	The Hurt Locker
76th	January 10, 2011	The Social Network
77th	January 9, 2012	The Artist
78th	January 7, 2013	Zero Dark Thirty
79th	January 6, 2014	American Hustle
80th	January 5, 2015	Boyhood
81st	January 4, 2016	Carol
82nd	January 3, 2017	La La Land
83rd	January 3, 2018	Lady Bird
84th	January 7, 2019	Roma
85th	January 7, 2020	The Irishman
86th	January 24, 2021 (Note: Awards accepted virtually due to the COVID-19 pandemic.)	First Cow
87th	March 16, 2022	Drive My Car
88th	January 4, 2023	Tár
89th	January 3, 2024	Killers of the Flower Moon
90th	January 8, 2025	The Brutalist
91st	January 6, 2026	One Battle After Another

== Award categories ==
=== Current categories ===
- Best Actor
- Best Actress
- Best Animated Film
- Best Cinematography
- Best Director
- Best Film
- Best First Film
- Best Foreign Language Film
- Best Non-Fiction Film (formerly known as Best Documentary Film)
- Best Screenplay
- Best Supporting Actor
- Best Supporting Actress

=== Former categories ===
- Best New Director

== See also ==
- Trifecta (film awards)
- Los Angeles Film Critics Association
