= Deborah Kerr =

Scottish actress (1921–2007)

Deborah Kerr CBE
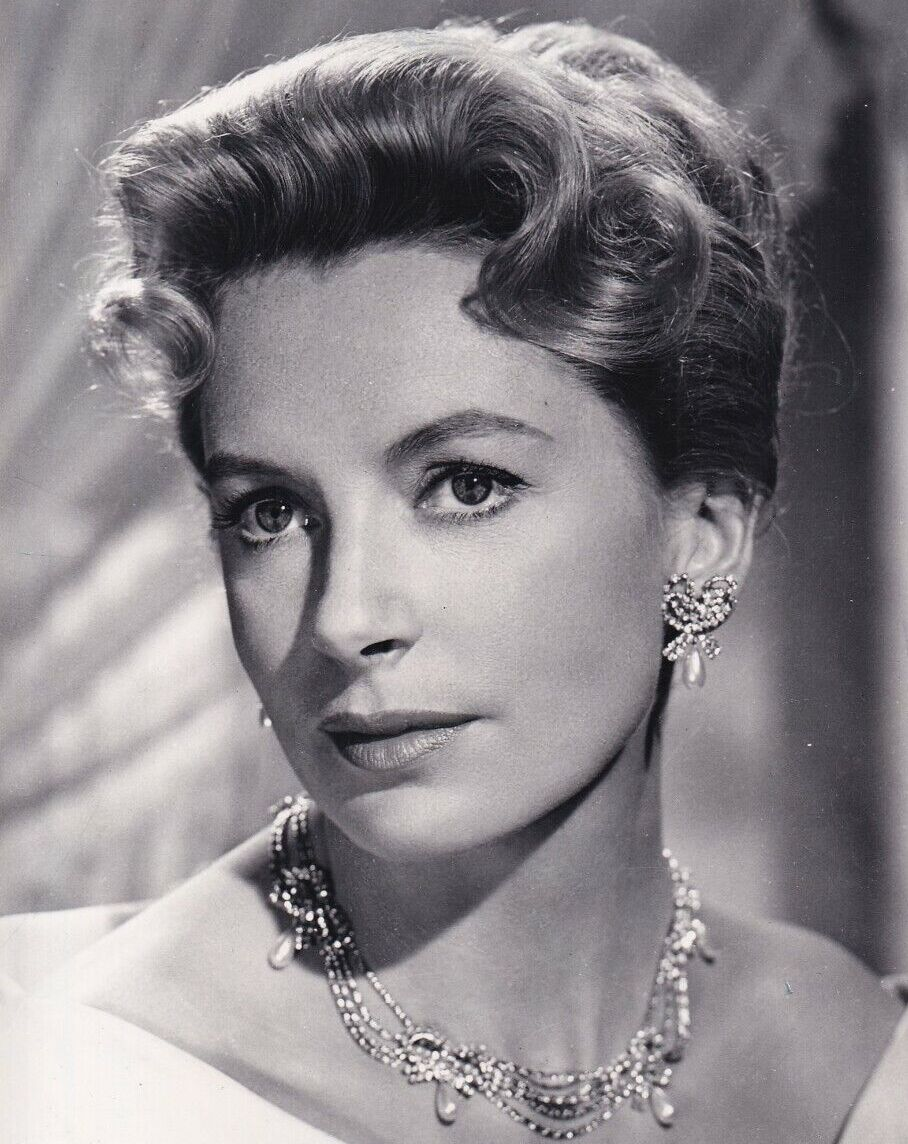
- Kerr in 1958
- Born: Deborah Jane Trimmer; 30 September 1921; Hillhead, Glasgow, Scotland
- Died: 16 October 2007 (aged 86); Botesdale, Suffolk, England
- Resting place: Alfold Cemetery, Alfold, Surrey, England
- Occupation: Actress
- Years active: 1937–1986
- Spouses: Tony Bartley (m. 1945; div. 1959) Peter Viertel (m. 1960)
- Children: 2, including Melanie Bartley
- Relatives: Lex Shrapnel (grandson)

Deborah Jane Trimmer (30 September 1921 – 16 October 2007), known professionally as Deborah Kerr (/kɑː/), was a British actress. Kerr rose to fame for her portrayals of proper, ladylike women, who often navigated societal expectations and stereotypes. Kerr attracted wide praise for her work, earning six Academy Award nominations for Best Actress. She was regarded as one of the best actresses of her generation. From the 1940s to the 1960s, she was one of the most popular actresses in the world.

Following a brief career as a ballerina, Kerr moved to the stage and acted in various Shakespeare productions and small plays before making her film debut in Major Barbara (1941). This led to additional leading roles which raised her profile, such as Love on the Dole (1941), Hatter's Castle (1942), and The Day Will Dawn (1942). In 1943, Kerr played three roles in Michael Powell and Emeric Pressburger's romantic-war drama The Life and Death of Colonel Blimp, which consistently ranks among the greatest British films of all time. Following major successes in the spy comedy I See a Dark Stranger (1946) and psychological drama Black Narcissus (1947), Kerr transitioned to Hollywood under the helm of Metro-Goldwyn-Mayer Studios (MGM).

Following the lukewarm success of her debut Hollywood features, The Hucksters and If Winter Comes, both in 1947, Kerr found critical praise in Edward, My Son (1949), for which she received her first Academy Award nomination for Best Actress, becoming the first Scottish person to be nominated for an acting Oscar. Though she found major commercial success in King Solomon's Mines (1950) and Quo Vadis (1951), the latter the highest grossing film of 1951, reviews were often lackluster for her performances, highlighting her typecasting. In 1953, Kerr had a critical resurgence in the major hit From Here to Eternity, which reestablished her as a serious actress and earned her a second Academy Award nomination for Best Actress.

Throughout the 1950s, Kerr starred in a string of major commercial and critical successes. She earned three consecutive Academy Award nominations for The King and I (1956), Heaven Knows, Mr. Allison (1957), and Separate Tables (1958). She also appeared in the progressive drama Tea and Sympathy (1956), in which she had starred on Broadway in 1953. Later, the romantic classic An Affair to Remember (1957). By the 1960s, her career had slowed, though she remained somewhat prominent in film due to successful roles in The Sundowners (1960 - her 6th Oscar nomination), The Grass Is Greener (1960), The Innocents (1961), The Chalk Garden (1964) and The Night of the Iguana (1964). She made sporadic appearances in films and television (earning an Emmy nomination for A Woman of Substance in 1984) until The Assam Garden in 1985, which was her final film role.

Kerr received numerous accolades throughout her career, including two Golden Globe Awards and nominations for six Academy Awards, four British Academy Film Awards, and an Emmy Award. In 1994, having already received honorary awards from the Cannes Film Festival and BAFTA, Kerr received an Academy Honorary Award with a citation recognizing her as "an artist of impeccable grace and beauty, a dedicated actress whose motion picture career has always stood for perfection, discipline and elegance."

== Early life ==
Deborah Jane Trimmer was born on 30 September 1921 in Hillhead, Glasgow, the only daughter of Kathleen Rose (née Smale) and Capt. Arthur Charles Kerr Trimmer, a World War I veteran and pilot who lost a leg at the Battle of the Somme and later became a naval architect and civil engineer. Trimmer and Smale married, both aged 28, on 21 August 1919 in Smale's hometown of Lydney, Gloucestershire.

Young Deborah spent the first three years of her life in the Scottish west coast town of Helensburgh, where her parents lived with Deborah's grandparents in a house on West King Street. Kerr had a younger brother, Edmund Charles (born 31 May 1926), who became a journalist. He died, aged 78, in a road rage incident in 2004.

Kerr was educated at the independent Northumberland House School, Henleaze in Bristol, England, and at Rossholme School, Weston-super-Mare. Kerr originally trained as a ballet dancer, first appearing on stage at Sadler's Wells in 1938. After changing careers, she soon found success as an actress. Her first acting teacher was her aunt, Phyllis Smale, who worked at a drama school in Bristol run by Lally Cuthbert Hicks. She adopted the name "Deborah Kerr" on becoming a film actress ("Kerr" was a family name going back to the maternal grandmother of her grandfather Arthur Kerr Trimmer).

== Early career ==
=== Early theatre and film ===
Kerr's first stage appearance was at Weston-super-Mare in 1937, as "Harlequin" in the mime play Harlequin and Columbine. She then went to the Sadler's Wells ballet school and in 1938 made her début in the corps de ballet in Prometheus. After various walk-on parts in Shakespeare productions at the Open Air Theatre in Regent's Park, London, she joined the Oxford Playhouse repertory company in 1940, playing, inter alia, "Margaret" in Dear Brutus and "Patty Moss" in The Two Bouquets.

Kerr's first film role was in the British production Contraband (US: Blackout, 1940), aged 18 or 19, but her scenes were cut. She had a strong supporting role in Major Barbara (1941) directed by Gabriel Pascal.

=== Film stardom ===
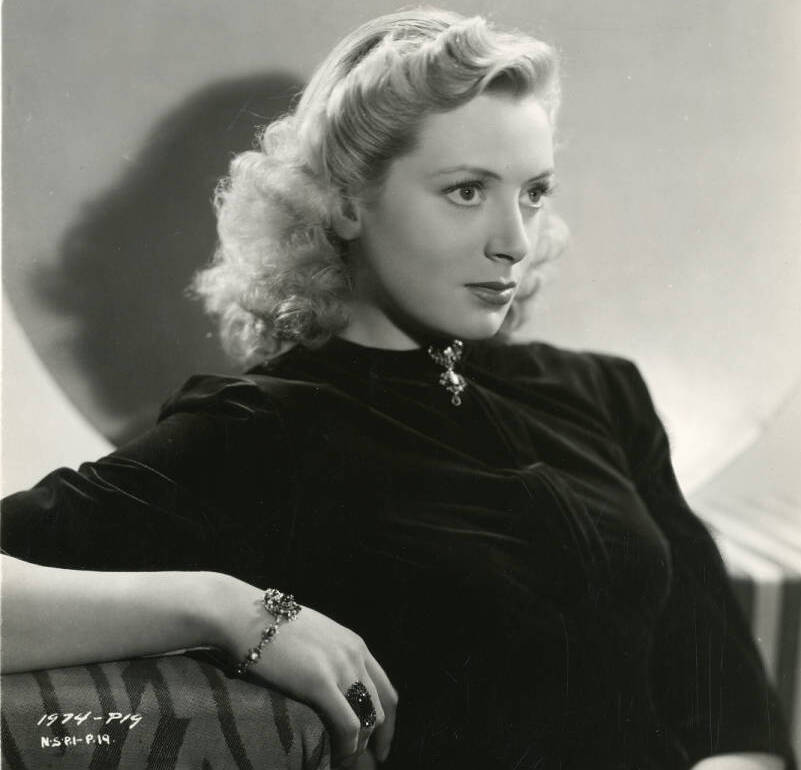
Kerr in 1942

Kerr became known playing the lead role in the film of Love on the Dole (1941). Critic James Agate wrote that Love on the Dole "is not within a mile of Wendy Hiller's in the theatre, but it is a charming piece of work by a very pretty and promising beginner, so pretty and so promising that there is the usual yapping about a new star".

She was the female lead in Penn of Pennsylvania (1941) which was little seen; however Hatter's Castle (1942), in which she starred with Robert Newton and James Mason, was very successful. She played a Norwegian resistance fighter in The Day Will Dawn (1942). She was an immediate hit with the public: an American film trade paper reported in 1942 that she was the most popular British actress with Americans.

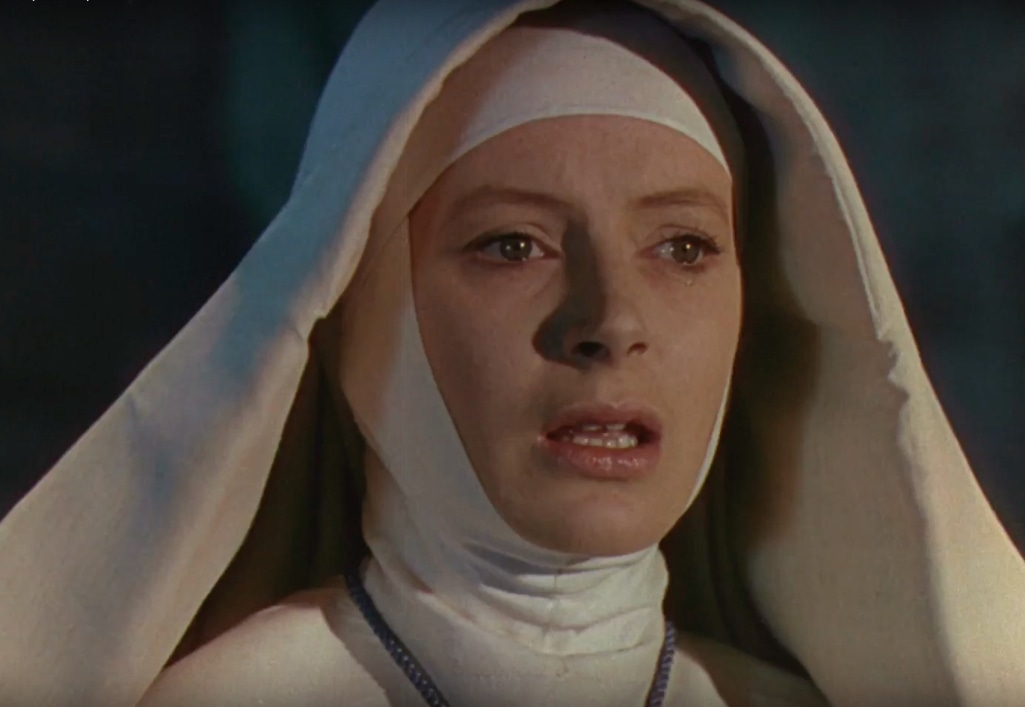
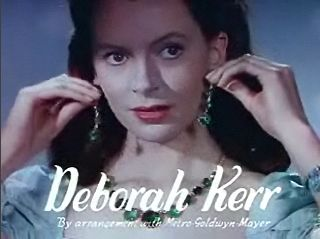
Kerr in Black Narcissus (1947)

Kerr played three women in Michael Powell and Emeric Pressburger's The Life and Death of Colonel Blimp (1943). During the filming, according to Powell's autobiography, Powell and she became lovers: "I realised that Deborah was both the ideal and the flesh-and-blood woman whom I had been searching for". Kerr made clear that her surname should be pronounced the same as "car". To avoid confusion over pronunciation, Louis B. Mayer, head of Metro-Goldwyn-Mayer billed her as "Kerr rhymes with Star!" Although the British Army refused to co-operate with the producers—and Winston Churchill thought the film would ruin wartime morale—Colonel Blimp confounded critics when it proved to be an artistic and commercial success.

Powell hoped to reunite Kerr and lead actor Roger Livesey in his next film, A Canterbury Tale (1944), but her agent had sold her contract to Metro-Goldwyn-Mayer. According to Powell, his affair with Kerr ended when she made it clear to him that she would accept an offer to go to Hollywood if one were made.

In 1943, aged 21, Kerr made her West End début as Ellie Dunn in a revival of Heartbreak House at the Cambridge Theatre, stealing attention from stalwarts such as Edith Evans and Isabel Jeans. "She has the rare gift", wrote critic Beverley Baxter, "of thinking her lines, not merely remembering them. The process of development from a romantic, silly girl to a hard, disillusioned woman in three hours was moving and convincing".

Near the end of the Second World War, she also toured Netherlands, France, and Belgium for ENSA as Mrs Manningham in Gaslight (retitled Angel Street), and Britain (with Stewart Granger).

Alexander Korda cast her opposite Robert Donat in Perfect Strangers (1945). The film was a big hit in Britain. So too was the spy comedy drama I See a Dark Stranger (1946), in which she gave a breezy, amusing performance that dominated the action and overshadowed her co-star Trevor Howard. This film was a production of the team of Frank Launder and Sidney Gilliat.

Her role as a troubled nun in the Powell and Pressburger production of Black Narcissus (1947) brought her to the attention of Hollywood producers. The film was a hit in the US, as well as the UK, and Kerr won the New York Film Critics Award as Actress of the Year. British exhibitors voted her the eighth-most popular local star at the box-office in 1947. She relocated to Hollywood and was under contract to Metro-Goldwyn-Mayer.

== Hollywood ==
=== Metro-Goldwyn-Mayer ===
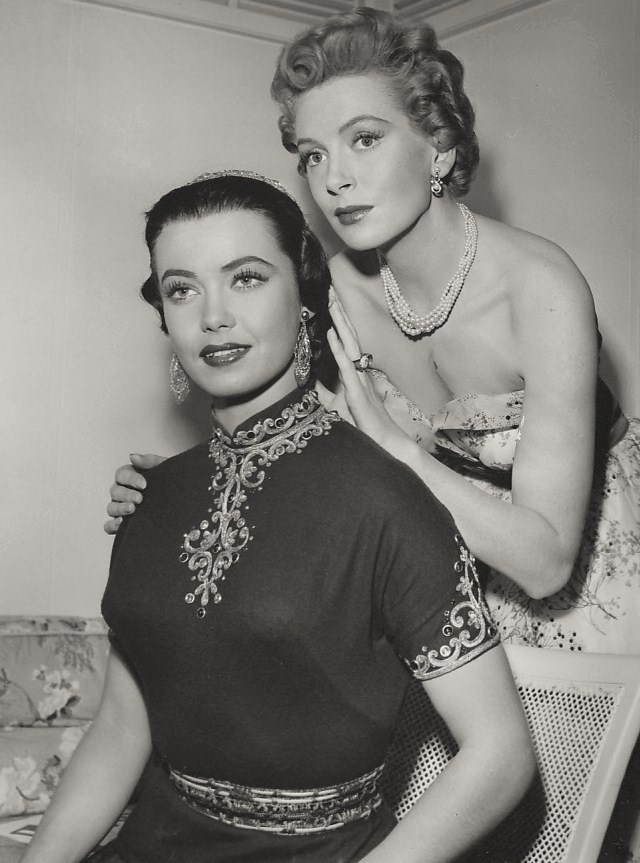
Kerr with Betta St. John (left) in Dream Wife (1953)

Kerr's first film for MGM in Hollywood was a mature satire of the burgeoning advertising industry, The Hucksters (1947) with Clark Gable and Ava Gardner. She and Walter Pidgeon were cast in If Winter Comes (1947). She received the first of her Oscar nominations for Edward, My Son (1949), a drama set and filmed in England co-starring Spencer Tracy.

In Hollywood, Kerr's British accent and manner led to a succession of roles portraying refined, reserved, and "proper" English ladies. Kerr, nevertheless, used any opportunity to discard her cool exterior. She had the lead in a comedy Please Believe Me (1950).

Kerr appeared in two huge hits for MGM in a row. King Solomon's Mines (1950) was shot on location in Africa with Stewart Granger and Richard Carlson. This was immediately followed by her appearance in the religious epic Quo Vadis (1951), shot at Cinecittà in Rome, in which she played the indomitable Lygia, a first-century Christian.

She then played Princess Flavia in a remake of The Prisoner of Zenda (1952) with Granger and Mason. In between Paramount borrowed her to appear in Thunder in the East (1951) with Alan Ladd.

In 1953, Kerr "showed her theatrical mettle" as Portia in Joseph Mankiewicz's Julius Caesar. She made Young Bess (1953) with Granger and Jean Simmons, then appeared alongside Cary Grant in Dream Wife (1953), a flop comedy.

=== From Here to Eternity and Broadway ===
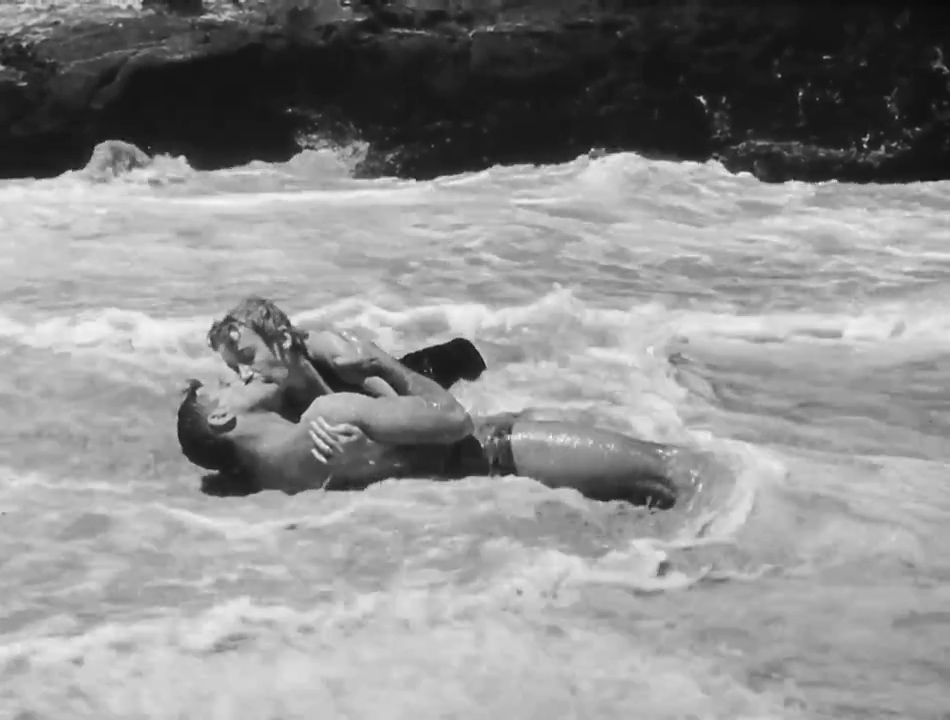
Kerr with Burt Lancaster in the iconic scene of From Here to Eternity (1953)

Kerr departed from typecasting with a performance that brought out her sensuality, as Karen Holmes, the embittered American military wife in Fred Zinnemann's From Here to Eternity (1953), for which she received an Oscar nomination for Best Actress. The American Film Institute acknowledged the iconic status of the scene from that film in which she and Burt Lancaster romped illicitly and passionately amidst crashing waves on a Hawaiian beach. The organisation ranked it 20th in its list of the 100 most romantic films of all time.

Having established herself as a film actress in the meantime, she made her Broadway debut in 1953, appearing in Robert Anderson's Tea and Sympathy, for which she received a Tony Award nomination. Kerr performed the same role in Vincente Minnelli's film adaptation released in 1956; her stage partner John Kerr (no relation) also appeared. In 1955, Kerr won the Sarah Siddons Award for her performance in Chicago during a national tour of the play. After her Broadway début in 1953, she toured the United States with Tea and Sympathy.

=== Peak years of stardom ===
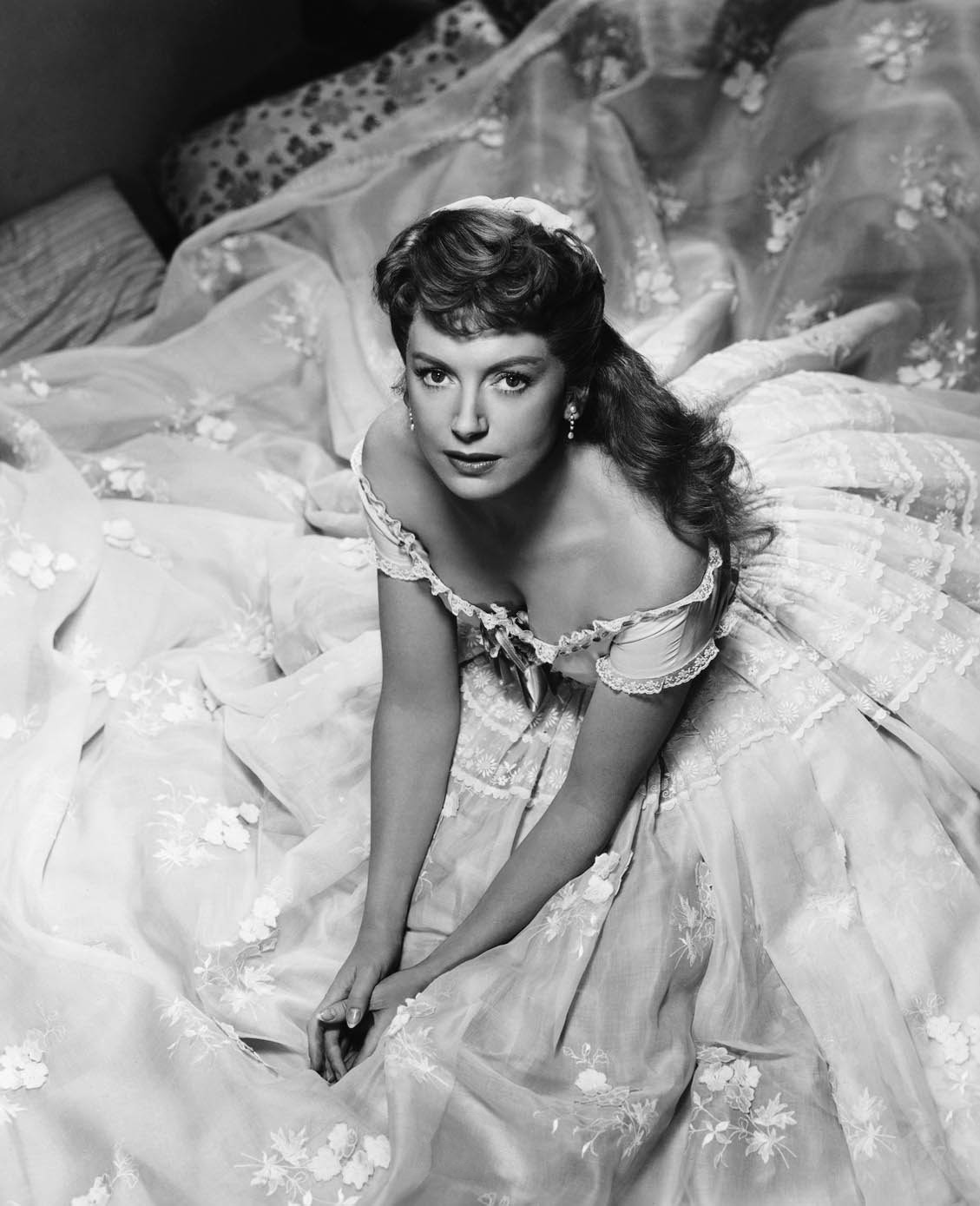
Kerr in The King and I (1956)

Thereafter, Kerr's career choices would make her known in Hollywood for her versatility as an actress. She played the repressed wife in The End of the Affair (1955), shot in England with Van Johnson. She was a widow in love with William Holden in The Proud and Profane (1956), directed by George Seaton. Neither film was much of a hit. However Kerr then played Anna Leonowens in the film version of the Rodgers and Hammerstein musical The King and I (1956), with Yul Brynner in the lead; it was a huge hit. Marni Nixon dubbed Kerr's singing voice.

She played a nun in Heaven Knows, Mr. Allison (1957) opposite her long-time friend Robert Mitchum, directed by John Huston. It was very popular as was An Affair to Remember (1957) opposite Cary Grant.

Kerr starred in four films with David Niven: Bonjour Tristesse (1958), directed by Otto Preminger, Separate Tables (1958), directed by Delbert Mann, which was particularly well received, Eye of the Devil (1966), directed by J. Lee Thompson and Prudence and the Pill (1968), directed by Fielder Cook.

She made two films at MGM: The Journey (1959) reunited her with Brynner; Count Your Blessings (1959), was a comedy. Both flopped, as did Beloved Infidel (1959) with Gregory Peck.

== Later films ==
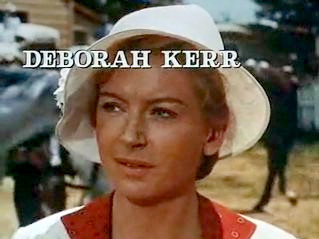
Kerr in The Sundowners (1960)

Kerr was reunited with Mitchum in The Sundowners (1960) shot in Australia, then The Grass Is Greener (1960), co-starring Cary Grant. She appeared in Gary Cooper's last film The Naked Edge (1961) and starred in The Innocents (1961) where she plays a governess tormented by apparitions.

Kerr made her British TV debut in "Three Roads to Rome" (1963). She was another governess in The Chalk Garden (1964) and worked with John Huston again in The Night of the Iguana (1964).

She joined Dean Martin and Frank Sinatra in a love triangle for a romantic comedy, Marriage on the Rocks (1965).

In 1965, the producers of Carry On Screaming! offered her a fee comparable to that paid to the rest of the cast combined, but she turned it down in favour of appearing in an aborted stage version of Flowers for Algernon. She replaced Kim Novak in Eye of the Devil (1966) with Niven, and was reteamed with Niven in the comedy Casino Royale (1967), achieving the distinction of being, at 45, the oldest "Bond girl" in any James Bond film, until Monica Bellucci, at the age of 50, in Spectre (2015). Casino Royale was a hit as was another movie she made with Niven, Prudence and the Pill (1968). She also made The Gypsy Moths (1969), reuniting her with Burt Lancaster, and The Arrangement (1969) with Kirk Douglas and Elia Kazan, her director from the stage production of Tea and Sympathy.

She appeared in one more film, The Assam Garden (1985).

== Theatre ==
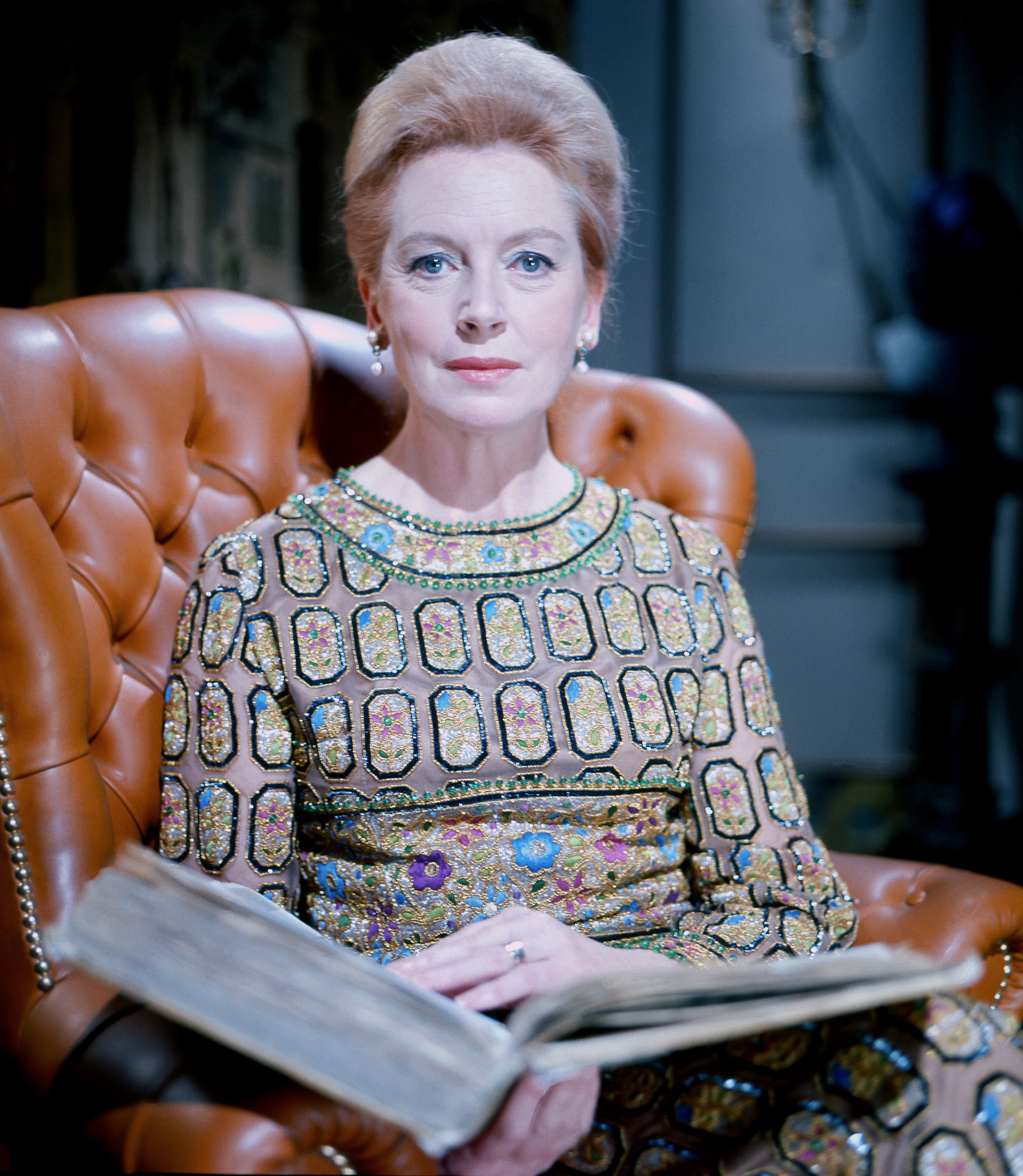
Kerr in 1973, by Allan Warren

Concern about parts offered her made her abandon film at the end of the 1960s, with one exception in 1985, in favour of television and theatre work.

Kerr returned to the London stage in many productions, including the old-fashioned, The Day After the Fair (Lyric, 1972), a Peter Ustinov comedy, Overheard (Haymarket, 1981) and a revival of Emlyn Williams's The Corn is Green. After her first London success in 1943, she toured England and Scotland in Heartbreak House.

In 1975, she returned to Broadway, creating the role of Nancy in Edward Albee's Pulitzer Prize-winning play Seascape.

In 1977, she came back to the West End, playing the title role in a production of George Bernard Shaw's Candida.

The theatre, despite her success in films, was always to remain Kerr's first love, even though going on stage filled her with trepidation:

I do it because it's exactly like dressing up for the grown ups. I don't mean to belittle acting but I'm like a child when I'm out there performing—shocking the grownups, enchanting them, making them laugh or cry. It's an unbelievable terror, a kind of masochistic madness. The older you get, the easier it should be but it isn't.

== Television ==
Kerr experienced a career resurgence on television in the early 1980s when she played the role of the nurse (played by Elsa Lanchester in the 1957 film of the same name) in Witness for the Prosecution, with Sir Ralph Richardson. She also did A Song at Twilight (1982).

She took on the role of the older Emma Harte, a tycoon, in the adaptation of Barbara Taylor Bradford's A Woman of Substance (1985). For this performance, Kerr was nominated for an Emmy Award.

Kerr rejoined old screen partner Mitchum in Reunion at Fairborough (1985). Other TV roles included Ann and Debbie (1986) and Hold the Dream (1986), the latter a sequel to A Woman of Substance.

== Personal life ==
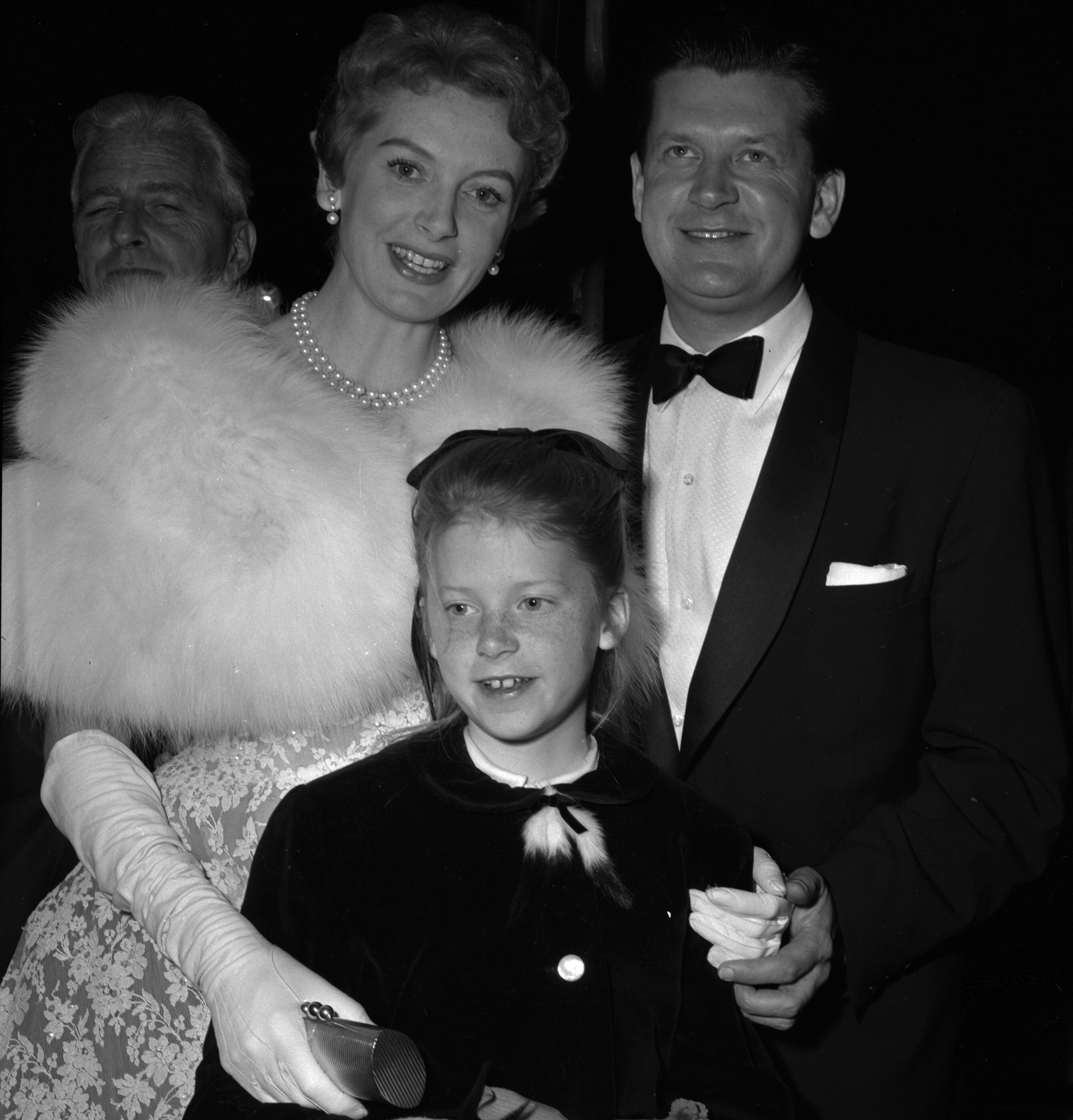
Kerr with her daughter Melanie and her first husband Tony Bartley at the premiere of Heaven Knows, Mr. Allison (1957)

Kerr's first marriage was to Squadron Leader Anthony Bartley, DFC and Bar, RAFVR on 29 November 1945. They had two daughters, Melanie Jane (born 27 December 1947) and Francesca Ann (born 18 December 1951, who married the actor John Shrapnel). Through Francesca they had three grandsons, actors Lex Shrapnel and Tom Shrapnel as well as the writer Joe Shrapnel. Melanie is a medical sociologist and retired academic. The marriage was troubled, owing to Bartley's envy of his wife's fame and financial success, and because her career often took her away from home. They divorced in 1959.

Her second marriage was to author Peter Viertel on 23 July 1960. In marrying Viertel, she became stepmother to Viertel's daughter, Christine Viertel. Although she long resided in Klosters, Switzerland, and Marbella, Spain, Kerr moved back to Britain to be closer to her own children as her health began to deteriorate. Her husband, however, continued to live in Marbella.

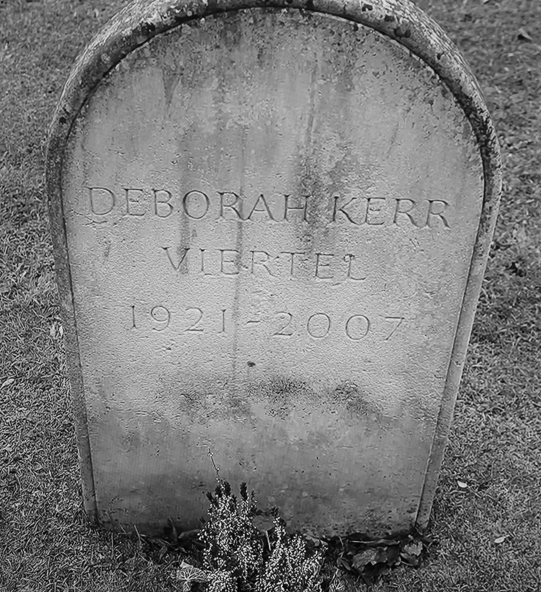
The grave of Kerr, Alfold churchyard in Surrey

Stewart Granger said in his autobiography that in 1945 she had approached him romantically in the back of his chauffeur-driven car at the time he was making Caesar and Cleopatra. Although he was married to Elspeth March, he states that he and Kerr went on to have an affair. When asked about this revelation, Kerr's response was, "What a gallant man he is!"

=== Death ===
Kerr died aged 86 on 16 October 2007 at Botesdale, a village in the county of Suffolk, England, from the effects of Parkinson's disease.

Within three weeks of her death, her husband Peter Viertel died of cancer on 4 November. At the time of Viertel's death, director Michael Scheingraber was filming the documentary Peter Viertel: Between the Lines, which includes reminiscences concerning Kerr and the Academy Awards.

== Filmography ==
=== Film ===
Year	Title	Role	Director	Notes
1940	Contraband	Cigarette Girl	Michael Powell	Scenes deleted
1941	Major Barbara	Jenny Hill	Gabriel Pascal	
1941	Love on the Dole	Sally Hardcastle	John Baxter	Nomination — New York Film Critics Circle Award for Best Actress; Alternative Title — Love in misery
1942	Penn of Pennsylvania	Gulielma Maria Springett	Lance Comfort	
1942	Hatter's Castle	Mary Brodie	Lance Comfort	
1942	The Day Will Dawn	Kari Alstad	Harold French	US title — The Avengers
1942	A Battle for a Bottle	Linda (voice)		Animated short
1943	The Life and Death of Colonel Blimp	Edith Hunter; Barbara Wynne; Johnny Cannon	Powell and Pressburger	Nomination — New York Film Critics Circle Award for Best Actress
1945	Perfect Strangers	Catherine Wilson	Alexander Korda	US title — Vacation from Marriage
1946	I See a Dark Stranger	Bridie Quilty	Frank Launder	New York Film Critics Circle Award for Best Actress
1947	Black Narcissus	Sister Clodagh	Powell and Pressburger	New York Film Critics Circle Award for Best Actress
1947	The Hucksters	Kay Dorrance	Jack Conway	
1947	If Winter Comes	Nona Tybar	Victor Saville	
1949	Edward, My Son	Evelyn Boult	George Cukor	Nomination — Academy Award for Best Actress; Nomination — Golden Globe Award for Best Actress in a Motion Picture – Drama
1950	Please Believe Me	Alison Kirbe	Norman Taurog	
1950	King Solomon's Mines	Elizabeth Curtis	Compton Bennett; Andrew Marton	
1951	Quo Vadis	Lygia	Mervyn LeRoy	
1952	Thunder in the East	Joan Willoughby	Charles Vidor	
1952	The Prisoner of Zenda	Princess Flavia	Richard Thorpe	
1953	Julius Caesar	Portia	Joseph L. Mankiewicz	
1953	Young Bess	Catherine Parr	George Sidney	
1953	Dream Wife	Effie	Sidney Sheldon	
1953	From Here to Eternity	Karen Holmes	Fred Zinnemann	Nomination — Academy Award for Best Actress
1955	The End of the Affair	Sarah Miles	Edward Dmytryk	Nomination — BAFTA Award for Best Actress in a Leading Role
1956	The Proud and Profane	Lee Ashley	George Seaton	
1956	The King and I	Anna Leonowens	Walter Lang	Golden Globe Award for Best Actress – Motion Picture Comedy or Musical; Nomination — Academy Award for Best Actress; Nomination — New York Film Critics Circle Award for Best Actress; Singing dubbed by Marni Nixon
1956	Tea and Sympathy	Laura Reynolds	Vincent Minnelli	Nomination — New York Film Critics Circle Award for Best Actress; Nomination — BAFTA Award for Best Actress in a Leading Role
1957	Heaven Knows, Mr. Allison	Sister Angela	John Huston	New York Film Critics Circle Award for Best Actress; Nomination — Academy Award for Best Actress; Nomination — Golden Globe Award for Best Actress in a Motion Picture – Drama
1957	An Affair to Remember	Terry McKay	Leo McCarey	Singing dubbed by Marni Nixon
1958	Bonjour Tristesse	Anne Larson	Otto Preminger	
1958	Separate Tables	Sibyl Railton-Bell	Delbert Mann	Nomination — Academy Award for Best Actress; Nomination — Golden Globe Award for Best Actress in a Motion Picture – Drama
1959	The Journey	Diana Ashmore	Anatole Litvak	
1959	Count Your Blessings	Grace Allingham	Jean Negulesco	
1959	Beloved Infidel	Sheilah Graham	Henry King	
1960	The Sundowners	Ida Carmody	Fred Zinnemann	New York Film Critics Circle Award for Best Actress; Nomination — Academy Award for Best Actress; Nomination — BAFTA Award for Best Actress in a Leading Role
1960	The Grass Is Greener	Lady Hilary Rhyall	Stanley Donen	
1961	The Naked Edge	Martha Radcliffe	Michael Anderson	
1961	The Innocents	Miss Giddens	Jack Clayton	
1964	The Chalk Garden	Miss Madrigal	Ronald Neame	Nomination — BAFTA Award for Best Actress in a Leading Role
1964	The Night of the Iguana	Hannah Jelkes	John Huston	
1965	Marriage on the Rocks	Valerie Edwards	John Donohue	
1966	Eye of the Devil	Catherine de Montfaucon	J. Lee Thompson	
1967	Casino Royale	Agent Mimi/Lady Fiona McTarry	John Huston; Val Guest	
1968	Prudence and the Pill	Prudence Hardcastle	Fielder Cook	
1969	The Gypsy Moths	Elizabeth Brandon	John Frankenheimer	
1969	The Arrangement	Florence Anderson	Elia Kazan	
1985	The Assam Garden	Helen Graham	Mary McMurray	Final film role

=== Television ===
Year	Title	Role	Notes
1963	ITV Play of the Week	Moira	Episode: Three Roads to Rome
1982	BBC2 Playhouse	Carlotta Gray	Episode: A Song at Twilight
1982	Witness for the Prosecution	Nurse Plimsoll	Television movie
1985	A Woman of Substance	Emma Harte	Miniseries
1985	Reunion at Fairborough	Sally Wells Grant	Television movie
1986	Ann and Debbie	Ann	Television movie
1986	Hold the Dream	Emma Harte	Miniseries

=== Theatre ===
Year	Title	Role	Venue
1943	Heartbreak House	Ellie Dunn	Cambridge Theatre, London
1953	Tea and Sympathy	Laura Reynolds	Ethel Barrymore Theatre, New York City
1972	The Day After the Fair	Edith	Lyric Theatre, London
1973–1974	The Day After the Fair	Edith	North American tour
1975	Seascape	Nancy	Shubert Theatre, New York City
1977	Long Day's Journey into Night	Mary Tyrone	Ahmanson Theatre, Los Angeles
1977	Candida	Candida	Albery Theatre, London
1978	The Last of Mrs. Cheyney	Mrs. Cheyney	Eisenhower Theatre, Kennedy Center, Washington DC
1981	Overheard		Theatre Royal Haymarket, London
1985	The Corn is Green	Miss Moffat	The Old Vic, London

=== Radio ===
A 1949 adaptation of Jane Eyre for NBC University Theatre, starring Kerr

Year	Program	Episode/Source
1944	A Date with Nurse Dugdale	BBC Home Service, 19 May 1944. Guest star role in the penultimate episode.
1949	NBC University Theatre	Jane Eyre, 3 April 1949.
1952	Lux Radio Theatre	King Solomon's Mines
1952	Hallmark Playhouse	The Pleasant Lea
1952	Hollywood Sound Stage	Michael and Mary
1952	Suspense	The Colonel's Lady
1952	Hollywood Star Playhouse	Companion Wanted

== Awards and nominations ==
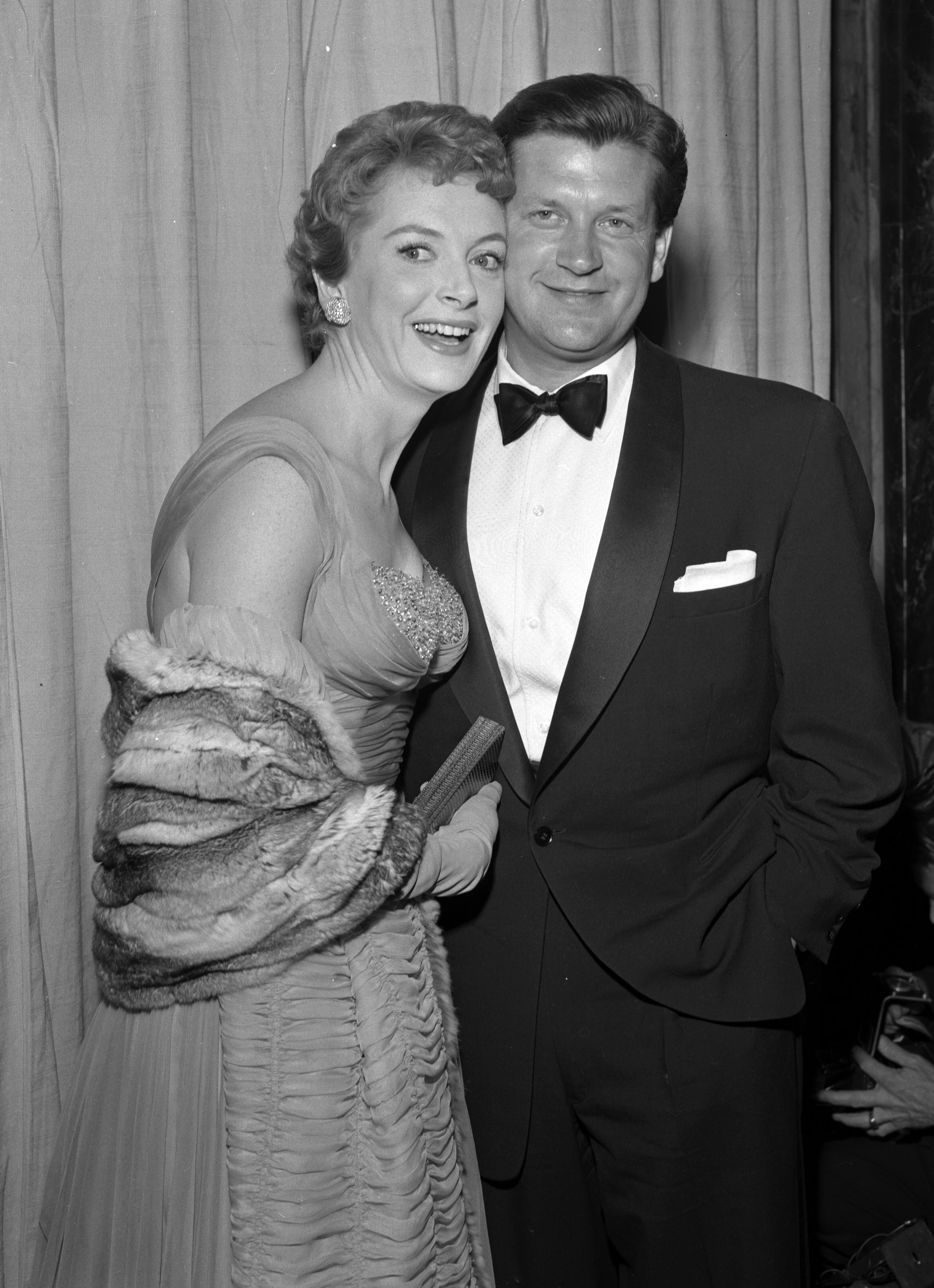
Kerr at the 1957 Academy Awards, where she received the third of her six Best Actress Oscar nominations

=== Academy Awards ===
1950	Best Actress	Edward, My Son	Nominated
1954	Best Actress	From Here to Eternity	Nominated
1957	Best Actress	The King and I	Nominated
1958	Best Actress	Heaven Knows, Mr. Allison	Nominated
1959	Best Actress	Separate Tables	Nominated
1961	Best Actress	The Sundowners	Nominated
1994	Honorary Oscar	–	Won

She is tied with Thelma Ritter and Amy Adams as the actresses with the second most nominations without winning, surpassed only by Glenn Close, who has been nominated eight times without winning, except that all of Deborah's 6 nominations were for Best Actress for which she holds the record, never having won. Glenn Close's nominations were split with 4 nominations apiece for lead and supporting nominations.

=== British Academy Film Awards ===
Year	Category	Work	Result
1956	Best British Actress	The End of the Affair	Nominated
1958	Best British Actress	Tea and Sympathy	Nominated
1962	Best British Actress	The Sundowners	Nominated
1965	Best British Actress	The Chalk Garden	Nominated
1991	Special Award	–	Won

=== Primetime Emmy Awards ===
Year	Category	Work	Result
1985	Outstanding Supporting Actress - Limited Series	A Woman of Substance	Nominated

=== Golden Globe Awards ===
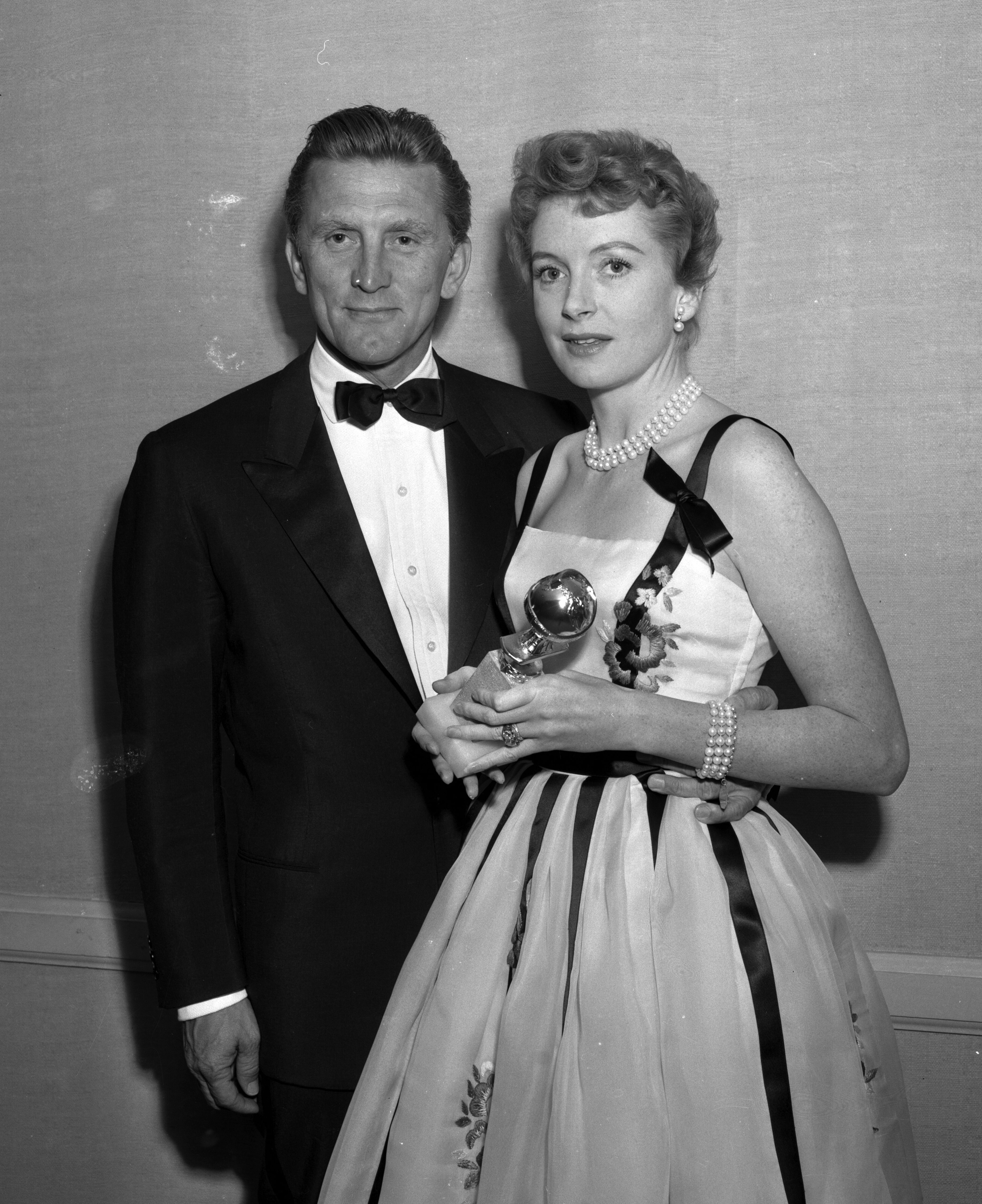
Best actress winner Kerr, alongside the best actor winner Kirk Douglas at the 14th Golden Globe Awards in 1957

1950	Best Actress – Motion Picture Drama	Edward, My Son	Nominated
1957	Best Actress – Motion Picture Musical or Comedy	The King and I	Won
1958	Best Actress – Motion Picture Drama	Heaven Knows, Mr. Allison	Nominated
1959	Best Actress – Motion Picture Drama	Separate Tables	Nominated
1959	Henrietta Award (World Film Favorite)	–	Won

=== NYFCC Awards ===
Year	Category	Work	Result
1946	Best Actress	The Life and Death of Colonel Blimp, Love on the Dole	Nominated
1947	Best Actress	Black Narcissus, I See a Dark Stranger	Won
1956	Best Actress	The King and I, Tea and Sympathy	Nominated
1957	Best Actress	Heaven Knows, Mr. Allison	Won
1960	Best Actress	The Sundowners	Won

== Honours ==
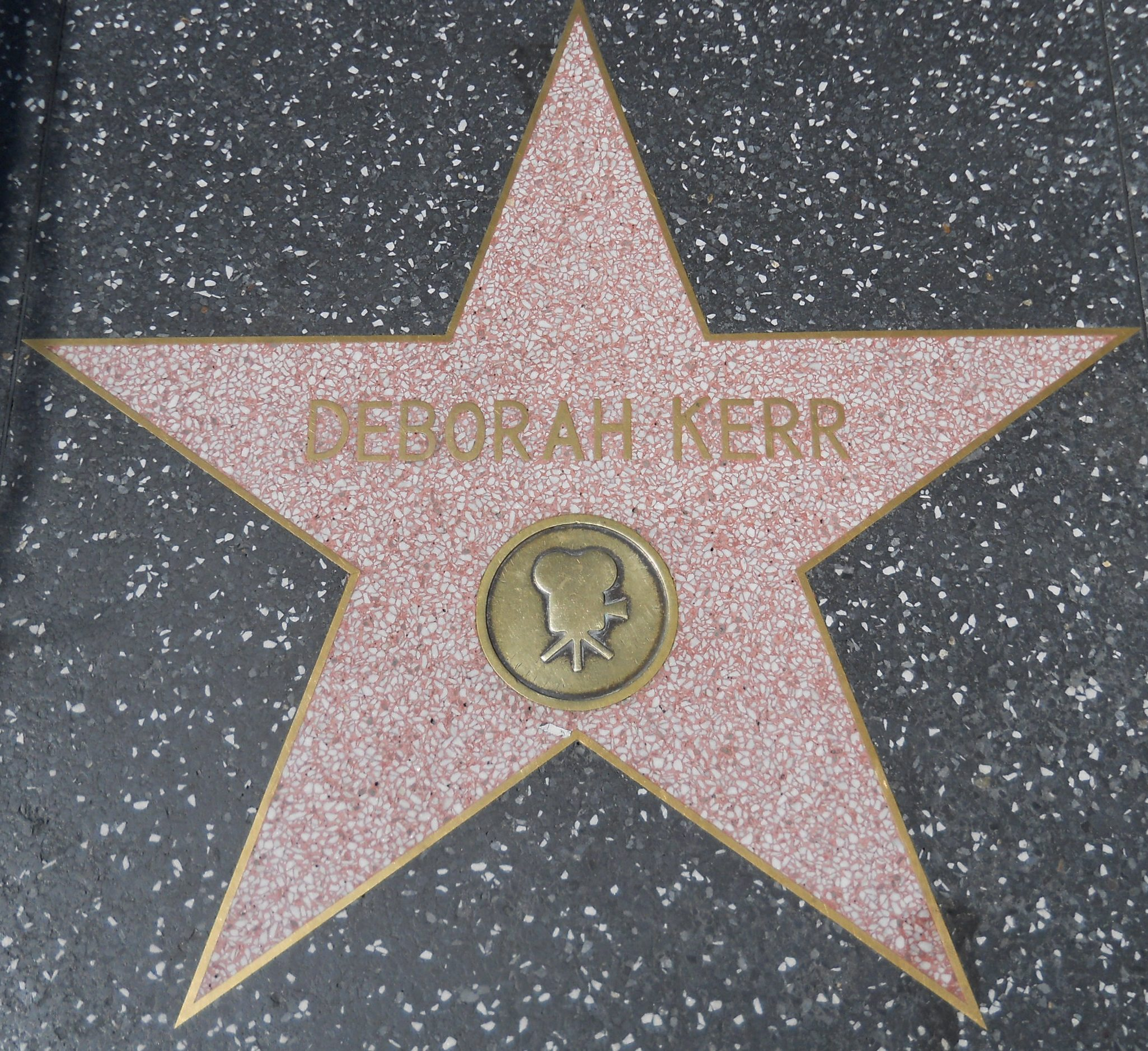
Kerr's star on the Hollywood Walk of Fame at 1709 Vine Street

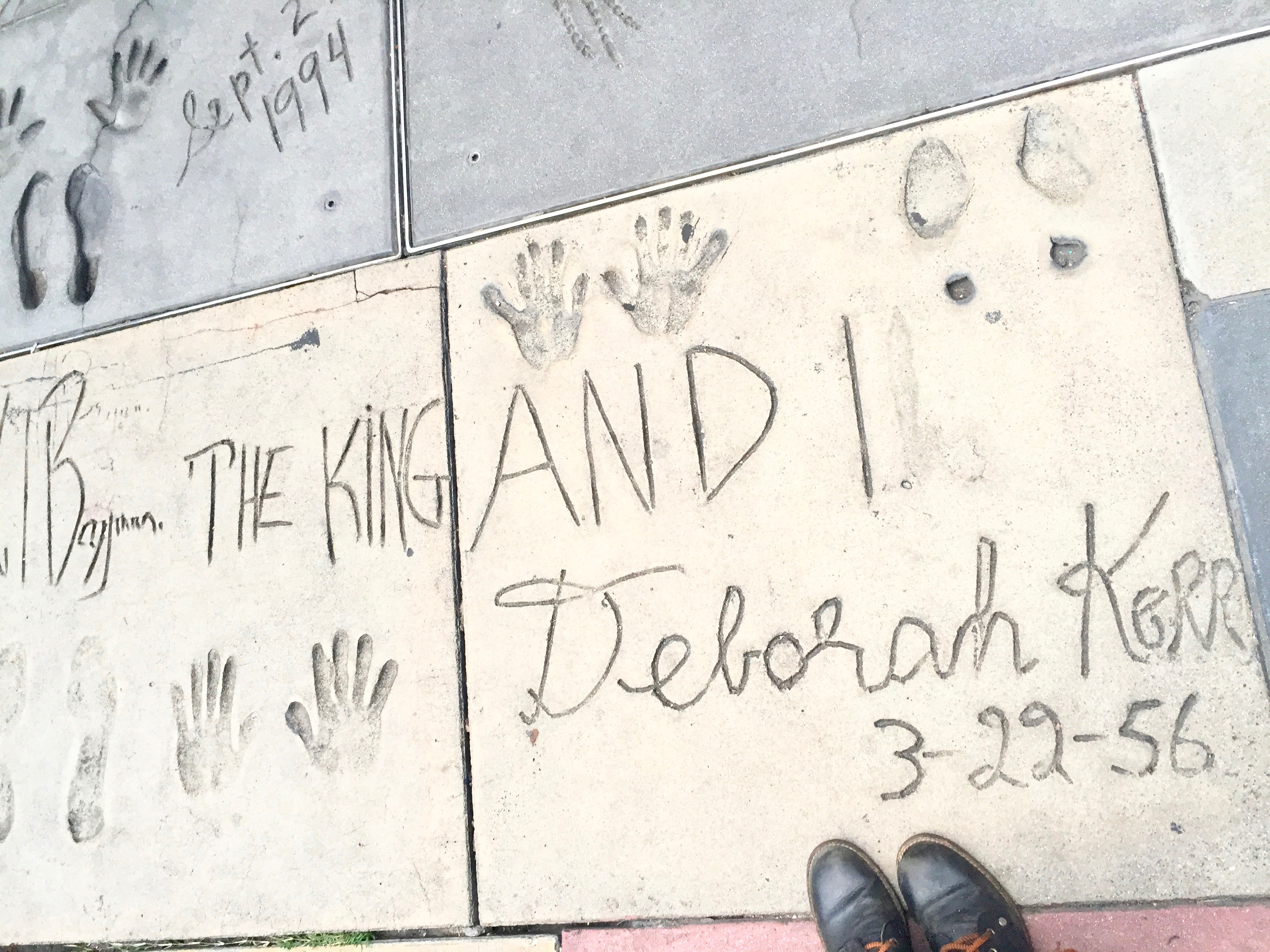
Kerr's signature, handprints and footprints in the concrete in front of Grauman's Chinese Theatre in Los Angeles.

Kerr was made a Commander of the Order of the British Empire (CBE) in 1998, but was unable to accept the honour in person because of ill health. She was also honoured in Hollywood, where she received a star on the Hollywood Walk of Fame at 1709 Vine Street for her contributions to the motion picture industry.

Although nominated six times as Best Actress, Kerr never won a competitive Oscar. In 1994, Glenn Close presented Kerr with the Honorary Oscar for lifetime achievement with a citation recognising her as "an artist of impeccable grace and beauty, a dedicated actress whose motion picture career has always stood for perfection, discipline and elegance".

Kerr won a Golden Globe Award for "Best Actress – Motion Picture Musical or Comedy" for The King and I in 1957 and a Henrietta Award for "World Film Favorite – Female". She was the first performer to win the New York Film Critics Circle Award for "Best Actress" three times (1947, 1957 and 1960).

Although she never won a BAFTA or Cannes Film Festival award in a competitive category, both organisations gave Kerr honorary awards: a Cannes Film Festival Tribute in 1984 and a BAFTA Special Award in 1991.

In September and October 2010, Josephine Botting of the British Film Institute curated the "Deborah Kerr Season", which included around twenty of her feature films and an exhibition of posters, memorabilia and personal items loaned by her family.

In September 2021, Kerr's grandsons, Joe and Lex Shrapnel, unveiled a memorial plaque at the former family home in Weston-super-Mare.

On 30 September 2021, on what would have been Kerr's one hundredth birthday, the Lord Provost of Glasgow, Philip Braat, unveiled a memorial plaque in Ruskin Terrace, on the site of the nursing home where Kerr was born.

== See also ==
- Patricia Bartley

== Bibliography ==
- Braun, Eric. Deborah Kerr. St. Martin's Press, 1978. ISBN 0-312-18895-1.
- Capua, Michelangelo. Deborah Kerr. A Biography. McFarland, 2010. ISBN 978-0-7864-5882-0.
- Street, Sarah. Deborah Kerr. British Film Institute, 2018. ISBN 978-1844576753.
- Powell, Michael. A Life in Movies. Heinemann, 1986. ISBN 0-434-59945-X.
- Andrew, Penelope. "Deborah Kerr: An Actress in Search of an Author". Bright Lights Film Journal, May 2011, Issue #72. Deborah Kerr: An Actress in Search of an Author, (c) Penelope Andrew, 2011.
