= Patricia Bartley =

British codebreaker (1917–2021)

Patricia Marjorie Bartley, Mrs Brown (1 May 1917, Dacca, British India – 26 February 2021, Ely, Cambridgeshire) was a British codebreaker at Bletchley Park, and a member of British intelligence's diplomatic office in Mayfair, London. Among her contributions to the war effort was the breaking of the German diplomatic Floradora code, a task partially accomplished by a team she led.

== Early life ==
Bartley was the eldest of four children of Sir Charles Bartley, a judge and a secretary to the government of Bengal, and Marjorie Hamilton. She was sent at age 10 to a boarding school in England, where she was unhappy. When her mother and siblings moved to France, she joined them in Saint-Jacut-de-la-Mer. She became fluent in German and French. The family then settled in Buckinghamshire.

In 1936, she started at Lady Margaret Hall, Oxford to read philosophy, politics and economics. Suffering from illness, she quit two years later. At the outbreak of war she was recruited by the notable cryptanalyst Emily Anderson, who was billeted on her family. Her brother, Tony, joined the Royal Air Force, later becoming an ace pilot and the first husband of Deborah Kerr, who was for a while her flatmate in London.

== Career ==
She worked first on Italian military and naval cyphers, when she was credited with spotting that one Italian operator had mistakenly sent the encryption keys for the next month's traffic instead of the message intended. In the summer of 1941 she was told to work on the German Diplomatic Cypher, known to the British as "Floradora", which was believed to be uncrackable. She started on her own, working in Nigel de Grey's office.

By the autumn, the team had expanded to four people and moved to the Diplomatic Section in Elmers School. By the spring of 1942, a photo taken at Wavendon School shows 12 people in the section. That spring, the Diplomatic Section moved to new quarters in Berkeley Street in London as part of the reorganisation of Government Code and Cypher School which replaced Commander Alastair Denniston with Edward Travis; Denniston moved with the Diplomatic section to London and Travis took over at Bletchley Park.

The team was in possession of the German diplomatic codebook of 100,000 figure groups. Copies had been seized from the German Consulate in Iceland in 1940; another copy is believed to have been stolen from the luggage of a German spy passing through the Panama Canal, and a third was recovered from the Far East in mysterious circumstances.

The difficulty lay in the encipherment of these code books, using a table 10,000 lines long, which gave 25,000,000 different possibilities for enciphering each code group. To make matters even more complicated, the encyphering process did not use single lines from the table, but two different lines combined, and the two lines used changed every two days. This system had been introduced by the Germans after World War 1, following the successful British decyption of the Zimmermann Telegram. It was reckoned to be impossible to crack and in fact the British had given up collecting traffic to analyse before 1939.

Bartley's intellectual contribution was to realise that the second 5,000 lines of the cypher table were the reciprocal of the first 5,000. This made it easier to use the table, and also easier to break into it. Nigel de Grey had reached the same insight independently.

The British were also in possession of the first fifty lines of the cypher table, which had been captured from the German consulate in Reykjavík before it could be entirely burned. This, coupled with the laziness of the cypher clerk at the German embassy in Buenos Aires, who always used lines from the page that the British had in their possession, meant that the first (trivial) decrypts were produced in August 1942, 14 months at least after she had started work.

By this time there were 36 people working for her in the German diplomatic section, among them Dorothy Hyson, an American film actress, and Ernst Fetterlein, who had been Tsar Nicholas II's top cryptographer until the 1917 revolution, then defected to the British.

Despite these early successes against the traffic from Buenos Aires, further success depended on huge computational resources. It was the Americans, with their banks of IBM/Hollerith punch card machines, who finally reconstructed the complete cypher table, a task completed on 15 February 1943

Bartley was responsible for liaising on intelligence matters with the Americans, who were often happier to collaborate with her than with others at British intelligence. They were grateful for her insights into the Floradora code as well as her spotting of mistakes made by the Germans.

An American intelligence officer, William F. Friedman, wrote in his diary that Bartley had accidentally discovered the reciprocal nature of the German adder book, which was then proven by another member at Bletchley Park, De Grey.

In the summer of 1943 she suffered a breakdown from overwork, and her place as head of the German Diplomatic Section was taken over by the former liaison officer with Bletchley Park, William Filby, who later claimed to have been in charge of the section from its inception. After the war, she rejoined GC&CS, where she wrote two official internal histories of the work she had been involved in, and chapters in several others though these are still covered by the Official Secrets Act. In 1951, rather than join the GCHQ exodus to Cheltenham, she transferred to the public part of the Foreign Office, (as an intelligence operative she had been listed as "Foreign Office" since 1940) in the anti-communist propaganda section called Information Research Department. During this time, she met Denys Brown, whom she married in 1954.

== Later life ==
She accompanied her husband to the Suez Canal when he was posted there as a diplomat. During the Israeli invasion of the canal in 1956, they were forced to flee. Denys Brown was later posted to Yugoslavia, Sweden and West Germany. Bartley found that the diplomatic wife's role was a full-time one, disconnecting her from her own intellectual pursuits. However, she did newspaper reviews of codebreaking-related books.

The Browns had two children, Andrew, a writer, and Iona. After Denys Brown retired, he and Bartley lived in Godalming, Surrey. Brown died in 1997. Bartley moved to Saffron Walden then to Ely. She died on 26 February 2021, aged 103.

== See also ==
- Tony Bartley
- Bletchley Park
