= Anthony Bartley =

Anthony Bartley may refer to:

- Tony Bartley (1919–2001), British film and television executive
- Tony Bartley (footballer) (1938–2024), English footballer, see List of Oldham Athletic A.F.C. players (25–99 appearances)
