= Dorothy Hyson =

American actress (1914–1996)

Dorothy Hyson, Lady Quayle
- Hyson in The Ghoul (1933)
- Born: Dorothy Wardell Heisen; December 24, 1914; Chicago, Illinois, U.S.
- Died: May 23, 1996 (aged 81); London, England
- Occupation: Stage actress
- Spouses: Robert Douglas (m. 1935; div. 1945) Sir Anthony Quayle (m. 1947; died 1989)
- Children: 3
- Parents: Carl Constantine Hyson (father); Dorothy Dickson (mother)

Dorothy Hyson, Lady Quayle (born Dorothy Wardell Heisen; December 24, 1914 – May 23, 1996) was an American-born film and stage actress who worked largely in England. During World War II, she worked as a cryptographer at Bletchley Park.

== Early life ==
She was the only child of actress Dorothy Dickson and matinée idol Carl Constantine Hyson (né Heisen). Her mother was known for being the Toast of Broadway. Hyson made her acting debut at age three, playing her mother's daughter in a silent film shot by director George Fitzmaurice at New York's Paramount studios. Hyson moved to England with her parents who eventually divorced. Her mother had a successful run in Jerome Kern's musical Sally and became the highest-paid actress in London. Hyson was schooled in England and France, but "Little Dot", as she was nicknamed, made several West End appearances in children's roles including J.M. Barrie's Quality Street. After seeing her, aged 13, in the theatrical adaptation of Daisy Ashford's The Young Visiters, Sybil Thorndike told her mother, "She's going to be a star."

== Career ==
After finishing school in Paris, Hyson appeared in Soldiers of the King with Cicely Courtneidge at age 19. Her professional theatrical debut was in Ivor Novello's play Flies in the Sun. She worked on films during the daytime and appeared on stage at night. Filming at Blackpool with Gracie Fields Sing As We Go and acting in the West End in Dodie Smith's Touch Wood led to a nervous breakdown. She continued to be in light West End comedies and had a big hit in an adaptation of Jane Austen's Pride and Prejudice in 1936. In 1938 she appeared as Titania in Tyrone Guthrie's Old Vic revival of A Midsummer Night's Dream.

During the Second World War, Hyson made several more films including You Will Remember with Robert Morley and the musical comedy Spare a Copper with George Formby. She also acted in revue, musical comedy and plays like the thriller Pink String and Sealing Wax in 1943 and an adaptation from Trollope Scandal at Barchester in 1944. In 1945 she played Lady Windermere in Oscar Wilde's Lady Windermere's Fan.

She worked at the secret codebreaking establishment Bletchley Park during World War II, She was part of a team of twelve led by Patricia Bartley who broke the German diplomatic code, Floradora.

Although married to Robert Douglas, she was visited at Bletchley Park by Anthony Quayle, who became her second husband. Quayle recalled that: "She had gone to work as a cryptographer at Bletchley Park. I went to see her there and found her ill and exhausted with the long night shifts."

She was a "byword for theatrical West End glamour" and after the war returned to the West End, joining John Gielgud’s Haymarket Company in 1945.

She was married twice—to actor Robert Douglas (1935–45) and then actor and director Sir Anthony Quayle (1947–89, his death). After marrying Quayle in 1947 she soon retired from the stage to concentrate on bringing up their three children.

== Death ==
She was widowed in 1989 and died from a stroke on May 23, 1996, aged 81, in Britain, a year after the death of her mother, who died at age 102.

It is not known whether she or her mother ever relinquished their United States citizenship or became British citizens.

== Filmography ==
- Money Mad (aka Paying the Piper, 1918)
- The Ghoul (Betty Harlon) (1933)
- Soldiers of the King (Judy Marvello) (1933)
- Turkey Time (Rose Adair) (1933)
- Happy (Lillian) (1933)
- That's a Good Girl (Moya Malone) (1934)
- Sing As We Go (Phyllis) (1934)
- A Cup of Kindness (Betty Ramsbotham)(1934)
- Now You're Talking (Mrs. Hamton) (1940)
- Spare a Copper (Jane Gray) (1941)
- You Will Remember (Ellaline Terriss) (1941)
- Salute to Show Business (1957) (Participant)

== Stage ==
- Quality Street - 1927
- The Young Visitor - 1928
- Flies in the Sun - 1932
- Saturday's Children - 1933
- That's a Good Girl - 1933
- Turkey Time (with Tom Walls & Ralph Lynn) - 1933
- Touch Wood (with Flora Robson) - 1934
- The Ringmaster (with Laurence Olivier) 1934
- Most of the Game - 1935
- Pride and Prejudice (with Celia Johnson) - 1936
- A Midsummer Night's Dream - 1939
- Pink String and Sealing Wax - 1945
- Scandal at Barchester - 1944
- Lady Windermere's Fan - 1944
