= I See a Dark Stranger =

1946 British film by Frank Launder

- theatrical poster (US)
- Directed by: Frank Launder
- Written by: Sidney Gilliat; Frank Launder (story & screenplay); Wolfgang Wilhelm; Liam Redmond (add'l dialogue)
- Produced by: Sidney Gilliat; Frank Launder
- Starring: Deborah Kerr; Trevor Howard
- Cinematography: Wilkie Cooper
- Edited by: Thelma Connell
- Music by: William Alwyn
- Production company: Individual Pictures
- Distributed by: General Film Distributors (UK); Eagle-Lion Films (U.S.)
- Release dates: 4 July 1946 (UK); 3 April 1947 (U.S.)
- Running time: 112 minutes (UK); 98 minutes (U.S.)
- Country: United Kingdom
- Language: English

I See a Dark Stranger (U.S. title: The Adventuress) is a 1946 British World War II spy comedy film directed by Frank Launder and starring Deborah Kerr and Trevor Howard.

== Plot ==
Ireland, 1937. Young Bridie Quilty has grown up listening to her father's heroic tales of the Irish Revolution. As a result, she develops a hatred for everything and everyone British, especially "the wicked murdering blackguard" Oliver Cromwell. By 1944, Mr. Quilty has died. Bridie, who is now 21, sets out for Dublin to carve a life of her own, hoping to join the IRA. On the train, she shares a compartment with J. Miller, a businessman returned from abroad. He is also a German agent who's entered Ireland unencumbered thanks to lax security. He shortly gets his assignment—to break a fellow spy out of prison.

Miller recruits Bridie, who gets a job at a hotel and bar in Wynbridge Vale. Soon she becomes acquainted with a certain sergeant, who unwittingly provides her information about the prisoner's impending transfer to London. Meanwhile, Miller is disturbed by the arrival of Lieutenant David Baynes, a British naval officer on leave researching a thesis on Cromwell he suspects of being a counter-intelligence agent. To help enable Miller to free the spy he tells Bridie to distract Baynes on the day of the transfer. The implication is clear, she is to use her wiles. Baynes is happy to take her into the country on her half day but is curious by her blowing hot and cold with him. It turns out that he has nothing to do with the prisoner transfer.

The spy is freed anyway but is later shot in the getaway. Before dying, he tells Miller to recover a notebook on the Isle of Man that holds important information. Miller is wounded too, but he escapes. When Bridie returns to her room, he is there, dying. He gives her the location of the notebook to pass up the spy chain. Keeping his head to the last, he tells her to dispose of his body when he is dead, which she does.

When her German agent contact is picked up, Bridie heads to Liverpool to get way to Ireland. She is followed by David and a mysterious stranger. However, travel to Ireland has been suspended so she sets out herself for the Isle of Man; with British military intelligence patching the clues together and only a step behind. Successfully locating the notebook at the Tynwald, she deciphers it, learning the location of the imminent D-Day landings. She decides to burn it. David later narrowly saves Bridie from being arrested as Miller's confederate, and after confessing his love for her, she tells him what she has done.

Bridie tries to turn herself in, but the trailing German agents kidnap her. David tracks them and ends up abducted too. When she refuses to tell what she knows, the two are taken to Ireland on a fishing smack. The Nazis try to hide them amid a funeral procession, but the "mourners" are actually smugglers entering Northern Ireland. Things go wrong at the border crossing, a melee erupts, and then Bridie and David escape in the confusion. Believing that they are still in neutral Ireland, where Bridie would be merely interned, David calls the police from a pub. When he discovers that they are actually in Northern Ireland, and that Bridie could be shot as a spy, he tries to persuade her to flee across the border. But she insists on facing the consequences. A BBC broadcast then announces D-Day has begun, rendering what she knows useless to the Germans. David helps her escape, then discovers the pack of spies in a room upstairs. A fight breaks out, the police arrive, and arrest all. After the war Bridie and David wed, their troubles seemingly all behind them, but staying at an inn called 'The Cromwell Arms' on their honeymoon is too much for her to stand.

== Cast ==
- Deborah Kerr as Bridie Quilty
- Trevor Howard as Lieutenant David Baynes
- Raymond Huntley as J. Miller
- Michael Howard as Hawkins
- Norman Shelley as Man in Straw Hat
- Brenda Bruce as Barmaid
- Brefni O'Rorke as Michael O'Callaghan
- James Harcourt as Grandfather
- Liam Redmond as Uncle Timothy
- W. O'Gorman as Danny Quilty
- Garry Marsh as Captain Goodhusband
- Tom Macaulay as Lieutenant Spanswick
- Tony Quinn as Guide
- Olga Lindo as Mrs. Edwards
- John Salew as Man in the Bookshop
- Harry Hutchinson as Chief Mourner/Smuggler
- David Ward as Oscar Pryce
- George Woodbridge as Walter
- Everley Gregg as 1st Woman on Train
- Kathleen Boutall as 2nd Woman on Train
- Harry Webster as Uncle Joe
- Kathleen Murphy as 1st Irish Woman
- Josephine Fitzgerald as 2nd Irish Woman
- Eddie Golden as Terence Delaney
- Marie Ault as Mrs. O'Mara
- Frank Atkinson as Soldier in Pub
- Frank Ling as Reggie, Soldier in Pub
- Peter Jones as Soldier in Pub
- Lyn Evans as Soldier in Pub
- Humphrey Heathcote as Sergeant Harris
- Kenneth Buckley as R.T.O.
- David Tomlinson as Intelligence Officer
- Peter Cotes as Young Man (billed as Peter Coates)
- Torin Thatcher as Policeman
- Leslie Dwyer as Soldier in Cafe
- Katie Johnson as Old Lady
- Desmond Roberts as Naval Officer on Train
- Hugh Dempster as Train Passenger
- Pat Leonard as Receptionist
- Gerald Case as Colonel Dennington
- Dorothy Bramhall as A. T. S. Corporal
- Cameron Hall as Usher in Tynwald Court
- Joan Hickson as Hotel Manageress
- Doreen Percheron as Receptionist
- Norman Pierce as Dance M. C.
- Eddie Byrne as Irish Sailor
- Jim Winters as Irish Policeman
- Austin Meldon as Customs Officer
- Albert Sharpe as Irish Landlord
- Bob Elson as Policeman

== Production ==
Frank Launder and Sidney Gilliat, writers who had worked on Alfred Hitchcock's 1938 spy film The Lady Vanishes, formed Individual Pictures in 1945. I See a Dark Stranger was the first of ten films released by the company, with Launder kicking off an intended rotation between the pair as director.

The picture was filmed at various locations, including Dublin, Dundalk and around Wexford in Ireland, Dunster in England, and the Isle of Man.

During production, a rumour spread among crew members that a close relationship had developed between the "handsome, young" cinematographer Wilkie Cooper and Deborah Kerr. If it went beyond that, the affair was short-lived, as Kerr married Spitfire pilot Tony Bartley almost immediately after the film's completion.

Charters and Caldicott, characters Launder and Gilliat first introduced in The Lady Vanishes (1938), were set to appear in the film but due to a disagreement with the actors Basil Radford and Naunton Wayne they were replaced by Captain Goodhusband and Lieutenant Spanswick.

== Reception ==
The film was released in the United States under the title The Adventuress, to good reviews but modest box office. Bosley Crowther, the critic for The New York Times called the film "keenly sensitive and shrewd."

In 1990 Sidney Gilliat quipped the film "must have broken even now."

== Awards and honours ==
Deborah Kerr won a 1947 New York Film Critics Circle Award for Best Actress for her performances in Black Narcissus and I See a Dark Stranger.
