= Lex Shrapnel =

British actor

- Born: Alexander Carey Shrapnel; 6 October 1979 (age 47); London, England
- Occupation: Actor
- Years active: 1997–present
- Parent(s): John Shrapnel; Francesca Ann Bartley
- Relatives: Norman Shrapnel (grandfather); Tony Bartley (grandfather); Deborah Kerr (grandmother)

Alexander Carey Shrapnel (born 6 October 1979) is an English actor.

== Early life ==
Shrapnel was born on 6 October 1979 in London, the second of three boys for actor John Shrapnel and Francesca Ann (née Bartley). He is the brother of director/writer Tom Shrapnel and writer Joe Shrapnel and, through his mother, the grandson of Academy Award-nominated actress Deborah Kerr. He graduated from the Guildhall School of Music & Drama.

== Career ==
He has appeared in many film and television roles such as K-19: The Widowmaker, Nine Lives, Thunderbirds, Breakfast on Pluto, Flyboys, Ministry of Mayhem and The Last Detective. He also appeared in the Doctor Who audio play, Shadow of the Past.

Shrapnel's Hotspur in Henry IV in the Royal Shakespeare Company's critically acclaimed 2008 production was described as "thrillingly charismatic". He also has appeared on stage in 2011 in Terence Rattigan's The Deep Blue Sea performed at the West Yorkshire Playhouse. He is quoted as saying: "Before going in you set a high bar for yourself, but you've just got to get into rehearsals, do the work and hope it comes together".

== Filmography ==
=== Film ===
Year	Title	Role	Notes
2002	K-19: The Widowmaker	Kornilov	
2002	Nine Lives	Tom	
2004	Thunderbirds	John Tracy	
2005	Breakfast on Pluto	Soldier at Roadblock	
2006	Minotaur	Tyro	
2006	Flyboys	Grant	
2007	The Tonto Woman	Springfield	
2009	An Organisation of Dreams	Lex	
2011	Captain America: The First Avenger	Gilmore Hodge	
2014	SEAL Team 8: Behind Enemy Lines	Case	
2018	Hamlet Revenant		
2018	Extinction	Ray	

=== Television ===
Year	Title	Role	Notes
2004	Ministry of Mayhem	Himself	
2005	Beneath the Skin	Fred	
2006	Sharpe's Challenge	Captain Lawrence	
2007	The Last Detective	Young Billy	1st episode
2009	Minder	Jamie Cartwright	6 episodes
2012	Hunted	Ian Fowkes	
2013	Endeavour	Roy Adamson	Episode: "Fugue"
2013	Casualty	Mark Caffola	Episode: "Garage Flowers"
2013	By Any Means	DI Campbell	Episode #1.2
2014	The Assets	Mitch Weaver	
2016	Medici: Masters of Florence	Rinaldo degli Albizzi	
2022	Infiniti	Anthony Kurz	Main cast
2023	A Town Called Malice	Leonard Lord	Main cast
2024	The Bay	David Wallasey	Series 5
2025–present	Father Brown	Father Vincent Lazarus	Recurring cast
2025	Lazarus	Billy McIntyre	Recurring cast
2026	Red Eye	SSG O'Hanlon	5 episodes of Series 2
