= Touch Wood =

Theatrical play by Dodie Smith

Touch Wood is a play by the British writer Dodie Smith. It ran for 213 performances during its initial run at the Haymarket Theatre between May and November 1934. A drama about a love triangle, the original cast included Ian Hunter, Dorothy Hyson, Desmond Tester, Flora Robson, Frank Pettingell and Marie Ney. It was produced by the theatrical impresario Basil Dean.

The play received enthusiastic reviews in The Spectator and The Times. The latter acclaimed it as Smith's best play and hailed it for converting "Ibsen into popular terms".

== Bibliography ==
- Wearing, J.P. The London Stage 1930-1939: A Calendar of Productions, Performers, and Personnel. Rowman & Littlefield, 2014.
