= Happy (1933 film) =

1933 film

- Directed by: Frederic Zelnik
- Written by: Austin Melford, Stanley Lupino, Frank Launder, Jaques Bachrach, Alfred Halm and Károly Nóti (Adaptation, Dialogue and Scenario)
- Produced by: Frederic Zelnik
- Starring: Stanley Lupino; Will Fyffe; Laddie Cliff; Renee Gadd; Dorothy Hyson
- Production company: British International Pictures
- Distributed by: Wardour Films
- Release date: 11 December 1933
- Running time: 76 minutes
- Country: United Kingdom
- Language: English

Happy is a 1933 British musical film directed by Frederic Zelnik, starring Stanley Lupino, Dorothy Hyson, Laddie Cliff, and Will Fyffe.

== Plot ==
Frank, a band leader and inventor, is smitten with the daughter of a millionaire in Paris. His friend, a pianist and composer falls in love with a cafe owner. Together they try to sell a device to stop car thefts in order to escape their penury and get married.

== Cast ==
- Stanley Lupino as Frank Brown
- Laddie Cliff as George
- Will Fyffe as Simmy
- Dorothy Hyson as Lillian
- Harry Tate as Dupont
- Renee Gadd as Pauline
- Gus McNaughton as Waller
- Jimmy Godden as Brummelberg
- Bertha Belmore as Mrs. Brummelberg
- Hal Gordon as Conjuror
- Norma Varden as Miss Stone, Secretary with Glasses

== Songs ==
Happy features the following songs:

- Happy and There's So Much I'm Wanting To Tell You by Stanley Lupino and Noel Gay
- There Was A Poor Musician and Will You Dance Through Life With Me, plus the musical score by Kurt Schwabach, Fred Raymond, Will Meisel, Ralph Stanley, Willy Rosen, Henrik N. Ege and Fred Schwarz.

== Critical response ==
In a New York Times review Hal Erickson said "Too expensive for a 'quota quickie' but not quite costly enough to qualify as an 'A' picture, Happy is a shapeless but generally satisfying vehicle for several of England's top music-hall attractions."
