= Melanie Bartley =

Medical sociologist

- Born: Melanie Jane Bartley; 27 December 1947 (age 78)
- Occupation: Professor Emeritus at University College London
- Known for: Research in the concepts and measures of social inequality and the theoretical basis for health inequality
- Notable work: Author of "Health Inequality: An Introduction"
- Parents: Tony Bartley (father); Deborah Kerr (mother)

Melanie Jane Bartley FBA (born 27 December 1947) is a medical sociologist and retired academic. She was Professor of Medical Sociology at University College London from 2001 to 2012.

== Career and research ==
Bartley completed her undergraduate studies in sociology and philosophy at the University of Reading. After several years of research, she completed a master of science degree in medical sociology at Bedford College, London, and worked outside of academia for a number of years, including time as a research assistant at the British Regional Heart Study. She then completed a doctorate at the University of Edinburgh under the supervision of Adrian Sinfield; her PhD was awarded in 1988 for her thesis "Unemployment and health 1975–1987: a case study in the relationship between research and policy debate". She eventually took up a position at University College London in 1996; she was appointed to a personal chair in medical sociology in 2001; she retired in 2012 but remains at UCL as an emeritus professor as of 2018.

According to her British Academy profile, Bartley specialises in "unemployment, social inequality, gender and other social determinants of health over the life course". In a book review for the International Journal of Epidemiology, Mary Shaw described Bartley as one of the "key researchers, who is an intellectual force, in the field of health inequalities ... [she] has played a distinguished role in this field for a number of years".

== Awards and honours ==
In 2015, Bartley was elected a Fellow of the British Academy (FBA), the United Kingdom's national academy for the humanities and social sciences.

== Selected publications ==
- Authorities and Partisans: The Debate on Unemployment and Health (Edinburgh University Press, 1992).
- Health Inequality: An Introduction to Concepts, Theories and Methods (Polity Press, 2003).
- Work, Non-Work, Job Satisfaction and Psychological Health: Evidence Review (Health Development Agency, 2005).

== Personal life ==
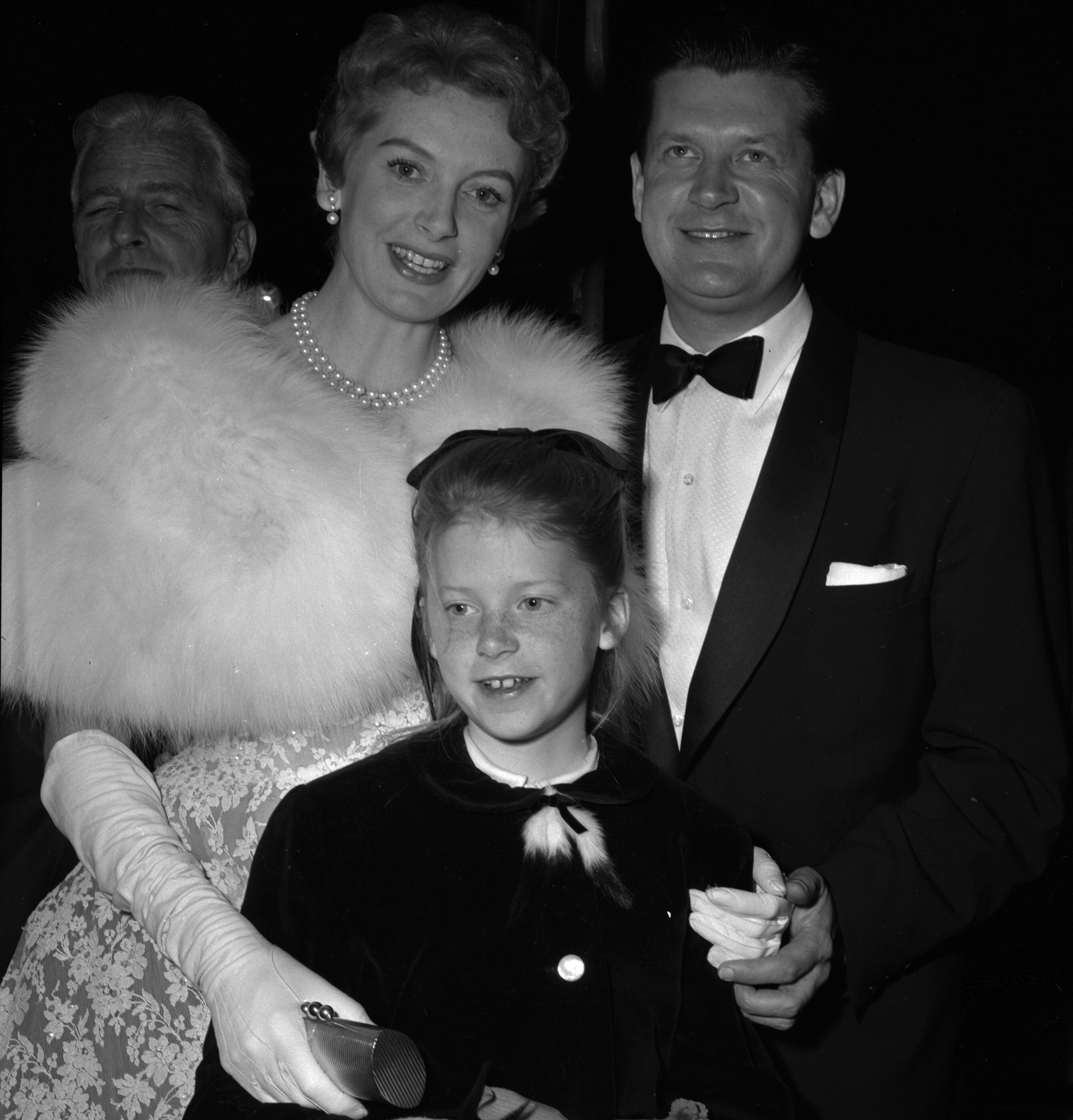
Bartley (aged 9) with her parents at the movie premiere of Heaven Knows, Mr. Allison, starring her mother in 1957

Bartley is the daughter of actress Deborah Kerr and film and television executive, and ace RAF fighter pilot, Tony Bartley.
