= Andrew Brown (writer) =

English journalist, writer, and editor

- Born: 1955 (age 70–71); London, England
- Occupations: Writer; journalist; editor; broadcaster
- Writing career
- Language: English
- Notable work: Fishing in Utopia
- Notable awards: Orwell Prize
- Website: thewormbook.com/elegans/hlog

Andrew Brown (born 1955 in London) is an English journalist, writer, and editor. He was one of the founding staff members of The Independent, where he worked as a religious correspondent, parliamentary sketch writer, and a feature writer. He has written extensively on technology for Prospect and the New Statesman and been a feature writer on The Guardian. He worked as the editor for the Belief section of The Guardian's Comment is Free, which won a Webby under his leadership, and later became a leader writer and member of the paper's editorial board. He left the paper oin 2019. He is also the press columnist of the Church Times. In The Beginning was the Worm (2004) was shortlisted for the Aventis Prize. Fishing in Utopia (2008) won the Orwell Prize and was nominated for the Dolman Best Travel Book Award in 2009.

Brown is the son of Bletchley Park codebreaker Patricia Bartley.

== Views ==
=== Christianity and non-believers ===
Brown has described himself as someone for whom "Christianity is only true backwards." He has written that he is "constantly astonished by the way in which the Church of England contains such a large number of clever, learned and dedicated people giving their lives to an institution that is none of those things." He has also concluded, "But I still can't do it myself. So why worry? Why not see it all as nonsense? Because really it isn't all nonsense. As a friend of mine, a former missionary, said once: 'It's about the thing that is true even if Christianity isn't true. Christian language does things that no other use of language can. I can conclude only that God has called me to be an atheist.'"

Brown has criticised Richard Dawkins for what he calls the cult of personality that has grown around him and his positions. He is also sceptical of the scientific concept of memes, as developed by Dawkins.

=== The Guardian editorial on David Cameron ===
In September 2019, Private Eye magazine named Brown as the author of an editorial in The Guardian newspaper about former British prime minister David Cameron. This touched on the death of Cameron's six-year-old son. Brown claimed the PM only ever felt "privileged pain". The article provoked outrage across the political spectrum, and the paper later said the piece "fell far short of our standards. It has now been amended, and we apologise completely."

=== Torture ===
Brown has been a fierce critic of the Sam Harris' position on torture. He has attacked Harris for what he has described as Harris' advocacy of torture in situations where we are willing to accept collateral damage (i.e., from bombing, etc.), as it relates to fighting the war on terror.

=== English Wikipedia ===
Brown fears English Wikipedia has outcompeted rival encyclopedias and problems that lead to criticism of Wikipedia will continue. Brown fears "charlatans and liars" have the most to gain from editing Wikipedia, and potential idealistic contributors are discouraged, due to difficulties editing the site, especially through smartphones.

== Bibliography ==
- Watching the Detectives (1989)
- The Darwin Wars (2000)
- In The Beginning was the Worm (2004)
- Fishing in Utopia (2008)
- That Was The Church That Was (with Professor Linda Woodhead) (2016)

== Awards and nominations ==
- 1994 John Templeton European Religion Writer of the Year
- 2004 Aventis Prize for In The Beginning was the Worm, nominated
- 2009 Dolman Best Travel Book Award for Fishing in Utopia, nominated
- 2009 Orwell Prize for Fishing in Utopia, won
