= Ernst Fetterlein =

Ernst Constantin Fetterlein (3 April 1873 – June 1944) was a Russian cryptographer who later defected to Britain.

Fetterlein was born in St Petersburg, the son of Karl Fedorovich Fetterlein, a German-language tutor, and Olga Fetterlein, née Meier. He studied a variety of eastern languages at the University of St Petersburg, graduating in 1894. On 25 November 1896 he joined the Ministry of Foreign Affairs. He eventually became the chief cryptologist for the Tsar of Russia, holding the rank of "General-Admiral," an honorary title in Tsarist Russia. During World War I, he was known for a time as Ernst Popov as his German-derived name could have drawn unwanted attention. Amongst others, he solved German, Austrian and British codes.

Upon the Russian Revolution of 1917, he fled to Western Europe with his wife on board a Swedish ship, narrowly evading capture. He contacted the British and French intelligence organisations, offering to work for whoever would pay him the most, which was apparently the British, as he was recruited to Room 40 in June 1918 to work on Georgian, Austrian and Bolshevik codes. After the end of World War I, he worked for the successor to Room 40, the Government Code and Cypher School (GC&CS), becoming a senior assistant on 17 December 1919. During this time he worked on Soviet Communist traffic. He was thought well of by his colleagues, one of whom wrote, "He was a brilliant cryptographer. On book cipher and anything else where insight was vital he was quite the best. He was a fine linguist and would usually get an answer no matter the language." He retired in 1938. His brother, P. K. Fetterlein, also worked for GC&CS.

Fetterlein came out of retirement during World War II to assist GC&CS's diplomatic section at Berkeley Street. He worked on "Floradora", a German diplomatic code.
