= 1962 New York Film Critics Circle Awards =

28th New York Film Critics Circle Awards

28th New York Film Critics Circle Awards

No Awards because of newspaper strike which started December 8, 1962

The 28th New York Film Critics Circle Awards, cancelled due to the 114-day 1962 New York City newspaper strike, which started on December 8, 1962.
