= 1947 New York Film Critics Circle Awards =

13th New York Film Critics Circle Awards

13th New York Film Critics Circle Awards

January 19, 1948
(announced December 28, 1947)

Gentleman's Agreement

The 13th New York Film Critics Circle Awards, announced on 19 January 1948, honored the best filmmaking of 1947.

== Winners ==
- Best Film:
  - Gentleman's Agreement
- Best Actor:
  - William Powell - Life with Father and The Senator Was Indiscreet
- Best Actress:
  - Deborah Kerr - Black Narcissus and The Adventuress
- Best Director:
  - Elia Kazan - Gentleman's Agreement
- Best Foreign Language Film:
  - To Live in Peace (Vivere in pace) • Italy
