= Tony Bartley =

British flying ace (1919–2001)

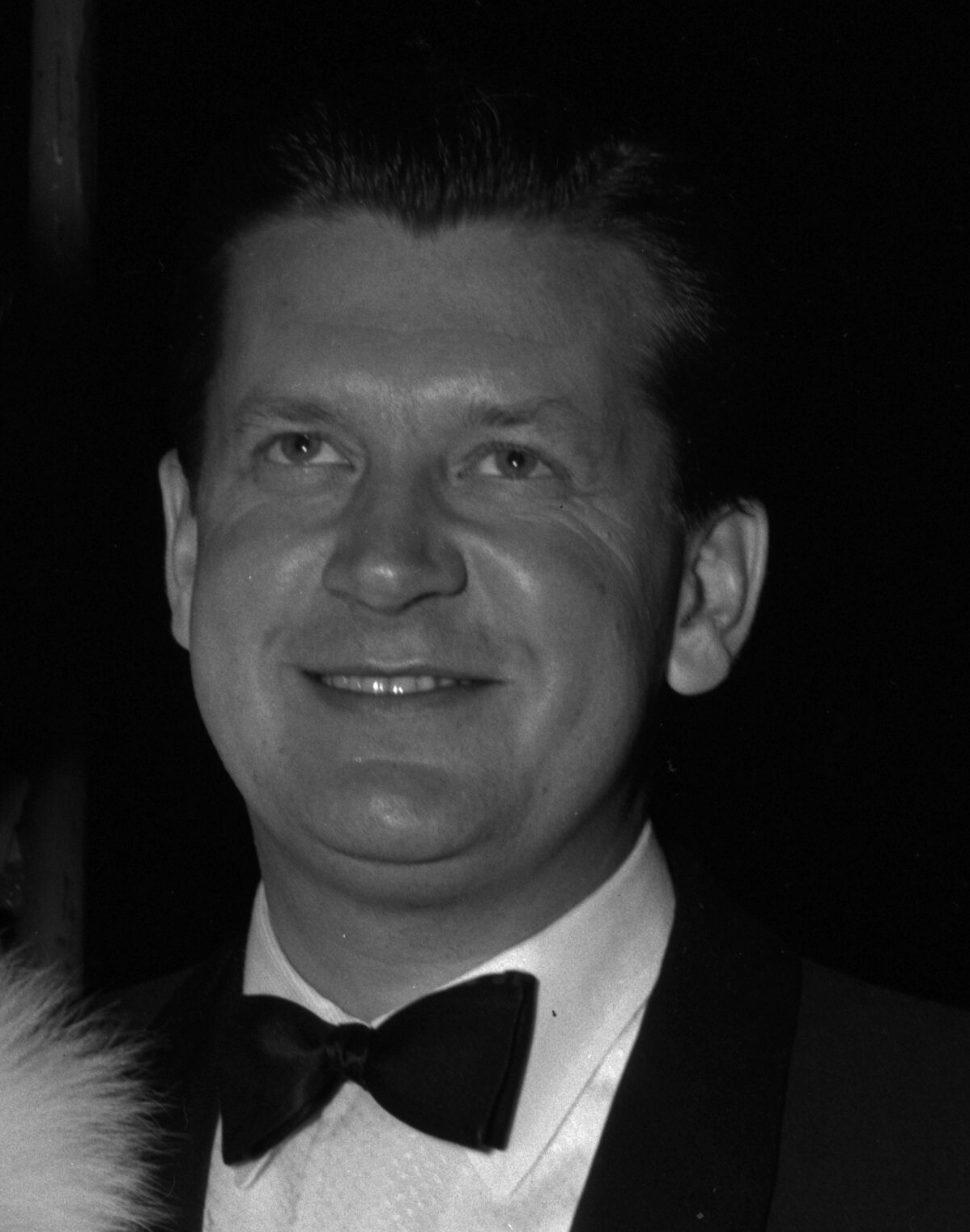
- Bartley in 1957
- Born: Anthony Charles Bartley; 28 March 1919; Dacca, British India
- Died: 18 April 2001 (aged 82)
- Spouses: Deborah Kerr (m. 1945; div. 1959) Victoria Mann (m. 1965)
- Children: 4 (including Melanie Bartley)
- Relatives: Lex Shrapnel (grandson)
- Military career
- Allegiance: United Kingdom
- Branch: Royal Air Force
- Service years: 1939–1946
- Rank: Squadron Leader
- Units: No. 92 Squadron RAF; No. 74 Squadron RAF
- Commands: No. 111 Squadron RAF
- Conflicts: Second World War: Battle of France; Battle of Britain; North African campaign
- Awards: Distinguished Flying Cross & Bar
- Other work: Test pilot, television and film executive, and author

Anthony Charles Bartley, DFC & Bar (28 March 1919 – 18 April 2001) was a British film and television executive, and fighter pilot. As a Royal Air Force (RAF) Spitfire pilot, Bartley was awarded the Distinguished Flying Cross for his actions during the Battle of Britain, during which he became a fighter ace.

== Early life ==
Bartley was born in Dacca, India, on 28 March 1919, the son of an Irish barrister, Sir Charles Bartley, a Calcutta High Court judge.

Bartley attended Stowe School, a boarding independent school for boys in the civil parish of Stowe, in Buckinghamshire.

== RAF career ==
In 1938, Bartley learned to fly. He was commissioned as an acting pilot officer in the Royal Air Force on 18 April 1939; this rank was made permanent, albeit on probation, on 21 October 1939. He flew with No. 92 Squadron through the Battle of France, seeing action over Dunkirk and during the Battle of Britain and was awarded the Distinguished Flying Cross (DFC) in October 1940, by which time he had been credited with shooting down "at least eight enemy aircraft".

After serving in No. 74 Squadron in early 1941, Bartley became an instructor at several operational training units before transferring to Vickers Supermarine as a test pilot at in July 1941. In early 1942, he returned to operational flying, being posted No. 65 Squadron as a flight commander but took command of the squadron in May 1942. In August 1942, he took command of No. 111 Squadron, and led them during Operation Torch, in North Africa, until January 1943. For his service in North Africa, he received a bar to his DFC in February 1943.

After returning to the United Kingdom, he served on the staff of No. 83 Group RAF, before departing in October 1944 for the US to attend the Command and General Staff College, and then at the School of Air Tactics. His next posting was as a liaison officer to the 70th Fighter Wing. In October 1944 he joined RAF Transport Command in the Far East. At the end of the war Bartley's combat total included 12 (and 1 shared) destroyed, 1 unconfirmed destroyed, 5 'probables' and 8 'damaged'.

== Film industry ==
Following his demobilisation in 1946, Bartley returned to Vickers-Armstrong, where he worked as both a sales executive and a test pilot. He had married the actress Deborah Kerr in November 1945, and later moved with her to Hollywood. The couple had met in Brussels in March 1945, when she was performing, with Stewart Grainger, in a production of Gaslight for the troops. His post-war work in the film industry included roles in the United States, Canada, Barbados and Ireland, and included the establishment of several companies, writing and producing films for television, work in sales and production and executive roles.

== Personal life ==
Bartley and Kerr had two daughters, Francesca and Melanie. Through Francesca they have three grandsons, actors Lex Shrapnel and Tom Shrapnel as well as the writer Joe Shrapnel. Melanie is a medical sociologist and retired academic. Bartley and Kerr divorced in 1959 and he married again in 1965 to Victoria Mann. Bartley died in 2001. He was survived by Mann and their two daughters, Cindy and Teresa, as well as by Francesa and Melanie. Mann died in 2019. On 19 November 2021, it was announced that the seven medals Bartley received for his wartime service would be auctioned by Dix Noonan Webb in London in December 2021.

== Bibliography ==
- Bartley, Anthony. (1984). Smoke Trails in the Sky. William Kimber. ISBN 978-0-7183-0517-8
- Bartley, Tony. (1997). Smoke Trails in the Sky: The Journals of a Battle of Britain Fighter Pilot. Crecy Publishing Ltd; 2nd edition. ISBN 978-0-947554-63-7

== See also ==
- Patricia Bartley
