= 1957 New York Film Critics Circle Awards =

23rd New York Film Critics Circle Awards

23rd NYFCC Awards

unknown
(announced December 30, 1957)

Best Film:
The Bridge
on the River Kwai

The 23rd New York Film Critics Circle Awards honored the best filmmaking of 1957.

== Winners ==
- Best Film:
  - The Bridge on the River Kwai
- Best Actor:
  - Alec Guinness – The Bridge on the River Kwai
- Best Actress:
  - Deborah Kerr – Heaven Knows, Mr. Allison
- Best Director:
  - David Lean – The Bridge on the River Kwai
- Best Foreign Language Film:
  - Gervaise • France
