= Floradora =

WW2 German doubly enciphered diplomatic code

"Floradora", also called Keyword, was a doubly enciphered diplomatic code used by the Germans during the Second World War. The Allies used tabulating equipment, created by IBM, to break the code over a period of more than a year in 1941 and 1942.
