= 1946 New York Film Critics Circle Awards =

12th New York Film Critics Circle Awards

12th New York Film Critics Circle Awards

January 9, 1947
(announced December 30, 1946)

The Best Years of Our Lives

The 12th New York Film Critics Circle Awards, announced on 9 January 1947, honored the best filmmaking of 1946.

== Winners ==
- Best Film:
  - The Best Years of Our Lives
- Best Actor:
  - Laurence Olivier - Henry V
- Best Actress:
  - Celia Johnson - Brief Encounter
- Best Director:
  - William Wyler - The Best Years of Our Lives
- Best Foreign Language Film:
  - Open City (Roma, città aperta) • Italy
