= 1956 New York Film Critics Circle Awards =

22nd New York Film Critics Circle Awards

22nd New York Film Critics Circle Awards

January 19, 1957
(announced December 27, 1956)

Around the
World in Eighty Days

The 22nd New York Film Critics Circle Awards, honored the best filmmaking of 1956.

== Winners ==
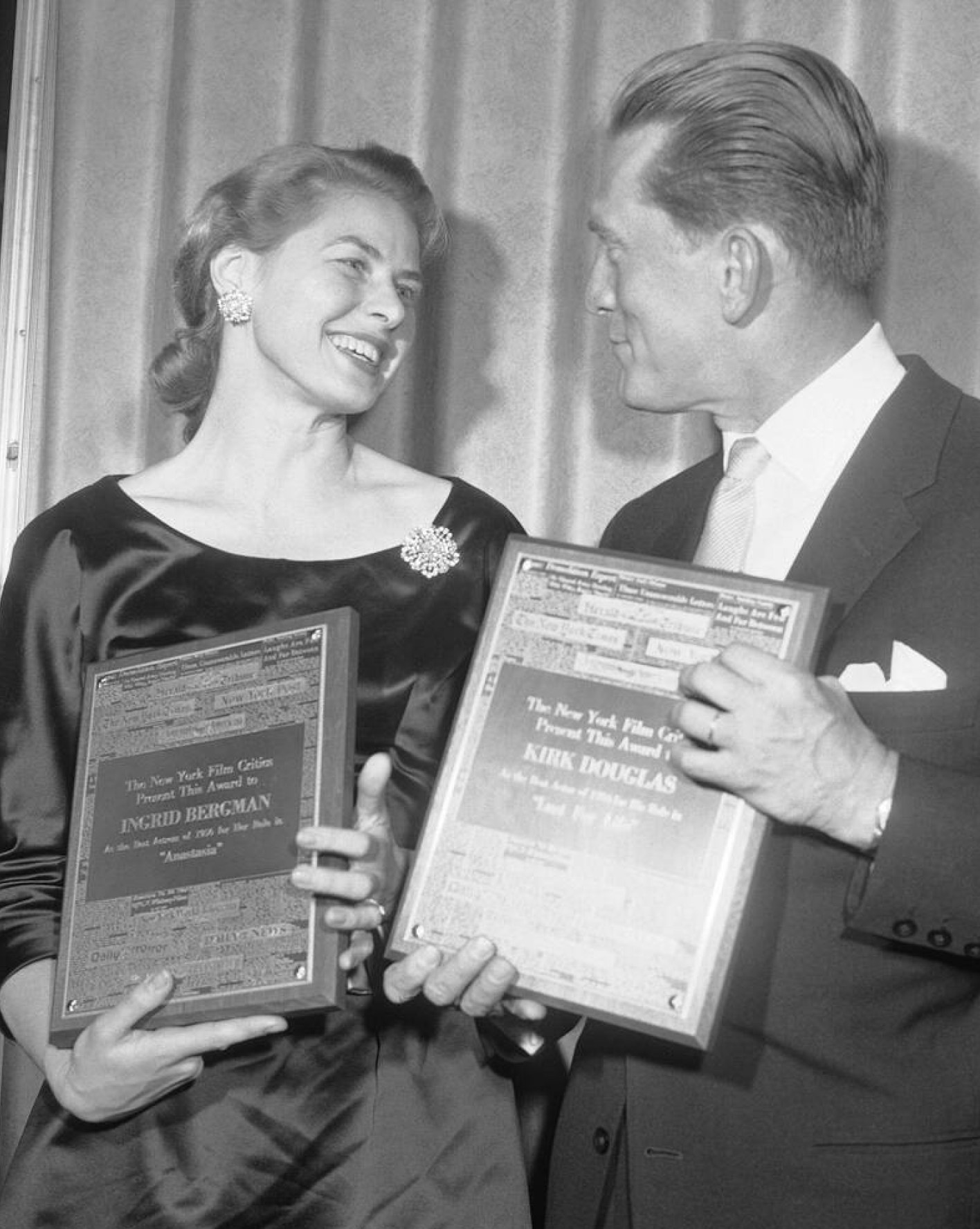
Award recipients Ingrid Bergman and Kirk Douglas at the 22nd New York Film Critics Circle Awards

- Best Film:
  - Around the World in Eighty Days
- Best Actor:
  - Kirk Douglas – Lust for Life
- Best Actress:
  - Ingrid Bergman – Anastasia
- Best Director:
  - John Huston – Moby Dick
- Best Screenplay:
  - S. J. Perelman – Around the World in Eighty Days
- Best Foreign Language Film:
  - La Strada • Italy
