= List of Not Going Out episodes =

Not Going Out is a British television sitcom created by, written by and starring Lee Mack as Lee, a man from Lancashire who lives in London. The series premiered on BBC One on 6 October 2006 and has since become the second-longest British sitcom, after Last of the Summer Wine. The supporting cast includes Tim Vine, Sally Bretton, Miranda Hart, Katy Wix, and Hugh Dennis.

== Series overview ==
Series	Episodes	Originally released	
Series	Episodes	First released	Last released
1	6	6 October 2006	10 November 2006
2	8	7 September 2007	21 December 2007
3	8	30 January 2009	23 December 2009
4	6	6 January 2011	10 February 2011
5	6	13 April 2012	18 May 2012
6	9	5 April 2013	24 December 2013
7	11	17 October 2014	24 December 2015
8	8	13 January 2017	24 December 2017
9	8	8 March 2018	21 December 2018
10	9	15 April 2019	24 December 2019
11	6	30 December 2020	5 February 2021
12	7	23 December 2021	29 April 2022
13	8	23 June 2023	24 December 2023
14	6	13 June 2025	19 July 2025
15	6	23 September 2026	29 October 2026

== Episodes ==
The original pilot has not been released in full; it was directed by Alex Hardcastle and Nick Wood, written by Lee Mack and Andrew Collins, and featured Catherine Tate in the role of Kate. Parts of the pilot were shown in the documentary 20 Years of Not Going Out, first broadcast on 23 September 2026.

== Docklands era ==
=== Series 1 (2006) ===
No. overall	No. in series	Title	Directed by	Written by	Original release date	UK viewers (millions)	Share
1	1	"Serious"	Alex Hardcastle and Nick Wood	Lee Mack and Andrew Collins	6 October 2006	2.83	13.9%
Lee tries to find his serious side by going on a date with an author, while Kate attempts to discover her lighter side at clown school. Kate's ex-boyfriend Tim tries to patch things up with her by finally apologising for his misdemeanors. First appearance of: Lee, Kate & Tim.
2	2	"Death"	Alex Hardcastle and Nick Wood	Lee Mack and Andrew Collins	13 October 2006	2.96	14.1%
Tim's grandmother dies, bringing him and Kate closer together, much to Lee's concern. He's encouraged to share his thoughts with a therapist, who is not impressed with Lee's inability to have a proper conversation. To add to this there is inappropriate behaviour at the funeral, a furious elderly relative and Tim's new tipple of choice is becoming addictive. Guest appearances of: Richard Freeman and Lorelei King.
3	3	"Aussie"	Alex Hardcastle and Nick Wood	Lee Mack and Andrew Collins	20 October 2006	2.85	13.8%
Ruth, an Australian friend of Kate's, comes to stay and Lee is persuaded to pretend to be Tim. Lee gets a job handing out leaflets at a shopping centre, but soon falls foul of a local youth. Guest appearances of Julia Morris as Ruth, Cordelia Bugeja as Julie and Jamie Borthwick as the youth
4	4	"Stress"	Alex Hardcastle and Nick Wood	Lee Mack and Andrew Collins	27 October 2006	3.24	15.6%
Lee finds himself increasingly stressed out having volunteered to teach Kate to drive. Following Kate's advice, he decides to try yoga - but his technique leaves a lot to be desired. A trip to a local acupuncturist is no more successful, so he resorts to more extreme measures. Meanwhile a drive in the countryside has a dramatic and disastrous conclusion.
5	5	"Kid"	Alex Hardcastle and Nick Wood	Lee Mack and Andrew Collins	3 November 2006	3.57	16.6%
Kate and Lee are forced to take in a lodger –a surly 14-year-old boy Nicky. Lee’s attempts to bond with the teenager prove less than successful, while Tim and Nicky discover they have quite a lot in common. Meanwhile, Kate tries to persuade a carnivorous Great Dane to become a vegetarian with unfortunate results. Guest appearance of (Rupert Simonian) as Nicky
6	6	"Caretaker"	Alex Hardcastle and Nick Wood	Lee Mack and Andrew Collins	10 November 2006	3.39	15.6%
Lee finally manages to get a job, as a caretaker. But taking up the new post involves moving out of the flat. Kate interviews potential new flatmates including Pete, and Tim sees an opportunity to get back together with Kate. Lee's new boss proves to be a hard taskmaster. So, will Lee stick at the job or throw in the towel and move back in with Kate? Final appearance of: Kate

=== Series 2 (2007) ===
No. overall	No. in series	Title	Directed by	Written by	Original release date	UK viewers (millions)	Share
7	1	"Mortgage"	Alex Hardcastle	Lee Mack, Simon Evans, Paul Kerensa and Peter Tilbury	7 September 2007	3.29	15.8%
Lee's former flatmate Kate has moved back to America, so Tim decides to sell the flat. Faced with homelessness, Lee announces he'll buy the flat himself and sets to work putting off any other prospective buyers, including Tim's sister Lucy. Things get worse when Lucy puts in an offer on the flat and Tim is forced to decide where his loyalties lie. First regular appearance of: Lucy & Barbara
8	2	"Gay"	Alex Hardcastle	Lee Mack, Andrew Collins, Simon Evans and Paul Kerensa	14 September 2007	3.19	15.7%
Tim is worried that he isn't manly enough. Lee is persuaded by Lucy to pretend to be gay in order for her to get closer to a new business acquaintance. Lee discovers there's something in it for him, but doesn't find it easy to keep his blokeish instincts hidden. First regular appearance of: Guy
9	3	"Librarian"	Alex Hardcastle	Lee Mack, Simon Evans, Paul Kerensa and Peter Tilbury	21 September 2007	3.36	16.9%
Lee is becoming increasingly riled by Guy's constant presence in the flat, and his distrust of him is fuelled by the discovery that he runs a lap-dancing club. Meanwhile. Tim finally seems to have found a girl who he really likes, and of whom Lucy approves. The perfect girl... until Tim finds out what she does for a living.
10	4	"Baby"	Alex Hardcastle	Lee Mack, Andrew Collins, Simon Evans and Paul Kerensa	28 September 2007	3.20	15.2%
Lucy is worried about the age gap between her and Guy, a concern that increases when Guy turns up to meet her with his grandson in tow. A family emergency means Lee and Tim are left in charge of the baby, and they prove to be less than perfect babysitters. Barbara is absent from this episode
11	5	"Art"	Alex Hardcastle	Lee Mack, Andrew Collins, Simon Evans and Paul Kerensa	5 October 2007	2.58	12.3%
In an effort to appear as intellectual as Lucy's friends, Lee shows off his 'knowledge' of the art world, holding forth on the subject of an unknown artist who his cleaner Barbara has told him is the next big thing. When Lucy takes his advice and invests a fortune in the artist's work, Lee is left trying to prevent her from finding out the artist is actually a nobody.
12	6	"Dating"	Alex Hardcastle	Lee Mack, Andrew Collins, Simon Evans and Paul Kerensa	12 October 2007	3.52	16.6%
As Lucy and Guy's relationship intensifies, Lee starts to ponder his lack of a girlfriend and, encouraged by Barbara, tries speed dating. Tim is forced to go on a disastrous date with Barbara in order to prove that he sees her as more than 'the help'. First regular appearance of: Daisy
13	7	"Gangster"	Alex Hardcastle	Lee Mack, Simon Evans, Paul Kerensa and Peter Tilbury	19 October 2007	3.61	16.8%
When Guy showers Lucy with expensive clothes prior to whisking her off for a mystery weekend away, Lee becomes suspicious of Guy. After some high-level surveillance, he comes to the conclusion that Guy is gangster. But Barbara and Tim realise that he is not objecting to Guy just because of his dubious business interests, but also because Lee wants Lucy for himself. Final appearance of: Guy
Christmas special
14	-	"Murder at Christmas"	Alex Hardcastle	Lee Mack, Andrew Collins, Simon Evans and Paul Kerensa	21 December 2007	3.77	17.0%
Lee's plan to spend time alone with Lucy at Christmas is threatened by the presence of Tim, Daisy, Tim and Lucy's parents, and even Barbara doing the cooking. All seems to be going well until a murder mystery game brings family tensions to a head. First recurring appearance of: Geoffrey & Wendy

=== Series 3 (2009) ===
No. overall	No. in series	Title	Directed by	Written by	Original release date	UK viewers (millions)	Share
15	1	"Pregnant"	Nick Wood	Lee Mack	30 January 2009	3.45	15.1%
When Lucy announces that she is pregnant, Lee wonders if the father might accidentally be him. He can't bring himself to tell Lucy how he thinks it might have happened, but Tim guesses. He is outraged at the thought of his friend and his sister together, but Lee has already started to warm to the idea of being a dad. Additional material: Simon Evans, Paul Kerensa, Dave Cohen, Oliver Dennis, Simon Griffiths, David Isaac and Liam Woodman
16	2	"Winner"	Nick Wood	Lee Mack and Andrew Collins	6 February 2009	3.26	13.7%
Lee is insufferably smug when he wins a thousand pounds in a writing competition with an essay entitled Disability in the Workplace. Lucy is moved to tears when she reads the essay - she had no idea that Lee was so sensitive. Tim, however, is more sceptical, and with good reason; when a journalist turns up to interview the winner, she is expecting to meet a disabled author.
17	3	"Amy"	Nick Wood	Lee Mack and Darin Henry	13 February 2009	3.16	14.1%
Over-excited by the appearance of a lesbian couple in their building, Lee and Tim ask them over for dinner, little realising that their adolescent attempt to get their jollies will backfire when Lucy discovers a side to herself that she never knew existed. Additional material: Simon Evans, Paul Kerensa, Georgia Pritchett, Dave Cohen, Milton Jones, Simon Griffiths, David Isaac and Liam Woodman
18	4	"Party"	Nick Wood	Lee Mack and Daniel Peak	20 February 2009	3.27	14.3%
When Tim and Lee try to organise a party for Lucy's 30th birthday, their ideas of what makes a good party differ widely; Tim likes a few games of charades, while Lee likes a do where there are no competitors for Lucy's attention. So when she arrives at the party arm-in-arm with another man, Lee makes it his mission to somehow get rid of him without causing a scene. Additional material: Simon Evans, Paul Kerensa, Dave Cohen, Simon Griffiths, David Isaac, Danielle Ward and Liam Woodman
19	5	"Neighbour"	Nick Wood	Lee Mack and Simon Dean	27 February 2009	3.19	14.6%
A new neighbour moves in upstairs, and his constant noise drives Lucy to distraction. She begs Lee and Tim to get him to stop, but neither is man enough. Tim takes being branded a coward to heart, and rushes off to join a boxing gym. Lee, meanwhile, tries to impress Lucy by confronting the man in his own flat, where he finds himself staring into the eyes of a cold killer. Additional material: Simon Evans, Paul Kerensa, Dave Cohen, Simon Griffiths, David Isaac, Stuart Sumner, Milton Jones and Liam Woodman
20	6	"Speech"	Nick Wood	Lee Mack	6 March 2009	3.51	16.2%
Lucy is stressed, as she has to make an important speech at a recruitment conference, and has nobody to help her write it. Sensing an opportunity to impress her, Lee offers his services, which upsets Tim, who also thinks he is the best man for the job. What started off as a small job soon turns into a competition between Tim and Lee not only to see who can come up with the wittiest lines, but also to establish which of them Lucy likes best.
21	7	"Marriage"	Nick Wood	Lee Mack	20 March 2009	3.59	17.4%
Lee is horrified when he hears that Lucy is considering marriage to Pavlov, a mechanic from the old Eastern bloc, just so that he can stay in the country. But he is a lone voice in trying to stop it, because one by one, as Lucy's family and friends hear Pavlov's tragic tales of life back home, they are persuaded that he is a perfect match for Lucy. Final appearance of Timothy West as Geoffrey Adams Additional material: Simon Evans, Paul Kerensa, Dave Cohen, Simon Griffiths, Liam Woodman and Georgia Pritchett
Christmas special
22	-	"Absent Father Christmas"	Nick Wood	Lee Mack and Daniel Peak	23 December 2009	2.40	14.7%
Lee's father turns up at the flat unannounced. This is the man who walked out of the family home when Lee was four, never paid his maintenance and ate Lee's goldfish. Lee wants him out of the flat, but Lucy tells him that the only way forward is to forgive and forget. Unfortunately, Lee's dad's behaviour makes this virtually impossible for Lee to achieve. Final appearance of: Barbara. First recurring appearance of: Frank Additional material: Simon Evans, Paul Kerensa, Dave Cohen, Simon Griffiths, David Isaac, Milton Jones and Liam Woodman

This episode was first broadcast on Comedy Central Extra on 24 July 2009, as the station had acquired and broadcast series 3 in its entirety; the BBC held back the episode to the intended 23 December broadcast date.

=== Series 4 (2011) ===
No. overall	No. in series	Title	Directed by	Written by	Original release date	UK viewers (millions)	Share
23	1	"Drugs"	Nick Wood	Lee Mack and Daniel Peak	6 January 2011	4.75	19.4%
After a night spent out clubbing, Tim returns to the flat wearing the wrong coat, and convinces Lee to help him return it to its owner. Additional material: Simon Evans, Paul Kerensa, Dave Cohen, Simon Griffiths, David Isaac, Liam Woodman and Milton Jones
24	2	"Debbie"	Nick Wood	Lee Mack and Andrew Collins	13 January 2011	4.18	17.4%
Lee's past catches up with him when a young woman appears on his doorstep and asks for a cup of sugar.
25	3	"Movie"	Nick Wood	Lee Mack and Daniel Peak	20 January 2011	4.04	17.4%
Lee promises to stop treating Lucy's flat as if he owns it - but not before he has hired it out to a film director. Additional material: Simon Evans, Paul Kerensa, Dave Cohen, Simon Griffiths, David Isaac, Liam Woodman and Milton Jones Note: The original BBC broadcast of this episode was edited in two places, presumably to remove more explicit sexual references. The DVD version is complete as can be seen when Lee is knelt down with the boom mic and just before he ends up on the floor with Rod.
26	4	"Dancing"	Nick Wood	Lee Mack and Darin Henry	27 January 2011	4.24	18.0%
Lucy and Tim are distraught. Their parents' thirty-year marriage is at an end, and their father has moved out of the family home... And into Lee's bedroom. First appearance of Geoffrey Whitehead as Geoffrey Adams Additional material: Simon Evans, Paul Kerensa, Dave Cohen, Simon Griffiths, David Isaac, Liam Woodman, Milton Jones and Jack Cutting
27	5	"Fireworks"	Nick Wood	Lee Mack	3 February 2011	3.67	15.7%
When an old lady wanders into Lucy's flat and makes herself at home on the sofa, Lee doesn't know what to do with her. Additional material: Simon Evans, Paul Kerensa, Dave Cohen, Simon Griffiths, David Isaac, Liam Woodman and Milton Jones
28	6	"Life on Mars Bars"	Nick Wood	Lee Mack	10 February 2011	3.74	15.6%
Lee dreams of a perfect life with Lucy, but can the reality ever match up? Additional material: Simon Evans, Paul Kerensa, Dave Cohen, Simon Griffiths, David Isaac, Liam Woodman and Milton Jones

=== Series 5 (2012) ===
No. overall	No. in series	Title	Directed by	Written by	Original release date	UK viewers (millions)	Share
29	1	"Band"	Nick Wood	Lee Mack and Daniel Peak	13 April 2012	5.18	19.6%
When Tim joins a band at work and Lucy falls for the lead guitarist, Lee becomes jealous, and decides that if he cannot beat them he should join them.
30	2	"Dads"	Nick Wood	Lee Mack and Daniel Peak	20 April 2012	4.83	18.4%
Lee's lazy weekend is wrecked when his scrounging father turns up unexpectedly. Having just come out of hospital, he needs somewhere to stay for the weekend. Will Lee take on the demanding role of carer? Additional material: Simon Evans, Dave Cohen, Paul Kerensa, Liam Woodman, Simon Griffiths and David Isaac
31	3	"Camping"	Nick Wood	Lee Mack	27 April 2012	4.77	17.6%
In a desperate bid to prove his manliness, Lee joins Tim, Daisy and Lucy on a camping weekend in the middle of a dark, spooky forest.
32	4	"Running"	Nick Wood	Lee Mack	4 May 2012	4.93	19.0%
To impress Lucy, Lee starts training for a 10 kilometre fun run, only to injure himself immediately. In an effort to hide the injury from Lucy, he gets himself a secret sports massage, but this just leads to more trouble.
33	5	"Examination"	Nick Wood	Lee Mack	11 May 2012	4.75	18.5%
Lucy finds herself working on a government initiative encouraging men to regularly check themselves for lumps. Eager to please Lucy, Lee follows the campaign's advice and discovers something he was not expecting. Additional material: Simon Evans, Paul Kerensa, Liam Woodman, David Isaac, Dave Cohen and Simon Griffiths
34	6	"Drunk"	Nick Wood	Lee Mack and Daniel Peak	18 May 2012	5.33	20.9%
After Lucy suffers a mild indiscretion whilst drunk and claims to have no memory of the event, she and Lee embark on an experiment with a bottle of home-made potato hooch to prove once and for all that you can remember what happens when you are mashed. Final regular appearance of Tim

=== Series 6 (2013) ===
No. overall	No. in series	Title	Directed by	Written by	Original release date	UK viewers (millions)	Share
35	1	"Rabbit"	Nick Wood	Lee Mack and Daniel Peak	5 April 2013	5.01	19.1%
When Lucy accidentally runs over a pet rabbit belonging to the daughter of an important client, she needs Lee and Daisy to help cover her tracks. Additional material: Simon Evans, Paul Kerensa, Dave Cohen, Simon Griffiths, Liam Woodman and David Isaac
36	2	"Skiing"	Nick Wood	Lee Mack and Daniel Peak	12 April 2013	4.52	16.9%
On a skiing trip to Eastern Europe, Lee, Lucy and Daisy get stuck in a cable car. Additional material: Simon Evans, Paul Kerensa, Dave Cohen, Simon Griffiths, Liam Woodman and David Isaac
37	3	"Therapy"	Nick Wood	Lee Mack and Daniel Peak	19 April 2013	3.66	16.0%
Lee takes advantage of Lucy's new-found skills as a relationship counsellor to patch things up with his father. Additional material: Simon Evans, Paul Kerensa, Dave Cohen, Simon Griffiths, Liam Woodman and David Isaac
38	4	"Conference"	Nick Wood	Lee Mack and Daniel Peak	3 May 2013	4.12	16.2%
Lee does what he has to do to stop Lucy from flirting with the male delegates at a three-day annual trade conference in order to get herself work. Additional material: Simon Evans, Paul Kerensa, Dave Cohen, Simon Griffiths, Liam Woodman and David Isaac
39	5	"Rachel"	Nick Wood	Lee Mack and Daniel Peak	10 May 2013	4.44	17.6%
Lee decides that the best way to get Lucy to notice him is to make her jealous. Now all he has to do is find himself a girlfriend. Additional material: Simon Evans, Paul Kerensa, Dave Cohen, Simon Griffiths, Liam Woodman and David Isaac
40	6	"Play"	Nick Wood	Lee Mack	17 May 2013	3.99	16.9%
When Lucy's first love reappears on the scene and wants Lucy to star in a romantic play that he has written especially for her, Lee is forced to fight for her attention. Additional material: Simon Evans, Paul Kerensa, Dave Cohen, Simon Griffiths, Liam Woodman and David Isaac Note: This was originally intended to be the final episode of the series. An alternative ending was filmed for this episode.
41	7	"Magic"	Nick Wood	Lee Mack	24 May 2013	4.22	17.4%
When Lucy's god-daughter is suddenly dumped on her the night before the girl's birthday party, Lucy and Lee have to come up with an appropriate entertainment for fourteen nine-year-olds. Additional material: Simon Evans, Paul Kerensa, Dave Cohen, Simon Griffiths, Liam Woodman and David Isaac
42	8	"Boat"	Nick Wood	Lee Mack and Daniel Peak	31 May 2013	3.87	14.7%
Lee spends a long weekend on his dad's new boat with Lucy, even though she is terrified of water.
Christmas special
43	-	"The House"	Ed Bye	Lee Mack and Daniel Peak	24 December 2013	5.00	22.5%
Lee invites Lucy's parents and Daisy to join them in an old country house for Christmas. However, there is a spooky presence.

=== Series 7 (2014–15) ===
No. overall	No. in series	Title	Directed by	Written by	Original release date	UK viewers (millions)	Share
44	1	"Mugging"	Nick Wood	Lee Mack and Daniel Peak	17 October 2014	4.39	16.5%
When Lucy has her handbag stolen from right under Lee's nose, he feels the need to prove his manliness over and over and over again. Additional material: Simon Evans, Paul Kerensa, Dave Cohen, Simon Griffiths, Liam Woodman and David Isaac
45	2	"Christening"	Nick Wood	Lee Mack and Daniel Peak	24 October 2014	4.14	15.8%
Lee's big mouth has got him and Lucy invited to a christening party thrown by new neighbours Toby and Anna, and now they have no time to find the perfect present for the baby who has everything. First appearance of Toby and Anna. Additional material: Simon Evans, Paul Kerensa, Dave Cohen, Simon Griffiths, Liam Woodman and David Isaac
46	3	"Donor"	Nick Wood	Lee Mack and Daniel Peak	31 October 2014	3.97	15.7%
When Lucy decides it is time to have a baby, she is surprised to find the whole family taking a personal interest in the conception. Additional material: Simon Evans, Paul Kerensa, Dave Cohen, Simon Griffiths, Liam Woodman and David Isaac
47	4	"Anna"	Nick Wood	Lee Mack and Daniel Peak	7 November 2014	4.60	17.5%
Lucy aspires to be friends with her posh new neighbours Toby and Anna, but she hasn't reckoned on Lee dragging her back down to earth. Additional material: Simon Evans, Paul Kerensa, Dave Cohen, Simon Griffiths, Liam Woodman and David Isaac
48	5	"Pointless"	Nick Wood	Lee Mack and Daniel Peak	21 November 2014	4.09	13.7%
In an attempt to impress Lucy with his intellectual prowess, Lee joins Daisy as a contestant on the TV quiz show Pointless. Guest appearances of Alexander Armstrong and Richard Osman as themselves. Additional material: Simon Evans, Paul Kerensa, Dave Cohen, Simon Griffiths, Liam Woodman and David Isaac
49	6	"Alcohol"	Nick Wood	Lee Mack and Daniel Peak	28 November 2014	3.59	12.6%
Frank's drinking becomes a problem and forces Lee and Lucy to reassess the living arrangements in the flat. Additional material: Simon Evans, Paul Kerensa, Dave Cohen, Simon Griffiths, Liam Woodman and David Isaac Guest starring- Sandra Huggett
50	7	"Surprise"	Nick Wood	Lee Mack and Daniel Peak	5 December 2014	3.63	12.5%
No matter what happens, Lucy's surprise party for her parents' anniversary must remain a secret or it won't be a surprise. So why she tells Lee about it is anyone's guess. Additional material: Simon Evans, Paul Kerensa, Dave Cohen, Simon Griffiths, Liam Woodman and David Isaac
51	8	"Plane"	Nick Wood	Lee Mack and Daniel Peak	12 December 2014	4.18	16.5%
Flying off on a summer holiday, Lucy and Daisy endure the worst flight of their lives when Lee gets a bad case of the jitters on the plane. Hugh Dennis, who plays Toby, voices the unseen pilot, Captain Morris.
52	9	"Lucy"	Nick Wood	Lee Mack and Daniel Peak	19 December 2014	3.79	12.5%
Lee spends time in the bar with Toby worrying that the woman of his dreams is drifting further away.
Christmas specials
53	10	"The Wedding"	Nick Wood	Lee Mack and Daniel Peak	24 December 2014	4.10	13.9%
The will-they-won't-they tension reaches new highs in this epic series finale for Christmas that sees Lucy and Lee in previously uncharted emotional waters. Final cameo appearance of Tim. Additional material: Simon Evans, Paul Kerensa, Dave Cohen, Simon Griffiths, Liam Woodman and David Isaac Note: The title of this episode was withheld from listings in order to maintain the surprise outcome of the previous episode. BBC iPlayer has listed this episode as a Christmas special. This episode also features a number of characters from previous episodes.
54	-	"Christmas Shopping"	Nick Wood	Lee Mack and Daniel Peak	24 December 2015	2.92	19.2%
Christmas special of the sitcom featuring happy-go-lucky Lee, Lucy and their friends. It is Christmas Eve and newlyweds Lee and Lucy are doing some last-minute shopping when an unexpected stranger turns their Christmas upside down. Final appearance of Daisy This episode was not filmed in front of a live studio audience, but the audience is added in as sound effects Additional material: Simon Evans, Paul Kerensa, Dave Cohen, Simon Griffiths, Liam Woodman and David Isaac.

== Walton-on-Thames era ==
=== Series 8 (2017) ===
No. overall	No. in series	Title	Directed by	Written by	Original release date	UK viewers (millions)	Share
55	1	"Romance"	Nick Wood	Lee Mack and Daniel Peak	13 January 2017	5.52	19.3%
After eight years of marriage, Lee and Lucy disagree over how to keep the romance alive. First recurring appearance of Charlie, Benji and Molly.
56	2	"Babysitting"	Nick Wood	Lee Mack and Daniel Peak	20 January 2017	4.47	15.9%
Lucy causes offence by choosing the wrong babysitter. First recurring appearance of Jack.
57	3	"Car"	Nick Wood	Lee Mack and Daniel Peak	3 February 2017	4.70	19.2%
Lee's hopes for a stress-free ferry trip to France with Lucy and the children are dashed when they don't leave enough time for the car journey. Guest starring the voice of Rob Brydon as George.
58	4	"Hot Tub"	Nick Wood	Lee Mack and Daniel Peak	10 February 2017	4.49	17.7%
Lee and Lucy play hot tub fantasy date with Anna and Toby, causing them to end up in hot water. Guest appearances of Emma Bunton and Susie Dent as themselves.
59	5	"Charlie"	Nick Wood	Lee Mack and Sarah Morgan	17 February 2017	4.59	17.3%
Lee is worried that Charlie is getting a reputation at school for being the class clown. First appearance of Miss Anstis
60	6	"Marriage Guidance"	Nick Wood	Lee Mack and Daniel Peak	24 February 2017	3.94	15.1%
If Lee and Lucy's marriage wasn't in trouble before they go to marriage counselling, it is by the time they leave.
61	7	"Enough"	Nick Wood	Lee Mack and Daniel Peak	3 March 2017	3.92	TBA
Are Lee and Lucy ready for another child?
Christmas special
62	-	"The True Meaning of Christmas"	Nick Wood	Lee Mack and Daniel Peak	24 December 2017	5.63	TBA
Can Lee and Lucy agree on the true meaning of Christmas? This episode was the final television appearance of Keith Barron and featured a dedication to his memory.

=== Series 9 (2018) ===
No. overall	No. in series	Title	Directed by	Written by	Original release date	UK viewers (millions)
63	1	"Home Improvements"	Nick Wood	Lee Mack and Daniel Peak	8 March 2018	5.27
Lucy's father reluctantly allows Lee to help Lucy clear up the builder's mess in their new kitchen extension.
64	2	"Escape Room"	Nick Wood	Lee Mack and Daniel Peak	15 March 2018	5.17
As a surprise for Lee's birthday, Lucy invites the whole family to join them in an escape room. The children are absent from this episode for the first time since they first appeared.
65	3	"Stolen"	Nick Wood	Lee Mack and Daniel Peak	22 March 2018	4.58
A missing toy keyring causes a rift between Lee and Lucy and best friends Toby and Anna.
66	4	"Pets"	Nick Wood	Lee Mack and Daniel Peak	29 March 2018	4.24
To teach the children to be more responsible, Lee and Lucy get a family pet
67	5	"Pants on Fire"	Nick Wood	Lee Mack and Daniel Peak	5 April 2018	4.29
Lee and Lucy open up a can of worms when they cancel dinner with Toby and Anna at the last moment.
68	6	"Lollipop Man"	Nick Wood	Lee Mack and Sarah Morgan	12 April 2018	4.59
Lee and Lucy object to the school lollipop man handing out lollipops to the kids.
69	7	"Bust Up"	Nick Wood	Lee Mack and Sarah Morgan	19 April 2018	3.72
Encouraged by Anna, Lucy considers whether a breast augmentation is for her. The children are absent from this episode
Christmas special
70	-	"Ding Dong Merrily on Live"	Nick Wood	Lee Mack and Daniel Peak	21 December 2018	5.05
Dragooned into organising a Christmas variety show to raise money for their children's school, Lee and Lucy find quality acts thin on the ground. The children are absent from this episode For the first time, Not Going Out is broadcast live on BBC One

=== Series 10 (2019) ===
No. overall	No. in series	Title	Directed by	Written by	Original release date	UK viewers (millions)
71	1	"Parachute"	Nick Wood	Lee Mack and Daniel Peak	15 April 2019	3.69
Toby organises a sponsored parachute jump to raise money for a children’s ward in his hospital. Supportively, Lee, Lucy, Anna and the grandparents all agree to take part, but once airborne, will everyone pluck up the courage to jump? The children are absent from this episode
72	2	"Holiday Share"	Nick Wood	Lee Mack and Daniel Peak	22 April 2019	3.27
Can Lee and Lucy’s friendship with Toby and Anna survive a long weekend in a damp cottage in the New Forest? The children are absent from this episode
73	3	"Facts of Life"	Nick Wood	Lee Mack and Sarah Morgan	29 April 2019	3.27
Lee is outraged that the twins have started sex education at school and resolves to teach them everything he knows about the facts of life before Miss Anstis corrupts them. Anna and Charlie are absent from this episode
74	4	"Schooling"	Nick Wood	Lee Mack and Daniel Peak	6 May 2019	3.34
When Charlie’s school gets a bad Ofsted rating, Lee and Lucy start looking around for alternative schools. Despite Frank's protests, Geoffrey and Wendy offer to pay to send Charlie to a private school, which presents Lee and Lucy with a moral dilemma.
75	5	"Memory"	Nick Wood	Lee Mack and Daniel Peak	13 May 2019	3.27
Lee interrupts Lucy’s favourite television programme by plonking himself down next to her on the sofa, eating her chocolates and talking loudly all the way through the dialogue. When he suddenly finds he can’t remember the name of the leading actor and his hypochondria tells him he is losing his memory, Lucy's evening is ruined. Lee and Lucy are the only characters in this episode, other than Wendy, who Lucy speaks to on the phone at the start of the episode. However she does not appear on screen and Deborah Grant is not credited.
76	6	"Whodunnit?"	Nick Wood	Lee Mack and Daniel Peak	20 May 2019	2.98
Unable to convince Lucy that he didn’t smash her precious antique vase - an heirloom that belonged to her grandmother - Lee summons the family to a meeting to flush out the culprit. The children are absent from this episode
77	7	"Builder"	Nick Wood	Lee Mack, Sarah Morgan and Daniel Peak	27 May 2019	3.05
Lucy takes the kids away to her parents while Lee stays in the house to oversee the building work in their kitchen. Unfortunately, the builder Lee has employed to do the job has an annoyingly relaxed attitude to deadlines. The children are absent from this episode
Specials
78	-	"Halloween Special"	Nick Wood	Lee Mack and Daniel Peak	30 October 2019	3.61
It’s Halloween and Lee and Lucy take the children out trick or treating. Lee accidentally drops his phone in the porch of a spooky Victorian house and makes the mistake of going back to retrieve it. Once there, he discovers that the house is full of secrets that would be far better left undisturbed. This episode was not filmed in front of a live audience
79	-	"Driving Home for Christmas"	Nick Wood	Lee Mack and Daniel Peak	24 December 2019	4.05
On Christmas Eve, Lee and Lucy regret leaving their Christmas shopping to the last minute when Lucy’s wallet and mobile phone are stolen from a department store. Lee wants revenge, and in pursuit of the thief they are led further and further away from home, into the depths of the countryside, from which there is no return.

=== Series 11 (2020–21) ===
No. overall	No. in series	Title	Directed by	Written by	Original release date	UK viewers (millions)
New Year special
80	-	"Resolutions"	Nick Wood	Lee Mack and Daniel Peak	30 December 2020	4.43
With 40 minutes to go until midnight, a New Year’s Eve party at Lee and Lucy’s house turns sour when family members start making their resolutions. The closing credits feature a tribute to Bobby Ball, who died weeks after filming. The children are absent from this episode. This episode was filmed in entirely one location (the living room).
Series
81	1	"Small Package"	Nick Wood	Lee Mack and Daniel Peak	8 January 2021	Unknown (Note: This episode did not make it into the top 50 most viewed programmes of the week. Therefore full figures are not available.)
Social niceties are stretched to snapping point when Lee and Lucy take in a package for their neighbour and inadvertently discover that it contains an embarrassing object that Lee now has to return. That proves to be easier said than done. Anna, Charlie and Benji are absent from this episode. Molly can be seen in the window, and Francesca Newman is credited in the cast list at the end of the episode. However, she does not speak.
82	2	"Pub Quiz"	Nick Wood	Lee Mack and Sarah Morgan	15 January 2021	Unknown
To celebrate their anniversary, Lee and Lucy plan a friendly night of quizzing with Toby and Anna in their local pub, but the evening is derailed when neither couple can bear to lose to their partners and the foursome splits into rival teams. The children are absent from this episode. The entire episode takes place in the pub.
83	3	"Carol"	Nick Wood	Lee Mack and Neil Webster	22 January 2021	Unknown
When Lee's feckless dad, Frank, announces that he's engaged to be married, Lee cannot believe that any woman would want to marry him. There must be something wrong with her. Lucy invites Frank and Carol to dinner to allay Lee’s fears. Carol turns out to be perfect, but now Lee is even more nervous. Frank seems to dote on her. If Carol dumps Frank, Frank will be devastated. Then it will be Lee’s shoulder that Frank will cry on, and Lee cannot cope with that. In an effort to find out what Carol is up to, Lee joins Frank’s dating app and puts himself forward as a potential date for Carol. If she bites, he will know she’s up to no good. Anna, Toby and the children are absent from this episode.
84	4	"Old Acquaintance"	Nick Wood	Lee Mack and Daniel Peak	29 January 2021	4.16
When Lee joins Facebook for the first time and is contacted by an ex-girlfriend from 20 years ago, Lucy is annoyed that she cares so much. Her feelings are complicated by the sudden reappearance of a friend from university, with whom she had a brief relationship. Threatened by fond memories from the past, Lee and Lucy start behaving badly. The children are absent from this episode.
85	5	"War"	Nick Wood	Lee Mack and Daniel Peak	5 February 2021	Unknown
The family visit to the war graves in Normandy gets off to a bad start, and Lucy discovers that her grandfather, Wendy’s father, was not the man she thought he was. Anna and Toby are absent from this episode. Final appearance of Frank. A tribute to Bobby Ball and a montage of clips featuring Frank is shown after the closing credits. This episode was filmed in entirely one location (the living room).

=== Series 12 (2021–22) ===
No. overall	No. in series	Title	Directed by	Written by	Original release date	UK viewers (millions)
Christmas special
86	-	"Panto"	Nick Wood	Lee Mack and Daniel Peak	23 December 2021	Unknown
A family Christmas party turns sour when Lucy announces that she has got tickets to see Jason Donovan in panto. Lee loathes panto, especially given Jason Donovan was Lucy’s teenage crush. That night, while Lee and Lucy turn their backs on each other in bed, Lee has an unsettling dream in which he is dressed as Buttons and his whole life has turned into a pantomime. Lucy is Cinderella, Toby and Anna are the Ugly Sisters, Geoffrey is Baron Hardup, and Wendy is the Fairy Godmother - and Prince Charming, the handsome suitor who pursues Cinderella and asks for her hand in marriage, is played by Jason Donovan. Can Buttons keep the fairy-tale couple apart? Guest stars: Jason Donovan and Rick Astley as themselves. The children are absent from this episode.
Series
87	1	"Painting"	Nick Wood	Lee Mack and Daniel Peak	25 March 2022	Unknown
Wendy paints a portrait of Lee's late father, Frank, and gives it to Lee and Lucy as a present. She is expecting them to love it, but that would require the painting to be not just competent but good. Once it’s hanging on their wall, Lee and Lucy must contrive to lose the painting without Wendy or Geoffrey noticing. Anna, Toby, Charlie and Benji are absent from this episode.
88	2	"Text"	Nick Wood	Lee Mack and Daniel Peak	1 April 2022	Unknown
When Lee accidentally sends a rude text about Anna to Lucy, he makes the stupid mistake of sending it to Anna herself. Lee and Lucy now face the impossible task of stealing Anna's phone and deleting the text before she reads it. Toby and the children are absent from this episode.
89	3	"Friend"	Nick Wood	Lee Mack	8 April 2022	Unknown
Lee makes no effort to talk to other parents in the playground, and Lucy is worried that he is becoming isolated and friendless. She fires him up to go into school and make some new friends. Reluctantly Lee gives it a try. He opens up with strangers and makes friends with another lone male, Keith. But Keith is even less sociable than Lee. Anna, Charlie and Benji are absent from this episode.
90	4	"Front Window"	Nick Wood	Lee Mack and Daniel Peak	15 April 2022	Unknown
Confined to a wheelchair, his right leg encased in plaster after knee surgery, Lee has too much time on his hands, which he uses to watch the world go by through a pair of high-powered binoculars. He soon realises that all is not well in his neighbour’s house opposite. In fact, he is quickly convinced that something despicable is going on. Anna, Toby and the children are absent from this episode.
91	5	"Jury"	Nick Wood	Lee Mack and Daniel Peak	22 April 2022	2.73
Lee does jury service and joins 11 other jurors to debate whether the accused is guilty or not. A simple enough task - until Lee decides to put the other jurors on trial. Lee is the only main character in this episode. This is the only episode Lucy is absent from since her first appearance in Series 2, Episode 1. The whole episode takes place at the courthouse. Anna, Toby and the children are also absent from this episode. Jocelyn Jee Esien reprises her role as the police community support officer from the previous episode, as a juror. The episode contains multiple references, and is similar in concept, to Twelve Angry Men.
92	6	"Tent"	Nick Wood	Lee Mack and Daniel Peak	29 April 2022	Unknown
Lee organises a family camping trip in an attempt to bring the generations together. But even though he has remembered to bring his guitar for campfire sing-songs, he's forgotten to check the weather. And when Lucy finds something in the woods that looks very much like a human bone, the unhappy campers cannot wait to leave. This is Charlie's and Benji's first appearance since Series 11, Episode 6. This is also Jack's first appearance since Series 9, Episode 3, and his final appearance overall.

=== Series 13 (2023) ===
All episodes were made available on BBC iPlayer prior to the linear broadcast of the first episode, on 23 June 2023.

No. overall	No. in series	Title	Directed by	Written by	Original release date (Note: With the series premiere, all 7 episodes were made available on iPlayer.)	UK viewers (millions)
93	1	"Italian Lessons"	Nick Wood	Lee Mack and Daniel Peak	23 June 2023	2.63
When Lee and Lucy are asked to cover for Anna on more than one occasion, so that she can go out at night and have secret Italian lessons, they suspect the worst – that she is having an affair. Lee decides that it is up to him to tell Toby that his marriage is in jeopardy and sets about finding the evidence. The children are absent from this episode.
94	2	"Hospital"	Nick Wood	Lee Mack and Daniel Peak	30 June 2023	2.64
Lee's lifestyle catches up on him and he is forced to wait on a hospital ward for routine surgery on his gallbladder until his blood pressure comes down. But visits from the parents-in-law and Anna and Toby, who arrive to ask him a question he doesn't want to hear, ensure that his stress levels remain dangerously high. The children are absent from this episode. The entire episode takes place at the hospital.
95	3	"Day Out"	Nick Wood	Lee Mack and Daniel Peak	7 July 2023	Unknown
To take advantage of three free tickets to Adventure Canyon Theme Park, Lee takes Mollie out of school for a day and gets into trouble with the new head teacher, Miss Anstis. Now all he has to do is think of an excuse to justify Mollie's absence. What could be simpler than a trip to the dentist? This episode was shown on BBC Two due to coverage of the 2023 Wimbledon Championships being shown on BBC One at the same time. Anna and Toby are absent from this episode.
96	4	"Coffin"	Nick Wood	Lee Mack and Daniel Peak	14 July 2023	2.50
Lee wakes up inside a coffin and can't remember how he got there, until a phone call from Lucy reminds him what he’d been doing that afternoon. Now all he needs to do is keep Lucy in the dark as to his exact location and work out how to escape. Anna, Toby, Benji and Molly are absent from this episode.
97	5	"Train"	Nick Wood	Lee Mack, Daniel Peak and Chris McCausland	21 July 2023	2.61
It’s Lucy's birthday. To celebrate, Geoffrey and Wendy take Lee, Lucy, Toby and Anna for a trip on a vintage steam train. But Lee's decision to play Poirot when a stranger turns up unannounced in their carriage risks Lucy’s special day being ruined. The children are absent from this episode. Guest starring Chris McCausland.
98	6	"Beep"	Nick Wood	Lee Mack and Daniel Peak	28 July 2023	2.75
Lucy has cooked a special meal so that she and Lee can spend an evening in without distractions to talk about the state of their marriage. But Lee is obsessed with a beeping noise in the house that he can’t find, and the food is soon forgotten. Anna, Toby, Charlie and Benji are absent from this episode.
99	7	"Football"	Nick Wood	Lee Mack and Daniel Peak	4 August 2023	2.38
When Lee goes to watch Benji playing football for a local under-13 team, he is unable to restrain himself on the touchline and becomes the competitive dad that all other parents want to avoid. Undaunted by the disapproval of Toby, who coaches the team, Lee sets about rigging the vote for the player of the year. Anna is absent from this episode. Guest starring Melvyn Hayes.
Christmas special
100	8	"Wilfred"	Nick Wood	Lee Mack and Daniel Peak	24 December 2023	3.86
Lee makes a big effort to create the perfect Christmas for his family by agreeing to Lucy's wish to do something charitable for once. They invite a lonely, old pensioner from the nearby care home to join them for Christmas dinner, only to discover that Wilfred is not allowed to drink alcohol. Final appearances of Charlie, Benji, Molly, Wendy and Geoffrey. Final regular appearances of Anna and Toby.

== Countryside era ==
=== Series 14 (2025) ===
This series features another time-jump and location move. All episodes were made available on iPlayer prior to the linear broadcast of the first episode, on 13 June 2025.

No. overall	No. in series	Title	Directed by	Written by	BBC One airdate	UK viewers (millions)
101	1	"House Move"	Nick Wood	Lee Mack and Daniel Peak	13 June 2025	2.54
Lee and Lucy are moving house and viewing a property that Lucy loves when, embarrassingly, Lee needs the loo. Before he can use it, however, a second buyer turns up to take a look at the property. To dissuade him from putting in an offer, Lee pretends to be the vendor. Guest starring Mike Wozniak, Ray Fearon and Eileen O'Brien.
102	2	"Doll"	Nick Wood	Lee Mack and Daniel Peak	20 June 2025	2.32
Lee brings a battered box home from the tip and proudly shows it to Lucy. They are both horrified to discover that he has scavenged a second-hand sex doll. Where Lee sees a profit, Lucy only sees a manky mannequin and wants it gone from the house immediately. Reluctantly, Lee does as he’s told, not realising what he’s dealing with... Guest starring Laurence Howarth and Angela McHale.
103	3	"Campervan"	Nick Wood	Lee Mack and Daniel Peak	27 June 2025	2.29
Lee has borrowed a 30-year-old campervan from his cousin to take Lucy away for the weekend. It has seen better days, however, and she is not impressed. But before she can relocate to a local hotel, there is a knock at the door, and their neighbouring camper barges in for a cup of tea. Only it’s not just a cup of tea this strange woman wants, as Lee and Lucy discover when she shares her deepest, darkest secrets. Guest starring Felicity Montagu.
104	4	"Oasis"	Nick Wood	Lee Mack and Daniel Peak	4 July 2025	N/A (<1.89) (Note: Not reported in the weekly top 50 programmes for four-screen viewer ratings.)
Lee’s favourite band is Oasis, which is why he rushed online to buy tickets to see them in concert. A year on, he still can’t come to terms with the fact that he lost his place in the queue and missed out. Lucy suggests a night in watching Oasis on the TV instead, but Lee can’t get over this feeling he’s had for a long time... that it was all Lucy’s fault. This episode's linear broadcast was moved to BBC Two at the last minute, due to overrunning Wimbledon coverage on BBC One.
105	5	"Dragon Castle"	Nick Wood	Lee Mack and Daniel Peak	12 July 2025	1.91
Lee and Lucy look to a career in the movies when they play background elves on the set of a popular mini-TV series, Dragon Castle. Their aspirations to become leading actors, however, are thwarted by their lack of talent. This episode was shown in a Saturday 9:40pm slot, as opposed to the usual Friday 9pm slot, due to UEFA Women's Euro 2025 coverage in Friday primetime. Guest starring Matthew Kelly.
106	6	"Hotel Room"	Nick Wood	Lee Mack and Daniel Peak	19 July 2025	2.23
When Lee uses his collection of free discount vouchers to stay overnight in a mid-range hotel, he makes sure that he takes advantage of all the hotel’s complimentary services. Unfortunately, the packet of peanuts that he consumes from the minibar is not free, but he’s damned if he’s going to pay for it. This episode was shown in a Saturday 9:40pm slot, as opposed to the usual Friday 9pm slot, due to UEFA Women's Euro 2025 coverage in Friday primetime. Guest starring Margaret Cabourn-Smith and Diana Vickers.

=== Series 15 (2026) ===
This series coincides with the 20th anniversary of the sitcom since its inception in 2006.

No. overall	No. in series	Title	Directed by	Written by	BBC One airdate	UK viewers (millions)
107	1	"Twentieth"	Nick Wood	Lee Mack and Daniel Peak	23 September 2026	Unknown
When Lucy’s goddaughter Ella has her 20th birthday party in their house, Lucy forbids Lee from leaving the bedroom to check that everything’s OK in case he ruins Ella’s big day. But when Lee hears someone playing his precious special edition Frankie Goes to Hollywood LP, he can’t stop himself from rushing downstairs to save it.
108	2	"Anna and Toby"	Nick Wood	Lee Mack and Daniel Peak	30 September 2026	TBA
When a beauty treatment goes horribly wrong, Lucy refuses to show her face in public. This creates an embarrassing headache for Lee because Anna and Toby are due to arrive at any moment for a long-awaited weekend visit. Lee spins all sorts of lies to stop them discovering the truth. Guest appearances of Anna and Toby.
109	3	"Superfan"	Nick Wood	Lee Mack and Daniel Peak	8 October 2026	TBA
After receiving a Cameo birthday message from one of his comedy heroes, Nigel Planer, Lee does not realise that Lucy has paid for it. So, when he sees Nigel in a packed restaurant, he rushes over to introduce himself, assuming that they must now be best friends. This is news to Nigel. Guest appearance of Nigel Planer
110	4	"Filthy Rich"	Nick Wood	Lee Mack and Daniel Peak	15 October 2026	TBA
When two women from the local church turn up on the doorstep to offer spiritual guidance, Lee and Lucy invite them in to referee an argument that they are having about money. Unfortunately, Lee and Lucy learn the hard way that the love of money is the root of all evil.
111	5	"Dream Catcher"	Nick Wood	Lee Mack and Daniel Peak	22 October 2026	TBA
Lee is sceptical about all the witchy woo-woo stuff on display at an alternative craft fair where Lucy is trying to sell her badly made dream catchers. Unfortunately, his attitude irritates everyone at the fair and ensures that Lucy can't sell any of her stock.
112	6	"Banksy"	Nick Wood	Lee Mack and Daniel Peak	29 October 2026	TBA
Lee finds an undiscovered Banksy and attempts to steal the artwork in a foolhardy quest for fame and fortune. When he is collared by a security guard, however, he panics and hints that he might be Banksy to get away. Now, he finds himself at the centre of a blackmail plot.

== Ratings ==
Not Going Out : UK viewers per episode (millions)
Audience measurement performed by Broadcasters' Audience Research Board

== Miscellaneous ==
No. overall	No. in season	Title	Directed by	Written by	Original release date	UK viewers (millions)	Share
–	–	"Children in Need - Wogan"	Ed Bye	Lee Mack	16 November 2012	8.06	32.7%
Lee, Lucy and Daisy are desperately trying to think of a way to convince Mr. Namasaki (Akie Kotabe), a Japanese client of Lucy's, that they did not poison his prize carp. Unexpectedly, Terry Wogan arrives and asks for a donation for Children in Need or else he will send Pudsey the Bear round to keep an "eye" on them. Lee then quickly runs through the audience with the donation bucket and gets them to donate.
–	–	"The Outtakes"	Alex Hardcastle and Nick Wood	Lee Mack	27 December 2014	N/A	N/A
A compilation of outtakes from the series broadcast on BBC One in conjunction with the seventh series.
–	–	"Not Going Beyond Paradise"	Unknown	Unknown	21 March 2025	N/A	N/A
Filmed for Red Nose Day 2025, a crossover sketch with Beyond Paradise in which Sally Bretton's characters are mistaken for each other.
