= List of fictional actuaries =

Fictional actuaries and the appearance of actuaries in works of fiction have been the subject of a number of articles in actuarial journals.

== Film ==
- About Schmidt (2002) - Warren Schmidt is portrayed by Jack Nicholson; the movie mostly covers Schmidt's adventures about retiring from an insurance company
- Along Came Polly (2004) - Reuben Feffer (played by Ben Stiller) is a risk assessment expert, and though not explicitly stated, performs the job of an underwriter
- Are You With It? (1948) - a musical comedy featuring Donald O'Connor as an actuary who is forced to join a carnival after misplacing a decimal point on a statistical table
- The Billion Dollar Bubble (1976) - featuring James Woods, based on the Equity Funding scandal
- Boyhood (2014) - Mason Evans, Sr. (played by Ethan Hawke) mentions at a baseball game that he recently passed his second actuarial exam, and later discusses his job at an insurance firm
- Class Action (1991) - featured Gene Hackman and Mary Elizabeth Mastrantonio as father and daughter lawyers on opposite sides of a massive class action lawsuit; actuarial analysis plays a key role in the outcome
- Double Indemnity (1944) - a Billy Wilder film, with Fred MacMurray and Barbara Stanwyck; possibly the first to feature an actuary; the plot revolves around a murder that seeks to gain advantage from a particular aspect of an insurance policy; an insurance investigator (played by Edward G. Robinson) knows the actuarial statistics and becomes suspicious
- Escape Clause (1996) - Andrew McCarthy plays Richard Ramsay in an actuarial thriller; to quote TVguide.com, "The makers of this direct-to-video release thought the world was ready for a thriller about an insurance actuary. They thought wrong."
- Fight Club (1999) - Edward Norton plays the protagonist, who briefly describes that his job entails the assessment of risk associated with car accidents for an insurance company; though not explicitly stated, he performs the job of an underwriter who uses actuarially derived premiums to benchmark quotes
- Groundhog Day (1993) - Bill Murray's character Phil Connors is pestered daily by talkative insurance salesman Ned, who at one point insists that he has friends "who live and die by the actuarial tables."
- The Ice Road (2021) - Varnay (played by Bengamin Walker); he introduces himself as an insurance actuary
- It Chapter Two (2019) - James Ransone plays the adult version of Eddie Kaspbrak, who explains during the Losers Club's reunion dinner that he works as a risk analyst in New York. (In the novel and 1990 miniseries versions of the story, Eddie instead owns a limo company.)
- Saw VI (2009) - William Easton is a health insurance executive who describes actuarial mathematics in a conversation with John Kramer
- Stranger than Fiction (2006) - Harold Crick (played by Will Ferrell), a socially isolated IRS auditor, mentions that he was once engaged to an auditor who left him for an actuary
- Paddington (film) (2017) - Henry Brown (played by Hugh Bonneville) is a devoted risk analyst at an insurance company and uses actuarial knowledge to predict that having a bear in the house will increase the chances of major disaster occurring by 4000%
- Sweet Charity (1969) - documents the romantic life of an actuary played by John McMartin (with Shirley MacLaine as his love interest)
- Thirteen Conversations About One Thing (2001) - starring Matthew McConaughey; the lives of a lawyer, an actuary, a housecleaner, a professor, and the people around them intersect as they ponder order and happiness in the face of life's cold unpredictability
- Tron - the character Ram (played by Dan Shor) is an actuarial computer program
- Zootopia (also released as Zootropolis) (2016) - the character Jaguar is a young tiger who aspires to be an actuary.
- Hellboy (2019) - the character Major Ben Daimio, played by Daniel Dae Kim, states that he was once an actuary, and used to assess risk based on a series of complex mathematical equations

== Literature ==
- The Areas of My Expertise - by John Hodgman; portrays actuaries as prophets who predict the future, and are organized into various guilds; they have various ethics, such as not predicting the date of one's own death
- Batman - Issue #683 and #684 of Detective Comics feature the Actuary, a mathematical genius who applies formulae to aid the Penguin in committing crimes.
- Bet Me - by Jennifer Crusie; the main character, Minerva Dobbs, is a thirty-something actuary looking for love
- Un Certain Monsieur Blot - by Pierre Daninos; Mr. Blot is an actuary, who wins a competition as the most average man in France; the book includes the acerbic observation that “there were two kinds of actuaries – those who were still doing actuarial work and those who had found something better to do”
- The Colour of Magic and The Light Fantastic are part of Terry Pratchett's Discworld fantasy series and feature Twoflower, the "actuary and world's first tourist"
- The Foundation Trilogy - by Isaac Asimov features "psycho-historians," a sort of hidden priesthood that manipulates politics and economics on a galactic scale to accomplish the goals of peace and prosperity. Part of the theory is that on a planetary scale, people are not predictable but on a galactic scale, the law of large numbers (i.e., the Central Limit Theorem) is valid and therefore, the reactions of the galactic civilization, as a whole, are predictable. Given the characteristics of psycho-historians, they are very much like actuaries.
- The Good Soldier Švejk - Lieutenant Pelikán is "a mathematician in an insurance firm"
- "Hunted Down" - short story by Charles Dickens with an actuary, Mr. Meltham of the Inestimable Life Assurance Company, as its hero
- Industrial Magic - by Kelley Armstrong; character Reuben Aldrich is the head of the actuarial department at a supernatural organisation; he may also be a necromancer
- Mrs. Warren's Profession - "I shall set up in chambers in the City and work at actuarial calculations and conveyancing," says Vivie, the daughter of the eponymous heroine of George Bernard Shaw's play
- Preferred Risk - by Frederik Pohl and Lester del Rey (under the pseudonym Edson McCann); describes a dystopian future dominated by the insurance industry; in Pohl's own words, "the one novel I wrote with Lester del Rey, which was called Preferred Risk, took a year out of my life. It's a terrible book. If you come across it, don't read it."
- The Rabbit Factor - by Antti Tuomainen; describes the actuary Henri Kosinen who inherits an adventure park. A humorous crime fiction novel.
- The Year of the Jackpot - short story by Robert A. Heinlein; the male protagonist is a former actuary whose analysis of current events leads him to a disturbing conclusion about the fate of the world.
- The Chronicles of Elantra - a series of books by Michelle West; when investigations into a government official occur it is referenced that the Hawks (the police force) have not got the actuaries involved.

== Manga ==
- Homunculus - by Hideo Yamamoto; features Susumu Nakoshi as the story's protagonist, who was an actuary before he told people he was going on an extended vacation; instead, he lives in an old car; he resigns later in the story, and his reason for throwing his job away is still unknown
- Kurosagi Corpse Delivery Service - features a malevolent actuary who uses statistics to determine scenarios that will most likely result in the death of particular people

== Television ==
- The Robinsons – Sitcom about a reinsurance actuary, Ed Robinson (played by Martin Freeman), who realises that reinsurance is not his passion and decides to rethink his life.
- A Million Little Things – Gary works for an insurance company as an actuary.
- Kim Possible – Ron Stoppable's father works as an actuary, as revealed in the episode "Odds Man In".
- Poker Face – An actuary (played by John Hodgman) is looking to purchase drugs at a concert but is mistaken for a cop in season 1, episode 4 Rest In Metal.
- Secret Diary of a Call Girl – An actuary (played by Tom Price) visits a call girl after years without sex. He is very shy and gets turned on by making farmyard animal noises.
- Supernatural – In the episode "Season Seven, Time for a Wedding!", Dean Winchester claims he was writing an article for "Actuarial Insider" while investigating the suddenly promoted junior salesman to CEO of an insurance company.
- The Divorce Insurance – Genius actuary Ki-jun sets out to develop a divorce insurance policy with a task force including an underwriter, quant, risk surveyor, loss adjuster, and a former top insurance agent to determine fair premiums.
- The Client List – A masseuse (played by Jennifer Love Hewitt) asks one of her clients "So, what is an actuary?"
- Person of Interest – John Reese pretends to be an actuary during a date with Zoe. She asks what it's like to be an "actuarial".

== Theater ==
- I Love You Because (2006) - musical; major character Diana Bingley is an actuary; she suggests some formula-based "dating rules" to her friend Marcy in the key number "The Actuary Song"

== Other ==
- Angel Hare - web series, where one of the characters - Francis - mentions offhandedly that they're an actuary.
- Society of Actuaries - holds a speculative actuarial fiction contest
- Wordplay - documentary which explores the world of crossword makers and aficionados; makes reference to actuaries as one of three occupations which are particularly adept at crossword solving
