= Ding Dong Merrily on Live =

- Not Going Out episode
- Episode no.: Series 9 Episode 8
- Directed by: Nick Wood
- Written by: Lee Mack and Daniel Peak
- Original air date: 21 December 2018
- Running time: 27 minutes

Guest appearance
- Tom Benedict Knight as Juan

Episode chronology
| ← Previous "Bust Up" | Next → "Parachute" |

"Ding Dong Merrily on Live" is the 70th episode of the British sitcom Not Going Out, originally broadcast on 21 December 2018 as part of the show's ninth series. Written by series creator and lead actor Lee Mack and Daniel Peak and directed by Nick Wood, the Christmas special is the only episode of the show to be broadcast live.

In the episode, husband and wife Lee (Mack) and Lucy (Sally Bretton) put on a Christmas variety show for the benefit of their children's school. Mack wrote the episode to include difficult performances, and it features self-referential humour. He then wished for all episodes of Not Going Out to be live, but instead introduced episodes set in real time.

== Plot ==
Husband and wife Lee (Lee Mack) and Lucy (Sally Bretton) are organising "Ding Dong Merrily on Live", a variety performance to benefit their children's school. After other acts pull out, Lee hires Juan (Tom Benedict Knight), a knife thrower.

When the couple meet Juan, he says that he wants Lucy to be his assistant, and that he has seduced all his previous assistants. Lee's friend Toby (Hugh Dennis) advises him to write false negative reviews of Juan, to put Lucy off. After being convinced that Juan is an incompetent alcoholic, Lucy dismisses him from the show. It turns out that Juan has also been dismissed from a contract on a cruise liner, upsetting his fiancée who is recovering from cancer.

Feeling guilty, Lee invites Juan to the show and hires him again, but Toby walks in and inadvertently reveals that Lee left the false reviews, causing Juan to quit. Lee sends Toby and his wife, Anna (Abigail Cruttenden), on stage to sing "The Elements", which results in the couple singing improvised lyrics and arguing. For the finale, Lee dresses as Juan and throws the knives, with Lucy as his assistant. Later, at home, Lucy pleas for them not to do a live Christmas special again, and Lee proposes that next time will be on ice skates.

== Production ==
In March 2018, while promoting the ninth series of Not Going Out, Mack told Steve Wright of BBC Radio 2 that he was planning a live episode. He said that he used to consider live episodes to be self-indulgent as they did not aid actors' performances. Mack pointed out that as a stand-up comedian he could improvise if he forgot his lines, but factors such as camera and microphone control on a sitcom would complicate that; he revealed that he used hidden notes on set to remember lines. The BBC had broadcast a live episode of Mrs. Brown's Boys in 2016, and a live episode of Inside No. 9 titled "Dead Line" for Halloween in 2018.

Mack was told by producer Jamie Rix that there would have to be a special reason for a live episode, so Mack wrote a script featuring difficult performances, such as Toby and Anna singing "The Elements" with additional verses. Lee juggles eggs, says a tongue twister, and performs the knife-throwing act. Early in the episode, Bretton stutters on a line and Mack gives a self-referential reply while looking at the camera. Fans and critics debated whether this was scripted; the actors said in a 2026 retrospective that Bretton's mistake was genuine and Mack's response was improvised. When Mack is applauded by the audience after reciting a monologue, he breaks the fourth wall and tells the audience that it was written on a cue card.

The three child actors playing Lee and Lucy's children–Finley Southby (Charlie), Max Pattison (Benji) and Francesca Newman (Molly)–were not allowed to act in front of a live studio audience or work late at night, so they did not feature in the episode. The live format permitted the episode to make a topical joke, based on a recent incident in which Jeremy Corbyn was accused of calling Theresa May a "stupid woman" and responded that he had said "stupid people".

== Reception ==
Steve Bennett of Chortle gave a three-star review, finding that despite the potential jeopardy, the episode was acted well and did not appear to be live, apart from the self-references to live performances. He found the recent live episode of Inside No. 9 to be more inventive. Reece Goodall of The Boar considered the live performances to have been perfect, highlighting Dennis and Cruttenden as Toby and Anna.

The episode was watched by 4,840,766 people, making it the 20th most viewed programme of the week, and 7th on BBC One, after episodes of EastEnders and the BBC News at Six.

Mack enjoyed the episode so much that he wanted every future episode of Not Going Out to be broadcast live, which Rix dismissed as impossible. Instead, the series aired more episodes set in real time.
