= Not Going Out =

British TV sitcom

- Title card introduced in 2025
- Genre: Sitcom
- Created by: Lee Mack
- Written by: Lee Mack; Andrew Collins; Daniel Peak; Darin Henry; Neil Webster; Sarah Morgan; Simon Evans; Simon Dean; Paul Karensa; Peter Tilbury; Chris McCausland
- Directed by: Alex Hardcastle; Nick Wood; Ed Bye
- Starring: Lee Mack; Sally Bretton; Tim Vine; Megan Dodds; Miranda Hart; Katy Wix; Deborah Grant; Geoffrey Whitehead; Bobby Ball; Hugh Dennis; Abigail Cruttenden
- Theme music composer: Alex Hardcastle
- Opening theme: "Not Going Out" by Stephen Triffitt
- Composer: Alex Hardcastle
- Country of origin: United Kingdom
- Original language: English
- No. of series: 15
- No. of episodes: 112 (list of episodes)

Production
- Production locations: Teddington Studios; BBC Television Centre; West London Film Studios; BBC Elstree Centre; Pinewood Studios; Elstree Film & TV Studios
- Camera setup: Multi-camera
- Running time: 30 minutes (regular); 45 minutes (specials)
- Production company: Avalon Television

Original release
- Network: BBC One
- Release: 6 October 2006 – present

Related
- The Sketch Show

Not Going Out is a British television sitcom created, written by and starring Lee Mack. It has aired on BBC One since 2006, making it the second-longest-running British sitcom, (Note: By number of series.) behind Last of the Summer Wine (1973–2010).

The show began with Mack as Lee, an unambitious man from Lancashire; Tim Vine as his best friend Tim; and Megan Dodds as Kate, Lee's landlady in the London Docklands and Tim's ex-girlfriend. From the second series, Sally Bretton replaced Dodds as Lucy, Lee's new landlady and Tim's sister. At the end of the seventh series, Lee proposes to and marries Lucy, and from the eighth to thirteenth series, they live in Walton-on-Thames with their three children. As of series 14, the couple live together in a countryside house, and Mack and Bretton are the only two main cast members.

== Production ==
=== Production history ===
Mack said in 2026 that Not Going Out originated with his 1999 Edinburgh Festival Fringe show Lee Mack's Bits, alongside Catherine Tate and Dan Antopolski. The first joke he thought of was that he would be looking through a telescope, and then jolt it upwards when his wife walked in. He came up with around twelve ideas for "The Flat Sketch", and a television pilot was made in 2005. After receiving feedback that it was hard to believe that his and Tate's characters were a couple, he made them tenant and landlady, and came up with the title Not Going Out.

Producers Avalon assigned Andrew Collins to write alongside Mack. While their script for the pilot took a month to make, the pair spent every weekday of the first half of 2006 writing the five other episodes. Mack based his character on his experiences in his mid-20s, when he lived with friends and struggled for a career. The best friend character was initially called Colin, and was a tough man, similar to Tate's character. Tim Vine, who had acted alongside Mack on The Sketch Show, played Colin in the pilot, though the role was not written for him. When the series began, Mack renamed the character Tim and made his personality closer to Vine's own characteristics. Tate was unavailable for the series due to the popularity of The Catherine Tate Show, so Mack cast American actress Megan Dodds due to his love of American sitcoms. After her departure, she was replaced by Sally Bretton as Lucy. Miranda Hart played an acupuncturist in a series 1 episode, and Mack brought her back as cleaner Barbara for the next two series, until her departure for the sitcom Miranda. Katy Wix as Tim's girlfriend Daisy, and Bobby Ball as Lee's father Frank, were first introduced as one-off characters; Mack said that the frequent turnover of the cast meant that he did not introduce characters to be instantly recurring.

Not Going Out was cancelled in 2009 after its third series, but revived in 2011 after an online petition. Vine left after the fifth series in 2012, saying that he wanted a change. His character was written out by going on a work placement to Germany. The supporting characters Toby (Hugh Dennis) and Anna (Abigail Cruttenden) were introduced as replacements; Mack had enjoyed watching Cruttenden on P'tang, Yang, Kipperbang in 1982. The seventh series was pitched to Dennis and Cruttenden as the finale of Not Going Out. Mack felt that the premise of his character being attracted to his landlady but unable to express it was becoming unusual due to the characters' ageing, and the series concluded with Lee proposing to and marrying Lucy.

In May 2013, a British remake of Everybody Loves Raymond, starring Mack and Tate and titled The Smiths, was announced; Mack announced in December that it had been abandoned. Instead of running two sitcoms, Mack decided to convert Not Going Out into a sitcom about a family, like Everybody Loves Raymond. He took advice from the American sitcom's creator Philip Rosenthal to make stories based on real-life experiences and moved the timeline forwards seven years, with Lee and Lucy married and with three children, like the real-life Mack; the setting moved to Walton-on-Thames, near the actor's home. For Christmas 2018, the episode was broadcast live; on a producer's advice, Mack included scenes that would be difficult to perform live, such as having Dennis and Cruttenden perform "The Elements". Having enjoyed the audience interaction in the live episode, Mack wanted the show to always be live, but instead converted it to real time, introducing another timeline jump to Lee and Lucy living in the countryside after their children go to university.

Mack said in 2018 that he once threatened to cancel Not Going Out due to a dispute with the channel Dave, which aired repeats. As a non-drinker, he objected to alcohol being advertised during breaks on the show; the channel eventually met his demands. During the dispute, he turned down a guest appearance on Dave's Red Dwarf, a decision he regretted.

After the death of Ball in 2020, Mack planned a funeral episode for Frank, in which Ball's comedy partner Tommy Cannon would play the priest, as he had in the show's wedding episode in 2014, and mourners would include Ball's contemporaries Syd Little and Freddie Davies. The episode was abandoned because it was too sad, and was replaced by an episode in which Lucy's mother Wendy (Deborah Grant) paints an unflattering portrait of Frank, which Lee tries to hide.

As of 2025, Not Going Out holds the title of the UK's longest-running sitcom currently on air and is second only to Last of the Summer Wine in terms of longevity for prime time sitcoms in the UK. Mack said in 2026 that he would rather the show have irregular Christmas specials, like Gavin & Stacey, than end with a designated finale.

=== Production process ===
Lee Mack and Andrew Collins were the initial writers, with Paul Kerensa, Simon Evans and Daniel Peak joining the team in later series. Mack is the last remaining actor from the original cast, and the only actor to appear in every episode.

Mack said in 2026 that he comes up with episode concepts from real life, such as his trip to an escape room. He would then write a script with Daniel Peak and producer Jamie Rix before the script was passed to five additional writers for jokes. The cast perform public pre-production script read-throughs at the Chiswick Playhouse. Episodes are rehearsed at a Sea Cadet hut in Teddington

Most of each episode was shot on set in front of an audience at Teddington Studios. There are two main sets: the flat/house and the bar/coffee shop that Lee frequently visits. Outdoor shots and real indoor location shots have also been used on occasion. The fourth and fifth series were shot at the BBC Television Centre. The sixth and seventh series saw filming return to Teddington Studios. International distribution is handled by Avalon who also produce the series. From Series 5 onwards, Not Going Out was produced in association with Lee Mack's own company, Arlo Productions (named after his son). The 2015 Christmas special was filmed on location in Wimbledon, in a department store, and was screened in London to record the laugh track. After Teddington Studios closed, series 8 was filmed at BBC Elstree Centre and series 9-14 were filmed at Pinewood Studios. Series 15 commenced recording at Elstree Studios on 27 March 2026. In series 6, for the episode entitled Boat, production visited the Port of Ramsgate in Kent to film part of the episode where Lee's dad, Frank (Bobby Ball), has bought a boat and invites Lee and his friends down to Eastbourne for the weekend. When they arrive, the boat is not what everyone expected.

Collins wrote in 2013 that the use of a laugh track and studio audience was considered unfashionable when the show debuted, due to series such as The Office that avoided them. According to producer Jamie Rix, the laughter may be taken from a first take, and then put over a later take in post-production if the first take had to be cut.

The show is filmed in HDTV and, since series 4, airs simultaneously on BBC One HD. Previous to this, the show was not simulcast on BBC HD, but shown on BBC HD 30 minutes after the BBC One airing.

Mack said in 2026 that he regretted the profanity in early episodes of the series, as he was concerned about swearing on television since becoming a father, and the show only used bleeped profanity "strategically". According to Mack, the BBC interfered to remove partial nudity in a strip club scene in the series 4 episode "Life on Mars Bars", due to the Sachsgate scandal.

For the first series, episodes were written by Mack and Andrew Collins, with members of the cast credited for additional material. Because the eight episodes of the second series had to be written and filmed in a short space of time, Avalon Television brought in Peter Tilbury, Paul Kerensa and Simon Evans to join the writing team. Mack, Collins and Stacey concentrated on writing the main body of the episodes whilst Kerensa and Evans were involved in storylining, rewriting and 'gagging up' the episodes. The third series saw the writing team expanded, with Darin Henry, Daniel Peak, and Simon Dean contributing to the main episodes (all co-written with Mack). The "gag writing" team was also expanded, from two members to as many as eight, not counting the main writers, on a single episode. Milton Jones was among the additional writers of the show.

The theme song is performed by Frank Sinatra impersonator Stephen Triffitt.

The flat in which Lee and Kate/Lucy lived from 2006 to 2015 is No. 17. In a DVD commentary for the first series, it was mentioned that "Number 17" was originally considered as a title for the series, before the name "Not Going Out" was decided upon.

== Synopsis ==
=== Series 1–7: Docklands era ===
Lee is a juvenile and lazy slacker, who goes from one job to another, living off the good graces of his Californian landlady Kate (Megan Dodds), with whom he shares a flat in London. It is not long before they find that their friendship is changing into something more. The situation is somewhat complicated by the fact that Lee's best friend Timothy Gladstone Adams (Tim Vine), an accountant from Henley, is Kate's ex-boyfriend (they broke up when he cheated on her with 23-year-old Emma) and he wants to repair their relationship. Lee is torn between pursuing his romantic feelings for Kate and remaining loyal to his increasingly paranoid best friend.

Kate has gone back to America in series two, leaving Tim with a flat and lodger he cannot afford to keep. Tim's sister Lucy Adams (Sally Bretton), a head hunter recently back from ten years abroad, buys the flat and becomes the new landlady and flatmate to Lee. Tim also hires a cleaner, Barbara (Miranda Hart). During the series, Lucy dates 51-year-old Guy, making Lee envious. In the last episode, Lee believs Lucy has said yes to marrying Guy, but she instead split up with him. In episode 6, Lee meets a ditzy woman called Daisy at speed dating, who later appeared to fall for Tim, and she reappears in the Christmas special as Tim's girlfriend and returns in series three. There was also a Christmas Special which introduced Tim and Lucy's parents – Wendy (Deborah Grant) and Geoffrey (Geoffrey Whitehead).

The third series sees Lee trying to pursue Lucy. Usually encouraged by Barbara, he invariably ends up making things worse for himself. In the last episode, Lucy is about to marry Pavlov, a mechanic, so he can stay in the country. However, Lee gets Barbara to marry Pavlov instead. The Christmas special introduces Lee's negligent father Frank (Bobby Ball) and sees Lucy and Lee kiss under the mistletoe. The fourth series finishes with a near death experience for Lee, who later organises a date with Lucy. The sixth series was the first since the departure of Tim.

The seventh series was filmed from 23 May to 25 July 2014, and aired as ten episodes from 17 October to 24 December 2014, the longest series to date. Hugh Dennis and Abigail Cruttenden joined the cast as new neighbours Toby and Anna, who soon struggle to share a building with Lee and Lucy. In episode 9, Lee finally reveals his love for Lucy and asks her to marry him. She says, "Yes". Episode 10 features their wedding day, with Lee, Frank, and Lucy's dad, Geoffrey all ending up in jail after a drunken stag night. There are guest appearances from Tim Vine (who came back for this episode), and Bobby Ball's comedy partner, Tommy Cannon as the vicar.

In a Christmas Special in 2015, the regular cast were involved in an armed robbery in a department store. Frank was working as an elf in the Christmas department, when Lee, Lucy and Daisy were with Toby and Anna, who had sent their son away over Christmas. The two security guards were attacked by the armed robber who locked them all in the security room, and Lee had a showdown with the armed robber. The episode ended with Lucy giving birth to Charlie, the couple's first child.

=== Series 8–13: Walton-on-Thames era ===
The eighth series, broadcast in 2017, is set seven years after the events of the 2015 Christmas special, and shows how Lee and Lucy cope with being parents to three young children. Its Christmas special featured Lee and Lucy facing a possible yuletide disaster when they discover the perfect present they have bought for their children has already been bought by grandparents.

At a press screening event for series 8 on 14 December 2016, it was confirmed that a ninth and tenth series had been ordered by the BBC. The ninth series of Not Going Out began on 8 March 2018. On 21 December, "Ding Dong Merrily on Live", the first live episode of the show was broadcast. The premise was that Lee and Lucy were organising a Christmas show for their children's school, and involved Toby and Anna beginning Tom Lehrer's Elements, but veering off as they "forgot" it into lists of supposed ideas, and building into a row. Replacing the supposedly offended knife thrower as a finale, Lee threw genuine knives at Lucy – on a rotating wheel for the final one. It was judged a great success with high reviews.

Series 10 began broadcasting on 15 April 2019 on BBC One, moving to Monday nights as opposed to its usual Friday night slot. An eleventh series was announced in 2019 for 2020; however, it was postponed until 2021. A further two series were also announced (Series twelve and thirteen) for 2021 and 2022. The eleventh series was the last series to feature Bobby Ball as Frank following Ball's death in October 2020. A New Year's Eve special aired on 30 December 2020 and the regular series began on 8 January 2021, consisting of five episodes (and a Christmas special on 23 December 2021).

In 2022, Bretton was absent in the episode 'Jury'. This is her only absence from the series since her first appearance in Series 2, Episode 1.

The thirteenth series began airing weekly from 23 June 2023, with all episodes available on iPlayer hours before the first episode aired. Series 13 saw the final appearances of Charlie, Benji, Molly, Geoffrey and Wendy following the time jump in the next series.

=== Series 14–present: Countryside era ===
The show was renewed for a fourteenth series in May 2024. However, prior to this announcement, Mack stated that since the 2023 Christmas special was the 100th episode, he considered bringing the show to an end as he had no plans to work on the series until early 2025.

Series 14 is set 6 years after the 2023 Christmas special with Lee and Lucy moving to a new house in the countryside, as their children are now away at university. The series, also, does not feature Anna, Toby, Geoffrey and Wendy. The fourteenth series began airing weekly from 13 June 2025, same as with the thirteenth series all episodes were made available on BBC iPlayer from 6am on 13 June hours before the first episode aired.

Prior to the fourteenth series airing, the BBC announced that Not Going Out had been renewed for a 6x30 minute fifteenth series set to air in 2026, which has been confirmed to start on 23 September 2026. Series 15 also celebrated the shows 20th anniversary.

== Cast ==
Character	Played by	Series															Episodes
Character	Played by	1	2	3	4	5	6	7	8	9	10	11	12	13	14	15	Episodes
Lee	Lee Mack (Note: Lee is played by Thomas Gater during a flashback to childhood in the episode "Absent Father Christmas".)	Main	Main	Main	Main	Main	Main	Main	Main	Main	Main	Main	Main	Main	Main	Main	112
Timothy Gladstone Adams	Tim Vine	Main	Main	Main	Main	Main		G									35
Kate	Megan Dodds	M															7
Lucy Adams	Sally Bretton (Note: Lucy is played by Ruby Stokes during a flashback to the 1980s in the episode "Debbie".)		Main	Main	Main	Main	Main	Main	Main	Main	Main	Main	Main	Main	Main	Main	103
Barbara	Miranda Hart (Note: Miranda Hart played an acupuncturist in series one.)		Main	Main													15
Daisy	Katy Wix		Recurring	Recurring	Recurring	Main	Main	Main									39
Wendy Adams	Deborah Grant		G	Recurring	Recurring	Recurring	Recurring	Recurring	Main	Main	Main	Main	Main	Main			24
Geoffrey Adams	Timothy West		G	R													3
Geoffrey Adams	Geoffrey Whitehead				Recurring	Recurring	Recurring	Recurring	Main	Main	Main	Main	Main	Main			22
Frank	Bobby Ball			Guest	Guest	Guest	R	R	Main	Main	Main	Main					15
Toby	Hugh Dennis							R	Main	Main	Main	Main	Main	Main		G	34
Anna	Abigail Cruttenden							R	Main	Main	Main	Main	Main	Main		G	27
Guy	Simon Dutton		R					G									6
Charlie	Finley Southby (Note: Newborn Charlie is portrayed by twin babies Millie and Evie Crewe in the episode "Christmas Shopping".)							G	Recurring	Recurring	Recurring	Recurring	Recurring	Recurring			17
Benji	Max Pattison								Recurring	Recurring	Recurring	Recurring	Recurring	Recurring			17
Molly	Francesca Newman								Recurring	Recurring	Recurring	Recurring	Recurring	Recurring			22
Jack	Max Willis								R	R			R				5
Various (Note: Angela McHale has appeared in seven episodes of the show, each time playing a different character.)	Angela McHale	G		G				Guest	Guest	Guest				Guest	Guest		7

== Episodes ==
Series	Episodes	Originally released	
Series	Episodes	First released	Last released
1	6	6 October 2006	10 November 2006
2	8	7 September 2007	21 December 2007
3	8	30 January 2009	23 December 2009
4	6	6 January 2011	10 February 2011
5	6	13 April 2012	18 May 2012
6	9	5 April 2013	24 December 2013
7	11	17 October 2014	24 December 2015
8	8	13 January 2017	24 December 2017
9	8	8 March 2018	21 December 2018
10	9	15 April 2019	24 December 2019
11	6	30 December 2020	5 February 2021
12	7	23 December 2021	29 April 2022
13	8	23 June 2023	24 December 2023
14	6	13 June 2025	19 July 2025
15	6	23 September 2026	29 October 2026

== Home media ==
The series has been released on DVD. Although filmed and broadcast in HD, no Blu-rays have been released to date. All episodes up to the end of Series 4 feature different video post-production to the broadcast versions, giving them a US-style 'filmlook' effect, however this was dropped from the Series 5 DVD onwards. The episodes Movie and Drunk are slightly extended for DVD, featuring shots and lines cut or censored for their original BBC One transmission. Some music tracks are replaced by soundalikes for release.

Title	Release date		Special features
Title	Region 2	Region 4	Special features
Not Going Out: Series One	22 October 2007	13 May 2009	Audio commentary on episodes 1–3 by Lee Mack & producer/director Alex Hardcastle Making Of documentary (including Lee and Tim interviewed on set, exclusive behind the scenes footage of Series Two, and clips from Series One, the pilot and The Sketch Show) (18 mins) Photo gallery
Not Going Out: Series Two	2 February 2009	9 December 2009	Audio commentaries on episodes 1, 4 & 6 Behind the scenes documentary (20 mins)
Not Going Out 3	27 September 2010	4 May 2011	Not Going Out On Location documentary (35 minutes)
Not Going Out 4	14 February 2011	—N/a	Not Going Right – The Out-Takes (35 minutes of bloopers from series 1–4)
Not Going Out 5	21 May 2012	—N/a	Not Going Right – The Out-Takes (25 minutes of bloopers from series 5)
Not Going Out 6	17 November 2014	—N/a	Not Going Right – The Out-Takes (bloopers from series 6)
Not Going Out 7	1 June 2015	—N/a	Behind the Scenes: A Day in the Life of Not Going Out
Additional sets
Not Going Out: Series One & Series Two	2 February 2009	—N/a	See individual releases
Not Going Out: Series One, Two & Three	27 September 2010	—N/a	See individual releases
Not Going Out: Series One, Two, Three & Four	14 November 2011	—N/a	See individual releases
Not Going Out: Series One, Two, Three, Four & Five	21 May 2012	—N/a	See individual releases
Not Going Out: The Christmas Specials	1 December 2014	—N/a	No special features Episodes: Murder at Christmas; Absent Father Christmas; The House
Not Going Out: The Complete Series 1–7	1 June 2015	—N/a	See individual releases
Not Going Out: The Complete Series 1–7 (HMV Exclusive)	22 January 2018	—N/a	See individual releases

- Not Going Out 6 does not include the 2013 Christmas Special, "The House". It is however included on The Christmas Specials and The Complete Series 1–7.

== Reception ==
An early criticism of Not Going Out was that it relied too much on stand-up style gags rather than plot. Co-writer Andrew Collins said that this was deliberate, as Mack and Vine were stand-up comedians. The show's humour of quick-fire jokes has been likened to sitcoms from the 1970s. Mack said that he considers this a compliment, as he sees the decade as the golden age of British comedy. Sam Woolaston of The Guardian wrote in 2017 that "it has survived personnel changes, critical disdain, one assassination attempt [...] it will go on for ever because, ironically, no TV boss is ever again going to dare say it is not going out". The show continued to receive positive reviews for maintaining its style of humour during its run, but received some negative reviews for its change in scenario once Lee married Lucy.
