= About Schmidt =

- Theatrical release poster
- Directed by: Alexander Payne
- Screenplay by: Alexander Payne; Jim Taylor
- Based on: About Schmidt by Louis Begley
- Produced by: Michael Besman; Harry Gittes
- Starring: Jack Nicholson; Hope Davis; Dermot Mulroney; Kathy Bates
- Cinematography: James Glennon
- Edited by: Kevin Tent
- Music by: Rolfe Kent
- Production company: New Line Cinema
- Distributed by: New Line Cinema
- Release dates: May 22, 2002 (Cannes); December 13, 2002 (United States)
- Running time: 124 minutes
- Country: United States
- Language: English
- Budget: $30 million
- Box office: $107.1 million

About Schmidt is a 2002 American comedy drama film co-written and directed by Alexander Payne and starring Jack Nicholson in the title role. The film also stars Hope Davis, Dermot Mulroney, and Kathy Bates. It is loosely based on the 1996 novel of the same name by Louis Begley. After it was released in theaters by New Line Cinema on December 13, 2002, the film enjoyed both critical and commercial success, earning $107.1 million on a $30 million budget.

== Plot ==
Warren Schmidt is retiring from his position as an actuary with Woodmen of the World, a life insurance company in Omaha, Nebraska. He looks with depression at the clock in his office and waits until exactly five to leave with no fanfare. He attends a paint by the numbers retirement dinner where people give generic remarks and empty well wishes. During the dinner, he ducks out and heads to the bar alone, finding it hard to adjust to his new life, feeling useless.

Schmidt sees a television advertisement about a foster program for African children, Childreach, and decides to sponsor a child. He soon receives an information package with a photo of his foster child, a small Tanzanian boy named Ndugu Umbo, to whom he relates his life in a series of letters.

Schmidt visits his young successor at the life insurance company to offer his help, but he is politely declined. As he leaves the building, he sees the contents and files of his office set out for the garbage. He describes to Ndugu his resentment towards his successor, implying that he was forced into retirement against his will. He describes to Ndugu his longtime alienation from Helen, his wife, who dies from a blood clot in her brain just after their purchase of a Winnebago Adventurer motor home.

Jeannie, their daughter, and her fiancé, Randall Hertzel, a waterbed salesman, arrive from Denver. Consoling him at the funeral, she later berates him for taking his wife for granted, refusing to fully pay for the Winnebago, and getting her a cheap casket. He asks her to move back to take care of him, but she refuses. Meanwhile, Randall tries to rope him into a pyramid scheme.

Schmidt feels that his daughter could do better than Randall. After they leave, he is overcome by loneliness. When he discovers hidden love letters disclosing Helen's long-ago affair with Ray, a mutual friend, Schmidt collects all her possessions and dumps them next to a clothing donations bin. He then confronts Ray for his betrayal.

Deciding to take a journey in the new Winnebago to visit his daughter and convince her not to marry Randall, he tells her he is coming early for the wedding. She makes it clear she does not want him there until right before the ceremony, so Schmidt visits places from his past including his college (University of Kansas), his childhood home (now a tire store) and other museums and points of interest.

At a trailer campground, he is invited to dinner by a friendly and sympathetic couple, John and Vicki Rusk. When John goes for beer, Schmidt makes a pass at Vicki, who tells him to leave. He attempts to call Ray and repair their relationship, but his voicemail is deleted during the call and he decides to let it go. Sitting on the roof of his RV on a starry night, Schmidt forgives his departed wife for her affair, apologizing to her for his own failings. At that moment, he is amazed to see a meteor streak across the sky, taking it as a possible sign from Helen.

Feeling full of purpose and energetic renewal, Schmidt arrives in Denver, where he stays at the home of Roberta, Randall's mother. He is appalled by her eccentric, lower-middle-class family and cannot dissuade Jeannie from the marriage. Schmidt throws out his back after sleeping on Randall's waterbed, infuriating Jeannie. Roberta assures him that a soak in her hot tub will help his back, but he flees after she makes a pass at him in the tub. The next day, Schmidt, exhausted from a restless night, attends the wedding and delivers a kind speech at the reception, hiding his disapproval.

On his way home, Schmidt composes a letter to Ndugu. He questions his life's accomplishments, lamenting that he will soon be dead, that his life has made no difference to anyone, and that eventually it will be as if he has never existed.

A pile of mail is waiting for him at home. Schmidt opens a letter from Tanzania. It is from a nun, who writes that Ndugu is six and unable to read and reply to Schmidt's letters on his own but appreciates them and Schmidt's financial support. An enclosed crayon drawing, of Ndugu and Schmidt holding hands on a sunny day, moves Schmidt to tears.

== Cast ==
- Jack Nicholson as Warren R. Schmidt
- Kathy Bates as Roberta Hertzel
- Hope Davis as Jeannie Schmidt
- Dermot Mulroney as Randall Hertzel
- Len Cariou as Ray Nichols
- Howard Hesseman as Larry Hertzel
- June Squibb as Helen Schmidt
- Matt Winston as Gary Nordin, Warren's successor
- Harry Groener as John Rusk
- Connie Ray as Vicki Rusk
- Phil Reeves as Minister in Denver
- James Michael Connor as Randall's Best Man

== Production ==
Alexander Payne's script to About Schmidt was initially an original screenplay written years before Louis Begley's novel was published. According to Payne, his script was about "an old guy who retires, and realizes how much he’s wasted his life, and wants somehow to start anew— The Graduate at age sixty-five." Payne’s original script was titled The Coward. Payne completed the script in 1991 and offered it to Universal Pictures, but the studio rejected it. Following the publication of Begley's novel in 1996, Payne decided to combine his script with the plot of the novel, thus making it an adaptation. Payne made many changes from the book, though Begley commented in an essay in The New York Times that "my most important themes were treated with great intelligence and sensitivity" and felt the movie was "a gem of original filmmaking."

Filming began in March 2001 and took place in several Nebraska cities, including Omaha, Nebraska City, Minden, Kearney, and Lincoln. Omaha was chosen because it was where Payne grew up. At least one scene was filmed in Denver where Jack Nicholson's character is driving in front of the famous Ogden Theater located at 935 E Colfax. Filming concluded in May 2001.

Before agreeing to the nude hot tub scene, Kathy Bates said she hashed out with director Payne exactly what part of her anatomy would be shown and what wouldn't. "I battled to make myself comfortable, and he battled to get what he wanted. We met in the middle."

== Reception ==
=== Box office ===
In the United States, the film grossed $8,533,162 on its opening weekend. Its total U.S. box office gross stands at $65,005,217, while total worldwide gross totals $107,054,484.

=== Critical response ===
About Schmidt drew praise from a number of critics, who singled out the performances of Jack Nicholson and Kathy Bates. Film website Rotten Tomatoes reported an approval rating of 86% based on 203 reviews, with an average rating of 7.71/10. The site's critical consensus reads, "In this funny, touching character study, Nicholson gives one of the best performances of his career." On Metacritic, the film has a weighted average score of 85 out of 100, based on 40 critics, indicating "universal acclaim". Audiences polled by CinemaScore gave the film an average grade of "B" on an A+ to F scale.

Roger Ebert gave About Schmidt three-and-a-half out of four stars and wrote the following for the Chicago Sun-Times: About Schmidt "is essentially a portrait of a man without qualities, baffled by the emotions and needs of others. That Jack Nicholson makes this man so watchable is a tribute not only to his craft, but to his legend: Jack is so unlike Schmidt that his performance generates a certain awe. Another actor might have made the character too tragic or passive or empty, but Nicholson somehow finds within Schmidt a slowly developing hunger, a desire to start living now that the time is almost gone."

Michael Rechtshaffen of The Hollywood Reporter wrote: "It's a commanding Jack Nicholson lead performance that puts it into a sublime league of its own." Paul Clinton of CNN.com wrote: "About Schmidt is undoubtedly one of the finest films of the year. If you're not deeply touched by this movie, check your pulse."

=== Awards and nominations ===
Award	Category	Recipient	Result
75th Academy Awards	Best Actor	Jack Nicholson	Nominated
75th Academy Awards	Best Supporting Actress	Kathy Bates	Nominated
56th British Academy Film Awards	Best Actor	Jack Nicholson	Nominated
60th Golden Globe Awards	Best Motion Picture – Drama		Nominated
60th Golden Globe Awards	Best Director	Alexander Payne	Nominated
60th Golden Globe Awards	Best Screenplay	Alexander Payne and Jim Taylor	Won
60th Golden Globe Awards	Best Actor – Motion Picture Drama	Jack Nicholson	Won
60th Golden Globe Awards	Best Supporting Actress	Kathy Bates	Nominated
7th Satellite Awards	Best Actor – Motion Picture Drama	Jack Nicholson	Nominated
7th Satellite Awards	Best Supporting Actress - Motion Picture Drama	Kathy Bates	Nominated

Upon accepting his Golden Globe for Best Actor in a Drama, Nicholson stated, "I'm a little surprised. I thought we made a comedy."

It was also part of the Official Competition Selection at the 2002 Cannes Film Festival.

== Home media ==
About Schmidt was released on DVD and VHS on June 3, 2003 by New Line Home Entertainment. It was released on Blu-ray for the first time on February 3, 2015.

== See also ==
- Fictional actuaries
