= John Shrapnel =

British actor (1942–2020)

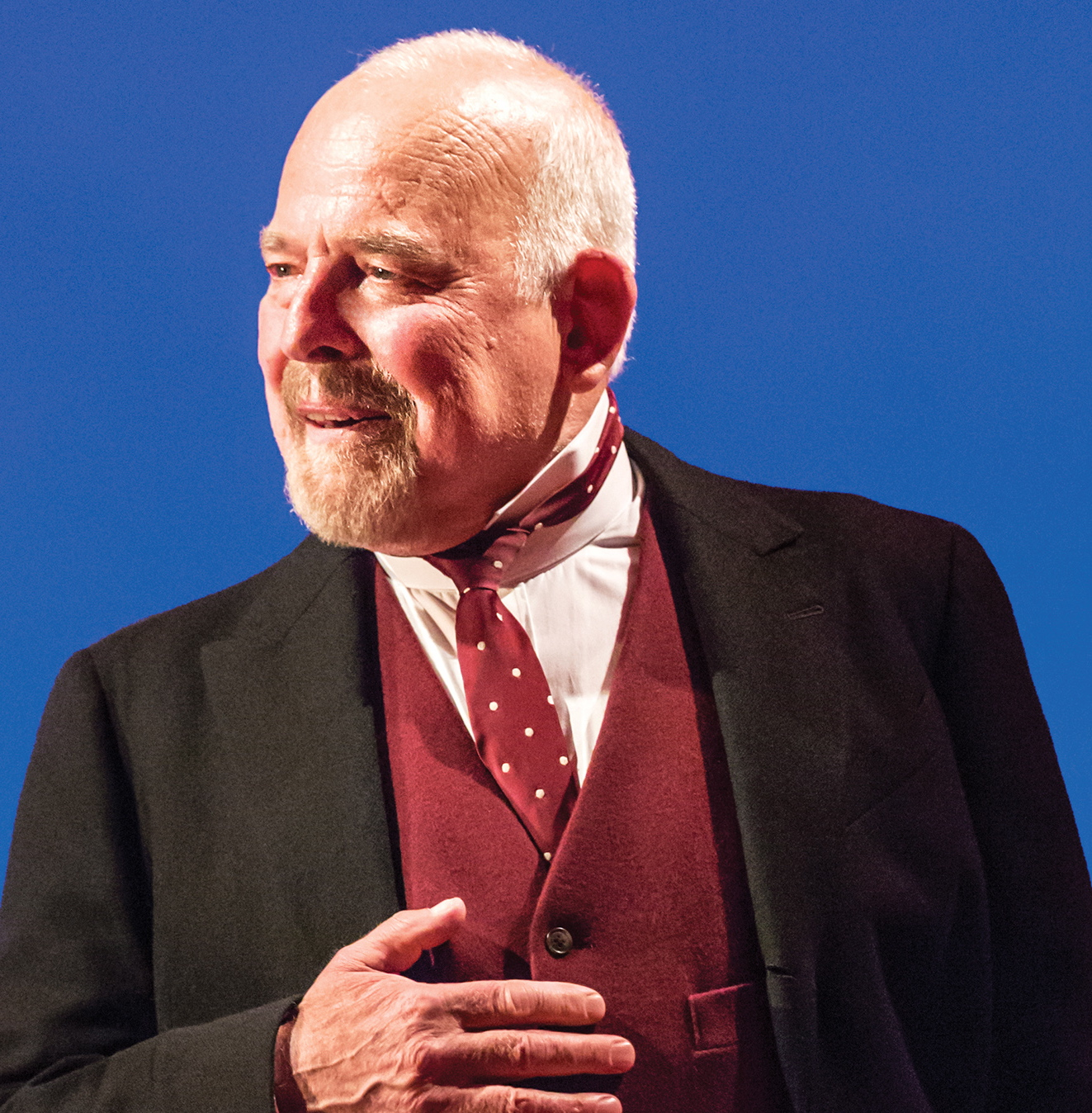
- Born: John Morley Shrapnel; 27 April 1942; Birmingham, Warwickshire, England
- Died: 14 February 2020 (aged 77); Wattisfield, Suffolk, England
- Occupation: Actor
- Years active: 1965–2017
- Spouse: Francesca Ann Bartley (m. 1975)
- Children: 3, including Lex Shrapnel
- Father: Norman Shrapnel

John Morley Shrapnel (27 April 1942 – 14 February 2020) was an English actor. He is known mainly for his stage work with the Royal Shakespeare Company and the National Theatre in the United Kingdom and for his many television appearances. One of his well-known roles was Mr Skinner in the 1996 live-action film 101 Dalmatians.

== Early life ==
Shrapnel was born in Edgbaston, Birmingham, Warwickshire (now West Midlands), on 27 April 1942, the son of journalist and author Norman Shrapnel and Mary Lillian Myfanwy (née Edwards).

Shrapnel was brought up in Stockport and London and was educated first at Mile End School, Stockport, where he started acting as a member of the school's drama society, and then at the City of London School, an independent school for boys in the City of London, where he played Hamlet in the school play; he then attended St Catharine's College, Cambridge, from which he received an MA degree.

== Career ==
Shrapnel began acting professionally on stage in 1965. He was a member of Laurence Olivier's National Theatre Company and the Royal Shakespeare Company and appeared as Sir Oliver Surface in The School for Scandal (directed by Deborah Warner) at the Barbican Centre in 2011. His final stage appearance was in 2015.

Shrapnel also appeared extensively on television from the 1960s onwards. He played the Earl of Sussex in Elizabeth R and Alexander Hardinge in Edward & Mrs. Simpson. He appeared in Z-Cars, Space: 1999, Inspector Morse, GBH, Coogan's Run, Foyle's War and many other dramas. He presented an episode of the 1983 BBC television travel series Great Little Railways. He performed in three of the BBC Television Shakespeare plays and as Creon in the BBC's productions of the Three Theban plays (1986) of Sophocles. He also played Pompey in the second episode of Ancient Rome: The Rise and Fall of an Empire and the Jail Warden in The 10th Kingdom.

His film career included roles in Nicholas and Alexandra (1971), Pope Joan (1972), Hennessy (1975), Personal Services (1987), Testimony (1988), How to Get Ahead in Advertising (1989), England, My England (1995), 101 Dalmatians (1996) as Mr Skinner, Notting Hill (1999), The Body (2001), K-19: The Widowmaker (2002) and Alien Autopsy (2006). He also appeared in historical films such as Gladiator (2000) as Senator Gaius and in Troy (2004) as Nestor. In Elizabeth: The Golden Age (2007) he played Lord Howard and The Duchess (2008) as General Grey.

Shrapnel had the rare distinction of appearing in two episodes of Midsomer Murders as two characters in "Death in Chorus" and "Written in Blood". He appeared in Jonathan Creek episode "The Omega Man" as Professor Lance Graumann. He appeared in Chemical Wedding alongside Simon Callow, telling the tale of the resurrection of occultist Aleister Crowley. He played John Christie (from a 1980s case) in "Solidarity" of Waking the Dead.

He also had experience in the field of BBC radio drama: he played Colin Dexter's Inspector Morse (opposite Robert Glenister as Sgt Lewis) and starred in William Gibson's Neuromancer. Shrapnel played the character Deputy Assistant Commissioner John Felsham in the New Tricks episode The Fourth Man (2010). He also narrated episodes of Wild Discovery.

Shrapnel's final role was as the Archbishop of Canterbury in the 2017 television film King Charles III.

== Personal life and death ==
In 1975, Shrapnel married Francesca Ann Bartley, the younger daughter of Deborah Kerr and Tony Bartley. He and Francesca had three sons: the writer Joe Shrapnel (b. 1976), and the actors Lex Shrapnel (b. 1979) and Tom Shrapnel (b. 1981). His ancestor Henry Shrapnel gave the word shrapnel to the English language.

Shrapnel and his wife divided their time between residences in Highbury, London, and Wattisfield, Suffolk. He died from prostate cancer at his home in Suffolk on 14 February 2020, at the age of 77.

== Filmography ==
=== Film ===
Year	Title	Role	Notes
1971	Nicholas and Alexandra	Petya	
1972	Pope Joan	Father James	
1975	Hennessy	Tipaldi	
1987	Personal Services	Lionel	
1987	Partition	General Flood	
1988	Testimony	Andrei Zhdanov	
1989	How to Get Ahead in Advertising	Psychiatrist	
1995	Two Deaths	Cinca	
1995	England, My England	Samuel Pepys	
1996	101 Dalmatians	Mr. Skinner	
1999	Notting Hill	PR Chief	
2000	Gladiator	Senator Gaius	
2001	The Body	Moshe Cohen	
2002	K-19: The Widowmaker	Admiral Bratyeev	
2004	Troy	Nestor	
2005	The Headsman	Archbishop	
2006	Alien Autopsy	Michael Kuhn	
2007	Sparkle	Bernie	
2007	Elizabeth: The Golden Age	Lord Howard	
2008	Chemical Wedding	Crowley	
2008	Mirrors	Lorenzo Sapelli	
2008	The Duchess	General Grey	
2011	The Awakening	Reverend Hugh Purslow	

=== Television ===
Year	Title	Role	Notes
1967–1969	Playhouse	Jamie / Schoner	2 episodes
1970	Omnibus	Léopold Zborowski	1 episode
1971	Elizabeth R	Earl of Sussex	3 episodes
1972	The Organization	John Wimbourne	1 episode
1974	Crown Court	John Claudius	1 episode
1974	Justice	Roger Anderson	1 episode
1975	Space: 1999	Captain Jack Tanner	1 episode
1976	Z-Cars	George Stonehouse	1 episode
1977	The Three Hostages	Gaudian	Television film
1978	Edward & Mrs. Simpson	Major Alexander Hardinge	Miniseries, 5 episodes
1980	Armchair Thriller	Vincent Craig	6 episodes
1981	Private Schulz	German Newsreel Reader	3 episodes
1982	The Woman in White	Sir Percival Glyde	5 episodes
1983	My Cousin Rachel	Ambrose Ashley	4 episodes
1983–1984	Wagner	Semper	Miniseries, 3 episodes
1984	Horizon	Cyril Burt	1 episode
1984	Sorrell and Son	Thomas Roland	Miniseries, 6 episodes
1985	Mr. Palfrey of Westminster	Adrian Vyner	1 episode
1985–1995	Screen Two	Various	3 episodes
1986	Oedipus the King	Creon	BBC-TV
1987	Vanity Fair	Lord Steyne	5 episodes
1989	About Face	Donald	1 episode
1989	Blackeyes	Detective Blake	Miniseries, 3 episodes
1990	Centrepoint	Claude Wareing	Miniseries, 4 episodes
1990	The Tragedy of Flight 103: The Inside Story	BKA Police Chief	Television film
1991	Young Catherine	Archimandrite Todorsky	Television film
1991	G.B.H.	Dr. Jacobs	Miniseries, 3 episodes
1991	Selling Hitler	Gerd Schulte-Hillen	Miniseries, 4 episodes
1992	The Good Guys	Jerry Rushbridge	1 episode
1992	Between the Lines	D.A.C. Dunning	Main cast, 6 episodes
1993	Crime Story	Roy Hall	1 episode
1994	The Chief	Dan Cheyney	1 episode
1994	Fatherland	Obergruppenführer Odilo Globocnik	Television film
1995	Kavanagh QC	Mr. Justice Griffin	1 episode
1995	Coogan's Run	Douglas Crown	1 episode
1996	Wycliffe	Dr. Sam Malvern	1 episode
1996–1997	Bodyguards	Commander Alan MacIntyre	Main cast, 7 episodes
1997	Inspector Morse	Dr. Julian Storrs	1 episode
1998–2006	Midsomer Murders	Max Jennings / Leo Clarke	2 episodes: "Written in Blood" & "Death in Chorus"
1998	Invasion: Earth	Air Marshal Bentley	Miniseries, 3 episodes
1999	Mary, Mother of Jesus	Simon	Television film
1999	Jonathan Creek	Professor Lance Graumann	1 episode
1999	Hornblower	General François de Charette	1 episode, "The Frogs and the Lobsters"
2000	The 10th Kingdom	Governor of Prison	Miniseries, 3 episodes
2001	The Gentleman Thief	Monty Sinclair	Television film
2002	Foyle's War	Raymond Brooks	1 episode: "A Lesson in Murder"
2003	Spine Chillers	Nick	1 episode
2004	I Am Not an Animal	Narrator	Voice, Miniseries, 6 episodes
2006	Ancient Rome: The Rise and Fall of an Empire	Pompey	Miniseries, 1 episode: "Caesar"
2007	The Last Detective	Billy Palmer	1 episode
2007	The Inspector Lynley Mysteries	Sergeant Mike McCaffrey	1 episode: "Limbo"
2008	The Palace	PM Edward Shaw	Recurring role, 4 episodes
2008	Apparitions	Cardinal Bukovak	Miniseries, 5 episodes
2010	New Tricks	DAC John Felsham	1 episode
2011	Waking the Dead	John Christie	2 episodes: "Solidarity"
2012	Merlin	The Sarrum	1 episode
2017	King Charles III	Archbishop of Canterbury	Television film
