= Centrepoint (TV series) =

- Genre: Thriller
- Written by: Nigel Williams
- Directed by: Piers Haggard
- Starring: Jonathan Firth; Murray Head; Cheryl Campbell; Bob Peck; John Shrapnel; Abigail Cruttenden
- Country of origin: United Kingdom
- Original language: English
- No. of series: 1
- No. of episodes: 4

Production
- Producers: Franco Rosso; Joanna Smith
- Running time: 60 minutes
- Production companies: Channel Four Films; Rosso Productions

Original release
- Network: Channel 4
- Release: 8 October – 29 October 1990

Centrepoint is a four-part British television thriller, written by Nigel Williams and directed by Piers Haggard, first broadcast on Channel 4 on 8 October 1990. The series, which loosely retells the story of Hamlet, is set in London's Docklands at the time of its commercial development, and stars Jonathan Firth as Roland Wareing, whose father Nick has been missing for several years, presumed dead. However, when a mysterious telephone caller suggests that Nick may not be dead after all, Roland sets out to discover the truth behind the disappearance.

The series initially broadcast at 10:00pm on Mondays for four consecutive weeks between 8 and 29 October 1990, although was later re-edited from four episodes into two and rebroadcast on 9 and 16 May 1992. The series was described by Broadcast magazine as “an expensive fiasco in which ambition far outstretched ability”, and was listed among the worst programmes ever broadcast on Channel 4 in a press pack issued to celebrate the channel's 20th Anniversary in 2002. Subsequently, the series remains commercially unreleased on either VHS or DVD.

== Cast ==
- Jonathan Firth as Roland Wareing
- Murray Head as Nick Wareing
- Cheryl Campbell as Maria Wareing
- Bob Peck as Armstrong
- John Shrapnel as Claud Wareing
- Abigail Cruttenden as Saskia
- Veronica Quilligan as Lulu
- Sian Ellis as Roland Wareing (Baby)
- David Stevenson as Roland Wareing (Age 10)
- Derrick O'Connor as Dum Dum
- Patrick Fierry as Ralph
- Jennifer Bryce as Claudia
- Joanna Clarke as Harriet
- Adrian Dunbar as Brown
- Phillip Dogham as Guido
- Roger McKern as Katangai

== Episodes ==
No.	Title	Directed by	Written by	Original release date
1	"Episode 1"	Piers Haggard	Nigel Williams	8 October 1990
Roland Wearing lives with his mother, Maria, and his uncle, Claud. Roland's father and Claud's brother, Nick, has been dead for 10 years. But mysterious phone calls and the appearance of Nick's friend Dum Dum, suggest the radical young man of the 1968 Paris student revolt might not have laid down his gun after all.
2	"Episode 2"	Piers Haggard	Nigel Williams	15 October 1990
Roland and Saskia investigate the car crash that supposedly killed Roland's father in 1979 and witness the extraordinary arrival of an uninvited guest at the wedding of his mother and uncle.
3	"Episode 3"	Piers Haggard	Nigel Williams	22 October 1990
Roland is at last re-united with his father Nick, and he agrees to help nail his uncle, Claud, and his Mother maria for betraying Nick. The spectre of Armstrong looms large as Roland and Saskia discover that he somehow links the events of 1968 to 1989.
4	"Episode 4"	Piers Haggard	Nigel Williams	29 October 1990
Armstrong and Nick urge Roland to get Claud off Armstrong's back. While Roland discovers more about the past, for Dum Dum the dream of peace and love is over. It ends with a confrontation between father and son.
