= The Robinsons =

2005 British TV sitcom

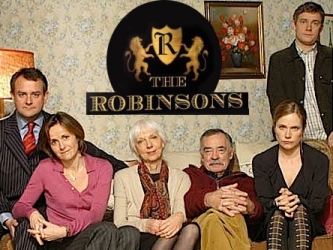
- The Robinsons
- Created by: Mark Bussell; Justin Sbresni
- Written by: Mark Bussell; Justin Sbresni
- Directed by: Mark Bussell; Justin Sbresni
- Starring: Martin Freeman; Hugh Bonneville; Abigail Cruttenden
- Composer: Nina Humphreys
- Country of origin: United Kingdom
- Original language: English
- No. of series: 1
- No. of episodes: 6

Production
- Executive producers: Michelle Buck (Granada); Jon Plowman (BBC)
- Producers: Mark Bussell; Justin Sbresni
- Running time: 29 mins approx.
- Production companies: Busby Productions; Granada Television

Original release
- Network: BBC Two
- Release: 5 May – 9 June 2005

The Robinsons is a British comedy television series that debuted on BBC Two on 5 May 2005. The show's central character is a divorced reinsurance actuary, Ed Robinson (played by Martin Freeman), who realises that reinsurance is not his passion and decides to rethink his life. The series is written and directed by Mark Bussell and Justin Sbresni. The show's executive producers include Jon Plowman and Michele Buck.

== Plot ==
The Robinsons revolves around Ed Robinson's relationship with his family, including his bickering parents (Anna Massey and Richard Johnson), his successful older brother George (Hugh Bonneville) and his perfectionist sister Vicky (Abigail Cruttenden). After he is fired from his long-term job, Ed moves in with his aunt, who is never shown, and tries to find both a career that he prefers to the reinsurance business and a steady girlfriend. His family's efforts to meddle in his affairs further complicate his life.

== Cast ==
- Martin Freeman as Ed Robinson
- Hugh Bonneville as George Robinson
- Abigail Cruttenden as Vicky Robinson
- Anna Massey as Pam Robinson
- Richard Johnson as Hector Robinson
- Amanda Root as Maggie Robinson
- Jamie Hawkins-Dady as Albert Robinson
- Olivia Colman as Connie
  - Jadie Rose Hobson as Young Connie

== Episode list ==
| No. | Title | Directed by | Written by | Original release date |
|---|---|---|---|---|
| 1 | "Episode 1" | Mark Bussell & Justin Sbresni | Mark Bussell & Justin Sbresni | 5 May 2005 |
After he is fired from his job Ed Robinson decides to rethink his life. He moves into a small flat owned by his aunt and decides to start on a new career path that does not involve reinsurance or insurance. Meanwhile, his brother George tries to withstand the stress of a children's birthday party and Vicky thinks she has finally met the man of her dreams.
| 2 | "Episode 2" | Mark Bussell & Justin Sbresni | Mark Bussell & Justin Sbresni | 12 May 2005 |
Ed struggles to perform well during job interviews while Vicky tries to break up with her overly sensitive boyfriend Peter (Anthony Calf). Meanwhile, George has no idea how to explain the concept of death to his young son Albert.
| 3 | "Episode 3" | Mark Bussell & Justin Sbresni | Mark Bussell & Justin Sbresni | 19 May 2005 |
Ed is horrified when his mother sets him on a blind date with his boyhood nemesis Connie (Olivia Colman) and Vicky dates a gynaecologist (Roger Allam) who is attracted to her blunt honesty. George worries that Albert is not aggressive enough and tries to get him interested in rugby.
| 4 | "Episode 4" | Mark Bussell & Justin Sbresni | Mark Bussell & Justin Sbresni | 26 May 2005 |
Ed falls for his new neighbour Zara (Elizabeth Marmur), but she seems more enamoured of his family. George tries to compete with another man for his son's affections and Vicki is determined to date an older man despite having father issues.
| 5 | "Episode 5" | Mark Bussell & Justin Sbresni | Mark Bussell & Justin Sbresni | 2 June 2005 |
Vicky decides to become a mother and tries to convince her gay co-worker Leo (Benedict Sandiford) to be the father. George uses his knowledge as an efficiency expert to help Albert make friends, and Ed becomes convinced that he is a failure.
| 6 | "Episode 6" | Mark Bussell & Justin Sbresni | Mark Bussell & Justin Sbresni | 9 June 2005 |
Ed's birthday becomes awkward when his parents invite two different girls to the same event. George finally gets a coveted promotion, but is frustrated when no one seems to care. His mother pressures him into giving the reluctant Ed a job in his company and Vicky continues her search for a suitable sperm donor.

== See also ==
- Fictional actuaries
