= Norman Shrapnel =

British journalist (1912–2004)

Norman Shrapnel (5 October 1912 – 1 February 2004) was an English journalist, author, and parliamentary correspondent.

== Biography ==
Shrapnel was born in Grimsby, Lincolnshire, and was educated at The King's School, Grantham. In 1947, after war service in the RAF, he joined the Manchester Guardian as reporter, book reviewer, and theatre critic. He became the paper's (and the later Guardian's) parliamentary correspondent in 1958, succeeding Harry Boardman, a post he held until 1975. In 1969 he won the first Political Writer of the Year award.

He wrote books on history and politics (The Performers: Politics as Theatre 1978, and The Seventies), and on topography (A View of the Thames 1977, and his Shrapnel's British Isles series, documenting places such as the Isle of Ely and the Isle of Axholme). For The Bluffer’s Guides, he wrote Bluff Your Way in Politics. Shrapnel broadcast on the BBC World Service, presenting British social and political life.

He married Mary Lillian Myfanwy Edwards in 1940, and had two sons – the stage actor John Shrapnel and composer Hugh Shrapnel. He died aged 91 at Far Oakridge, Gloucestershire, in 2004.
