= The Billion Dollar Bubble =

1976 film

- Written by: Tom Clarke
- Directed by: Brian Gibson
- Starring: Sam Wanamaker; James Woods; Christopher Guest
- Country of origin: United Kingdom
- Original language: English

Production
- Producer: Tom Clarke
- Cinematography: Peter Hall
- Editors: Peter Goodchild; David Martin
- Running time: 60 minutes

Original release
- Release: June 8, 1978

The Billion Dollar Bubble is a 1976 film made for the BBC series Horizon and directed by Brian Gibson about the story of the two-billion-dollar insurance embezzlement scheme involving Equity Funding Corporation of America. The movie stars James Woods in the role of the actuary. It was broadcast in Britain on 8 November 1976. It was aired in America on NBC in prime time on June 8, 1978.

== Plot ==
Temporarily unable to obtain current figures for their upcoming business report, Art Lewis and others in the insurance department of Equity Funding devise a plan to fabricate figures that total the company's expected performance for that year. When the company does not perform as well as expected, Art and others decide to create fake insurance policies to generate the necessary figures to match the expected performance, a provisional measure that is only intended to last a short time.

To sustain the company's growth, more policies must be continually created. Art enlists the aid of technician Al Green to develop computer software that randomly generates policies, the details of which must then be manually filled out. Computer and human error lead to supposed policyholders filing claims for medical conditions of the opposite sex and bills being returned because the addressees are unknown. The company manages to deceive individual auditors and the management offers Art more stock in the company and higher pay as enticement to continue the charade, knowing that he has been looking to move up in the company.

Eventually, the state insurance commissioners intervene, and many of the key players are sent to prison.

== Cast ==
- James Woods as Art Lewis - Sentenced to a minimum of 2 years in prison
- William Hootkins as Lloyd Edens - Sentenced to a minimum of 2 years in prison
- Shane Rimmer as Fred Levin - Sentenced to 5 years in prison
- Sam Wanamaker as Stanley Goldblum - Sentenced to 8 years in prison
- Christopher Guest as Al Green - Sentenced to 3 months in prison
- Lionel Murton as Joe Taubkin - Received a suspended sentence

== See also ==
- Fictional actuaries
