= Abigail Cruttenden =

English actress

- Born: Abigail Lucy Cruttenden; 23 March 1968 (age 58); Richmond, London, England
- Occupation: Actress
- Years active: 1980–present
- Spouses: Sean Bean (m. 1997; div. 2000); Jonathan R. Fraser (m. 2003)
- Children: 2
- Relatives: Hal Cruttenden (brother)

Abigail Lucy Cruttenden (born 23 March 1968) is an English actress. After beginning her career as a child actress, she went on to play opposite Sean Bean, her first husband, as his character Richard Sharpe's wife Jane in several episodes of the TV series Sharpe. She has since become known for her roles in sitcoms, which include Kate Weedon in the ITV comedy series Benidorm (2007–2009) and Anna in the BBC sitcom Not Going Out (2014–2026).

== Early life ==
Cruttenden was born on 23 March 1968 in Richmond, London to a family with history in the acting industry. Her grandmother, Cynthia Coatts (1915–2013) founded the Rosslyn School of Dance and Drama in London, while her mother, Julia (née Coats; 1938–2013), ran the stage make-up school Greasepaint in London. Her father, Neville Cruttenden (1940–1990), was an advertising executive who also indulged in amateur theatrics before deciding to become a professional actor at 49. Her brother is Hal Cruttenden, a stand-up comedian, and she has an older sister Hannah, who works in journalism.

== Career ==
Cruttenden started her acting career when she was 12, appearing in the BBC2 Playhouse episode "Elizabeth Alone" in 1981. She gained significant notice in only her second screen role in the critically acclaimed TV film P'tang, Yang, Kipperbang, playing the object of affection to a lovesick schoolboy in the coming of age drama, which was written by Jack Rosenthal. As she recalled in a newspaper interview in 1996, she did not realise she would have to kiss co-star John Albasiny towards the film's climax. "I was 14 and painfully shy, like my character. I vividly remember them saying we had to kiss at the end. I was completely thrown because it wasn't in the script. Tears welled in my eyes and I mumbled 'All right, then.' But I had never kissed anyone before, ever. It was all rather traumatic."

She continued to have regular acting work throughout her teenage years, including a regular role in the TV sitcom Mog (1985–86), the TV Aids drama Intimate Contact (1987) and The StoryTeller episode "Hans My Hedgehog" in 1987. Despite coming from a family involved in the acting industry, her parents were keen for her to concentrate more on her schooling. By this point, Cruttenden was thoroughly committed to acting, and when she was offered the stage role in Romeo and Juliet halfway through sitting for the last two of her four A levels, she took the role.

Cruttenden immersed herself in her acting work, taking roles in TV shows TECX, Coasting and Centrepoint (all 1990), and appearing in the detective series Van der Valk and The Casebook of Sherlock Holmes in 1991.

After a break from TV to do more theatre work, she appeared on screen for the first time in three years in the TV period comedy drama Love on a Branch Line in 1994, a role which required her to appear nude. Then in 1996 she was cast as Jane Gibbons in the TV series Sharpe as the love interest and eventual wife of Richard Sharpe, played by Sean Bean.

She continued regular work in the theatre and on television, with roles in Doctors and Nurses (2004) and The Robinsons (2005), but it was not until she was cast in the TV sitcom Benidorm in 2007 that she gained another hit show. She appeared in the first three series until she left the show in 2009.

There was a dearth of screen roles for the next 5 years, with only an appearance in an episode of the sitcom The Royal Bodyguard in 2012 during this time. From 2014 to 2023, she was a regular on the sitcom Not Going Out, playing the role of Anna, Hugh Dennis' wife and snobby neighbour to Lee and Lucy.

== Personal life ==
In 1990, Cruttenden's father, Neville, died suddenly of a stomach haemorrhage, aged 50. He had left his job as an advertising executive the year before to become a professional actor, and had had two TV roles in the pipeline before his death.

During the filming of Sharpe, Cruttenden met actor Sean Bean. They married on 22 November 1997. Their daughter was born in November 1998. They divorced in July 2000. In 2003, she married Jonathan R. Fraser. They have a daughter.

Cruttenden lives in East Sheen, south-west London.

== Filmography ==
=== Television ===
Year	Title	Role	Notes
1981	BBC2 Playhouse	Young Elizabeth	Episode: "Elizabeth Alone"
1983	Storyboard	Emma	Episode: "Lytton's Diary"
1985–1986	Mog	Miranda	
1987	The Storyteller	The Princess	Episode: "Hans My Hedgehog"
1987	Intimate Contact	Nell Gregory	
1988	The Bell-Run	Gudrun Glover	TV movie
1989	Agatha Christie's Poirot	Geraldine Oglander	
1990	Coasting	Emma Conway	Episode: "Illuminations"
1990	Centrepoint	Saskia	TV mini-series
1990	TECX	Marijke Van Der Broeke	Episode: "Rock a Buy Baby"
1991	Van der Valk	Else	Episode: "A Sudden Silence"
1991	The Casebook of Sherlock Holmes	Miss Violet Merville	Episode: "The Illustrious Client"
1994	Performance	Clara Browning	Episode: "A Message for Posterity"
1994	Love on a Branch Line	Belinda Flamborough	
1996	Sharpe's Regiment	Jane Gibbons	
1996	Sharpe's Siege	Jane Sharpe née Gibbons	
1996	Sharpe's Mission	Jane Sharpe	
1997	Jane Eyre	Blanche Ingram	TV film adaptation
1997	Sharpe's Revenge	Jane Sharpe	
1997	Sharpe's Justice	Jane Sharpe	
1997	Sharpe's Waterloo	Jane Sharpe	
1997	The Ruth Rendell Mysteries	Annabel Lynes	Episode: "Bribery & Corruption"
1997	Into the Blue	Heather Mallender	
1998	The Canterbury Tales	Emily	Voice
2000	Anna Karenina	Betsy	"Part 1", "Part 3"
2000	Monarch of the Glen	Lizzie MacDonald	Episodes "1.5", "1.8"
2002	Helen West	Emily Eliot	Episode: "A Clear Conscience"
2003	Rosemary & Thyme	Patsy Connolly	Episode: "Arabica and the Early Spider"
2004	Doctors and Nurses	Lucy Potter	6 episodes
2005	The Robinsons	Vicky Robinson	Episode: "1.6"
2007–2009	Benidorm	Kate Weedon	Regular role, 17 episodes (series 1–3)
2007	Foyle's War	Evelyn Richards	Episode: "Casualties of War"
2007	The Commander	Judy Thornton	Episode: "The Devil You Know"
2007	Sex, the City and Me	Ali	TV movie
2008	Teenage Kicks	Kate	Episode: "Sex"
2009	The Green Green Grass	Doctor	Episode: "I Done It My Way"
2012	The Royal Bodyguard	Mary Town-Jones	Episode: "The Perils of Attraction"
2014–2026	Not Going Out	Anna	Regular role
2015	The Outcast	Anne Rawlins	TV mini-series
2015	Citizen Khan	Virginia	Episode: "Farley Manor"
2016	Fresh Meat	Oregon's Mother	Episode: "4.6"
2017	Midsomer Murders	Nell Fryer	Episode: "Death by Persuasion"
2017	Casualty	Sadie Holm	Episode: "32.11"
2020	Housebound	Abigail	Episode: "1.10"
2021	Face It	Abbey	TV Mini Series
2024	Showtrial	Dr Nesbitt	Episode 2.5: "The Smaller Picture"; TV mini-series

=== Film ===
Year	Title	Role
1982	P'tang, Yang, Kipperbang	Ann Lawton
1998	Hideous Kinky	Charlotte
2001	Charlotte Gray	Daisy
2001	Sword of Honour	Kerstie Kilbannock
2014	The Theory of Everything	Isobel Hawking
2015	The Batsman and the Ballerina	Jane
2016	Denial	Janine Stone
2018	Await Further Instructions	Beth
2020	That Girl, Peugeot	Sandra
2021	Munich – The Edge of War	Anne Chamberlain

=== Radio ===
Years	Title	Role
2017–2022	Alone	Ellie

=== Theatre ===
- The Seagull by Anton Chekhov (2013) – Arkadina
- Her Naked Skin by Rebecca Lenkiewicz (2018) – Celia Cain
- A Man for All Seasons by Robert Bolt (2025) – Alice More
- Ragdoll by Katherine Moar (2025) – Holly (Jermyn Street Theatre)
- The Misanthrope by Molière (2026) – Claire (National Theatre)
- Cranford by Elizabeth Gaskell (2026) – Deborah Jenkyns / Lady Glenmire (Orange Tree Theatre)
