= Angela McHale =

English actress (born 1969)

- Born: Angela Jane McHale; 26 February 1969 (age 56); London, England
- Occupations: Actress, comedian
- Years active: 1995–present

Angela Jane McHale (born 26 February 1969) is an English actress and comedian, particularly well known for her variety of British television roles including roles in Not Going Out, The Catherine Tate Show and Grange Hill. She is married with two sons.

== Career ==
Angela Jane McHale was born on 26 February 1969 and attended St Anne's convent school for girls in Ealing, London and St Benedict's School, Ealing for 6th form. She then went to Warwick University to read Politics and discovered her vocation. Following her degree she studied acting at the Drama Studio London gaining a distinction. Her most high-profile work has been with comedians Catherine Tate and Lee Mack.

She then later guest-starred in close friends' Tate and Mack's TV shows, The Catherine Tate Show (all 3 series) and Not Going Out. She has appeared in the latter eight times, each time playing a different guest role. She has also been in Miranda (written by and starring Miranda Hart) and The Bill. She has appeared in Doctors, Casualty, Coronation Street, Eastenders and Summer of Rockets.

== Filmography ==
=== Film ===
| Year | Title | Role | Notes |
|---|---|---|---|
| 2006 | Corpse | Lydia | Short film |
| 2019 | Mothering | Helen | Short film |

=== Television ===
| Year | Title | Role | Notes |
|---|---|---|---|
| 1995 | Tears Before Bedtime | Interview Nanny | Episode 1 |
| 2000 | Without Motive | Tamsin Smart | Episode 6: "A Rattled Man" |
| 2001 | Grange Hill | PC Wendy Gibbon | Series 24; episodes 11, 16–18 & 20 |
| 2001 | Murder in Mind | DS Catherine Harrison | Series 1; episode 3: "Motive" |
| 2003 | Casualty | Sue | Series 18; episode 14: "Christmas Spirit" |
| 2004–2006 | The Catherine Tate Show | Various characters | Series 1–3; 12 episodes |
| 2005 | Bad Girls | Nurse | Series 7; episode 7 |
| 2006 | Snuff Box | (unknown) | Mini-series; episode 3: "Punchline" |
| 2006 | EastEnders | Midwife | 1 episode |
| 2006–2025 | Not Going Out | Clown Instructor; Lola; Nurse; Sat Nav (voice); Mum 1 Care Worker; A.I. Doll's Voice | Series 1; episode 1: "Serious"; Series 3; episode 3: "Amy"; Series 7; episode 3: "Donor"; Series 8; episode 3: "Car"; Series 9; episode 6: "Lollipop Man"; Series 13; episode 8: "Wilfred"; Series 14; episode 2: "Doll" |
| 2007 | Angelo's | Angela | Episode 4 |
| 2009 | Doctors | Rebecca Fisher | Series 10: episode 190: "O True Apothecary" |
| 2009 | Miranda | Customer | Series 1; episode 3: "Job" |
| 2010 | The Bill | Carole Coombes | Series 26; episode 23: "Solace" |
| 2011 | Coronation Street | Christine | 2 episodes |
| 2011 | Doctors | Nicola Jeffries | Series 13; episode 107: "Reality Check" |
| 2014 | Edge of Heaven | Jemima Hadley-Hawthorne | Episode 3 |
| 2019 | Summer of Rockets | Head Warden | Mini-series; episode 2 |
