= P'tang, Yang, Kipperbang =

1982 British television film directed by Michael Apted

- Title card
- Written by: Jack Rosenthal
- Directed by: Michael Apted
- Starring: John Albasiny; Abigail Cruttenden; Maurice Dee; Alison Steadman; Frances Ruffelle; Robert Urquhart
- Music by: David Earl
- Country of origin: United Kingdom
- Original language: English

Production
- Producers: David Puttnam; Chris Griffin; David Bill
- Cinematography: Tony Pierce-Roberts
- Editor: John Shirley
- Running time: 80 minutes (UK); 85 minutes (U.S.)
- Budget: £395,000

Original release
- Release: 3 November 1982

P'tang, Yang, Kipperbang, also released as Kipperbang, is a British television film first shown on Channel 4 on its second night, 3 November 1982.

Written by Jack Rosenthal as part of the First Love series, it is a coming-of-age film set in a grammar school in the outer London suburbs of the late forties (1948). The film was directed by Michael Apted, known for the UK TV documentary series 7 Up. It is the story of Alan Duckworth (John Albasiny), a young cricket-obsessed boy, and his first kiss with Ann Lawton (Abigail Cruttenden). Alan's thoughts are voiced by real life BBC Radio cricket commentator John Arlott in the style of a match commentary. The title phrase comes from a password used by members of Alan's gang.

== Plot ==
Alan Duckworth (known as 'Quack Quack' to his friends) is a socially awkward fourteen-year-old who is obsessed with cricket and Ann Lawton, a girl in his class. Alan daydreams throughout his day (often with a voiceover by cricket commentator John Arlott), showing up late for school and making little academic progress. He is friendly with the groundsman Tommy (Garry Cooper), whom he views as a hero, to Tommy's embarrassment. Alan often follows Tommy around, telling him how Tommy helped to win the war, while making predictions about what the post-war world will be like. Among other things, Alan predicts that there will be no more wars, everyone will speak Esperanto and everyone, regardless of race or creed, will have a teasmade.

Meanwhile, Miss Land (Alison Steadman) is worried she is pregnant with Tommy's baby, something that would result in her having to resign from her job as an English teacher. She is also dealing with her headmaster's interest in her, a hangover from an apparent affair during the war. When Miss Land and Tommy celebrate what turns out to be a false alarm, they realise they are attracted to each other after all. Later however, police show up at the school and Tommy finds himself under arrest. It is revealed that the stories he has told Alan about fighting at Dunkirk, El Alamein, the Battle of the Bulge and Burma are untrue: he deserted from the army three weeks after being called up.

While his friends are all interested in talking about sex, which Alan refers to as 'the other thing', he is privately obsessed about kissing Ann Lawton. Ann is not well regarded by Alan's friends, since she is very strait-laced. She also appears to be romantically interested in another boy. Alan sees a golden opportunity when Miss Land casts him and Ann together in a school play where in the final scene they have to kiss.

== Cast ==
- John Albasiny – Alan Duckworth
- Abigail Cruttenden – Ann Lawton
- Maurice Dee – Geoffrey Whitaker
- Alison Steadman – Miss Land
- Frances Ruffelle – Eunice
- Robert Urquhart – Headmaster
- Garry Cooper – Tommy
- Mark Brailsford – Abbo
- Chris Karallis – Shaz
- Maurice O'Connell – Gym Teacher
- Tim Seeley – French Master
- Richenda Carey – Botany Teacher
- Peter Dean – Police Officer
- Eric Richard – Road Worker

Playing a minor role as a schoolboy was future comedian Dominic Holland in his first TV appearance.

== Filming ==
Filming took place at Wimbledon Chase Middle School (later known as Wimbledon Chase Primary School) and in the surrounding area. The scenes of the boys playing cricket are on the banks of the River Wandle opposite the old Liberty of London print site (now Merton Abbey Mills) – if you look closely in the background during these scenes you can see the chimneys of the now demolished Merton Board Mills.

Credits for the film also thank Cardinal Vaughan School.

== Box office ==
Goldcrest Films invested £378,000 in the film and received £749,000 earning them a profit of £371,000.
