= Sally Bretton =

British actress

- Born: Sally Davis; 23 April 1980 (age 46)
- Education: Royal Central School of Speech and Drama
- Occupation: Actress
- Years active: 1987, 1990, 2000–present
- Spouse: Lee
- Children: 3

Sally Davis (born 23 April 1980), known professionally as Sally Bretton, is an English actress. She is best known for appearing as Lucy Adams in the long-running BBC television sitcom Not Going Out since 2007, and as Martha Lloyd in the BBC crime drama Death in Paradise between 2016 and 2017, a role she has reprised in the spin-off, Beyond Paradise, since 2023.

Other roles include Donna in The Office in 2001, Cat Durnford in Absolute Power in 2003, and Kim Alabaster in Green Wing between 2004 and 2006.

== Early life and education ==
Bretton trained in London at the Central School of Speech and Drama, and worked, part time, as a drama teacher at Top Hat Stage and Screen School during her time at speech and drama school from which she graduated in 1999. She chose the professional name Bretton as her birth name was already registered, by another, with actors' union Equity.

== Career ==
=== Film ===
In Sean Lock: Rogue Landlord, in 2011, Bretton appeared with Sean Lock and Oliver Chris (whom she had previously appeared with in the Green Wing sitcom between 2004 and 2006). The short film was part of a Shelter campaign bringing attention to the problem of questionable landlords and their tactics.

=== Television ===
Bretton has appeared as Lucy Adams in the BBC television sitcom Not Going Out from 2007. She also featured in the TV programmes Absolute Power, Green Wing, and The Office.

She played Martha Lloyd in the BBC crime drama Death in Paradise between 2016 and 2017, and from 2023 has reprised the role in the spin-off, Beyond Paradise.

=== Theatre ===
On stage, she played Goneril in Shakespeare's King Lear at Shakespeare's Globe in 2008.

Bretton has made a number of appearances in the theatre. "An Ideal Husband" in 2018 was broadcast from London to cinemas across the country. It was also recorded as a film and is available to view, in the UK, through MarqueeTV (part of Prime Video).

== Personal life ==
Bretton and her husband, Lee, a photographer, have three daughters, including twins. As of March 2025, they lived in Hertfordshire.

== Filmography ==
=== Film ===
Year	Title	Role	Notes
2000	Peaches	Amy	Feature film
2001	Goodbye Charlie Bright	Susan	Feature film
2007	Outlaw	Kelly	Feature film
2007	A Fitting Tribute	Tammy	Short film Edinburgh International Film Festival Official Selection
2009	Jubilee	Skinny Mum	Short film
2011	The Last Temptation of William Shaw	Emily	Short film
2011	Sean Lock: Rogue Landlord	Mother	Short film
2018	Hassan's Tower	Sarah	Short film
2020	Swan	Donna	Short film

=== Television ===
Year	Title	Role	Notes
1987	Napoleon and Josephine: A Love Story	Hortense de Beauharnais as Child	Mini-series; episodes 1 & 2: "Part I" & "Part II". Credited as Sally Davis
1990	Screen One	Jenny	Series 2; episode 5: "Can You Hear Me Thinking?". Credited as Sally Davis
2000	Sunburn	Lisa	Series 2; episode 4: "Unexpected Love and Golf"
2000	Harry Enfield's Brand Spanking New Show	Various roles	Episodes 1 & 2
2001	Harry Enfield Presents Tim Nice-But-Dim's Guide to Being a Bloody Nice Bloke	Big Brother – Nun	Television film
2001	Beast	Girl in Pub (Carly)	Series 2; episode 1: "Cow"
2001	Harry Enfield Presents Wayne and Waynetta's Guide to Wedded Bliss	Teacher	Television film
2001	The Armstrong and Miller Show	Emma	Series 4; episode 1
2001	Doctors	Chrissie Devonish	Series 2; episode 105: "Passive Resistance"
2001	The Office	Donna	Series 1; episodes 2–6
2001	Dr. Terrible's House of Horrible	Carmina	Episode 1: "Lesbian Vampire Lovers of Lust"
2001	Night & Day	Lisa	Series 1; episodes 4–9
2002	Happy Together	Debi	Television film
2003	Blue Murder	Grassmere	Series 1; episode 1: "Cry Me a River: Part 1"
2003–2005	Absolute Power	Cat Durnford	Main role; series 1 & 2; 12 episodes
2004	Wild West	Victoria	Series 2; episode 5: "The Film Crew"
2004	If...	Dr. Sally Price	Series 2; episode 2: "If... We Could Stop the Violence"
2004–2006	Green Wing	Kim Alabaster	Series 1 & 2; 18 episodes
2005	Blessed	Mary Hathaway	Episodes 1–8
2005	Open Wide	Karen	Television film
2006	The Bill	Dee Collier	Series 22; episodes 5 & 6
2006	Blackbeard: Terror at Sea	Mary Ormond	Television film
2006	Snuff Box	Pretty Lady Walking Dog	Mini-series; episode 5: "Love Triangle"
2006	Vincent	Tina	Series 2; episode 3
2007	Casualty	Stevie Thornell	Series 21; episode 31: "Stitch"
2007	Hotel Babylon	Elizabeth Scott	Series 2; episode 6
2007	How Not to Live Your Life	Abby	Pilot episode
2007–present	Not Going Out	Lucy Adams	Main role; 99 episodes
2009	My Family	Cheryl	Series 10; episode: "2039: A Christmas Oddity"
2010	Lewis	Eve Rigby	Series 4; episode 3: "Your Sudden Death Question"
2011	Casualty	Suki Williams	Series 25; episode 36: "A Quiet Life"
2016	Agatha Raisin	Amanda Barton	Series 1; episode 2: "Agatha Raisin and Hell's Bells"
2016–2017	Death in Paradise	Martha Lloyd	Series 5 & 6; 5 episodes
2019	Thanks for the Memories	Sarah	Mini-series; episodes 1 & 2
2023–present	Beyond Paradise	Martha Lloyd	Main role; series 1–4; 27 episodes
2025	The Au Pair	Zoe Dalton	Main role; episodes 1–4

=== Theatre ===
Year	Title	Role	Venue
2002	Hay Fever	Sorel	Oxford Stage Company (UK tour)
2002	Who's Afraid of Virginia Woolf?	Honey	Library Theatre, Manchester
2003	Present Laughter	Daphne	Theatre Royal, Bath (Tour)
2004	All My Sons	Ann Deever	Library Theatre, Manchester
2004	A Conversation	Gail Williams	Royal Exchange, Manchester
2006–2007	In Extremis	Heloise	Shakespeare's Globe, London
2008	King Lear	Goneril	Shakespeare's Globe, London
2018	An Ideal Husband	Lady Chiltern	Vaudeville Theatre, London / Theatre Royal, Bath
2020	Dial M for Murder	Margot Wendice	Yvonne Arnaud Theatre, Guildford

=== Radio ===
Year	Title	Role	Notes	Ref.
2003	Afternoon Play: Seven Floors	Hospital Staff Member		
2010	Drama on 3 – The Carhullan Army	Corky		
2012–2013	Births, Deaths and Marriages	Mary		
2014	Start/Stop	Alice	Series 2	
2015	The Archers – The Ambridge Players – Dead Girls Tell No Tales	Carol Grey / Anne Cullen		

== Awards ==
- Nominated
  - 2002 – Manchester Evening News Theatre Awards – Best Actress (Theatre) – Who's Afraid of Virginia Woolf?
  - 2024 – TV Times Awards – Favourite On-Screen Partnership – Beyond Paradise with Kris Marshall
