= Equity Funding Corporation of America =

1973 insurance fraud scandal

- Company type: Public company
- Industry: Insurance
- Founded: 1960 in Los Angeles, United States
- Defunct: 1973
- Fate: Collapsed after fraud scandal
- Headquarters: Los Angeles, United States
- Area served: United States
- Key people: Stanley Goldblum and Michael Riordan
- Products: Mutual funds and life insurance

Equity Funding Corporation of America was a Los Angeles-based U.S. financial conglomerate that marketed a package of mutual funds and life insurance to private individuals in the 1960s and 70s.

It collapsed in scandal in 1973 after former employee Ronald Secrist and securities analyst Ray Dirks blew the whistle on massive accounting fraud, including a computer system dedicated exclusively to creating and maintaining fictitious insurance policies. Investigation found that from 1964 onward, as many as 100 company employees had engaged in organized deception of investors, auditors, reinsurers and regulatory authorities.

== History ==
Equity Funding was founded in 1960. Its two top officials and shareholders were Stanley Goldblum and Michael Riordan (brother of future Mayor of Los Angeles Richard Riordan), who was killed in January 1969 in a mudslide that destroyed his home in Los Angeles. The company went public in 1964. By 1972, it was one of the ten largest life insurance companies in the United States, as well as the fastest growing one, with (claimed) assets of $500 million.

The company created more than 60,000 bogus life insurance policies that it sold to reinsurance companies for a fee. In order to pay the premiums on the policies, Equity Funding created additional bogus policies that they would also sell. Sometimes they would claim the bogus policyholder died and then receive the death benefits from the reinsurance company.

The company's stock was over $28 per share on March 9, 1973. Insiders began selling large positions of stock beginning March 13. The price dropped; following massive share trading volume on March 26, and the price fell to $14 the next day. NYSE suspended trading.

The company filed for bankruptcy on April 5, 1973. Indictments were served against 22 individuals in November 1973; Stanley Goldblum pled guilty and was sentenced to eight years in prison (of which he served four years) and was fined $20,000. Fred Levin, an executive vice president, was sentenced to seven years. In all, 22 people involved in the fraud either pled guilty or were convicted. Numerous other employees involved in the fraud were never charged.

An important sidelight was the filing of insider trading charges against whistleblower Dirks. The ensuing case of Raymond L. Dirks v. Securities and Exchange Commission went all the way to the U.S. Supreme Court where Dirks was finally acquitted. The case has been termed historic in helping to define insider trading, as well as the treatment of whistleblowers, analysts and the press.

== See also ==
- History of information technology auditing
- The Billion Dollar Bubble - the Equity Funding scandal retold in the form of a movie starring James Woods in the role of the actuary
