= National Board of Review: Top Five International Films =

National Board of Review Award for Top Five International Films
- Awarded for: Top Five International Films
- Country: United States
- Presented by: National Board of Review
- First award: 1929
- Currently held by: All We Imagine as Light – France, India, Netherlands, Luxembourg, Italy; The Girl with the Needle – Denmark, Poland, Sweden; I'm Still Here – Brazil, France; Santosh – United Kingdom, India, Germany, France; Universal Language – Canada
- Website: nationalboardofreview.org

The Top Five International Films (known as Top Five Foreign Language Films prior to 2022) is one of the awards presented annually by the National Board of Review. This category is one of the few awards that is not presented individually but instead as a list of usually five films.

== History ==
The category was first presented in 1929 and its one of two categories for foreign language films alongside the Best Foreign Language Film award.

Initially it was awarded as just as Top Foreign Films therefore including foreign films in English but in 1990 it was modified to only reward films in a foreign language changing the name from Top Foreign Films to Top Foreign Language Films before being changed again to Top International Films in 2022. From 1940 to 1949 the list was not presented at all.

== Winners ==
=== 1920s ===
Year	Film	Director	Country
1929	Arsenal	Alexander Dovzhenko	Soviet Union
1929	October: Ten Days That Shook the World	Grigori Aleksandrov and Sergei Eisenstein	Soviet Union
1929	The Passion of Joan of Arc	Carl Theodor Dreyer	France
1929	Piccadilly	E. A. Dupont	United Kingdom
1929	Homecoming	Joe May	Germany

=== 1930s ===
Year	Film	Director	Country
1930	High Treason	Maurice Elvey	United Kingdom
1930	Two Hearts in Waltz Time	Géza von Bolváry	Germany
1930	Old and New	Grigori Aleksandrov and Sergei Eisenstein	Soviet Union
1930	Soil	Alexander Dovzhenko	Soviet Union
1930	Storm Over Asia	Vsevolod Pudovkin	Soviet Union
1931	The Threepenny Opera	G. W. Pabst	Germany
1931	The Song of Life	Alexis Granowsky	Germany
1931	Under the Roofs of Paris	René Clair	France
1931	Westfront 1918	Georg Wilhelm Pabst	Germany
1932	À Nous la Liberté	René Clair	France
1932	Der Andere	Robert Wiene	Germany
1932	Der Raub der Mona Lisa	Géza von Bolváry	Germany
1932	Zwei Menschen	Erich Waschneck	Germany
1932	The Battle of Gallipolli	Anthony Asquith and Geoffrey Barkas	United Kingdom
1932	Reserved for Ladies	Alexander Korda	United Kingdom
1932	Kameradschaft	G. W. Pabst	Germany, France
1932	Golden Mountains	Sergei Yutkevich	Soviet Union
1932	Road to Life	Nikolai Ekk	Soviet Union
1932	Mädchen in Uniform	Leontine Sagan	Germany
1933	Ivan	Alexander Dovzhenko	Soviet Union
1933	Hertha's Erwachen	Gerhard Lamprecht	Germany
1933	M	Fritz Lang	Germany
1933	Morgenrot	Vernon Sewell and Gustav Ucicky	Germany
1933	Niemandsland	Victor Trivas	Germany
1933	The Private Life of Henry VIII	Alexander Korda	United Kingdom
1933	Rome Express	Walter Forde	United Kingdom
1933	Poil de Carotte	Julien Duvivier	France
1933	Quatorze Juillet	René Clair	France
1933	The Blood of a Poet	Jean Cocteau	France
1934	Man of Aran	Robert J. Flaherty	Ireland
1934	The Blue Light	Leni Riefenstahl	Germany
1934	Catherine the Great	Paul Czinner	United Kingdom
1934	The Constant Nymph	Basil Dean	United Kingdom
1934	Madame Bovary	Jean Renoir	France
1935	Chapaev	Georgi Vasilyev and Sergei Vasilyev	Soviet Union
1935	The New Gulliver	Aleksandr Ptushko	Soviet Union
1935	The Youth of Maxim	Grigori Kozintsev and Leonid Trauberg	Soviet Union
1935	Crime and Punishment	Pierre Chenal	France
1935	Le Dernier Milliardaire	René Clair	France
1935	Maria Chapdelaine	Julien Duvivier	France
1935	La Maternelle	Jean Benoît-Lévy and Marie Epstein	France
1935	The Man Who Knew Too Much	Alfred Hitchcock	United Kingdom
1935	Thunder in the East	Nicolas Farkas	United Kingdom
1935	Peasants	Konstantin Kostich	Czechoslovakia, Romania
1936	The New Earth	Arnold Fanck and Mansaku Itami	Japan, Germany
1936	We are from Kronstadt	Efim Dzigan	Soviet Union
1936	Son of Mongolia	Ilya Trauberg	Soviet Union
1936	The Yellow Cruise	Léon Poirier and André Sauvage	France
1936	Carnival in Flanders	Jacques Feyder	France
1936	Les Misérables	Raymond Bernard	France
1936	The Ghost Goes West	René Clair	United Kingdom
1936	Rembrandt	Alexander Korda	United Kingdom
1936	Nine Days a Queen	Robert Stevenson	United Kingdom
1936	The Secret Agent	Alfred Hitchcock	United Kingdom
1937	Baltic Deputy	Iosif Kheifits and Aleksandr Zarkhi	Soviet Union
1937	Elephant Boy	Robert J. Flaherty and Zoltan Korda	United Kingdom
1937	The Eternal Mask	Werner Hochbaum	Austria, Switzerland
1937	Golgotha	Julien Duvivier	France
1937	The Lower Depths	Jean Renoir	France
1937	Mayerling	Anatole Litvak	France
1937	Jánošík	Martin Frič	Czechoslovakia
1937	The Spanish Earth	Joris Ivens	United States
1937	The Wedding of Palo	Friedrich Dalsheim	Denmark
1938	Ballerina	Jean Benoit-Lévy and Marie Epstein	France
1938	Generals Without Buttons	Yves Robert	France
1938	Grand Illusion	Jean Renoir	France
1938	Un Carnet de Bal	Julien Duvivier	France
1938	Peter the First	Vladimir Petrov	Soviet Union
1938	Professor Mamlock	Herbert Rappaport and Adolf Minkin	Soviet Union
1939	The End of the Day	Julien Duvivier	France
1939	Harvest	Marcel Pagnol	France
1939	Port of Shadows	Marcel Carné	France
1939	Alexander Nevsky	Sergei Eisenstein and Dmitri Vasilyev	Soviet Union
1939	Robert Koch	Hans Steinhoff	Germany

=== 1950s ===
Year	Film	Director	Country
1950	Kind Hearts and Coronets	Robert Hamer	United Kingdom
1950	Tight Little Island	Alexander Mackendrick	United Kingdom
1950	The Third Man	Carol Reed	United Kingdom
1950	Paris 1900	Nicole Védrès	France
1950	The Titan: Story of Michelangelo	Richard Lyford	Germany
1951	The Browning Version	Anthony Asquith	United Kingdom
1951	Kon-Tiki	Thor Heyerdahl	Norway, Sweden
1951	Miracle in Milan	Vittorio De Sica	Italy
1951	Rashomon	Akira Kurosawa	Japan
1951	The River	Jean Renoir	United States
1952	Beauty and the Devil	René Clair	France, Italy
1952	Breaking the Sound Barrier	David Lean	United Kingdom
1952	Ivory Hunter	Harry Watt	United Kingdom
1952	The Man in the White Suit	Alexander Mackendrick	United Kingdom
1952	Forbidden Games	René Clément	France
1953	Strange Deception	Curzio Malaparte	Italy
1953	The Conquest of Everest	George Lowe	United Kingdom
1953	Moulin Rouge	John Hutson	United Kingdom
1953	A Queen is Crowned	Michael Waldman	United Kingdom
1953	The Little World of Don Camillo	Julien Duvivier	Italy, France
1954	The Detective	Robert Hamer	United Kingdom
1954	Genevieve	Henry Cornelius	United Kingdom
1954	The Heart of the Matter	George More O'Ferrall	United Kingdom
1954	The Little Kidnappers	Philip Leacock	United Kingdom
1954	Beauties of the Night	René Clair	France, Italy
1954	Diary of a Country Priest	Robert Bresson	France
1954	Monsieur Hulot's Holiday	Jacques Tati	France
1954	Bread, Love and Dreams	Luigi Comencini	Italy
1954	Gate of Hell	Teinosuke Kinugasa	Japan
1954	Romeo and Juliet	Renato Castellani	United Kingdom, Italy
1955	Diabolique	Henri-Georges Clouzot	France
1955	The Divided Heart	Charles Crichton	United Kingdom
1955	The Prisoner	Peter Glenville	United Kingdom
1955	The Great Adventure	Arne Sucksdorff	Sweden
1955	The End of the Affair	Edward Dmytryk	United Kingdom, United States
1956	Rififi	Jules Dassin	France
1956	The Silent World	Jacques Cousteau and Louis Malle	France
1956	War and Peace	King Vidor	United States, Italy
1956	Richard III	Laurence Olivier	United Kingdom
1956	La Strada	Federico Fellini	Italy
1957	Gervaise	René Clément	France
1957	A Man Escaped	Robert Bresson	France
1957	The Red Balloon	Albert Lamorisse	France
1957	Ordet	Carl Theodor Dreyer	Denmark
1957	Torero!	Carlos Velo	Mexico
1958	The Horse's Mouth	Ronald Neame	United Kingdom
1958	A Night to Remember	Roy Ward Baker	United Kingdom
1958	Mon Oncle	Jacques Tati	France
1958	Rouge et Noir	Claude Autant-Lara	France
1958	Pather Panchali	Satyajit Ray	India
1959	Wild Strawberries	Ingmar Bergman	Sweden
1959	The Roof	Vittorio De Sica	Italy
1959	Aparajito	Satyajit Ray	India
1959	Look Back in Anger	Tony Richardson	United Kingdom
1959	Room at the Top	Jack Clayton	United Kingdom

=== 1960s ===
Year	Film	Director	Country
1960	The Angry Silence	Guy Green	United Kingdom
1960	I'm All Right Jack	John Boulting	United Kingdom
1960	General Della Rovere	Roberto Rossellini	Italy
1960	Hiroshima Mon Amour	Alain Resnais	France
1960	The World of Apu	Satyajit Ray	India
1961	The Bridge	Bernhard Wicki	West Germany
1961	La Dolce Vita	Federico Fellini	Italy
1961	Two Women	Vittorio De Sica	Italy
1961	Saturday Night and Sunday Morning	Karel Reisz	United Kingdom
1961	A Summer to Remember	Igor Talankin and Georgiy Daneliya	Soviet Union
1962	Barabbas	Richard Fleischer	Italy
1962	Divorce Italian Style	Pietro Germi	Italy
1962	Through a Glass Darkly	Ingmar Bergman	Sweden
1962	The Naked Island	Kaneto Shindo	Japan
1962	Sundays and Cybele	Serge Bourguignon	France
1963	Winter Light	Ingmar Bergman	Sweden
1963	Any Number Can Win	Henri Verneuil	France
1963	8½	Federico Fellini	Italy
1963	The Four Days of Naples	Nanni Loy	Italy
1963	The Leopard	Luchino Visconti	Italy
1964	Anatomy of a Marriage	André Cayatte	France
1964	World Without Sun	Jacques-Yves Cousteau	France
1964	The Organizer	Mario Monicelli	Italy
1964	Seduced and Abandoned	Pietro Germi	Italy
1964	Yesterday, Today and Tomorrow	Vittorio De Sica	Italy
1965	La Bohème	Franco Zeffirelli	West Germany
1965	Gertrud	Carl Theodor Dreyer	Denmark
1965	Juliet of the Spirits	Federico Fellini	Italy
1965	La Tía Tula	Miguel Picazo	Spain
1965	The Overcoat	Aleksey Batalov	Soviet Union
1966	The Gospel According to St. Matthew	Pier Paolo Pasolini	Italy
1966	A Man and a Woman	Claude Lelouch	France
1966	The Shameless Old Lady	René Allio	France
1966	The Sleeping Car Murders	Costa-Gavras	France
1966	Hamlet	Grigori Kozintsev and Iosif Shapiro	Soviet Union
1967	Africa Addio	Gualtiero Jacopetti and Franco Prosperi	Italy
1967	Elvira Madigan	Bo Widerberg	Sweden
1967	Persona	Ingmar Bergman	Sweden
1967	The Great British Train Robbery	John Olden and Claus Peter Witt	West Germany
1967	The Hunt	Carlos Saura	Spain
1968	Hagbard and Signe	Gabriel Axel	Denmark, Sweden, Iceland
1968	The Bride Wore Black	François Truffaut	France
1968	The Two of Us	Claude Berri	France
1968	Hunger	Henning Carlsen	Denmark, Norway, Sweden
1968	War and Peace	Sergei Bondarchuk	Soviet Union
1969	Ådalen 31	Bo Widerberg	Sweden
1969	Shame	Ingmar Bergman	Sweden
1969	The Damned	Luchino Visconti	Italy
1969	La Femme Infidèle	Claude Chabrol	France
1969	Stolen Kisses	François Truffaut	France

=== 1970s ===
Year	Film	Director	Country
1970	The Confession	Costa-Gavras	France, Italy
1970	This Man Must Die	Claude Chabrol	France, Italy
1970	The Passion of Anna	Ingmar Bergman	Sweden
1970	My Night at Maud's	Éric Rohmer	France
1970	The Wild Child	François Truffaut	France
1971	The Conformist	Bernardo Bertolucci	Italy, France, West Germany
1971	The Clowns	Federico Fellini	Italy
1971	The Garden of the Finzi-Continis	Vittorio De Sica	Italy
1971	Bed and Board	François Truffaut	France, Italy
1971	Claire's Knee	Éric Rohmer	France
1972	The Emigrants	Jan Troell	Sweden
1972	Chloe in the Afternoon	Éric Rohmer	France
1972	The Discreet Charm of the Bourgeoisie	Luis Buñuel	France
1972	The Sorrow and the Pity	Marcel Ophuls	France
1972	Uncle Vanya	Andrey Konchalovskiy	Soviet Union
1973	Alfredo, Alfredo	Pietro Germi	Italy
1973	Cries and Whispers	Ingmar Bergman	Sweden
1973	The New Land	Jan Troell	Sweden
1973	Day for Night	François Truffaut	France
1973	The Tall Blond Man with One Black Shoe	Yves Robert	France
1973	Trafic	Jacques Tati	Italy, France
1974	The Pedestrian	Maximilian Schell	Germany
1974	Amarcord	Federico Fellini	Italy
1974	Lacombe, Lucien	Louis Malle	France
1974	The Phantom of Liberty	Luis Buñuel	Italy, France
1974	Scenes from a Marriage	Ingmar Bergman	Sweden
1975	Swept Away	Lina Wertmüller	Italy
1975	A Brief Vacation	Vittorio De Sica	Italy
1975	The Story of Adele H.	François Truffaut	France
1975	Special Section	Costa-Gavras	France
1975	Stavisky	Alain Resnais	France
1976	Face to Face	Ingmar Bergman	Sweden
1976	The Clockmaker	Bertrand Tavernier	France
1976	Cousin Cousine	Jean-Charles Tacchella	France
1976	Small Change	François Truffaut	France
1976	The Marquise of O	Éric Rohmer	West Germany
1977	The Man Who Loved Women	François Truffaut	France
1977	The American Friend	Wim Wenders	West Germany
1977	Cría Cuervos	Carlos Saura	Spain
1977	A Special Day	Ettore Scola	Italy
1977	That Obscure Object of Desire	Luis Buñuel	France, Spain
1978	Autumn Sonata	Ingmar Bergman	Sweden
1978	Dear Detective	Philippe de Broca	France
1978	Madame Rosa	Moshé Mizrahi	France
1978	Bread and Chocolate	Franco Brusati	Italy
1978	A Slave of Love	Nikita Mikhalkov	Soviet Union
1979	La Cage aux Folles	Édouard Molinaro	France, Italy
1979	The Marriage of Maria Braun	Rainer Werner Fassbinder	West Germany
1979	Nosferatu the Vampyre	Werner Herzog	West Germany
1979	Peppermint Soda	Diane Kurys	France
1979	The Tree of Wooden Clogs	Ermanno Olmi	Italy

=== 1980s ===
Year	Film	Director	Country
1980	Eboli	Francesco Rosi	Italy
1980	From the Life of the Marionettes	Ingmar Bergman	West Germany, Sweden
1980	Kagemusha	Akira Kurosawa	Japan
1980	Knife in the Head	Reinhard Hauff	West Germany
1980	The Tin Drum	Volker Schlöndorff	West Germany
1981	The Boat Is Full	Markus Imhoof	Switzerland
1981	Contract	Krzysztof Zanussi	Poland
1981	The Last Metro	François Truffaut	France
1981	Oblomov	Nikita Mikhalkov	Soviet Union
1981	Pixote	Héctor Babenco	Brazil
1982	Das Boot	Wolfgang Petersen	West Germany
1982	Mephisto	István Szabó	Hungary
1982	Siberiade	Andrei Konchalovsky	Soviet Union
1982	Three Brothers	Francesco Rosi	Italy
1982	Yol	Şerif Gören and Yılmaz Güney	Turkey
1983	The Boat People	Ann Hui	Hong Kong
1983	That Night in Varennes	Ettore Scola	Italy, France
1983	Fanny and Alexander	Ingmar Bergman	Sweden
1983	The Return of Martin Guerre	Daniel Vigne	France
1983	La Traviata	Franco Zeffirelli	Italy
1984	A Love in Germany	Andrzej Wajda	West Germany
1984	The Basileus Quartet	Gabriele Ferzetti	Italy
1984	A Sunday in the Country	Bertrand Tavernier	France
1984	The Fourth Man	Paul Verhoeven	Netherlands
1984	Carmen	Francesco Rosi	France, Italy
1985	The Home and the World	Satyajit Ray	India
1985	La Chèvre	Francis Veber	France
1985	The Official Story	Luis Puenzo	Argentina
1985	Ran	Akira Kurosawa	Japan
1985	When Father Was Away on Business	Emir Kusturica	Yugoslavia
1986	Ginger and Fred	Federico Fellini	Italy
1986	Men...	Doris Dörrie	West Germany
1986	Ménage	Bertrand Blier	France
1986	Miss Mary	María Luisa Bemberg	Argentina
1986	Otello	Franco Zeffirelli	Italy, Netherlands
1987	Au Revoir les Enfants	Louis Malle	France
1987	Dark Eyes	Nikita Mikhalkov	Soviet Union
1987	Jean de Florette and Manon of the Springs	Claude Berri	France
1987	My Life as a Dog	Lasse Hallström	Sweden
1987	Tampopo	Juzo Itami	Japan
1988	Le Grand Chemin	Jean-Loup Hubert	France
1988	Pelle the Conqueror	Bille August	Denmark, Sweden
1988	Salaam Bombay!	Mira Nair	India
1988	A Taxing Woman	Juzo Itami	Japan
1988	Women on the Verge of a Nervous Breakdown	Pedro Almodóvar	Spain
1989	Camille Claudel	Bruno Nuytten	France
1989	Chocolat	Claire Denis	France
1989	La Lectrice	Michel Deville	France
1989	The Little Thief	Claude Miller	France
1989	The Story of Women	Claude Chabrol	France

=== 1990s ===
Year	Film	Director	Country
1990	Cyrano de Bergerac	Jean-Paul Rappeneau	France
1990	Monsieur Hire	Patrice Leconte	France
1990	Jesus of Montreal	Denys Arcand	Canada
1990	The Nasty Girl	Michael Verhoeven	Germany
1990	Tie Me Up! Tie Me Down!	Pedro Almodóvar	Spain
1991	Europa Europa	Agnieszka Holland	Germany
1991	The Vanishing	George Sluizer	Netherlands
1991	La Femme Nikita	Luc Besson	France
1991	My Father's Glory	Yves Robert	France
1991	Toto the Hero	Jaco Van Dormael	Belgium
1992	Indochine	Régis Wargnier	France
1992	Tous les Matins du Monde	Alain Corneau	France
1992	Raise the Red Lantern	Zhang Yimou	China
1992	Mediterraneo	Gabriele Salvatores	Italy
1992	Like Water for Chocolate	Alfonso Arau	Mexico
1993	The Accompanist	Claude Miller	France
1993	Un Cœur en Hiver	Claude Sautet	France
1993	Farewell My Concubine	Chen Kaige	China
1993	The Story of Qiu Ju	Zhang Yimou	China
1993	El Mariachi	Robert Rodriguez	United States
1994	Eat Drink Man Woman	Ang Lee	Taiwan
1994	Queen Margot	Patrice Chéreau	France
1994	Strawberry and Chocolate	Tomás Gutiérrez Alea and Juan Carlos Tabío	Cuba
1994	Three Colours: Red	Krzysztof Kieślowski	Switzerland, France
1994	To Live	Zhang Yimou	China
1995	Farinelli	Gérard Corbiau	Belgium
1995	Lamerica	Gianni Amelio	Italy
1995	Il Postino: The Postman	Michael Radford	Italy
1995	Les Misérables	Claude Lelouch	France
1995	Shanghai Triad	Zhang Yimou	China
1996	Bitter Sugar	Leon Ichaso	Dominican Republic, United States
1996	La Cérémonie	Claude Chabrol	France
1996	Ridicule	Patrice Leconte	France
1996	Les Voleurs	André Téchiné	France
1996	Kolya	Jan Svěrák	Czech Republic
1997	Beaumarchais	Édouard Molinaro	France
1997	Ponette	Jacques Doillon	France
1997	Ma Vie en Rose	Alain Berliner	Belgium
1997	La Promesse	Jean-Pierre Dardenne and Luc Dardenne	Belgium
1997	Shall We Dance?	Masayuki Suo	Japan
1998	Beyond Silence	Caroline Link	Germany
1998	Central Station	Walter Salles	Brazil
1998	Life Is Beautiful	Roberto Benigni	Italy
1998	Men with Guns	John Sayles	United States
1998	The Thief	Pavel Chukhray	Russia
1999	All About My Mother	Pedro Almodóvar	Spain
1999	Cabaret Balkan	Goran Paskaljević	Yugoslavia
1999	The Emperor and the Assassin	Chen Kaige	China
1999	East/West	Régis Wargnier	France
1999	Run Lola Run	Tom Tykwer	Germany

=== 2000s ===
Year	Film	Director	Country
2000	Butterfly	José Luis Cuerda	Spain
2000	Crouching Tiger, Hidden Dragon	Ang Lee	Taiwan
2000	Girl on the Bridge	Patrice Leconte	France
2000	Malèna	Giuseppe Tornatore	Italy
2000	A Time for Drunken Horses	Bahman Ghobadi	Iran
2001	Amores Perros	Alejandro González Iñárritu	Mexico
2001	Amélie	Jean-Pierre Jeunet	France
2001	Behind the Sun	Walter Salles	Brazil
2001	Dark Blue World	Jan Svěrák	Czech Republic
2001	No Man's Land	Danis Tanović	Bosnia and Herzegovina
2002	8 Women	François Ozon	France
2002	The Crime of Padre Amaro	Carlos Carrera	Mexico
2002	City of God	Fernando Meirelles and Kátia Lund	Brazil
2002	Talk to Her	Pedro Almodóvar	Spain
2002	Y tu Mamá También	Alfonso Cuarón	Mexico
2003	Autumn Spring	Vladimír Michálek	Czech Republic
2003	The Barbarian Invasions	Denys Arcand	Canada, France
2003	Best of Youth	Marco Tullio Giordana	Italy
2003	Man on the Train	Patrice Leconte	France
2003	Monsieur Ibrahim	François Dupeyron	France
2004	Bad Education	Pedro Almodóvar	Spain
2004	The Sea Inside	Alejandro Amenábar	Spain
2004	Maria Full of Grace	Joshua Marston	Colombia
2004	The Chorus	Christophe Barratier	France
2004	The Motorcycle Diaries	Walter Salles	Argentina, Brazil, United States, Chile, Peru, United Kingdom, Germany, France
2005	2046	Wong Kar-wai	Hong Kong
2005	Downfall	Oliver Hirschbiegel	Germany, Austria, Italy
2005	Balzac and the Little Chinese Seamstress	Dai Sijie	China, France
2005	Walk on Water	Eytan Fox	Israel
2005	Paradise Now	Hany Abu-Assad	Palestine
2006	Curse of the Golden Flower	Zhang Yimou	China
2006	Pan's Labyrinth	Guillermo del Toro	Spain, Mexico
2006	Days of Glory	Rachid Bouchareb	France
2006	Water	Deepa Mehta	India
2006	Volver	Pedro Almodóvar	Spain
2007	4 Months, 3 Weeks and 2 Days	Cristian Mungiu	Romania
2007	The Band's Visit	Eran Kolirin	Israel, France, United States
2007	The Counterfeiters	Stefan Ruzowitzky	Austria, Germany
2007	La Vie en rose	Olivier Dahan	France, Czech Republic
2007	Lust, Caution	Ang Lee	Taiwan
2008	The Edge of Heaven	Fatih Akın	Germany, Turkey
2008	Let the Right One In	Tomas Alfredson	Sweden
2008	Roman de Gare	Claude Lelouch	France
2008	A Secret	Claude Miller	France
2008	Waltz with Bashir	Ari Folman	Israel
2009	The Maid	Sebastián Silva	Chile
2009	Revanche	Götz Spielmann	Austria
2009	The Song of Sparrows	Majid Majidi	Iran
2009	Three Monkeys	Nuri Bilge Ceylan	Turkey
2009	The White Ribbon	Michael Haneke	Germany

=== 2010s ===
Year	Film	Director	Country
2010	I Am Love	Luca Guadagnino	Italy
2010	Incendies	Denis Villeneuve	Canada
2010	Life, Above All	Oliver Schmitz	South Africa
2010	Soul Kitchen	Fatih Akın	Germany
2010	White Material	Claire Denis	France
2011	13 Assassins	Takashi Miike	Japan
2011	Elite Squad: The Enemy Within	José Padilha	Brazil
2011	Footnote	Joseph Cedar	Israel
2011	Le Havre	Aki Kaurismäki	France
2011	Point Blank	Fred Cavayé	France
2012	Barbara	Christian Petzold	Germany
2012	The Intouchables	Olivier Nakache and Éric Toledano	France
2012	The Kid with a Bike	Jean-Pierre Dardenne and Luc Dardenne	Belgium
2012	No	Pablo Larraín	Chile
2012	War Witch	Kim Nguyen	Canada
2013	Beyond the Hills	Cristian Mungiu	Romania
2013	Gloria	Sebastián Lelio	Chile
2013	The Grandmaster	Wong Kar-wai	Hong Kong, China
2013	A Hijacking	Tobias Lindholm	Denmark
2013	The Hunt	Thomas Vinterberg	Denmark
2014	Force Majeure	Ruben Östlund	Sweden
2014	We Are the Best!	Lukas Moodysson	Sweden
2014	Gett: The Trial of Viviane Amsalem	Ronit Elkabetz and Shlomi Elkabetz	Israel
2014	Leviathan	Andrey Zvyagintsev	Russia
2014	Two Days, One Night	Jean-Pierre Dardenne and Luc Dardenne	Belgium
2015	Goodnight Mommy	Veronika Franz and Severin Fiala	Austria
2015	Mediterranea	Jonas Carpignano	Italy
2015	Phoenix	Christian Petzold	Germany
2015	The Second Mother	Anna Muylaert	Brazil
2015	The Tribe	Myroslav Slaboshpytskiy	Ukraine
2016	Elle	Paul Verhoeven	France
2016	The Handmaiden	Park Chan-wook	South Korea
2016	Neruda	Pablo Larraín	Chile
2016	Julieta	Pedro Almodóvar	Spain
2016	Land of Mine	Martin Zandvliet	Denmark
2017	A Fantastic Woman	Sebastián Lelio	Chile
2017	Frantz	François Ozon	France
2017	Loveless	Andrey Zvyagintsev	Russia
2017	The Square	Ruben Östlund	Sweden
2017	Summer 1993	Carla Simón	Spain
2018	Burning	Lee Chang-dong	South Korea
2018	Custody	Xavier Legrand	France
2018	The Guilty	Gustav Möller	Denmark
2018	Happy as Lazzaro	Alice Rohrwacher	Italy
2018	Shoplifters	Hirokazu Kore-eda	Japan
2019	Atlantics	Mati Diop	France, Senegal
2019	The Invisible Life of Eurídice Gusmão	Karim Aïnouz	Brazil
2019	Pain and Glory	Pedro Almodóvar	Spain
2019	Portrait of a Lady on Fire	Céline Sciamma	France
2019	Transit	Christian Petzold	Germany

=== 2020s ===
Year	Film	Director	Country
2020	Apples	Christos Nikou	Greece
2020	Collective	Alexander Nanau	Romania
2020	Dear Comrades!	Andrei Konchalovsky	Russia
2020	The Mole Agent	Maite Alberdi	Chile
2020	Night of the Kings	Philippe Lacôte	Ivory Coast
2021	Benedetta	Paul Verhoeven	France
2021	Lamb	Valdimar Johannsson	Iceland
2021	Lingui, The Sacred Bonds	Mahamat Saleh Haroun	Chad
2021	Titane	Julia Ducournau	France
2021	The Worst Person in the World	Joachim Trier	Norway
2022	All Quiet on the Western Front	Edward Berger	Germany
2022	Argentina, 1985	Santiago Mitre	Argentina
2022	Decision to Leave	Park Chan-wook	South Korea
2022	EO	Jerzy Skolimowski	Poland
2022	Saint Omer	Alice Diop	France
2023	La chimera	Alice Rohrwacher	Italy, France, Switzerland
2023	Fallen Leaves	Aki Kaurismäki	Finland, Germany
2023	The Teachers' Lounge	İlker Çatak	Germany
2023	Tótem	Lila Avilés	Mexico, Denmark, France
2023	The Zone of Interest	Jonathan Glazer	United Kingdom, Poland, United States
2024	All We Imagine as Light	Payal Kapadia	France, India, Netherlands, Luxembourg, Italy
2024	The Girl with the Needle	Magnus von Horn	Denmark, Poland, Sweden
2024	I'm Still Here	Walter Salles	Brazil, France
2024	Santosh	Sandhya Suri	United Kingdom, India, Germany, France
2024	Universal Language	Matthew Rankin	Canada
2025	Left-Handed Girl	Shih-Ching Tsou	Taiwan
2025	The Love That Remains	Hlynur Pálmason	Iceland
2025	The Secret Agent	Kleber Mendonça Filho	Brazil
2025	Sentimental Value	Joachim Trier	Norway
2025	Sirāt	Oliver Laxe	Spain

== See also ==
- National Board of Review Award for Best Foreign Language Film
- Academy Award for Best Foreign Language Film
