= Jin Fuey Moy =

Chinese American physician

Jin Fuey Moy (Chinese: 梅振魁; romanized as Mei Zhenkui; 1862–1924) was a Chinese-born physician who practiced in the United States. He is best known for his involvement in two cases decided by the Supreme Court of the United States concerning the application of the Harrison Narcotics Tax Act to physicians and the prescribing of morphine.

== Early life and education ==
Moy was born in China in 1862. He immigrated to the United States during the nineteenth century and later studied medicine in the United States.

Moy was the younger brother of the Chinese American activists Moy Jin Kee and Moy Jin Mun. The three brothers became involved in Chinese American religious, political, and community organizations during a period of widespread discrimination and legal restrictions against Chinese immigrants.

In New York City, Moy was involved in missionary work among Chinese immigrants. A contemporary history of New York's Chinatown identified him as a physician and as a former superintendent of a Chinese mission.

== Medical career ==
Moy eventually practiced medicine in Pittsburgh, Pennsylvania. He was registered under the Harrison Narcotics Tax Act, permitting him to dispense or distribute opium and its derivatives in the course of his professional practice.

His prescribing of morphine resulted in repeated federal prosecutions and two cases before the Supreme Court.

== United States v. Jin Fuey Moy (1916) ==
In United States v. Jin Fuey Moy, 241 U.S. 394 (1916), federal prosecutors alleged that Moy had conspired with Willie Martin to enable Martin to possess one dram of morphine sulfate. The indictment alleged that Moy had issued Martin a prescription while knowing that the morphine was intended to supply Martin's dependence on opium rather than for a medicinal purpose.

A federal district court dismissed the indictment. The Supreme Court affirmed the dismissal, holding that the relevant provision of the Harrison Act did not apply to every person possessing a narcotic drug. The statutory language instead referred to the classes of people whom the act required to register.

The decision represented a relatively narrow interpretation of the Harrison Act during the first years after its enactment.

== Jin Fuey Moy v. United States (1920) ==
Moy was subsequently prosecuted for issuing prescriptions for morphine sulfate. The evidence presented at trial indicated that some prescriptions were issued to people who were not previously known to him and who identified themselves as morphine users. According to the Supreme Court's account, some recipients received only superficial examinations or no examination, and the prescriptions called for quantities of between eight and sixteen drams of morphine.

In Jin Fuey Moy v. United States, 254 U.S. 189 (1920), the Supreme Court affirmed Moy's conviction. The Court held that a physician could participate in an unlawful sale by issuing a prescription and that the Harrison Act protected dispensing by a registered physician only when it occurred within the course of professional practice.

The Court concluded that the professional-practice exception did not protect distributions intended merely to satisfy the appetite or craving of a person dependent on narcotic drugs.

== Other activities ==
In 1908, Moy received United States Patent No. 883,558 for an attachment designed for cracking chestnuts.

He was also the foster father of Josephine Augusta Moy, who later performed as the actress and singer Lady Tsen Mei.

== Death ==
Moy died in 1924.

== Legacy ==
The two Supreme Court cases involving Moy formed part of the early legal interpretation of the Harrison Narcotics Tax Act and the development of federal authority over narcotic prescribing.

His life has also been discussed within the history of Chinese immigration and Chinese American resistance to exclusion and discrimination.
