= National Board of Review Award for Best International Film =

Annual film award

The National Board of Review Award for Best International Film (formerly known as Best Foreign Language Film prior to 2022) is one of the annual awards given (since 1934) by the National Board of Review of Motion Pictures.

== Winners ==
=== 1930s ===
Year	Winner	Country	Director(s)
1934	Man of Aran	Ireland	Robert J. Flaherty
1936	Carnival in Flanders (La Kermesse héroïque)	France	Jacques Feyder
1937	The Eternal Mask (Die ewige Maske)	Austria/Switzerland	Werner Hochbaum
1938	Grand Illusion (La Grande Illusion)	France	Jean Renoir
1939	Port of Shadows (Le Quai des brumes)	France	Marcel Carné

=== 1940s ===
Year	Winner	Country	Director(s)
1940	The Baker's Wife (La Femme du Boulanger)	France	Marcel Pagnol
1941	Pepe le Moko	France	Julien Duvivier

=== 1950s ===
Year	Winner	Country	Director(s)
1950	The Titan	West Germany	Robert J. Flaherty, Richard Lyford, and Curt Oertel
1951	Rashomon	Japan	Akira Kurosawa
1952	The Sound Barrier	UK	David Lean
1953	A Queen Is Crowned	UK	Christopher Fry
1954	Romeo and Juliet	UK- Italy	Renato Castellani
1955	The Prisoner	UK	Peter Glenville
1956	The Silent World (Le Monde du silence)	France	Jacques Cousteau & Louis Malle
1957	Ordet	Denmark	Carl Theodor Dreyer
1958	Pather Panchali	India	Satyajit Ray
1959	Wild Strawberries (Smultronstället)	Sweden	Ingmar Bergman

=== 1960s ===
Year	Winner	Country	Director(s)
1960	The World of Apu (Apur Sansar)	India	Satyajit Ray
1961	The Bridge (Die Brücke)	West Germany	Bernhard Wicki
1962	Sundays and Cybele (Les dimanches de Ville d'Avray)	France	Serge Bourguignon
1963	8½	Italy	Federico Fellini
1964	World Without Sun (Le monde sans soleil)	France	Jacques-Yves Cousteau
1965	Juliet of the Spirits (Giulietta degli spiriti)	Italy	Federico Fellini
1966	The Sleeping Car Murders (Compartiment tueurs)	France	Costa-Gavras
1967	Elvira Madigan	Sweden	Bo Widerberg
1968	War and Peace (Voyna i mir)	Soviet Union	Sergei Bondarchuk
1969	Shame (Skammen)	Sweden	Ingmar Bergman

=== 1970s ===
Year	Winner	Country	Director(s)
1970	The Wild Child (L'enfant sauvage)	France	François Truffaut
1971	Claire's Knee (Le genou de Claire)	France	Eric Rohmer
1972	The Sorrow and the Pity (Le chagrin et la pitié)	France	Marcel Ophüls
1973	Cries and Whispers (Viskningar och rop)	Sweden	Ingmar Bergman
1974	Amarcord	Italy	Federico Fellini
1975	The Story of Adele H. (L'histoire d'Adèle H.)	France	François Truffaut
1976	The Marquise of O (Die Marquise von O...)	West Germany	Eric Rohmer
1977	That Obscure Object of Desire (Cet obscur objet du désir)	France	Luis Buñuel
1978	Autumn Sonata (Höstsonaten)	Sweden	Ingmar Bergman
1979	La cage aux folles	France	Edouard Molinaro

=== 1980s ===
Year	Winner	Country	Director(s)
1980	The Tin Drum (Die Blechtrommel)	West Germany	Volker Schlöndorff
1981	Oblomov (Neskolko dney iz zhizni I.I. Oblomova)	Soviet Union	Nikita Mikhalkov
1982	Mephisto	West Germany	István Szabó
1983	Fanny and Alexander (Fanny och Alexander)	Sweden	Ingmar Bergman
1984	A Sunday in the Country (Un dimanche à la campagne)	France	Bertrand Tavernier
1985	Ran	Japan	Akira Kurosawa
1986	Otello	Italy	Franco Zeffirelli
1987	Jean de Florette	France	Claude Berri
1987	Manon of the Spring (Manon des sources)	France	Claude Berri
1988	Women on the Verge of a Nervous Breakdown (Mujeres al borde de un ataque de nervios)	Spain	Pedro Almodóvar
1989	Story of Women (Une affaire de femmes)	France	Claude Chabrol

=== 1990s ===
Year	Winner	Country	Director(s)
1990	Cyrano de Bergerac	France	Jean-Paul Rappeneau
1991	Europa Europa	France/Germany/Poland	Agnieszka Holland
1992	Indochine	France	Régis Wargnier
1993	Farewell My Concubine (Ba wang bie ji)	China/Hong Kong	Chen Kaige
1994	Eat Drink Man Woman (Yin shi nan nu)	Taiwan/USA	Ang Lee
1995	Shanghai Triad (Yao a yao yao dao waipo qiao)	China/France	Zhang Yimou
1996	Ridicule	France	Patrice Leconte
1997	Shall We Dance? (Shall we dansu?)	Japan	Masayuki Suo
1998	Central Station (Central do Brasil)	Brazil	Walter Salles
1999	All About My Mother (Todo sobre mi madre)	Spain	Pedro Almodóvar

=== 2000s ===
Year	Winner	Country	Director(s)
2000	Crouching Tiger, Hidden Dragon (Wo hu cang long)	Taiwan/China/USA/Hong Kong	Ang Lee
2001	Amores perros	Mexico	Alejandro González Iñárritu
2002	Talk to Her (Hable con ella)	Spain	Pedro Almodóvar
2003	The Barbarian Invasions (Les invasions barbares)	Canada/France	Denys Arcand
2004	The Sea Inside (Mar adentro)	Spain	Alejandro Amenábar
2005	Paradise Now (al-Janna al-Laan)	Palestine Authority	Hany Abu-Assad
2006	Volver	Spain	Pedro Almodóvar
2007	The Diving Bell and the Butterfly (Le scaphandre et le papillon)	France/USA	Julian Schnabel
2008	Mongol	Kazakhstan	Sergei Bodrov
2009	A Prophet (Un prophète)	France	Jacques Audiard

=== 2010s ===
Year	Winner	Country	Director(s)
2010	Of Gods and Men (Des hommes et des dieux)	France	Xavier Beauvois
2011	A Separation (Jodâyi-e Nâder az Simin)	Iran	Asghar Farhadi
2012	Amour	Austria	Michael Haneke
2013	The Past	France/Iran	Asghar Farhadi
2014	Wild Tales (Relatos Salvajes)	Argentina/Spain	Damián Szifron
2015	Son of Saul (Saul fia)	Hungary	László Nemes
2016	The Salesman (Forušande)	Iran	Asghar Farhadi
2017	Foxtrot	Israel	Samuel Maoz
2018	Cold War (Zimna wojna)	Poland	Paweł Pawlikowski
2019	Parasite (Gisaengchung)	South Korea	Bong Joon-ho

=== 2020s ===
Year	Winner	Country	Director(s)
2020	La Llorona	Guatemala	Jayro Bustamante
2021	A Hero (Qahremaan)	Iran	Asghar Farhadi
2022	Close	Belgium	Lukas Dhont
2023	Anatomy of a Fall (Anatomie d'une chute)	France	Justine Triet
2024	The Seed of the Sacred Fig (Dāne-ye anjīr-e ma'ābed)	Iran/Germany/France	Mohammad Rasoulof
2025	It Was Just an Accident (Yek tasādof-e sāde)	Iran/France/Luxembourg	Jafar Panahi

== Multiple winners ==
- Ingmar Bergman – 5
- Pedro Almodóvar – 4
- Asghar Farhadi – 4
- Federico Fellini – 3
- Akira Kurosawa – 2
- Ang Lee – 2
- Satyajit Ray – 2
