= 7 Wise Dwarfs =

- Title frame
- Directed by: Richard Lyford
- Story by: Al Bertino; Dick Kinney; Harry Reeves
- Produced by: Walt Disney
- Starring: Pinto Colvig
- Music by: Frank Churchill (reused music from Snow White and the Seven Dwarfs)
- Animation by: Dick Huemer
- Color process: Technicolor
- Production company: Walt Disney Productions
- Distributed by: The National Film Board of Canada; Government of Canada
- Release date: December 12, 1941
- Running time: 3:41
- Countries: Canada; United States
- Language: English

7 Wise Dwarfs (also known as Seven Wise Dwarfs and Walt Disney's 7 Wise Dwarfs) is a 1941 four-minute educational short animated film made by the Walt Disney Studios for Walt Disney Productions, for the National Film Board of Canada. The film was released theatrically on December 12, 1941, as part of a series of four films directed at the Canadian public to learn about war bonds during the Second World War. 7 Wise Dwarfs was directed by Richard Lyford and featured the voice talent of Pinto Colvig as "Doc". (Note: Pinto Colvig had been cast as "Sleepy" and "Grumpy" in the original Snow White film.)

7 Wise Dwarfs features the Seven Dwarfs from Disney's Snow White and the Seven Dwarfs, four years after the characters made their screen debut. Quite a bit of the short consists of reused work from the 1937 Snow White film. The film short, for example, typically shows Dopey doing things in a clumsy, belated and confused fashion for slapstick effect (as in the original film).

== Plot ==
The Seven Dwarfs mining for gemstones, march past Parliament Hill in Ottawa, and then rush to a post office, while Dopey goes to a nearby bank instead when he finds himself locked out, and invest their gems in Canadian War Savings Certificates. All the while, the dwarfs sing a variant of the song "Heigh-Ho" (from the original film).

A pastiche of war scenes follows, each of which ends with a message, usually coincidentally (like letters appearing from cracks made by bullets). The changed lyrics to the song typically talks of investing in the war effort by purchasing war savings certificates, and uses marketing phrases like "Five for Four" (a phrase coined to reflect a long term return of five dollars on every four invested - it is also the name of another short educational film advocating the same cause in Canada during the war).

== Production ==
In 1939, with the outbreak of a global war, Walt Disney Studios felt a great pinch in their finances due to the loss of much of their European markets. This was further limited with the invasion of France by Nazi forces in 1940, which meant that the next Disney release Pinocchio (1940) was only dubbed in Spanish and Portuguese, a great deal less languages than previous Disney works.

Due to this loss of profit, and losses on recent films, Disney studios faced a bleak outlook of a deficit of over half a million dollars, layoffs and pay cuts for the first time in the studio, and a $2.23 million ceiling on their credit allowance. With bleak prospects, the studio was made into a corporation in April 1940, which raised $3.6 million to help pay off debts owed by the studio. To enable his studios to keep afloat and producing films, Walt Disney sought out external funding to cover production costs, which would allow him to keep employees on the payroll and keep the studio working.

On March 3, 1941, Disney invited over three dozen different representatives of various national defence industries to a lunch meeting, in an attempt to solicit work from them. He followed this luncheon with formal letters offering work "for national defence industries at cost, and without profit. In making this offer, I am motivated solely by a desire to help as best I can in the present emergency." Four Methods of Flush Riveting (1941) was first training film that was commissioned by Lockheed Aircraft. (Note: Disney Studios would eventually make 200 wartime training films, predominantly for the United States military.)

In response to Disney's efforts, John Grierson, the head of the National Film Board of Canada entered into a co-production agreement for four animated films to promote the Canadian War Savings Plan. In addition, a training film for the Canadian Army, that eventually became Stop That Tank! (1942) was commissioned.

== Reception ==
While intended for a theatrical audience, 7 Wise Dwarfs, along with the other three films in the series, was effective in delivering its message to Canadians through their local War Savings Committee. When America entered the war, these shorts were later released as part of the eight bond drives in the United States.

== Home media ==
The short was released on May 18, 2004, on Walt Disney Treasures: Walt Disney on the Front Lines.

== See also ==
- List of World War II short films
- Walt Disney's World War II propaganda production
