= 1936 New York Film Critics Circle Awards =

2nd New York Film Critics Circle Awards

2nd New York Film Critics Circle Awards

Announced January 4, 1937
Presented January 24, 1937

Best Picture:
Mr. Deeds Goes to Town

The 2nd New York Film Critics Circle Awards, announced on January 4, 1937, presented on January 24, 1937, honored the best filmmaking of 1936.

The ceremony was held at the Rainbow Room at Rockefeller Center.

== Winners ==
=== Best Picture ===
- Mr. Deeds Goes to Town
- Runners-up – Fury and Dodsworth and Winterset

=== Best Director ===
- Rouben Mamoulian – The Gay Desperado
- Runner-up – William Wyler – These Three and Dodsworth and Fritz Lang - Fury

=== Best Actor ===
- Walter Huston – Dodsworth
- Runner-up – Spencer Tracy – San Francisco and Gary Cooper - Mr. Deeds Goes to Town

=== Best Actress ===
- Luise Rainer – The Great Ziegfeld
- Runner-up – Ruth Chatterton – Dodsworth and Norma Shearer - Romeo and Juliet

=== Best Foreign Film ===
- (France) Carnival in Flanders
- Runner-up – (France) Toni
