= Come and Get It (1929 film) =

1929 film

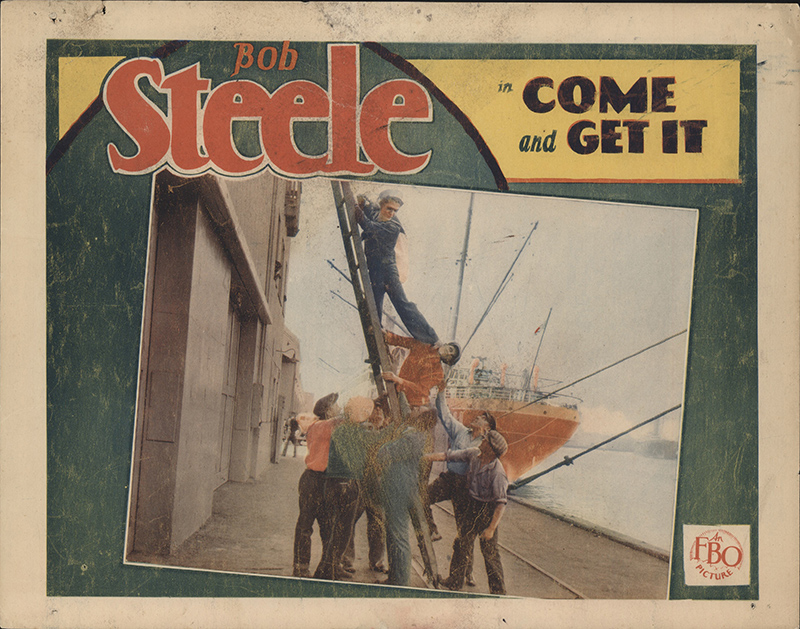
- Directed by: Wallace Fox
- Written by: Frank Howard Clark
- Starring: Bob Steele; James Quinn; Betty Welsh
- Cinematography: Virgil Miller
- Edited by: Della M. King
- Production company: FBO
- Distributed by: FBO
- Release date: February 3, 1929
- Running time: 60 minutes
- Country: United States
- Language: Silent (English intertitles)

Come and Get It is a lost 1929 American silent action film directed by Wallace Fox and starring Bob Steele, James Quinn, and Betty Welsh. Shortly after the film's production, FBO merged into the larger RKO Pictures.

The film was released in Britain by Ideal Films.

== Cast ==
- Bob Steele as Breezy Smith
- James Quinn as Buch Farrel
- Betty Welsh as Jane Elliott
- Jay Morley as Tout Regan
- James B. Leong as Singapore Joe
- Harry O'Connor as Breezy's father
- Marin Sais as Breezy's mother
- William Welsh as Judge Elliott
