= National Board of Review Awards 1964 =

Annual US film awards ceremony

36th National Board of Review Awards

December 22, 1964

The 36th National Board of Review Awards were announced on December 22, 1964.

== Top Ten Films ==
1. Becket
2. My Fair Lady
3. Girl with Green Eyes
4. The World of Henry Orient
5. Zorba the Greek
6. Topkapi
7. The Chalk Garden
8. The Finest Hours
9. Four Days in November
10. Séance on a Wet Afternoon

== Top Foreign Films ==
1. World Without Sun
2. The Organizer
3. Anatomy of a Marriage
4. Seduced and Abandoned
5. Yesterday, Today and Tomorrow

== Winners ==
- Best Film: Becket
- Best Foreign Film: World Without Sun
- Best Actor: Anthony Quinn (Zorba the Greek)
- Best Actress: Kim Stanley (Séance on a Wet Afternoon)
- Best Supporting Actor: Martin Balsam (The Carpetbaggers)
- Best Supporting Actress: Edith Evans (The Chalk Garden)
- Best Director: Desmond Davis (Girl with Green Eyes)
