= James B. Leong =

Chinese actor (1889-1967)

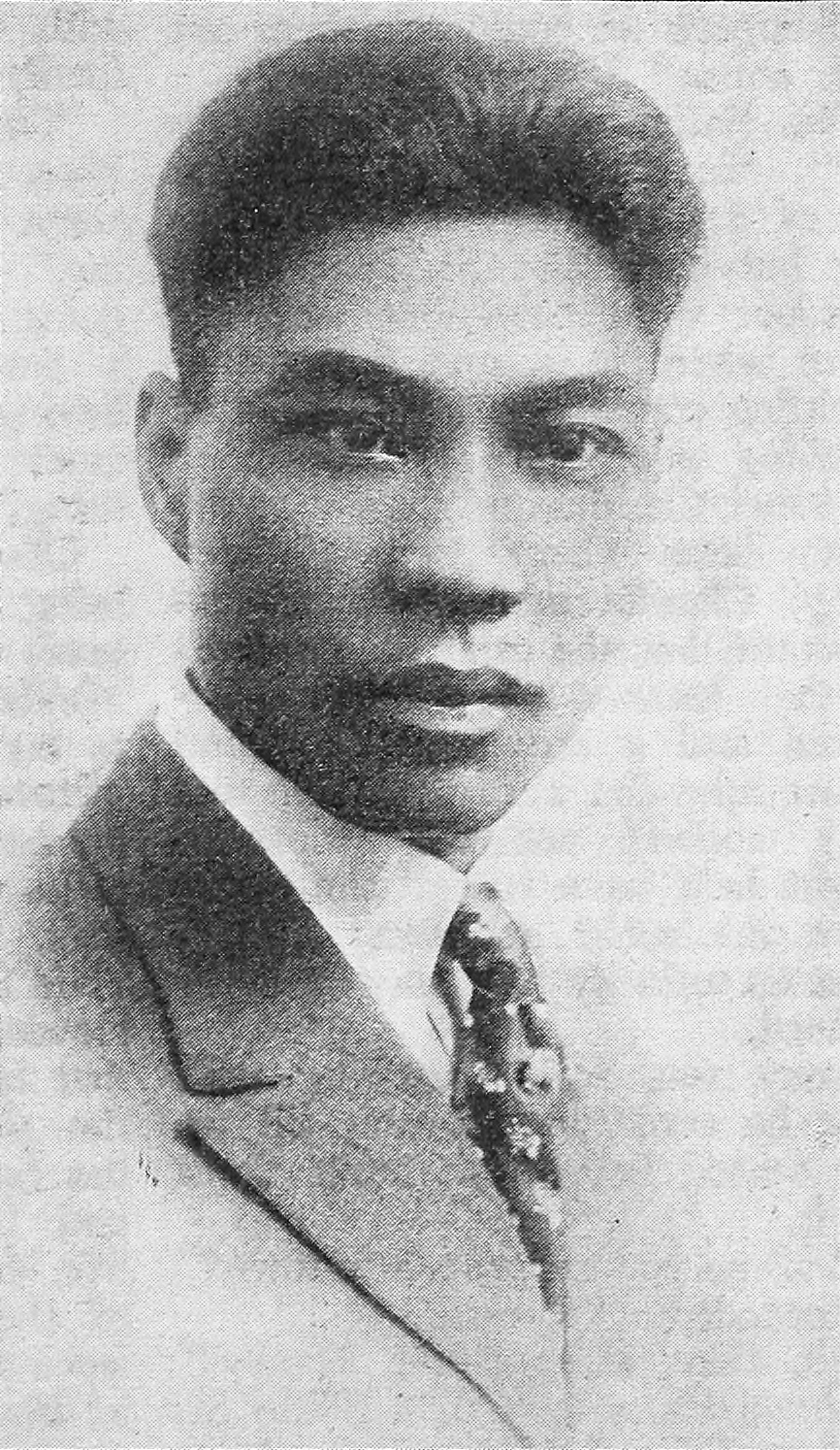
- Born: Leong But-jung; November 2, 1889; Shanghai, Qing Empire
- Died: December 16, 1967 (aged 78); Los Angeles, California, U.S.
- Education: Marion Normal College
- Occupations: Actor, director
- Spouse: Agatha Tarwater (m. 1934)

James B. Leong (born Leong But-jung and sometimes credited as Jimmy Leong; November 2, 1889 — December 16, 1967) was a Chinese-American character actor and filmmaker who had a long career in Hollywood beginning during the silent era.

Leong was born in Shanghai, and he moved to the United States with his parents when he was young. He graduated from Marion Normal College in Muncie, Indiana, in 1915 and briefly worked at a newspaper before moving to Hollywood, where he worked at first as a technical director for filmmakers like D. W. Griffith and Wesley Ruggles.

By 1919, he had started his own production company — James B. Leong Productions, later known as the Wah Ming Motion Picture Company — to show Chinese life as it really was. He had grown tired of seeing Chinese people portrayed as kidnappers and assassins on the screen. Under this banner, he wrote and directed the 1921 film Lotus Blossom. During that time, he had said he planned to write and direct four films a year, though it never came to fruition, with a planned follow-up, The Unbroken Promise, never filmed.

He took work as an actor, playing smaller roles in Hollywood films, as well as continuing to work as a technical director and dialect coach. He made money by growing silk crops in the 1940s.

He married Agatha Tarwater in 1934; the pair had a son together. Leong became a U.S. citizen in 1958.

== Selected filmography ==
As writer-director

- Lotus Blossom (1921)

As producer

- China Speaks (1937)

As actor

- The Purple Dawn (1923) as Quan Foo
- The Remittance Woman (1923) as Chuen To Yan
- Defying the Law (1924) as Dr. Chong Foo
- The Devil Dancer (1927) as The Grand Lama
- China Slaver (1929) as Lee Mandarin
- Come and Get It! (1929) as Singapore Joe
- Welcome Danger (1929) as Florist Henchman / High Priest (uncredited)
- Shanghai Lady (1929) as Counselor
- Uppercut O'Brien (Short) (1929) as Chinese Doctor (uncredited)
- Lotus Lady (1930) as Li
- Chinatown After Dark (1931) as Servant (uncredited)
- The Hatchet Man (1932) as Tong Member (uncredited)
- Shanghai Express (1932) as Rebel (uncredited)
- The Heart Punch (1932) as Wong
- Tangled Destinies (1932) as Ling
- The Mask of Fu Manchu (1932) as Guest (uncredited)
- Trick for Trick (1933) as Chinese Henchman (uncredited)
- Son of Kong (1933) as Chinese Trader (uncredited)
- The Hell Cat (1934) as Chinese Man (uncredited)
- Mandalay (1934) as Leong the Waiter (uncredited)
- The Cat's-Paw (1934) as Lee Chang / Chinese Villager (uncredited)
- The Mysterious Mr. Wong (1934) as Wong Henchman (uncredited)
- Chinatown Squad (1935) as Chinese Man (uncredited)
- Shadows of the Orient (1935) as Ching Chu
- Captured in Chinatown (1935) as Wong
- East of Java (1935) as Crewman (uncredited)
- Charlie Chan in Shanghai (1935) Shanghai Police Operator (uncredited)
- Shadow of Chinatown (1936) as Wong
- Mr. Deeds Goes to Town (1936) as Chinese Chauffeur (uncredited)
- Midnight Blunders (1936) as Chinese Man (uncredited)
- Ace Drummond (1936) as Henry Kee
- The Good Earth (1937) as Chinese Peasant (uncredited)
- West of Shanghai (1937) as Pao (uncredited)
- Thank You, Mr. Moto (1937) as Peiping Cop (uncredited)
- The Singing Marine (1937) as Shanghai Radio Announcer (uncredited)
- Mr. Moto Takes a Chance (1938) as Native (uncredited)
- International Settlement (1938) as Officer (uncredited)
- The Adventures of Marco Polo (1938) as Tartar Warrior (uncredited)
- Red Barry (1938) as Chinese Waiter (uncredited)
- North of Shanghai (1939) as Police Sergeant
- Daughter of the Tong (1939) as Importer (uncredited)
- Drums of Fu Manchu (1940) as Chinese Si Fan Member (uncredited)
- South of Pago Pago (1940) as Waiter
- They Met in Bombay (1941) as Third Mate (uncredited)
- Lady from Chungking (1942) as Chen
- A Yank on the Burma Road (1942) as Guerilla Leader
- The Tuttles of Tahiti (1942) as Candy Salesman (uncredited)
- Remember Pearl Harbor (1942) as Japanese Major
- Submarine Raider (1942) as Toramatsu (uncredited)
- Wake Island (1942) as Secretary to Japanese Envoy (uncredited)
- Across the Pacific (1942) as Nura (uncredited)
- Tarzan's New York Adventure (1942) as Sun Lee's Measuring Assistant (uncredited)
- Behind the Rising Sun (1943) as Japanese Swordsman (uncredited)
- Headin' for God's Country (1943) as Japanese Officer
- Destination Tokyo (1943) as Japanese (uncredited)
- Rookies in Burma (1943) as Japanese Soldier in Tank (uncredited)
- Dragon Seed (1944) as City Man (uncredited)
- The Keys of the Kingdom (1944) as Taoist Priest at Boy's Healing (uncredited)
- The Fighting Seabees (1944) as Japanese Officer (uncredited)
- The Purple Heart (1944) as Army Aide (uncredited)
- Marine Raiders (1944) as Japanese Officer (uncredited)
- China Sky (1945) as Orderly (uncredited)
- Secret Agent X-9 (1945) as Japanese Pilot (uncredited)
- First Yank Into Tokyo (1945) as Japanese Soldier (uncredited)
- Prison Ship (1945) as Japanese Soldier (uncredited)
- Shadows Over Chinatown (1946) as Curio Shop Owner (uncredited)
- Deception (1946) as Wedding Guest (uncredited)
- Green Dolphin Street (1947) as Chinese Longshoreman (uncredited)
- The Beginning or the End (1947) as Japanese Army Officer (uncredited)
- Her Husband's Affairs (1947) as Acrobat (uncredited)
- To the Ends of the Earth (1948) as Chinese Driver (uncredited)
- Boston Blackie's Chinese Venture (1949) as Chinese Hatchet Man (uncredited)
- Squadron of Doom (TV Movie) (1949) as Henry Kee
- I Was an American Spy (1951) as Ho Sang (uncredited)
- Peking Express (1951) as Train Conductor (uncredited)
- Smuggler's Island (1951) as Native in Sampan (uncredited)
- Macao (1952) as Hood (uncredited)
- The Cisco Kid (TV Series) (1953) (Season 4 Episode 8: "Chinese Gold") as Chinese Worker (uncredited)
- The Shanghai Story (1954) as Policeman (uncredited)
- Autumn Leaves (1956) as Grocery Stocker (uncredited)
- Alfred Hitchcock Presents (1958) (Season 3 Episode 37: "The Canary Sedan")
- Buchanan Rides Alone (1958) as Gomez's Friend (uncredited)
- China Doll (1958) as Townsman (uncredited)
- Peter Gunn (1958) (Season 1 Episode 10: "The Man with the Scar") as Cook
- Rio Bravo (1959) as Burt (uncredited)
- Adventures in Paradise (1959) (Season 1 Episode 4: "The Lady from South Chicago") as Chinese Merchant
- The Mountain Road (1960) (uncredited)
- Have Gun - Will Travel (TV Series) (1960) (Season 3 Episode 25: "The Hatchet Man") as 2nd Hatchet Man
- Gidget Goes Hawaiian (1961) as Restaurant Patron (uncredited)
