= Lady Tsen Mei =

American actress

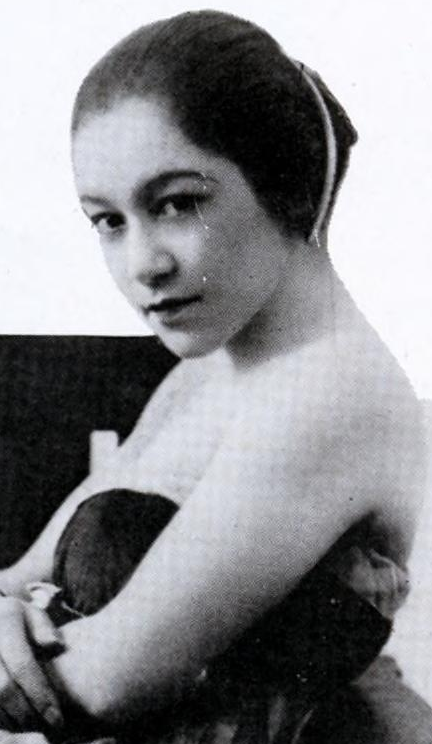
- Lady Tsen Mei, in repose, from Photo-Play World, December 1918.
- Born: Josephine Augusta Moy; March 28, 1888; Philadelphia, Pennsylvania
- Died: July 1985 (aged 97); Norfolk, Virginia
- Other names: Tsen Mei, Sen Mei, Josephine Kramer
- Occupation: Actress

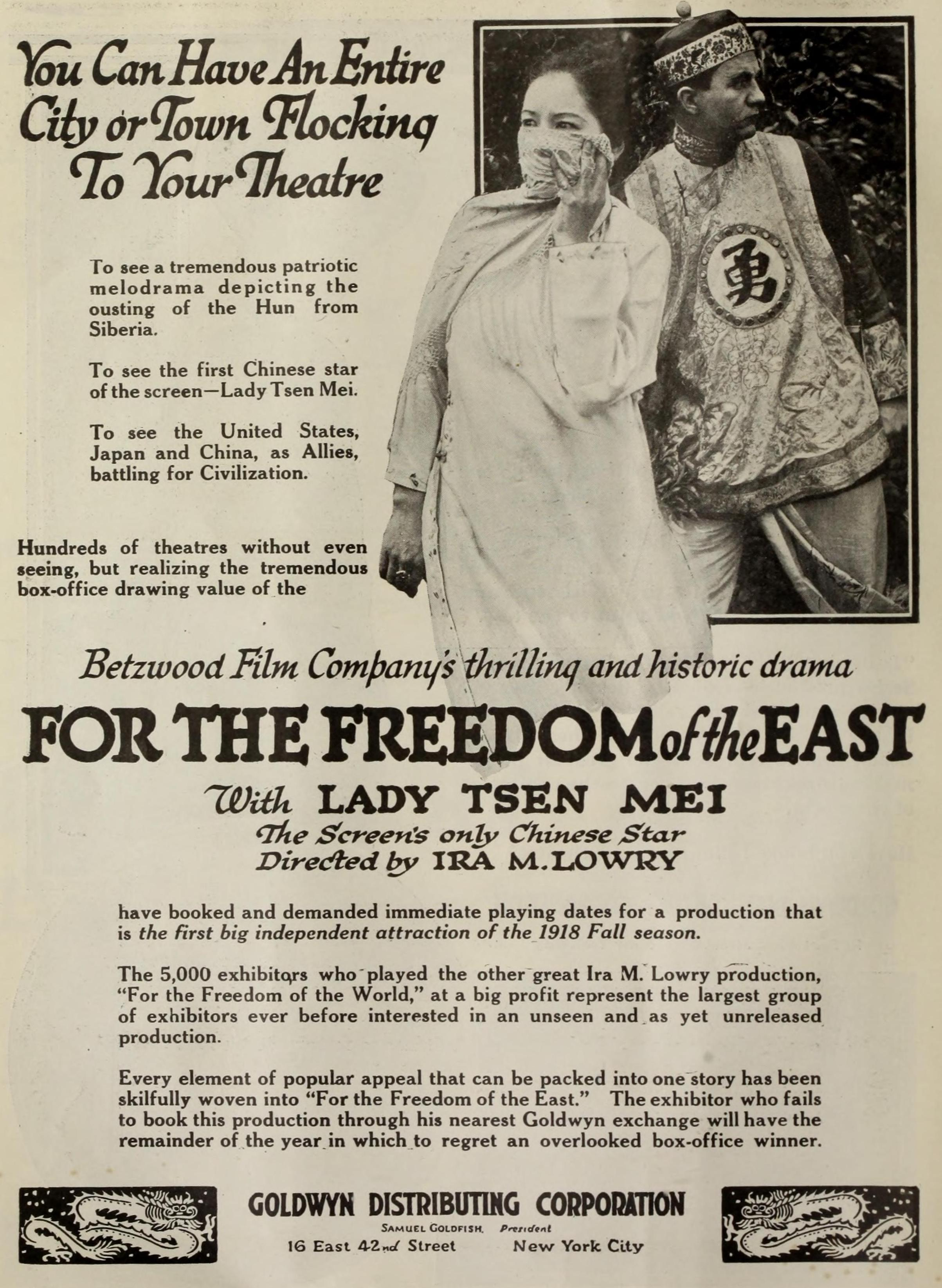
For the Freedom of the East film distribution advertisement, The Moving Picture World

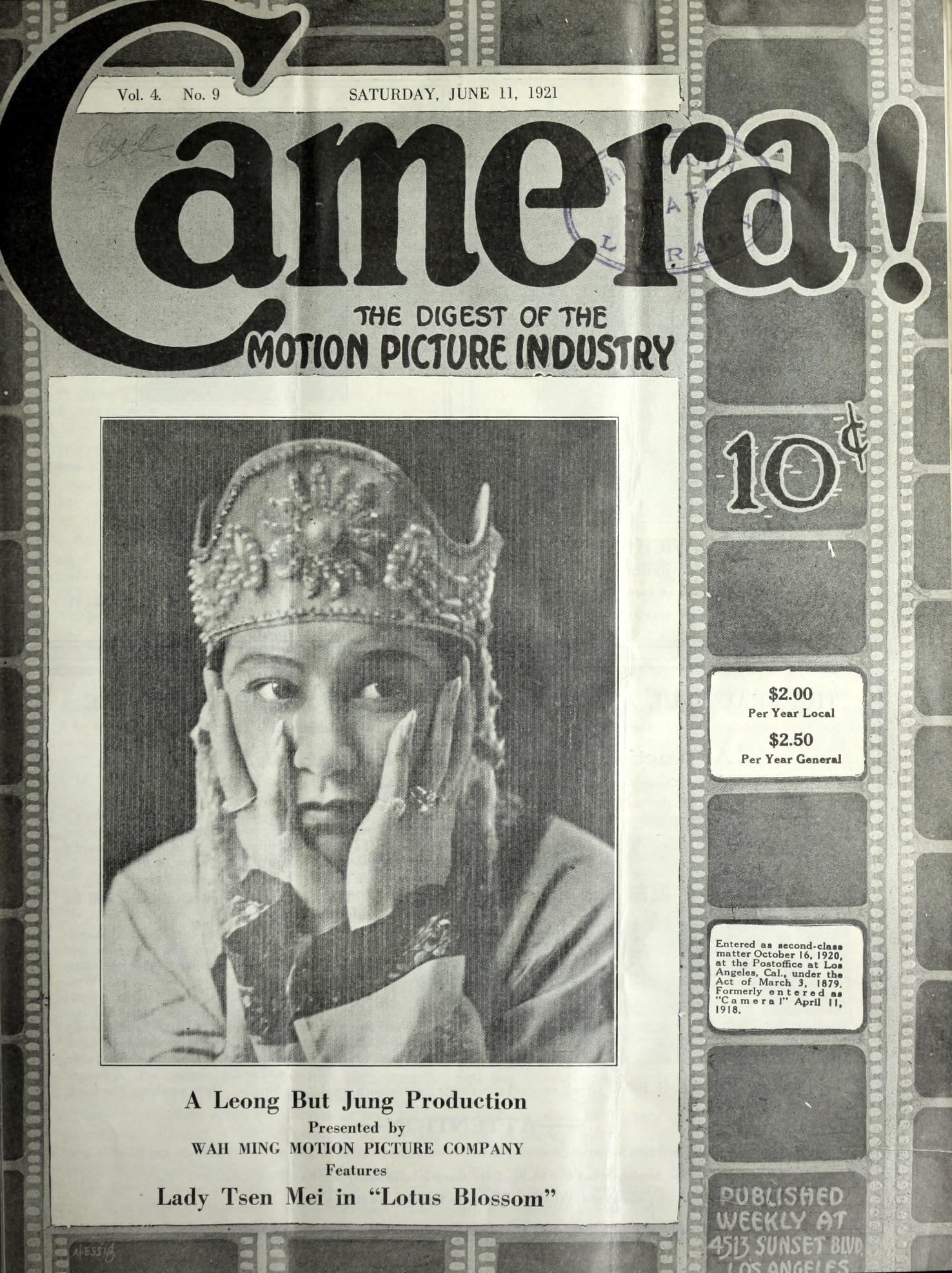
Lady Tsen Mei on the cover of Camera! magazine, advertising Lotus Blossom

Josephine Augusta Moy (March 28, 1888 – July 1985), known professionally as Lady Tsen Mei, was an American actress and singer. She was billed as "the screen's only Chinese star" in publicity for her first film, For the Freedom of the East (1918).

== Early life ==
Josephine Augusta Moy was born in Philadelphia, the daughter of Shu Chong Moy and Jessica Whitehurst. Her father was born in China and her mother in Virginia. She was later raised by a foster father, Jin Fuey Moy, who was born in China, trained as a physician in the United States, and faced repeated legal difficulties involving his personal relationships, narcotics, and human trafficking. She was raised in Pittsburgh's Chinatown.

Moy is described as "multiracial". Being of Chinese ethnicity from her father's side and of mostly white European descent on her mother's side, she was identified as white in the 1910 census. Her Chinese ancestry was often emphasized in films and film publicity; through her mother she also had some African ancestry.

== Career ==
Moy appeared on the American vaudeville stage as Lady Tsen Mei as early as 1915, and into the mid-1920s. One of her vaudeville acts involved singing to imitate various birds. She toured in Australia and China as a singer and actress in 1916 and 1917, and in England and France in 1919. She sang the title role in a 1919 revival of The Geisha, though a critic commented that "her vocal means are slight and technically hampered."

She was featured in several American-made silent films, in roles and with publicity that emphasized her Chinese ancestry. She played a Chinese freedom fighter in For the Freedom of the East (1918, now lost), a film made by the Betzwood Film Company in Pennsylvania. She held top billing in Lotus Blossom (1921), a drama set in historical China, co-directed and co-written by James B. Leong. In The Letter (1929), an early talking picture, Lady Tsen Mei appears alongside Jeanne Eagels, in a pre-Code murder drama set in Singapore. She was also seen in Daughter of Heaven (1930).

Lady Tsen Mei was the first actress of color given a full-page feature in Photoplay magazine; the 1918 feature, and similar accounts, included various stories fabricated to increase her exotic appeal, such as a mentions of her being born in China, and attending medical school (or law school, or, in some accounts, both). Mentions of her athletic prowess, however, seem to have had a stronger basis in fact.

== Filmography ==
- 1918 For the Freedom of the East as Princess Tsu
- 1921 Lotus Blossom as Moy Tai
- 1929 The Letter as Li-Ti
- 1930 Daughter of Heaven

== Personal life ==
Moy married twice and had a daughter. She was widowed when Archibald E. Kramer died in 1971, and she died Norfolk, Virginia in 1985, aged 97 years. In recent years, American film scholar Ramona Curry has reconstructed the life and career of Lady Tsen Mei.
