= For the Freedom of the East =

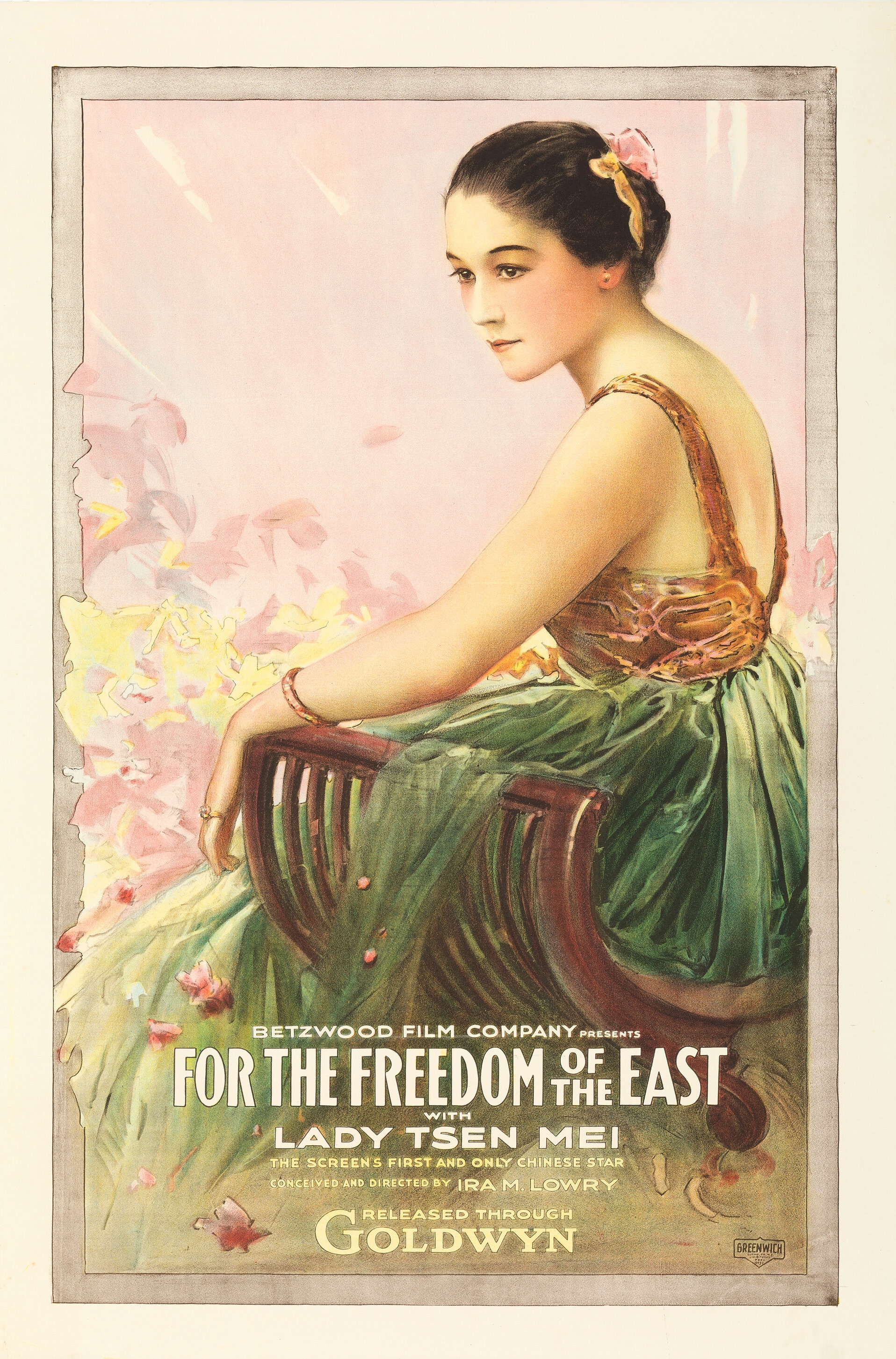
- Poster
- Directed by: Ira M. Lowry
- Written by: J. Allan Dunn; Ira M. Lowry
- Starring: Lady Tsen Mei
- Cinematography: David Calcagni
- Production company: Betzwood Pictures
- Distributed by: Goldwyn Pictures
- Release date: October 1918
- Running time: 7 reels
- Country: United States
- Language: Silent (English intertitles)

For the Freedom of the East is a 1918 American silent drama film directed by Ira M. Lowry and starring Lady Tsen Mei (born Josephine Augusta Moy). It was produced by Betzwood Pictures, an organization distantly affiliated with the soon to be defunct Lubin Manufacturing Company and distributed by Goldwyn Pictures.

== Cast ==
- Lady Tsen Mei as Princess Tsu
- Lai Mon Kim as The Viceroy
- H. H. Pattee as Von Richtman (credited as Herbert Horton Pattee)
- Ben Hendricks as Prince Kang
- Robert Elliott as Robert Kenyon
- Neil Moran as Minister Emmons, American Consul
- Joe Chong (Undetermined Role)
- Rosie Moey (Undetermined Role)
- Lee Poy (Undetermined Role)
- Edward Lee (Undetermined Role)
- Gilbert Leong (Undetermined Role)

== Preservation ==
With no prints of For the Freedom of the East located in any film archives, it is a lost film.
