= The Letter (1929 film) =

1929 American crime film by Jean de Limur

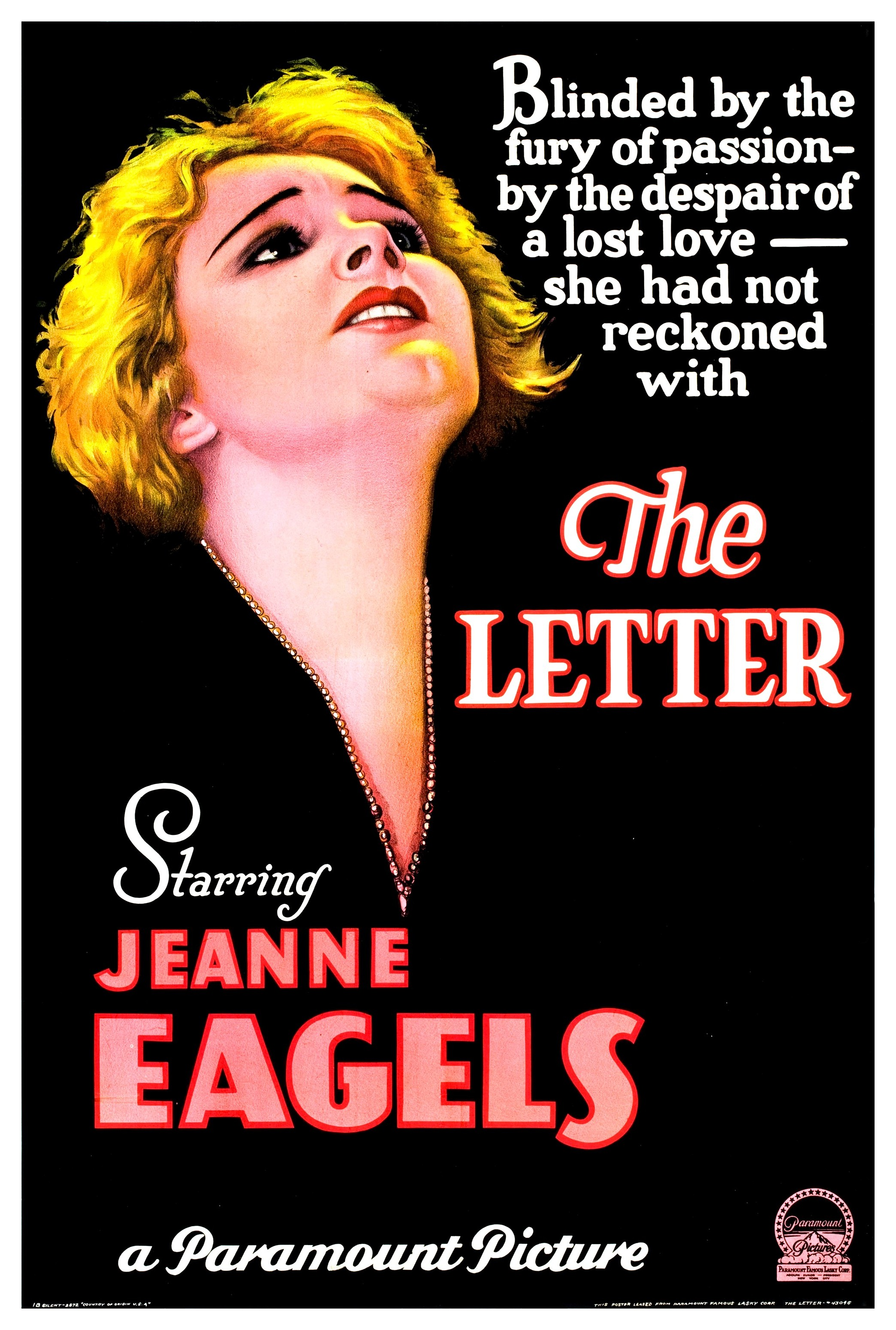
- Theatrical release poster
- Directed by: Jean de Limur
- Screenplay by: Garrett Fort
- Based on: The Letter; 1927 play by W. Somerset Maugham
- Produced by: Monta Bell
- Starring: Jeanne Eagels; Reginald Owen; Herbert Marshall; Irene Browne; O.P. Heggie; Lady Tsen Mei
- Cinematography: George J. Folsey
- Edited by: Jean de Limur; Monta Bell
- Color process: Black and white
- Production company: Paramount Pictures
- Distributed by: Paramount Pictures
- Release dates: March 17, 1929 (New York City); April 13, 1929 (Worldwide)
- Running time: 60 minutes
- Country: United States
- Language: English
- Box office: $8,900,000 (domestically)

The Letter is a 1929 American pre-Code drama film directed by Jean de Limur and released by Paramount Pictures. It was the first full-sound feature shot at Astoria Studios in Queens, New York City. A silent version of the film was also released. The film stars stage actress Jeanne Eagels in her penultimate role and O.P. Heggie. The film was adapted by Garrett Fort from the 1927 play The Letter by W. Somerset Maugham. The film marks the acting debut of Reginald Owen, who played Robert Crosbie in the film, and the sound film debut of Herbert Marshall, who had appeared in only one previous motion picture, the British film Mumsie in 1927.

The plot of the film follows Leslie Crosbie, a young woman living on a rubber plantation in the East Indies of Singapore, who falls in love with a man named Geoffrey Hammond, as she no longer finds any affection for her current husband, Robert Crosbie. However, Geoffrey falls in love with a Chinese woman named Li-Ti, and Leslie shoots him dead. Placed on trial for her life, Leslie perjures herself on the stand and claims that she killed Geoffrey in defense of her honor. However, a letter written by Leslie prior to the shooting that's currently owned by Li-Ti has enough evidence for the court to find her guilty of murder, therefore Leslie must try to buy the letter off Li-Ti and get rid of it to avoid it being released to the jury.

The Letter was long out of circulation. In June 2011, a restored edition of the film was released on home video by Warner Bros. as part of its Warner Archive Collection as a made-on-demand DVD. The film's lobby cards and its other forms of advertising entered the public domain on January 1, 2025, as they were works published in 1929. However, the film itself was already in the public domain, since its copyright was never renewed.

== Plot ==
The full film

Bored and lonely living on her husband's rubber plantation down in Singapore, Leslie Crosbie, takes a lover, Geoffrey Hammond, but he eventually tires of her and takes a Chinese mistress, Li-Ti. When Leslie learns of Geoffrey's new mistress, she insists on seeing him while her husband is away and tries to rekindle his love. However, Geoffrey is not moved and informs Leslie that he prefers Li-Ti. Leslie becomes enraged and shoots Geoffrey repeatedly.

At the murder trial, Leslie perjures herself on the stand, claiming that she had little to do with Hammond and that she shot him when he tried to rape her. Meanwhile, Li-Ti's emissary provides Joyce, Leslie's attorney, with a copy of a letter in which Leslie begged Hammond to visit her. Li-Ti is ready to sell it for $10,000, provided Leslie makes the exchange. On Joyce's advice, Leslie agrees. Li-Ti humiliates her but eventually accepts the money. Leslie is found not guilty.

Joyce presents his bill to Leslie's husband Robert, who demands to know why the expenses total $10,000. Joyce relates the story of Li-Ti's blackmail and gives Robert the damning letter. Robert confronts Leslie and forces her to admit everything. As punishment, Robert keeps her on the plantation even though he no longer has any money. Leslie proclaims that she still loves Geoffrey despite killing him.

== Cast ==
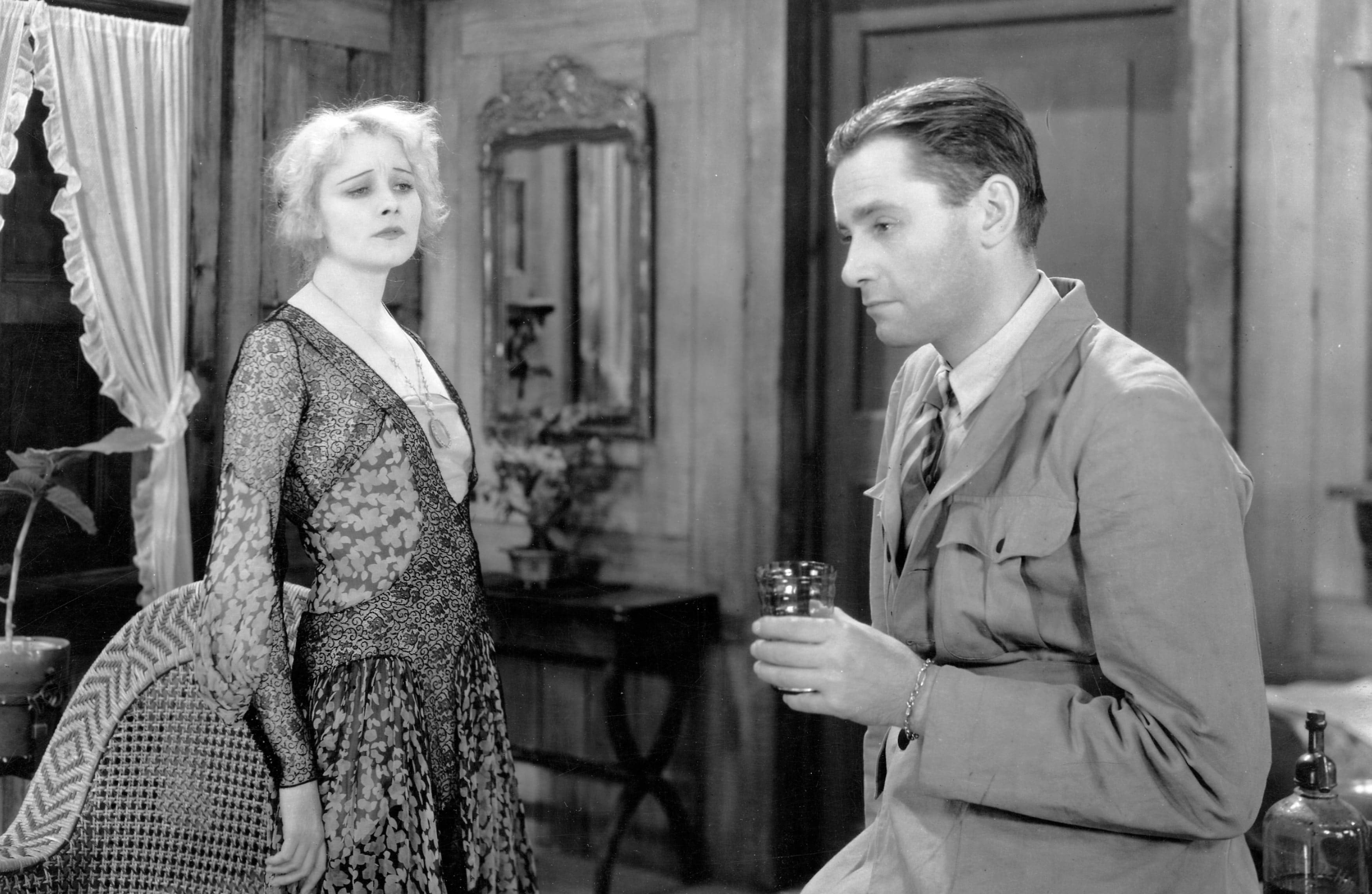
Jeanne Eagels and Herbert Marshall as Leslie Crosbie and Geoffrey Hammond

- Jeanne Eagels as Leslie Crosbie
- Reginald Owen as Robert Crosbie
- Herbert Marshall as Geoffrey Hammond
- Irene Browne as Mrs. Joyce
- O.P. Heggie as Mr. Joyce
- Lady Tsen Mei as Li-Ti
- Tamaki Yoshiwara as Ong Chi Seng

== Production ==
The story was inspired by a real-life scandal involving the Eurasian wife of the headmaster of a school in Kuala Lumpur, who was convicted in a murder trial after shooting dead a male friend in April 1911. She was eventually pardoned by the local sultan after a public furor.

Very little is known about the film's production. The film was shot at Astoria Studios in Queens, New York City. The film consisted of 5,778 ft, with at least six reels. In 1931, Paramount Pictures released versions of the film dubbed in the Spanish, German, French and Italian languages.

== Reception ==
The film was a hit upon release, earning $8,900,000 domestically. The New York Times praised the film and considered it "an important piece of theater and film history." They also claimed Eagels was a "brilliant, eccentric and spectacularly self-destructive actress."

== Censorship ==
When The Letter was released in the United States, many states and cities in the United States had censor boards that could require cuts or other eliminations before the film could be shown. The Chicago Board of Censors passed the film but restricted it to "for adults only". The flagship Chicago Theatre advertised the film as "too daring" to be seen by immature eyes and did $59,500 for one week at the 4,400-seat venue.

== Awards and nominations ==
Jeanne Eagels, who died just months after the film was completed, was posthumously nominated for the Academy Award for Best Actress. She was the first performer to be nominated by the Academy after her death, although all nominations at the 2nd Academy Awards were unofficial, and she was listed among several actresses "under consideration" by a board of judges.

The Letter was included in the Top Ten Films list of 1929 by the National Board of Review.

== Preservation ==
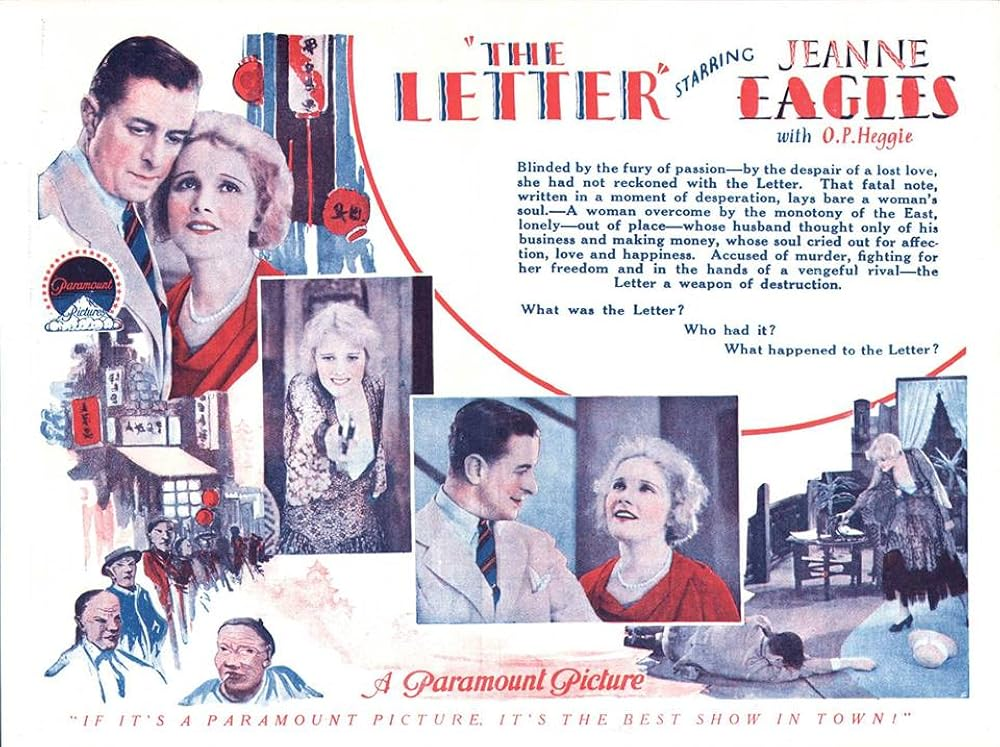
One of the few surviving lobby cards for the film

Due to it being long out of circulation, the film was believed to be lost. However on April 3, 2011, a workprint of the film was found and given to the Library of Congress and The Film Foundation, who restored the film in June 2011. The film was then released on home video by Warner Bros. Pictures as part of its Warner Archive Collection as a made-on-demand DVD. It is the only surviving sound film starring Jeanne Eagels.

The film's lobby cards and its other forms of advertising entered the public domain on January 1, 2025, as they were works published in 1929. However, the film itself was already in the public domain, since its copyright was never renewed.

== Remake ==
Herbert Marshall, who plays Leslie's lover in the film, also appears, this time as her husband, in William Wyler's 1940 Warner Bros. remake. Bette Davis received an Oscar nomination for the role of Leslie Crosbie in the 1940 version.

== See also ==
- List of rediscovered films
- List of early sound feature films (1926–1929)
