= As the Earth Turns (1938 film) =

- Directed by: Richard Lyford
- Written by: Richard Lyford
- Produced by: Ed Hartman; Jonathan Keasey; Richard Lyford
- Starring: Barbara Berjer; Alan Hoelting; Edwin C. Frost
- Cinematography: Richard Lyford
- Edited by: Richard Lyford
- Music by: Ed Hartman
- Release date: May 1, 2019; (United States)
- Running time: 46 minutes
- Country: United States
- Languages: Silent / Black and White

As the Earth Turns is a 1938 American independent, science-fiction and silent film directed by Richard Lyford. Lyford was age 20 when he directed As the Earth Turns, and the film is one of many avant-garde films that he made in Seattle, Washington, before finding success with Walt Disney in the 1940s.

== Summary ==
He portrays Pax, a central character in the film, "who attempts to persuade the world to put down its weapons by inducing extreme climate change".

== Cast ==
- Barbara Berjer as Julie Weston (as Barbara Berger)
- Alan Hoelting as Arther Verrill
- Edwin C. Frost as Prof. Lionel Banks
- Richard Lyford as PAX

== Rediscovery ==
Like most of Lyford's early films, it was presumed lost until it was discovered in his former Seattle home over 80 years later. KING-TV reported that the film may have never left Lyford's basement, which he would use as an auditorium to show his films. After the rediscovery, Lyford's family asked Seattle composer Ed Hartman to create a score for the film. As the Earth Turns made its theatrical premiere at the Seattle International Film Festival in 2019. LA Weekly wrote that by October 2019, the rediscovered film "played at over 100 film festivals worldwide and garnered many awards along the way". It made its television debut on Turner Classic Movies on October 31, 2021.
