= National Board of Review Awards 1931 =

Annual US film awards ceremony

3rd National Board of Review Awards

1931

The 3rd National Board of Review Awards were announced in 1931.

== Top Ten Films ==
- Cimarron
- City Lights
- City Streets
- Dishonored
- The Front Page
- The Guardsman
- Quick Millions
- Rango
- Surrender
- Tabu

== Top Foreign Films ==
- The Threepenny Opera
- The Song of Life
- Under the Roofs of Paris
- Westfront 1918
