= Mr. Deeds Goes to Town =

1936 film by Frank Capra

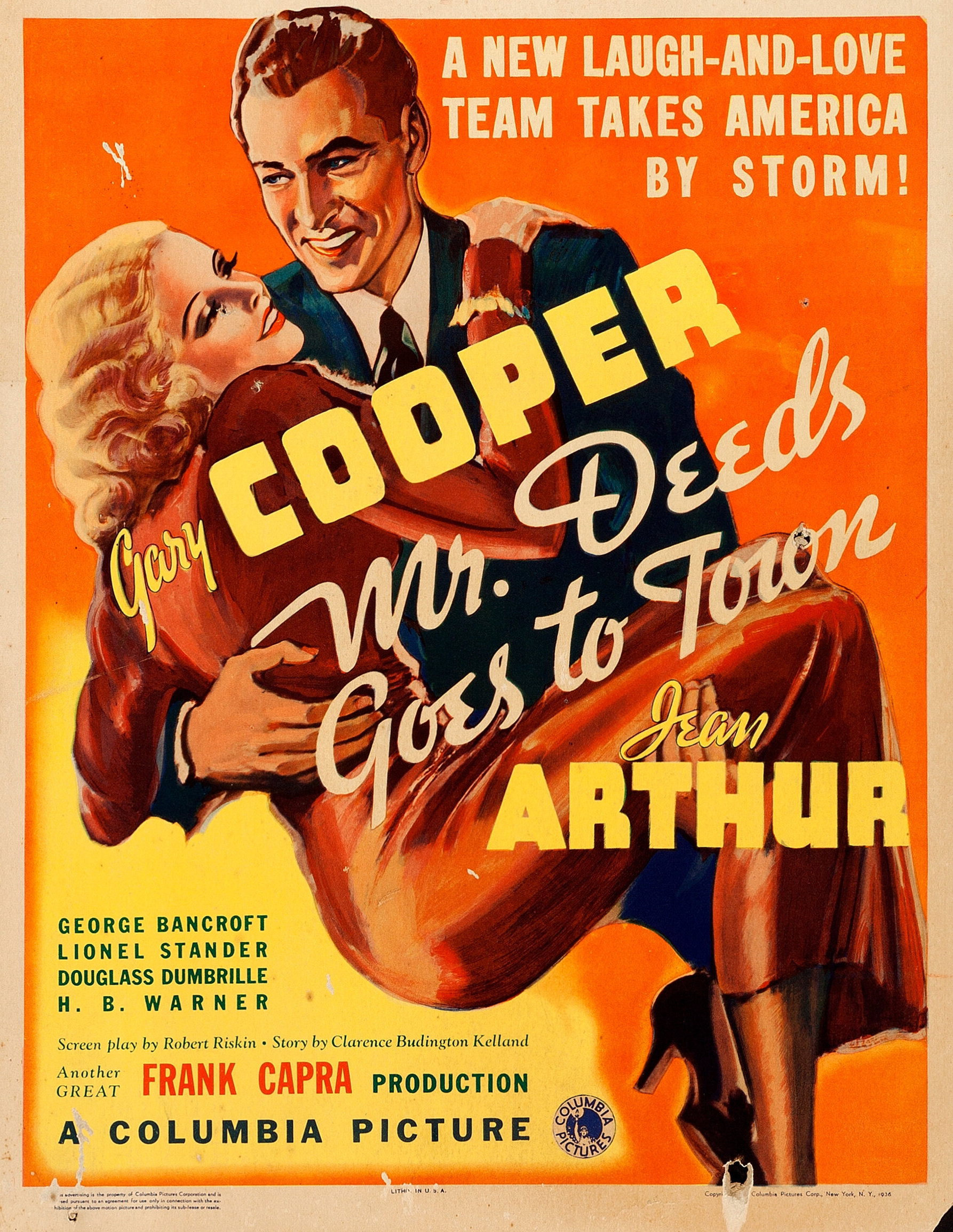
- Window card poster
- Directed by: Frank Capra
- Screenplay by: Robert Riskin
- Based on: Opera Hat; 1935 story in American Magazine by Clarence Budington Kelland
- Produced by: Frank Capra
- Starring: Gary Cooper; Jean Arthur; George Bancroft; Lionel Stander; Douglass Dumbrille; H. B. Warner
- Cinematography: Joseph Walker
- Edited by: Gene Havlick
- Music by: Howard Jackson (musical director)
- Production company: Columbia Pictures Corp. of Calif. LTD.
- Distributed by: Columbia Pictures Corporation
- Release date: April 12, 1936
- Running time: 116 minutes
- Country: United States
- Language: English
- Budget: $845,710 or $500,000
- Box office: $2.5 million (rentals)

Mr. Deeds Goes to Town is a 1936 American romantic comedy-drama film produced and directed by Frank Capra and starring Gary Cooper and Jean Arthur in her first featured role. Based on the 1935 short story "Opera Hat" by Clarence Budington Kelland, which appeared in serial form in The American Magazine, the screenplay was written by Robert Riskin in his fifth collaboration with Capra.

== Plot ==
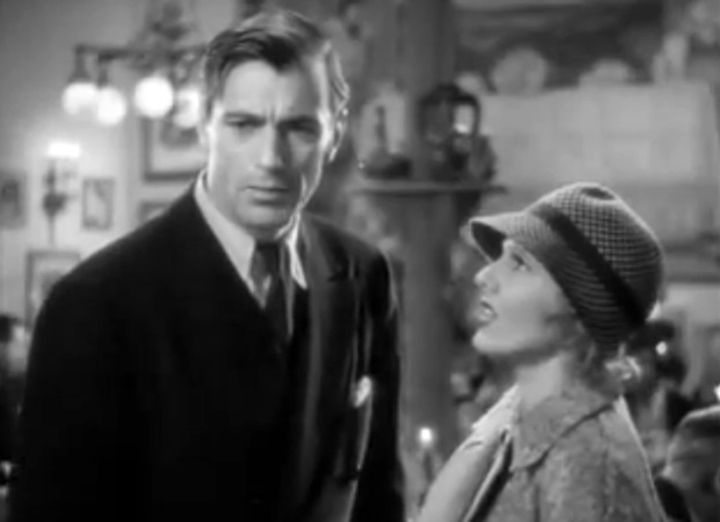
Gary Cooper and Jean Arthur in the film's trailer

Longfellow Deeds is the co-owner of a tallow works, part-time greeting card poet, and tuba-playing inhabitant of the hamlet of Mandrake Falls, Vermont. During the Great Depression he inherits 20 million dollars from his uncle, Martin Semple. Semple's scheming attorney, John Cedar, locates Deeds and brings him to New York City. Cedar gives his cynical troubleshooter, ex-newspaperman Cornelius Cobb, the task of keeping reporters away from Deeds.

Cobb is outfoxed by star reporter Louise "Babe" Bennett, who appeals to Deeds' romantic fantasy of rescuing a damsel in distress by masquerading as a poor worker named Mary Dawson. She pretends to faint from exhaustion after "walking all day to find a job" and worms her way into his confidence. Bennett proceeds to write a series of enormously popular newspaper articles on Longfellow, portraying him as a madcap yokel who has suddenly inherited riches, giving him the nickname "Cinderella Man".

Cedar tries to get Deeds' power of attorney in order to keep his own financial misdeeds secret. Deeds, however, proves to be a shrewd judge of character, easily fending off Cedar and other greedy opportunists. He wins Cobb's wholehearted respect and eventually Babe's love, falling for her and proposing in a poem. She quits her job in shame, but before she can tell Deeds the truth about herself, Cobb finds out and tells Deeds. Deeds is left heartbroken and decides to return to Mandrake Falls.

After he has packed and is about to leave, a dispossessed farmer stomps into his mansion and threatens him with a gun. He expresses his scorn for the seemingly heartless, ultra-rich man, who feeds doughnuts to horses but will not lift a finger to help the multitudes of desperate poor. After the intruder comes to his senses, Deeds realizes that he can put his troublesome fortune to good use. He decides to provide 2,000 fully equipped 10-acre (4-hectare) farms free to homeless families if they will work the land for three years.

Cedar joins forces with Deeds' only other relative, Semple, and his shrewish wife, in an attempt to have Deeds declared mentally incompetent. A sanity hearing is scheduled to determine who should control the fortune. During the hearing, Cedar calls an expert who diagnoses Deeds with manic depression based on Babe's articles and witnesses to his recent behavior. As he has since been taken into custody, Deeds continues to refuse to speak.

Babe speaks up passionately on his behalf, blaming herself for what she did to him. When he realizes that she truly loves him, he begins speaking, systematically punching holes in Cedar's case and then punching Cedar in the face. The judge declares him to be not only sane, but "the sanest man who ever walked into this courtroom." Victorious, Deeds and Babe embrace and kiss, Deeds sweeping her up into his arms and carrying her off.

== Cast ==
- Gary Cooper as Longfellow Deeds
- Jean Arthur as Babe Bennett
- George Bancroft as MacWade
- Lionel Stander as Cornelius Cobb
- Douglass Dumbrille as John Cedar
- Raymond Walburn as Walter
- H. B. Warner as Judge May
- Ruth Donnelly as Mabel Dawson
- Walter Catlett as Morrow
- John Wray as Farmer

Uncredited

- Margaret Seddon as Jane
- Margaret McWade as Amy
- Gustav von Seyffertitz as Doctor Emile von Haller
- Emma Dunn as Mrs. Meredith, Deeds' housekeeper
- Charles Lane as Hallor, crook lawyer
- Jameson Thomas as Mr. Semple
- Mayo Methot as Mrs. Semple
- Gladden James as Court Clerk
- Paul Hurst as 1st Deputy
- Warren Hymer as bodyguard
- Franklin Pangborn as the tailor
- George "Gabby" Hayes as the spokesman for the farmers

== Production ==
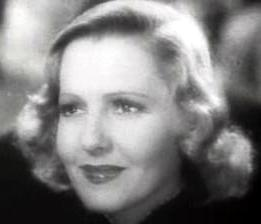
Jean Arthur as Louise "Babe" Bennett

Originally, Frank Capra intended to make Lost Horizon after Broadway Bill (1934), but lead actor Ronald Colman could not get out of his other filming commitments. Thus, Capra began adapting Mr. Deeds Goes to Town. As production began, the two lead actors were cast: Gary Cooper as Longfellow Deeds and Jean Arthur as Louise "Babe" Bennett/Mary Dawson. Cooper was Capra's "first, last and only choice" for the pivotal role of the eccentric Longfellow Deeds.

Arthur was not the first choice for the role, but Carole Lombard, the original female lead, quit the film just three days before principal photography, in favor of a starring role in My Man Godfrey. The first scenes shot on the Fox Studios' New England street lot were in place before Capra found his replacement heroine in a rush screening. The opening sequences had to be reshot when Capra decided against the broad comedy approach that had originally been written.

Despite his penchant for coming in "under budget," Capra spent an additional five shooting days in multiple takes, testing angles and "new" perspectives, treating the production as a type of workshop exercise. Due to the increased shooting schedule, the film came in at $38,936 more than the Columbia budget for a total of $806,774. Throughout pre-production and early principal photography, the project still retained Kelland's original title, Opera Hat, although Capra tried out some other titles including A Gentleman Goes to Town and Cinderella Man before settling on a name that was the winning entry in a contest held by the Columbia Pictures publicity department.

== Reception ==
The film was generally treated as likable fare by critics and audiences. Novelist Graham Greene, then also a film critic, was effusive in his praise, stating that this was Capra's finest film to date and describing Capra's treatment as "a kinship with his audience, a sense of common life, a morality". Variety noted "a sometimes too thin structure [that] the players and director Frank Capra have contrived to convert ... into fairly sturdy substance. "

In his diary, Reichsminister of Public Enlightenment and Propaganda Joseph Goebbels praised the film, writing, "Marvelous stuff from America, with Gary Cooper. Wonderfully made, excellent ideas, beautifully acted. I am delighted."

This was the first Capra film to be released separately to exhibitors and not "bundled" with other Columbia features. On paper, it was his biggest hit, easily surpassing It Happened One Night.

It was the seventh most popular film at the British box office in 1935–36. In a 2004 listing compiled by the British Film Institute, Mr. Deeds Goes to Town was placed at number 88 in their all-time chart based on cinema admissions in the UK, with an estimate attendance of 8.3 million.

=== Accolades ===
Year	Award ceremony	Category	Nominee	Result
1937	Academy Awards	Best Picture	Columbia	Nominated
1937	Academy Awards	Best Director	Frank Capra	Won
1937	Academy Awards	Best Actor	Gary Cooper	Nominated
1937	Academy Awards	Best Original Story	Robert Riskin	Nominated
1937	Academy Awards	Best Sound Recording	John P. Livadary	Nominated
1937	New York Film Critics Circle Awards	Best Film	Mr. Deeds Goes to Town	Won
1937	New York Film Critics Circle Awards	Best Actor	Gary Cooper	Nominated
1936	National Board of Review Awards	Best Film	Mr. Deeds Goes to Town	Won
1936	National Board of Review Awards	Top Ten Films	Mr. Deeds Goes to Town	Won
1936	Venice Film Festival	Mussolini Cup for Best Foreign Film	Mr. Deeds Goes to Town	Nominated
1936	Venice Film Festival	Special Recommendation	Frank Capra	Won

Mr. Deeds Goes to Town is recognized by American Film Institute in these lists:

- 2000: AFI's 100 Years...100 Laughs – No. 70
- 2006: AFI's 100 Years...100 Cheers – No. 83

== Adaptations ==
A radio adaptation of Mr. Deeds Goes to Town was originally broadcast on February 1, 1937, on Lux Radio Theater. In that broadcast, Gary Cooper, Jean Arthur and Lionel Stander reprised their roles from the 1936 film.

A planned sequel, titled Mr. Deeds Goes to Washington, eventually became Mr. Smith Goes to Washington (1939). Although the screenplay was actually based on an unpublished story titled The Gentleman from Montana, it was initially intended as a sequel with Cooper reprising his role. (Note: Author Lewis Foster later testified during a lawsuit that he had written the story specifically with Gary Cooper in mind.) Because Cooper was unavailable, Capra immediately reenvisioned the project as being suited for Jimmy Stewart (who was borrowed from MGM) and Jean Arthur (who plays a character with a different name).

The second animated feature film from Fleischer Studios, Mr. Bug Goes to Town, was inspired by Mr. Deeds Goes to Town.

A short-lived ABC television series of the same name ran from 1969 to 1970, starring Monte Markham as Longfellow Deeds.

Mr. Deeds Goes to Town was loosely remade as Mr. Deeds in 2002, starring Adam Sandler and Winona Ryder.

The Bengali film Raja-Saja (1960) starring Uttam Kumar, Sabitri Chatterjee, and Tarun Kumar, and directed by Bikash Roy was a Bengali adaptation of this film.

The 1994 comedy The Hudsucker Proxy had several plot elements borrowed from this film.

A Japanese manga adaption of Mr. Deeds Goes to Town was made in 2010 by Ogata Hiromi, titled Bara no Souzokunin.

The 1949 Tamil film Nallathambi starring N S Krishnan was an adaptation of Mr. Deeds Goes to Town, aimed at promoting social justice and education.

The 1983 Turkish film Çarıklı Milyoner is inspired by Mr. Deeds Goes to Town.

== Digital restoration ==
In 2016, Mr. Deeds Goes to Town was re-released with a 4K digital restoration for the film's 80th anniversary.

== In popular culture ==
The bucolic Vermont town of Mandrake Falls, home of Longfellow Deeds, is now considered to be an archetype of small town America, with Clarence Budington Kelland, the author of the original story, having created a type of "cracker-barrel" view of rural values contrasted with that of sophisticated "city folk". The word pixilated, (Note: Used in the picture to describe someone afflicted with pixies in the head...whimsical, capricious, barmy) previously limited to New England (and attested there since 1848), "had a nationwide vogue in 1936" thanks to its prominent use in the film, although its use in the screenplay may not be an accurate interpretation. (Note: A correspondent to Notes and Queries in 1937 objected to the screenplay's use of "pixilated" to mean "crazy" because the more correct meaning of "a 'pixilated' man" is "one whose whimseys [sic] are not understood by practical-minded people." Quoted in the Oxford English Dictionary, 2nd ed. (1989), s.v. "Pixilated".)

The word doodle, in its modern specific sense of drawing on paper rather than in its older more general sense of 'fooling around', may also owe its origin – or at least its entry into common usage – to the final courtroom scene in this film. The Longfellow Deeds character, addressing the judge, explains the concept of a doodler – which the judge has not heard before – as being "a word we made up back home to describe someone who makes foolish designs on paper while they're thinking."

The courtroom scene inspired the publication in the year after its release of a book that incorporated both words, Everybody's Pixillated: A Book of Doodles.

The lyrics to the 1977 Rush song "Cinderella Man" on the A Farewell to Kings album are based on the story of Mr. Deeds Goes to Town.

In the film Baby Boom, a babysitter refers to her hometown of Mandrake Falls.
