= National Board of Review Awards 1932 =

Annual US film awards ceremony

4th National Board of Review Awards

December 22, 1932

The 4th National Board of Review Awards were announced on December 22, 1932.

== Top Ten Films ==
1. I Am a Fugitive from a Chain Gang
2. As You Desire Me
3. A Bill of Divorcement
4. A Farewell to Arms
5. Madame Racketeer
6. Payment Deferred
7. Scarface
8. Tarzan the Ape Man
9. Trouble in Paradise
10. Two Seconds

== Top Foreign Films ==
1. À nous la liberté
2. Der Andere
3. The Battle of Gallipoli
4. Golden Mountains
5. Kameradschaft
6. Mädchen in Uniform
7. Der Raub der Mona Lisa
8. Reserved for Ladies
9. Road to Life
10. Zwei Menschen

== Winners ==
- Best Film: I Am a Fugitive from a Chain Gang
- Best Foreign Film: À nous la liberté
