= National Board of Review Awards 1936 =

Annual US film awards ceremony

8th National Board of Review Awards

December 18, 1936

The 8th National Board of Review Awards were announced on 18 December 1936.

== Best American Films ==
1. Mr. Deeds Goes to Town
2. The Story of Louis Pasteur
3. Modern Times
4. Fury
5. Winterset
6. The Devil Is a Sissy
7. Ceiling Zero
8. Romeo and Juliet
9. The Prisoner of Shark Island
10. The Green Pastures

== Top Foreign Films ==
1. Carnival in Flanders
2. The New Earth
3. Rembrandt
4. The Ghost Goes West
5. Nine Days a Queen
6. We Are from Kronstadt
7. Son of Mongolia
8. The Yellow Cruise
9. Les Misérables
10. Secret Agent

== Winners ==
- Best American Film: Mr. Deeds Goes to Town
- Best Foreign Film: La kermesse héroïque (Carnival in Flanders), France
