= National Board of Review Awards 1930 =

Annual US film awards ceremony

2nd National Board of Review Awards

1930

The 2nd National Board of Review Awards were announced in 1930.

== Top Ten Films ==
- All Quiet on the Western Front
- Holiday
- Laughter
- The Man from Blankley's
- Men Without Women
- Morocco
- Outward Bound
- Romance
- Street of Chance
- Tol'able David

== Top Foreign Films ==
- High Treason
- Old and New
- Soil
- Storm Over Asia
- Two Hearts in Waltz Time
