= National Board of Review Awards 1929 =

Annual US film awards ceremony

1st National Board of Review Awards

1929

The 1st National Board of Review Awards were announced in 1929.

== Top Ten Films ==
- Applause
- Broadway
- Bulldog Drummond
- The Case of Lena Smith
- Disraeli
- Hallelujah!
- The Letter
- The Love Parade
- Paris Bound
- The Valiant

== Top Foreign Films ==
- Arsenal
- The Passion of Joan of Arc
- October: Ten Days That Shook the World
- Piccadilly
- Homecoming
