= The Organizer =

- Italian theatrical release poster
- Directed by: Mario Monicelli
- Written by: Mario Monicelli; Age & Scarpelli
- Produced by: Franco Cristaldi
- Starring: Marcello Mastroianni; Renato Salvatori; Annie Girardot; Folco Lulli; Gabriella Giorgelli; Bernard Blier; Raffaella Carrà; François Périer; Vittorio Sanipoli
- Cinematography: Giuseppe Rotunno
- Edited by: Ruggero Mastroianni
- Music by: Carlo Rustichelli
- Distributed by: Paramount Pictures; Lux Film
- Release date: October 25, 1963
- Running time: 128 minutes
- Country: Italy
- Language: Italian

The Organizer (Italian: I compagni (Note: "I compagni" literally translates into "The Comrades.")) is a 1963 Italian-French-Yugoslavian-produced drama film written by Mario Monicelli and Age & Scarpelli, and directed by Mario Monicelli. Set in Turin at the end of the 19th century, it stars Marcello Mastroianni as a labor activist who becomes involved with a group of textile factory workers who go on strike.

The film had its premiere at the 35th Congress of the Italian Socialist Party. The script was nominated for Best Original Screenplay at the 37th Academy Awards.

== Plot ==
The film is set in Turin at the end of the 19th century and opens with a scene showing workers of all ages, including young teenager Omero (Franco Ciolli), rising at 5:30 in the morning before heading to a textile factory where they work until 8:30 in the evening.

Towards the end of the day, fatigue starts taking its toll and disaster strikes when the hand of a drowsy worker is mangled by a machine. Workers Pautasso (Folco Lulli), Martinetti (Bernard Blier), and Cesarina (Elvira Tonelli) decide to form an ad hoc committee and speak to management and state their case that the 14-hour work day needs to be shortened by one hour to avoid accidents arising from exhaustion. Their request is ignored and they only receive admonishments to be more careful. Moreover, a subsequent attempt by the workers to emphasize their grievances by staging a walkout an hour early on the next evening results in a humiliating defeat when they lose their nerve and stay until the usual time.

Professor Sinigaglia (Marcello Mastroianni), a labor activist on the run from the police in Genoa, hops off a freight train and comes to hide in the neighborhood. There, he runs into a meeting where the undeterred workers discuss the idea of all coming to work an hour late to make their point. The bookish-looking, unassuming Sinigaglia becomes involved, and in a burst of fiery rhetoric persuades the workers to escalate their struggle by not coming to work at all and going on strike instead. Drawing on his own experience, he also helps them to prepare effectively by building up a stock of supplies.

The workers committee expresses its gratitude by assigning Sinigaglia as a guest to Raoul, a bitter worker who is skeptical about the others' determination as well as the movement's chances of success, and is displeased with this arrangement.

After a failed attempt at inducing the strikers to resume work by granting token concessions without shortening work days, management proceeds to bring in workers freshly laid off by another factory to take over. A confrontation ensues between the strikers and the replacement workers, resulting in Pautasso's death. This tragedy draws the attention of the press and the government, forcing the factory owners to send the replacement workers back home. However, the police also manage to track down Sinigaglia to Raoul's home, sending the professor on the move again after a narrow escape.

As the duration of the strike reaches a month, the factory owners are suffering severe financial losses and are close to giving in. Unaware of this and suffering from both low supplies and a low morale, workers meet and vote to end the strike. Sinigaglia then reappears, delivers yet more fiery rhetoric and convinces them not only to keep striking but to escalate the movement by occupying the factory. In a showdown between the strikers and an army unit dispatched to block access to the premises, soldiers fire into the crowd, killing Omero and sending the others fleeing. Sinigaglia is arrested by the police, and Raoul has to go into hiding after attacking a police officer.

The film's end mirrors its beginning: the grim-faced employees are shown crossing the factory gates to resume work, with Omero now replaced by his younger brother (whom Omero had hoped would obtain a better education and escape the fate of factory workers). Meanwhile, Raoul hops on a freight train to find shelter with a member of the underground labor movement in another city, and is now determined to pursue the struggle.

== Cast ==
- Marcello Mastroianni - Professor Sinigaglia
- Renato Salvatori - Raoul
- Gabriella Giorgelli - Adele
- Folco Lulli - Pautasso
- Bernard Blier - Martinetti (Note: The film features several well-known French actors: Bernard Blier, François Périer and Annie Girardot.)
- Raffaella Carrà - Bianca
- François Périer - Maestro Di Meo
- Vittorio Sanipoli - Baudet
- Franco Ciolli - Omero
- Mario Pisu - Manager
- Kenneth Kove - Luigi
- Annie Girardot - Niobe
- Edda Ferronao - Maria
- Anna Di Silvio - Gesummina
- Roberto Diamanti
- Elvira Tonelli - Cesarina

== Background ==
Italy’s first capital after the Risorgimento ended in the 1870s, Turin was in the midst of rapid industrialization during the period of The Organizer, although the film unfolds some years before the growth of the industry. Populating his densely inhabited film with actual workers, Monicelli was attempting, three years before The Battle of Algiers (1966), to create a sort of neorealist period piece; using a strategy that would subsequently be seen in Bonnie and Clyde (1967), The Organizer opens with a montage of historical photographs that skillfully segues into contemporary facsimiles.

=== Style ===
Inspired, according to its director, by the revolutionary ghosts of Paris’s no longer extant Bastille and set in the slums of late-nineteenth-century Turin, the film accepts what the influential Italian Marxist leader Antonio Gramsci saw as “the challenge of modernity,” namely, “to live without illusions and without becoming disillusioned.” To that end, The Organizer is variously (and, for some, disconcertingly) jaunty, sentimental, comic, and baffling, as Monicelli applies the tonal shifts associated with the French New Wave to a straightforward saga of working-class solidarity. Others attribute those tonal shifts to Age & Scarpelli, who "were among the leading screenwriters" of the commedia all'italiana. In an interview, Monicelli said "the subject is serious or tragic, but our point of view is comic and humorous. This is a type of comedy that grows out of the fact that Italians see reality and life precisely in this matter."

known for its period detail and Giuseppe Rotunno’s faux-daguerreotype cinematography, the film is not so much a call to action as to recollection—both a historical monument and a depiction of a specific moment. Throughout, Rotunno’s black-and-white cinematography makes use of flat lighting and gray skies to emphasize soot and smoke. (Because little was left of nineteenth-century Turin, the movie was actually shot in the nearby Piedmontese cities of Cuneo, Fossano, and Savigliano, with the factory interior filmed in Zagreb, Yugoslavia.)

== Reception ==
In May 1964 Walter Reade-Sterling released a 126-minute version of the film; according to Bosley Crowther, that version is a "simple social drama [that] turns out to be engrossingly human, compassionate and humorous....Marcello Mastroianni ... plays the title role with a delightful blend of ardor, ingenuousness and whimsicality. He excels as the shaggy-haired, near-sighted, idealistic intellectual who leads a handful of downtrodden workers ... in a revolt. But the whole thing is done with such veracity and the other roles are so strongly played or, at least, so graphically represented—that one feels right in the middle of one of those classic demonstrations in which the labor movement was born."

Stanley Kauffmann writing for The New Republic called The Organizer 'very interesting and very odd'.

In 1964 the National Board of Review placed the film on its "Year's Five Best Foreign Films". It was nominated for Best Original Screenplay at the 37th Academy Awards.
