= The Titan: Story of Michelangelo =

1950 film

- American poster
- Directed by: Richard Lyford
- Written by: Norman Borisoff
- Produced by: Ralph Alswang; Robert J. Flaherty; Robert Snyder
- Narrated by: Fredric March
- Cinematography: Harry Ringger
- Edited by: Richard Lyford
- Distributed by: Classic Pictures
- Release date: 1950
- Running time: 70 minutes
- Country: Germany
- Language: English

The Titan: Story of Michelangelo is a 1950 German documentary film about the painter and sculptor Michelangelo. It won the Academy Award for Best Documentary Feature.

The film was a re-edited version of a German/Swiss film of 1938 originally titled Michelangelo: Life of a Titan, directed by Curt Oertel. The re-edited version featured a new English narration by Fredric March and a musical score onto a shorter edit of the existing film. The new credits include Richard Lyford as director and Robert Snyder as producer. The film was edited by Lyford. The Academy Film Archive preserved The Titan in 2005.

== Cast ==
- Fredric March as himself/narrator
