= Anatomy of a Marriage =

Anatomy of a Marriage may refer to:

- The name of two 1964 French films directed by André Cayatte. The films relate the story of the break-up of a marriage told from two different point of views:
  - Anatomy of a Marriage: My Days with Françoise (Françoise ou La vie conjugale), tells the story from the man's point of view
  - Anatomy of a Marriage: My Days with Jean-Marc (Jean-Marc ou La vie conjugale), tells the story from the woman's point of view
