= Richard Lyford =

American filmmaker

- Born: October 7, 1917
- Died: November 4, 1985 (aged 68); North Hollywood, Los Angeles, U.S.
- Occupation: Filmmaker
- Years active: 1936–1974

Richard Hoover Lyford (born 7 October 1917; died November 4, 1985, North Hollywood, Los Angeles) was an American filmmaker.

He directed avant-garde films in Seattle, Washington in his early career, including As the Earth Turns. During the 1940s, he worked for Walt Disney.

In 1950, he co-directed and edited The Titan: Story of Michelangelo, which won an Academy Award for documentary feature in 1950 and was preserved by the Academy Film Archive in 2005. In 1951, he moved to Saudi Arabia to produce Island of Allah, a documentary on the history of the Arab people.

In 1969, Richard Lyford returned to the Persian Gulf to produce Hamad and the Pirates, a 93-minute movie about a young Arab pearl diver.
