= Hôtel de Ville, Le Bouscat =

Town hall in Le Bouscat, France

Hôtel de Ville
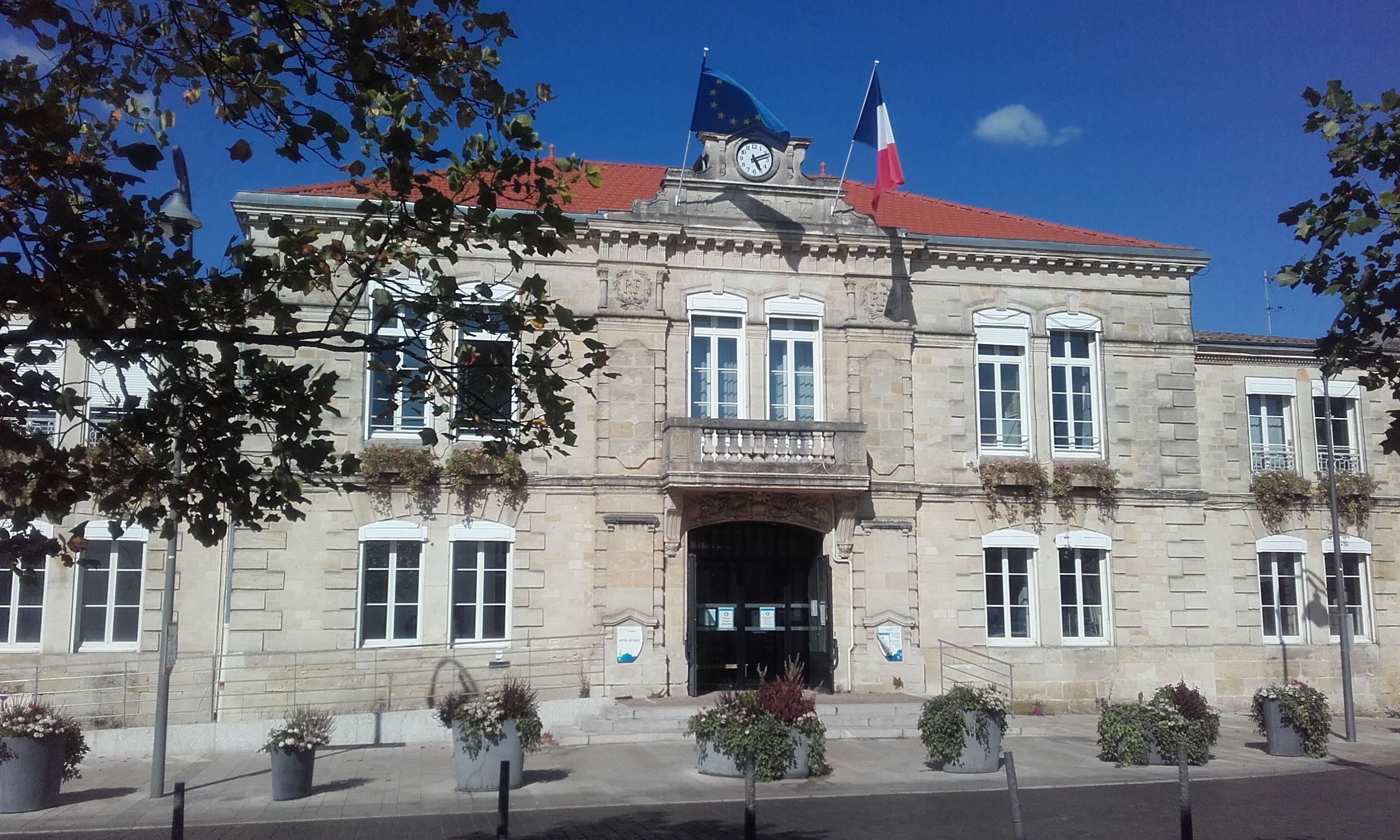
- The main frontage of the Hôtel de Ville in August 2021
- Interactive map of the Hôtel de Ville area

General information
- Type: City hall
- Architectural style: Neoclassical style
- Location: Le Bouscat, France
- Coordinates: 44.8652°N 0.5997°W
- Completed: 1878

The Hôtel de Ville (French pronunciation: [otɛl də vil], City Hall) is a municipal building in Le Bouscat, Gironde, in southwestern France, standing on Place Gambetta.

== History ==
Following the French Revolution the town council initially met in the home of the mayor at the time. As the town developed around the Church of Sainte-Clotilde in the mid-19th century, a school and the teacher's residence was erected on the north side of what is now Place Gambetta, some 100 metres (330 ft) to the east of the church.

In the early 1870s, after significant population growth, the council decided to demolish the old building and to erect a combined town hall and school on the same site. The new building was designed in the neoclassical style, built in ashlar stone at a cost of FFr 120,000 and was officially opened by the mayor, François de Saint-Vidal, in 1878.

The design involved a symmetrical main frontage of nine bays facing onto Place Gambetta. The building was laid out as a main block of three bays and two wings, of three bays each, which were of reduced height and were slightly recessed behind the main block. The main block accommodated the town hall, while the girls' school was in the left wing and the boys' school in the right wing. The central bay, which was slightly projected forward, featured a segmental headed entrance on the ground floor and a pair of segmental headed French doors with a balcony on the first floor. The central bay was flanked by pilasters supporting an entablature, a modillioned cornice and a pediment surmounted by a clock. The outer bays were fenestrated by pairs of segmental headed windows on both floors. Internally, the principal room was the Salle du Conseil (council chamber).

In July 1888, the building was the venue for a meeting of the mayors of Le Bouscat, Eysines, Bruges, and Blanquefort to discuss the implementation of a proposal to construct an electric tramway on the Route du Médoc. Following the meeting, the promoters formed a company, La Compagnie du Tramway Bordeaux-Bouscat-Le Vigean et Extensions, raised FFr100,000 to finance a 4.8 kilometres (3.0 mi) tramway along the route, and opened it in 1894.

On 25 August 1944, during the Second World War, a small group of fighters from the French Forces of the Interior, led by Paul Hochard, seized the town hall and flew the tricolour and the Cross of Lorraine from the balcony in front of a large crowd of local people. They had to temporarily disperse when a German armoured vehicle approached. This was four days before the liberation of the neighbouring city of Bordeaux on 29 August 1944.
