= Maquis Ventoux =

Resistance network

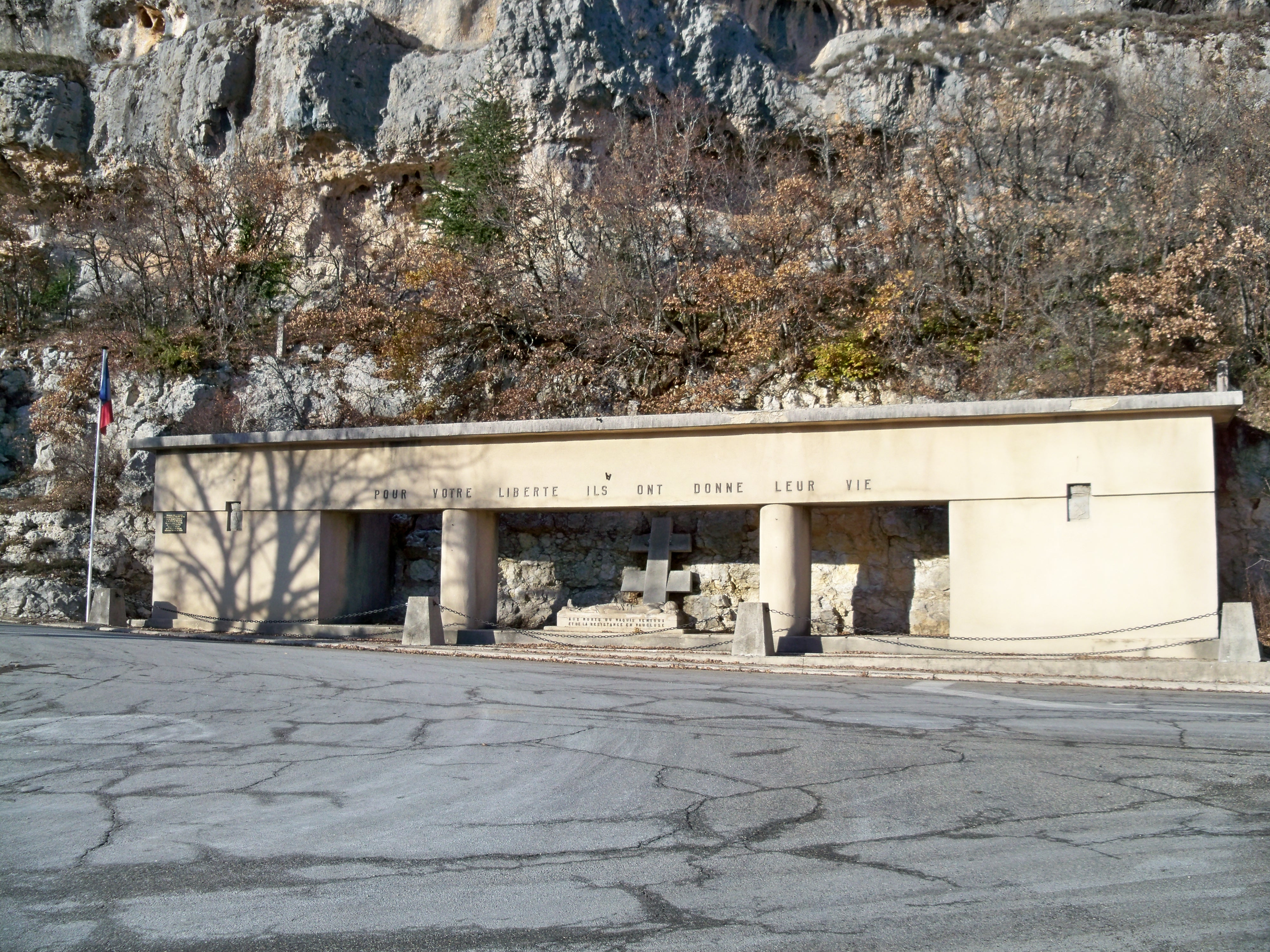
- Memorial to the Ventoux Resistance in Sault (Vaucluse)
Date	December 1942 - August 26, 1944
Location	Provence (Mont Ventoux)

Commanders and leaders
Resistance fighters, then FFI	German Reich; French State French Militia

Units involved
	Germany: men's

The Maquis Ventoux was one of the principal French Resistance groups active in the Provence region during the Second World War. It operated as part of the R2 resistance network, a codename used to designate resistance efforts in southeastern France. The group's strategic significance stemmed from its location in the Mont Ventoux massif within the Rhône Valley, a region that offered natural protection and proximity to key transport routes. Its development was also facilitated by the presence of numerous draft evaders who sought refuge in the area between 1939 and 1940, as well as by widespread support from the local population.

== Historical context ==
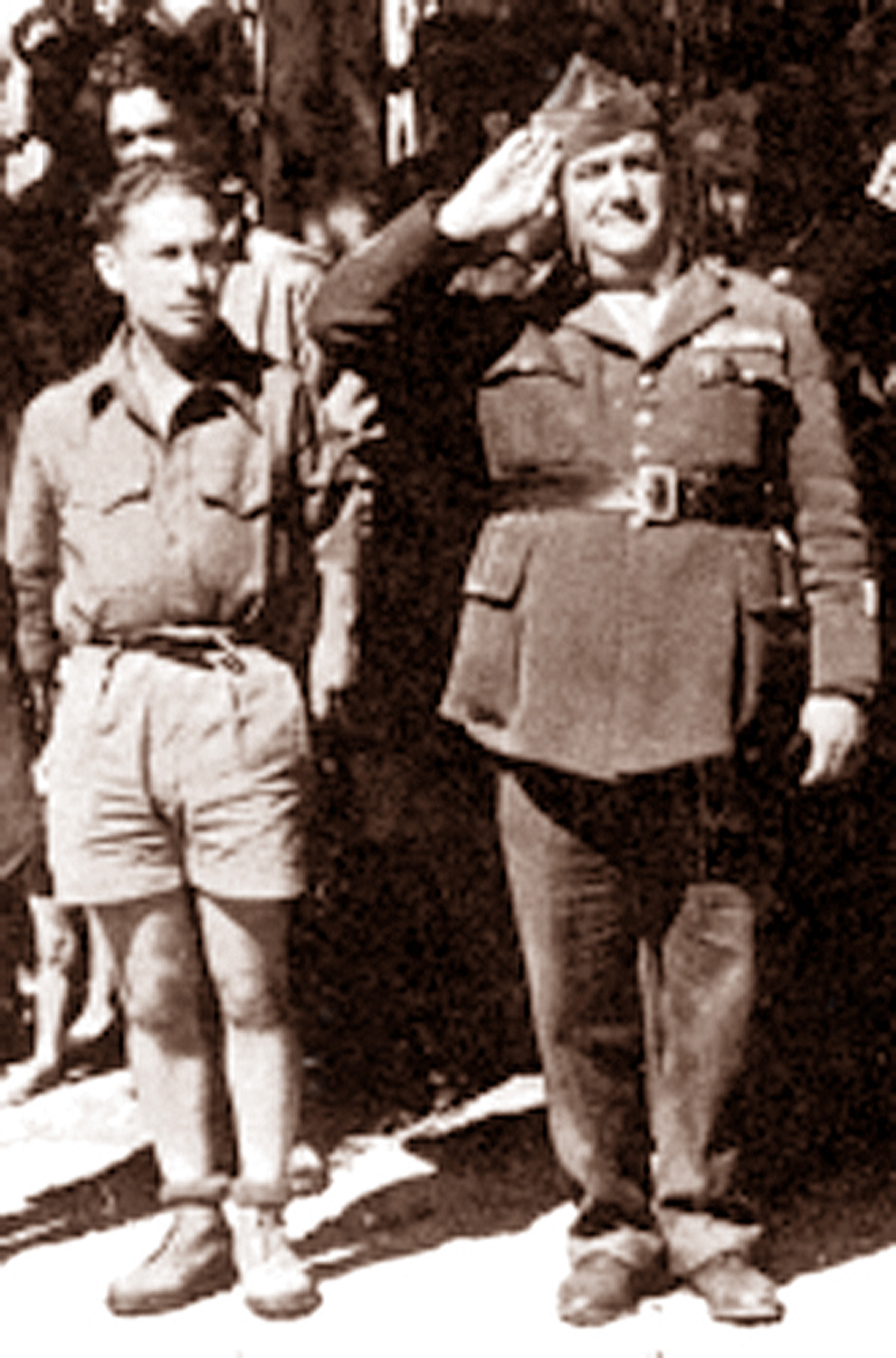
Colonel Beyne (known as d'Artagnan, right) and Maxime Fischer (known as Anatole, left) in 1944

Following the defeat of the French Army in June 1940 during the Battle of France, French Prime Minister Philippe Pétain requested an armistice with Nazi Germany. The Armistice was signed on 22 June 1940, and on 10 July 1940, Pétain assumed full powers as head of the French State, establishing the regime commonly known as Vichy France. On 30 October 1940, he announced the policy of collaboration with Nazi Germany. Shortages and rationing were introduced throughout the country. The Mont Ventoux massif, rich in forest resources, was exploited for timber, which was used to supply gas generators. Its rugged terrain also made it an ideal refuge for individuals evading conscription or persecution.

Among those who took shelter in the region were demobilized soldiers from colonial units, Spanish Republican exiles, and young men from Chantiers de la jeunesse française (French Youth Work Camps). Piedmontese foresters who had previously settled in the region also remained active during this period.

The formation of the Maquis Ventoux began with a meeting in early December 1941 between Philippe Beyne, a reserve lieutenant-colonel and former tax collector of Sault, and Maxime Fischer, a Jewish lawyer who had been disbarred in Paris and had taken refuge in Carpentras. Fischer later described the encounter:

At the Hôtel du Louvre in Sault, I saw a man dressed in an old leather jacket, with the officer’s rosette of the Legion of Honor, two days’ beard, who listened without saying a single word. Little by little, he emitted a few grunts while I explained my plan.

And as I asked him: ‘What do you think, will you go along with us?’ He thought for thirty seconds and answered: ‘Yes, it’s agreed.’ That’s how the Maquis Ventoux was born!

== Geography of the maquis ==
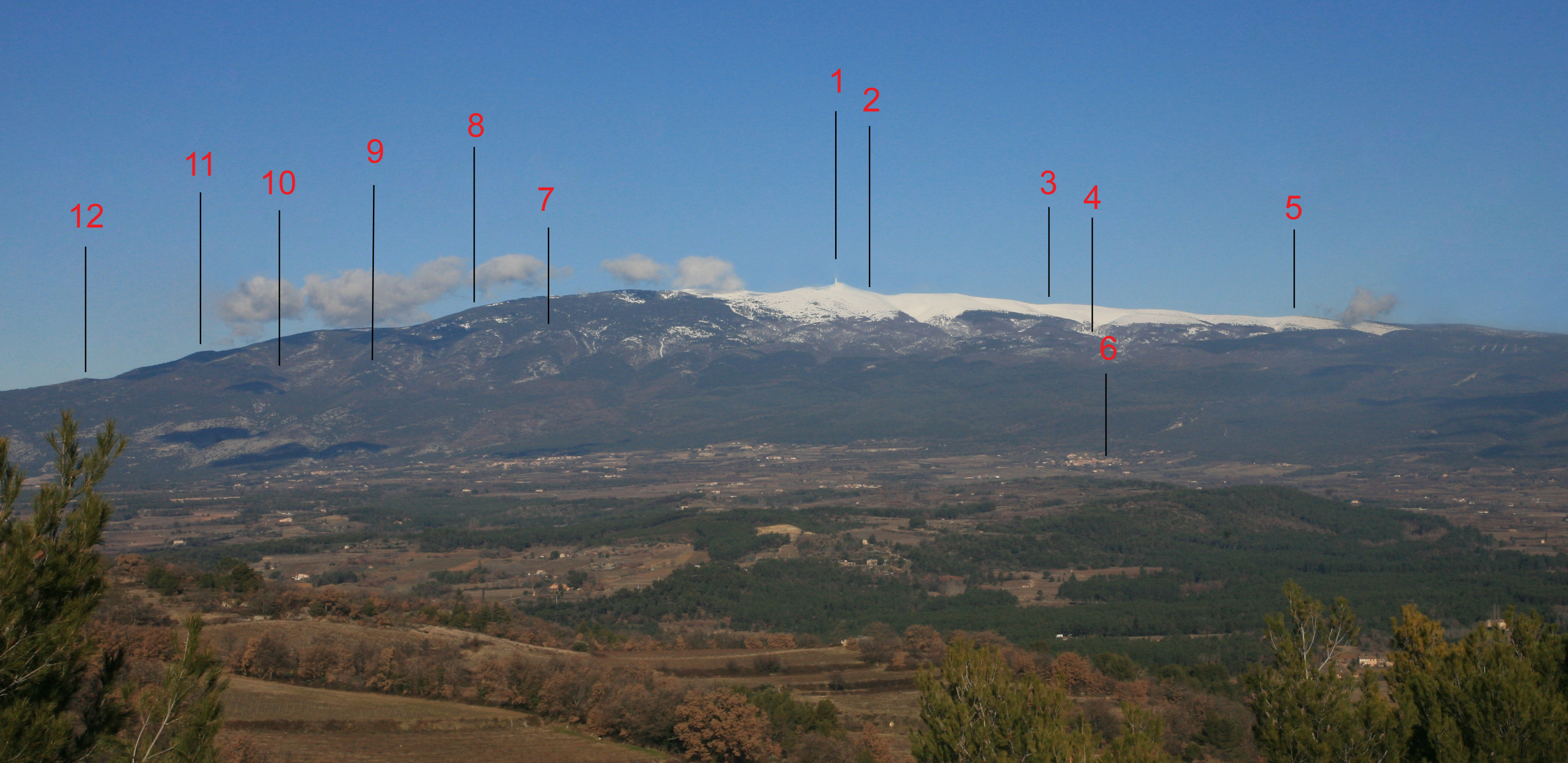
1 = Mont Ventoux - 2 = Col des Tempêtes - 3 = Tête de la Grave - 4 = Chalet Reynard - 5 = Col de la Frache - 6 = Flassan - 7 = Rocher de Cachillan - 8 = Tête de Chauve - 9 = Tête du gros Charne - 10 = Tête du Fribouquet - 11 = Cime Saint Vincent - 12 = Grand Barbeirol

Topographic map of Ventoux

== Supplying the maquisards ==
Beginning in the winter of 1942–1943, the Mont Ventoux region became a refuge for displaced persons from Alsace-Lorraine. In October 1942, Philippe Beyne, his deputy Maxime Fischer, and their associates assisted several dozen young men evading the Service du travail obligatoire (Compulsory Labor Service), providing them with false identity documents and ration cards. In order to facilitate the logistical support of these groups, they were settled near the villages of Aurel, Saint-Trinit, Saint-Christol, Le Barroux, and Saint-Romain-en-Viennois. In a 1964 testimony, Fischer described the initial phase of establishing the Maquis:

The departure for the Maquis was considerably facilitated by the fact that Beyne was very highly regarded in his area. Without him and without the men I had met, there would undoubtedly have been no Maquis. That is how peasants from Sault agreed, at his request — and they would not have done so at anyone else’s — to take in young men.

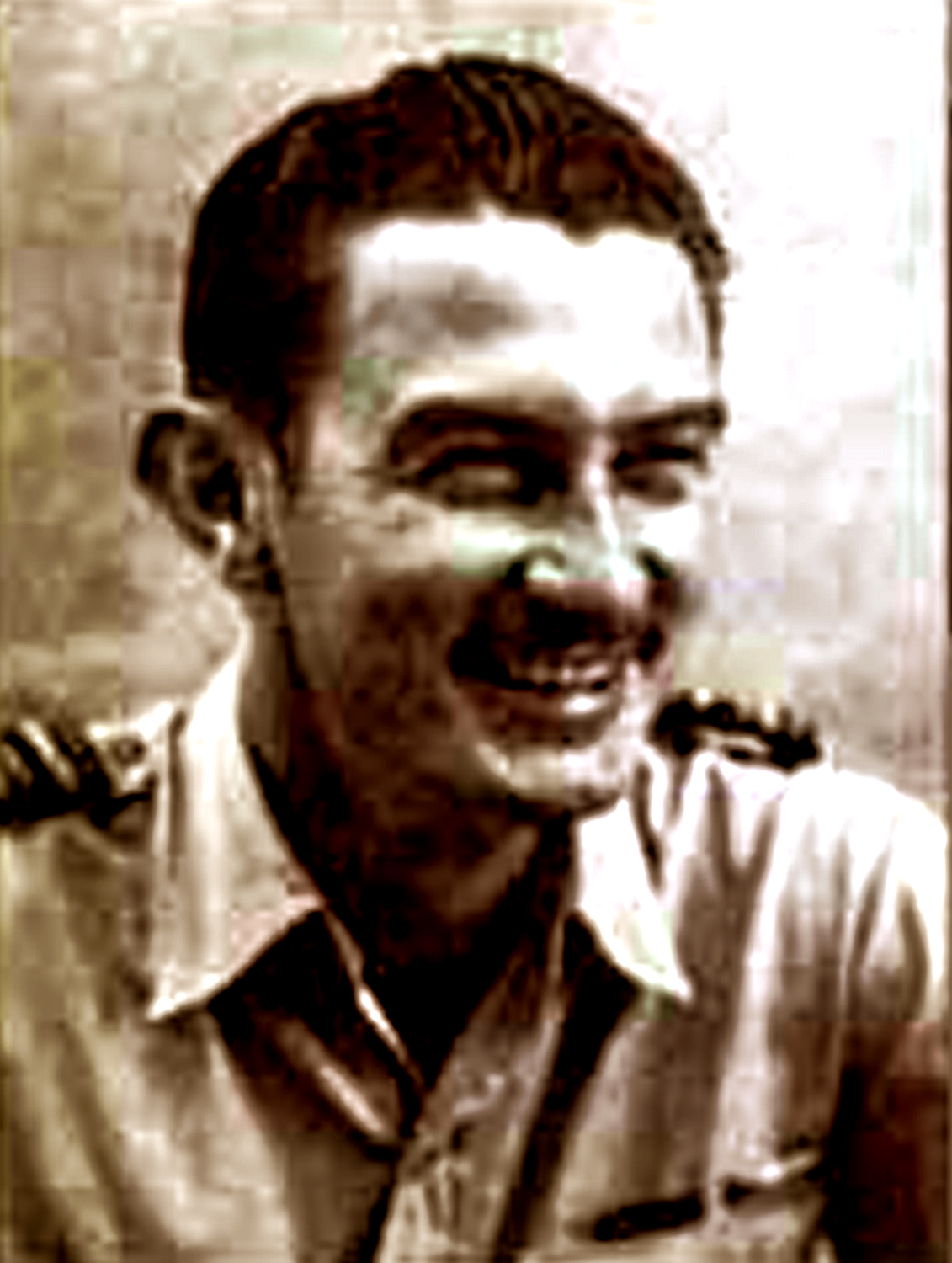
Jean Garcin, known as Commander Bayard

Fischer also recounted how the question of provisioning the maquisards was resolved:

The problem then was to ensure provisioning since we could not obtain weapons. This problem was solved thanks to the comrades I had known in Carpentras. They had all known me for almost three years. They trusted me, and when I explained what we were doing, I found an enthusiastic reception... So I asked the comrades, most of whom were peasants, to collect supplies. These were directed to the Maquis and through the channels, for the people who held these kinds of relay posts and who thus had to feed the young men in transit toward the Maquis were people of very small means, and moreover, provisions were extremely scarce at that time. We thus had fresh vegetables, some canned goods, we slaughtered donkeys and mules, and we fed them more or less adequately.

Food supplies were stored in an electrical transformer building and discreetly transported by Mr. Suau, a traveling cinema operator in the region. Along with film reels, he transported crates of provisions and delivered them to predetermined drop points known to members of the Maquis.

The issue of armament was addressed on 12 November 1942, when members of the Maquis Ventoux—assisted by a detachment from the Groupes Francs of Vaucluse, led by Jean Garcin (also known as Commander Bayard), ambushed and captured a German military truck transporting weapons and ammunition on the road between Carpentras and Sault. Between November 1942 and January 1943, approximately fifteen parachute drops were carried out in zones controlled by the Maquis Ventoux. These operations were coordinated by Maxime Fischer, with the assistance of André Fournel (of Sault) and Florent Piquet (of Le Barroux). The primary drop zones were: Ventilateur (7.5 km northeast of Sault), La Frache (1.5 km southwest of Brantes), and Champlong (south of Saint-Jean-de-Sault). The parachute drop at Champlong was preceded by a coded message broadcast via radio: “Like steel, copper shines.”

== The maquis attacked by the Italian army ==
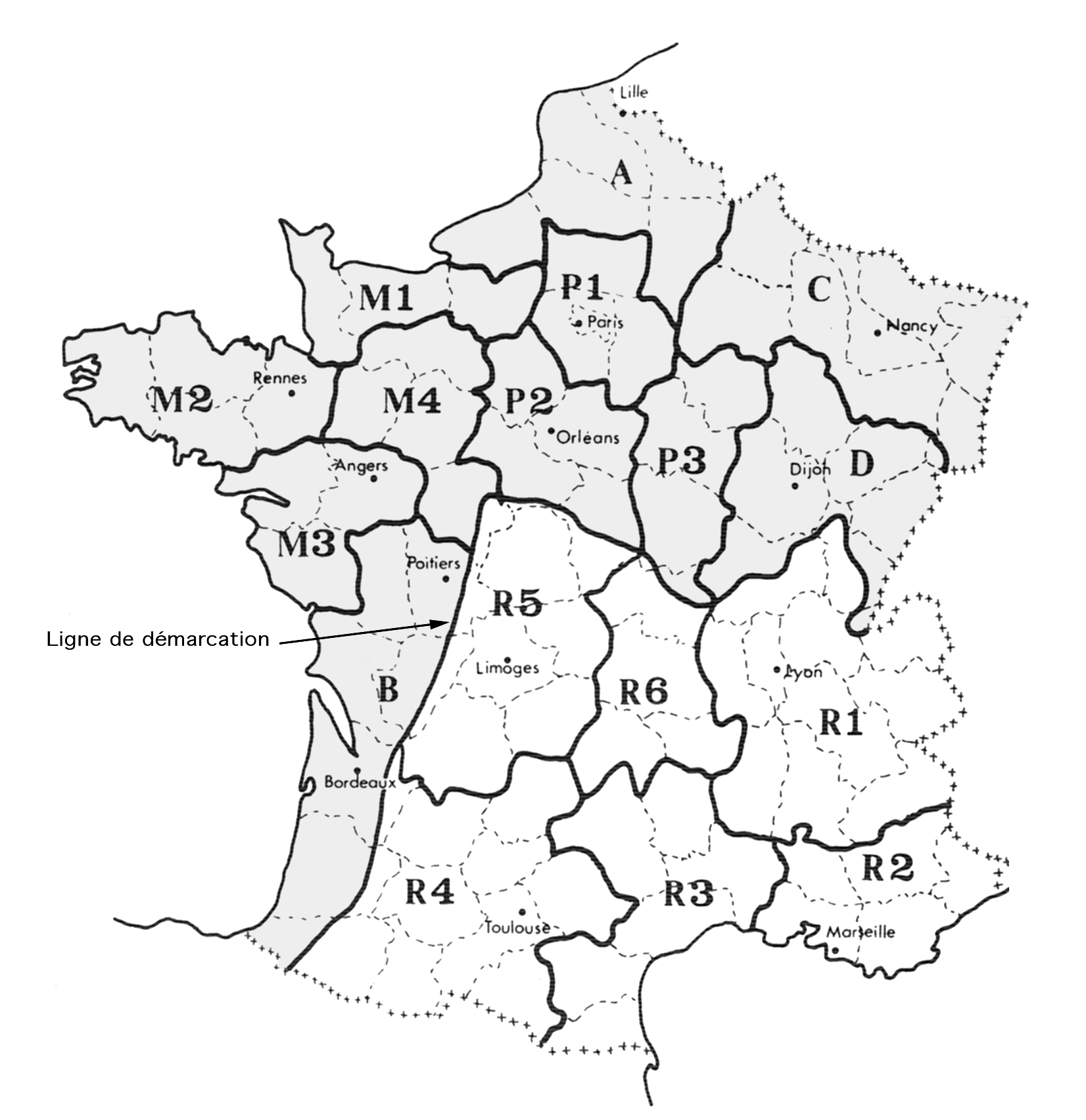
Geographical organization of the French Resistance

From 1943, the Resistance movement Combat, later incorporated into the Mouvements unis de la Résistance (MUR) and the Armée secrète (AS), took responsibility for organizing the Maquis Ventoux. The group maintained control over the Mont Ventoux massif and surrounding villages until the Liberation in 1944. In April 1943, the MUR executive committee officially appointed Colonel Philippe Beyne, known by the nom de guerre d’Artagnan, as leader of both the Maquis Ventoux and the Vaucluse section of the Armée secrète. On 14 June 1943, a detachment of the Italian Army launched an attack on a group of résistants located on the southern slopes of Mont Ventoux. By July 1943, the Maquis Ventoux had grown to approximately 230 fighters, organized into six separate groups.

== During the German occupation ==
In anticipation of Italy’s military collapse, German forces began replacing Italian units in southeastern France during mid-1943. On 20 July 1943, a German column engaged a unit of the Forces françaises de l’intérieur (FFI) in the commune of Buis-les-Baronnies. Following the Armistice of Cassibile on 8 September 1943, which marked the official surrender of Fascist Italy, the Italian Fourth Army withdrew from Provence, ceding full control of the region to the Wehrmacht. On 19 September 1943, a Gestapo agent conducting an investigation in Sault was seriously wounded by Resistance forces. The first recorded German reprisal against the Maquis Ventoux took place on 20 October 1943 near Lioux, where a German company attacked a Resistance unit entrenched at the Bourardière camp. On 20 November 1943, commandos from the Brandenburg Division, an elite German special operations unit, carried out an assault near the Château de Javon, located between Saint-Jean-de-Sault and Saint-Saturnin-lès-Apt. The operation resulted in four wounded maquisards and the capture of two others, who were later deported and died in captivity.

Site of the November 20, 1943 attack on the Resistance fighters

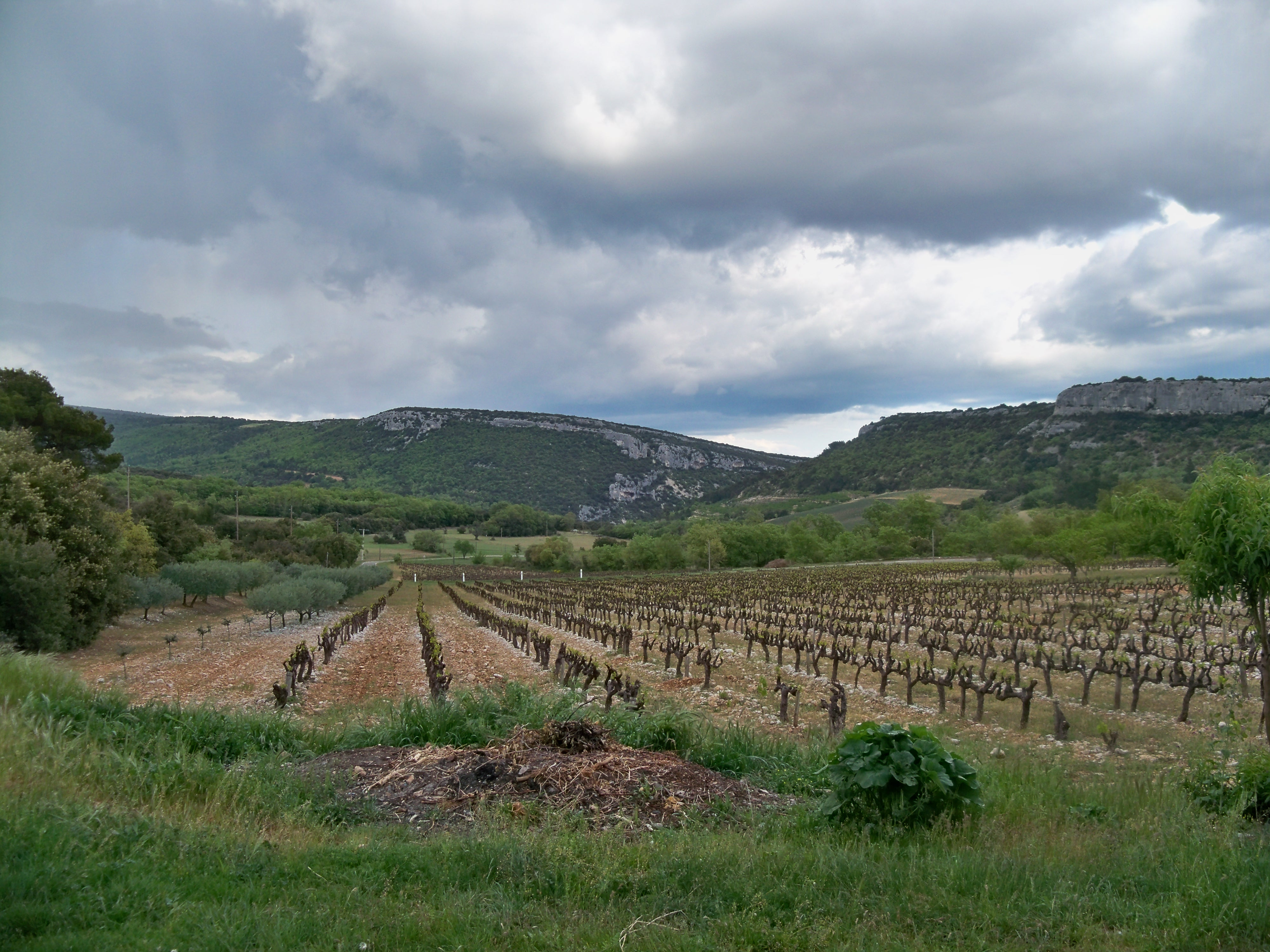
The site with its vineyard

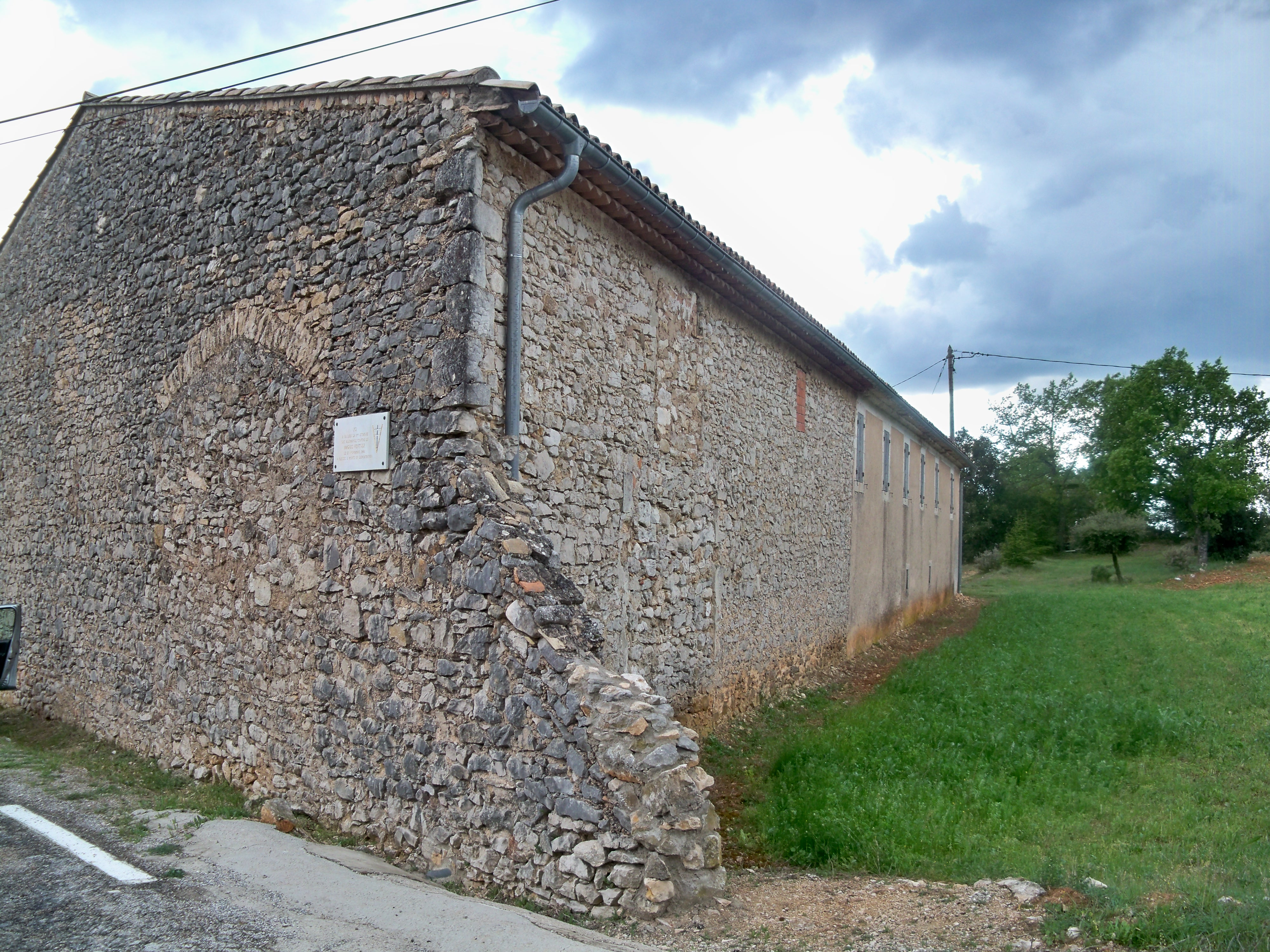
Resistance house

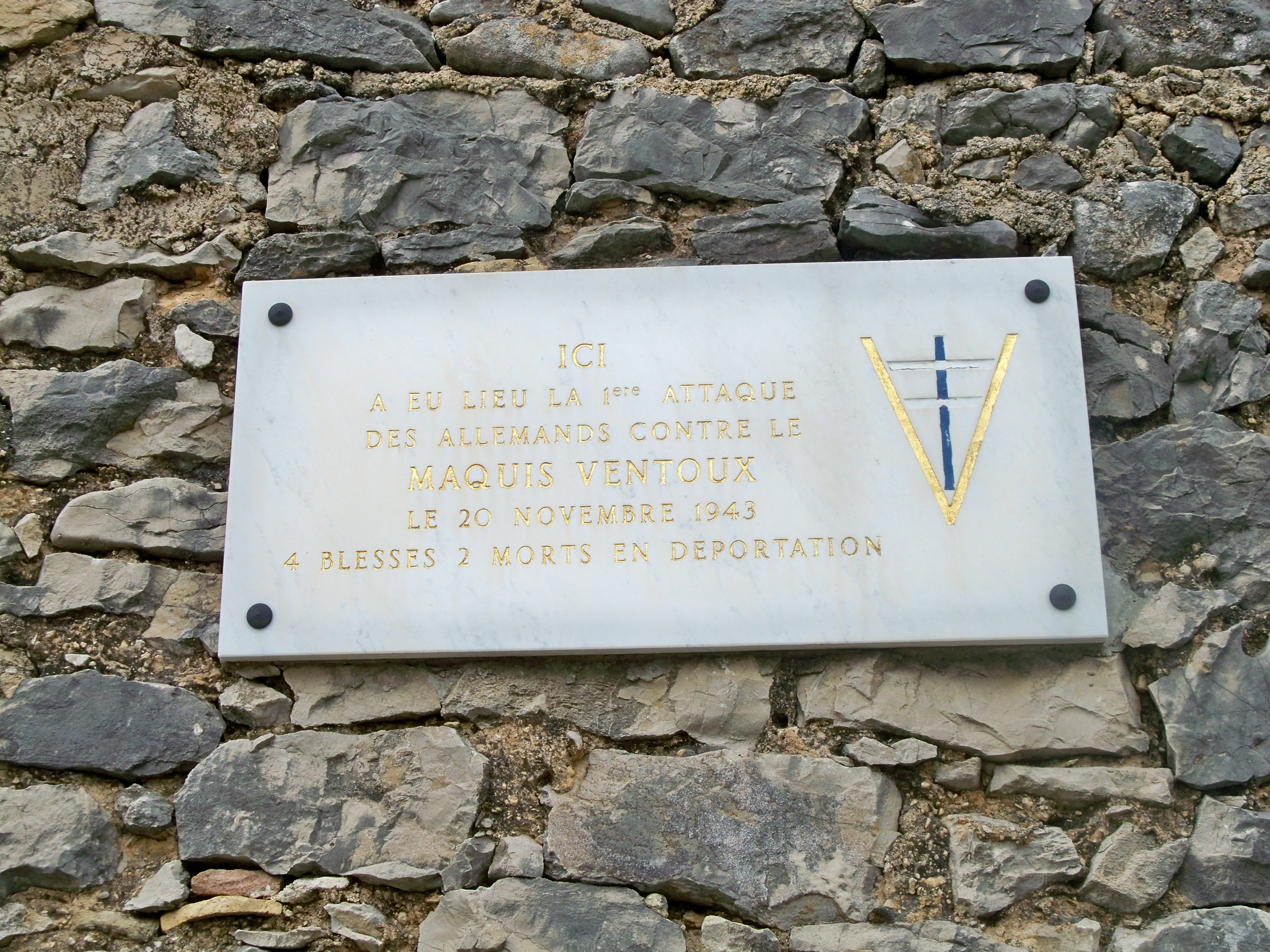
Commemorative plaque

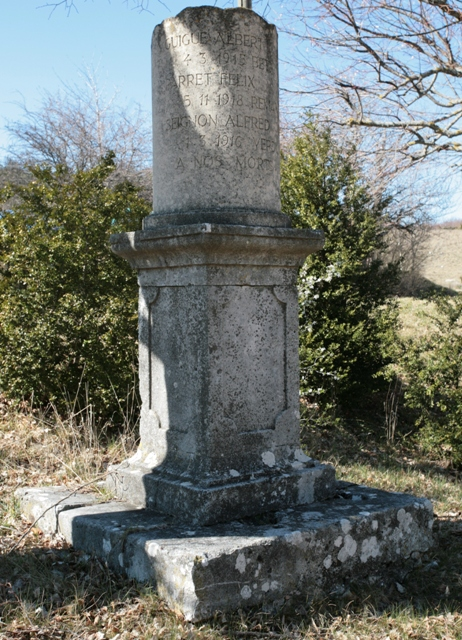
In Lagarde-d'Apt, a simple memorial stone commemorates the sacrifices of the Resistance fighters

Further clashes occurred on 10 January 1944 in Murs, where Resistance fighters engaged a German patrol. The skirmish led to casualties on both sides and the capture of several résistants. With weapons obtained through parachute drops during the winter of 1943–1944, the Maquis Ventoux intensified its sabotage efforts in the region. In February 1944, units from the Groupes francs of Vaucluse supported the Maquis Ventoux in ambushing a German military column on the road to Gabelle. On 7 April 1944, Fernand Jean, known as Junot, the head of the Section des atterrissages et parachutages (SAP) in Apt, coordinated the reception of a Jedburgh team at Lagarde-d’Apt. This Allied special operations unit, composed of officers from the United Kingdom, United States, and Free France, was commanded by British Colonel Graham and tasked with establishing contact with Colonel Beyne to support operations by the Maquis Ventoux.

== Losses of the maquis ==
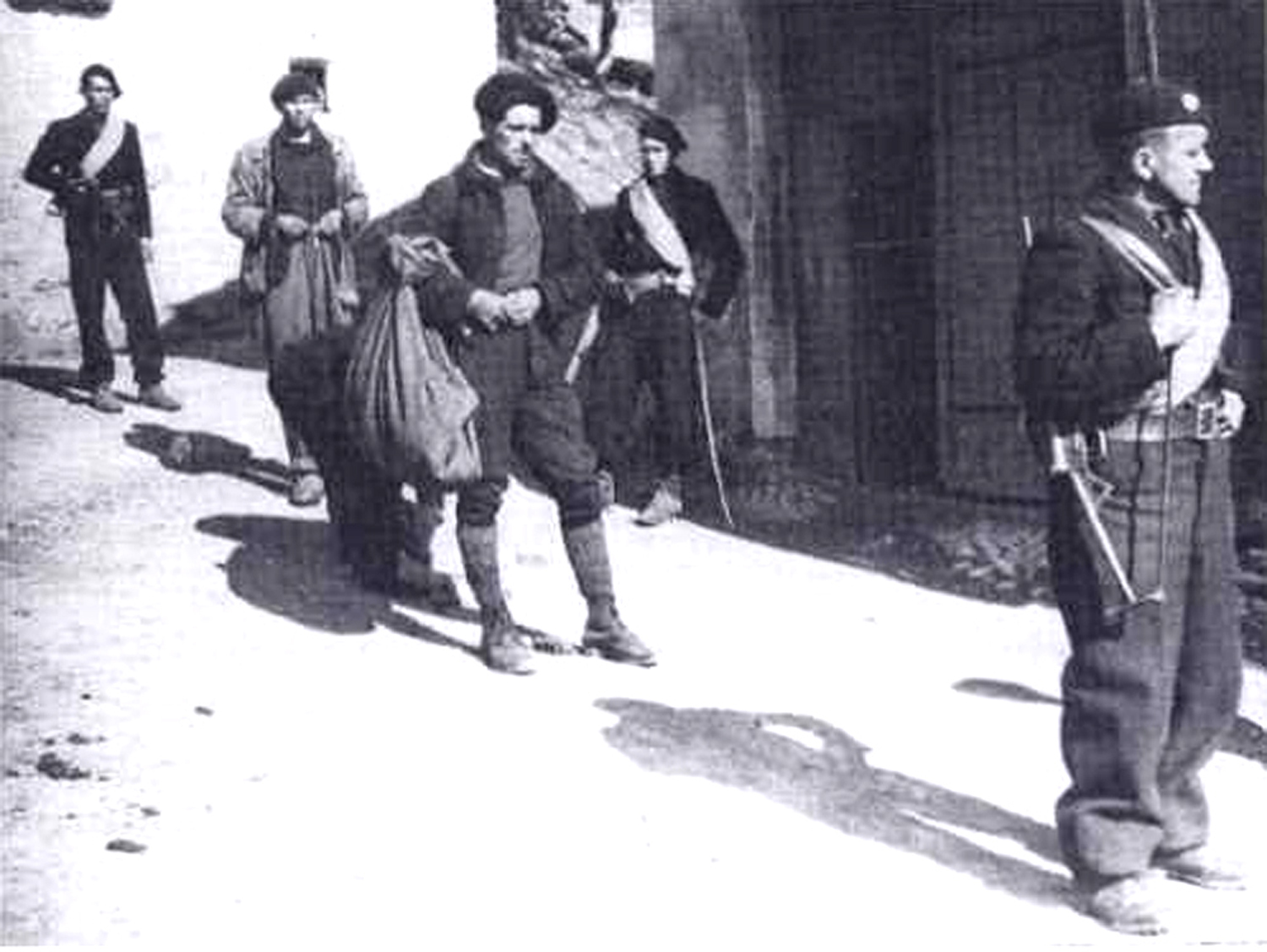
Arrest by the Militia of the resistance fighters of Izon la Bruisse on February 22, 1944

The increasing activity of the Maquis Ventoux prompted the German occupying forces to plan a counteroffensive in the Baronnies, where elements of the Resistance had been operating since late 1943. Anticipating a large-scale operation, Philippe Beyne and Maxime Fischer ordered the relocation of Resistance fighters on 21 February 1944 to the abandoned village of Izon-la-Bruisse in the Drôme department. The maquisards were reorganized into four sections under the command of Bruno Razzoli, known as Raymond Benoît. The Resistance units were strategically deployed across the mountainous terrain: the Monteau camp, led by Hautemer, was established near Eygalayes; the Kœnig camp, under the command of Jean-Paul Maugard (alias Marchal), was placed nearby; the third section, serving as the company headquarters, was located in Izon and commanded by Mistral; and the Forest House, positioned along the mountain ridge, was under the leadership of Verret. On the evening of 21 February, a force of approximately 260 German soldiers, supported by members of the Milice française, encircled the village of Séderon, blocked all routes leading to Izon-la-Bruisse, and prepared for an assault.

At dawn on 22 February 1944, German troops and militiamen launched a coordinated attack on the Resistance camps. According to a report submitted in June 1944 by Laurent Pascal (alias Rolland Perrin), one of the few survivors, two former Resistance members—Cyprien and Noiret—were seen collaborating with the SS during his interrogation. They allegedly identified the section leader Mistral, who was executed shortly thereafter.

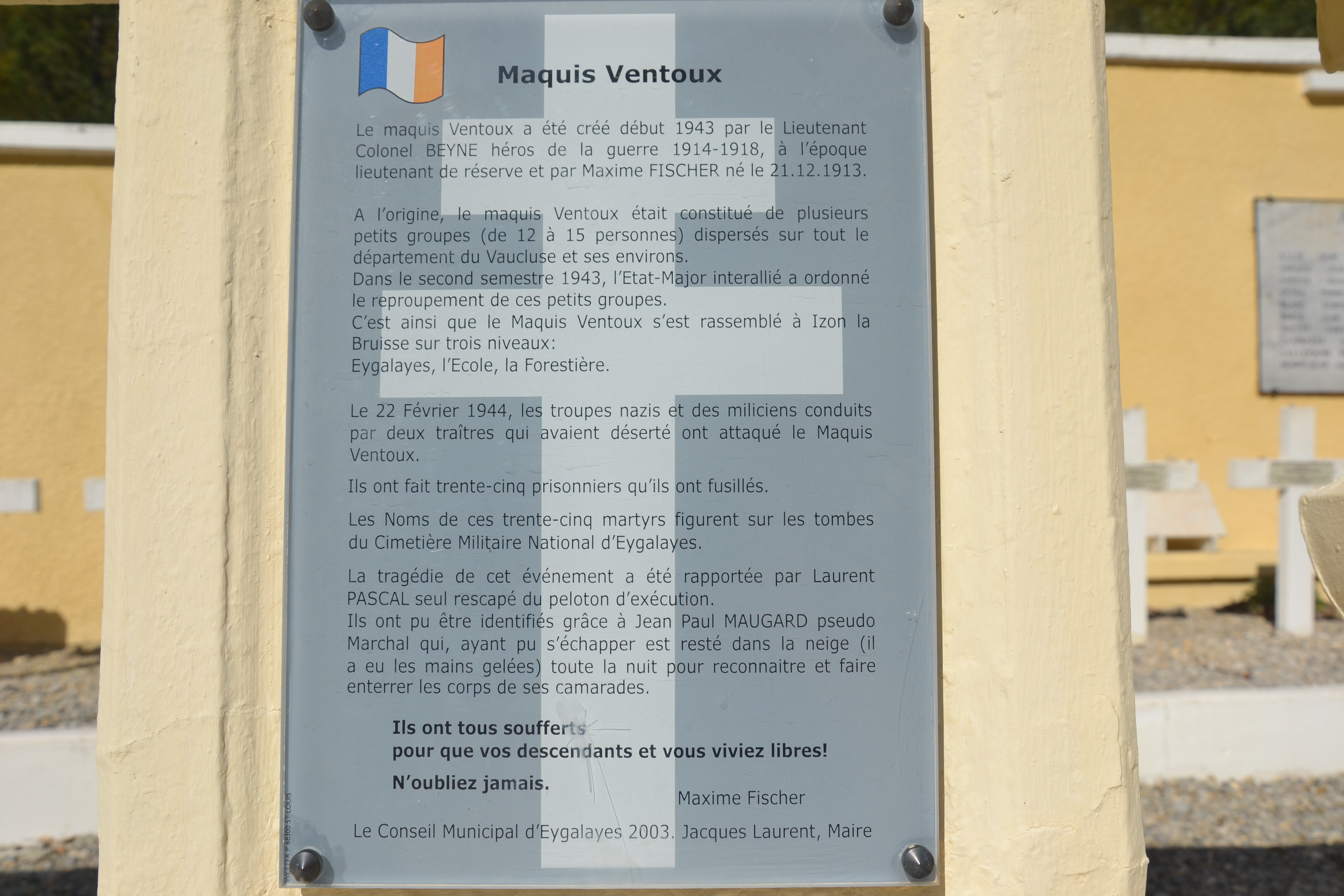
Brief account of events at the Eygalayes National Necropolis

Later that morning, around 10:00 a.m., the remaining captured fighters were transferred to Eygalayes, despite an attempted rescue by the nearby Forestière group. The prisoners were first brought to the Kœnig camp, then to the Monteau camp, where an estimated 200 SS soldiers and militiamen had gathered. At approximately 1:00 p.m., summary executions began. The Resistance fighters were taken in groups of four and shot. Pascal, who was in the final group along with Le Toubib, a Romanian Jewish doctor, and two other maquisards, later described the scene:

Arriving at the corner of the farm, I saw about twenty corpses; they were my comrades lying in the snow. Le Toubib, who was behind me, understood that I wanted to try something. He came closer to me and whispered: ‘This is the moment, Perrin, go for it.’ I rushed forward and heard my friend Blanchet, who had been shot but was not yet dead, shout to me as a good-luck wish, Merde Rolland. That cry went straight to my heart and gave me wings.

Pascal survived the execution attempt thanks to the intervention of Le Toubib, who shielded him from gunfire. The other two men in the group were killed during the escape attempt. Pascal reached the village of Ballons around 6:00 p.m., where he was sheltered by local residents and later transferred to a forest hut. There, he reunited with two Spanish maquisards stationed near Col Saint-Jean. With help from the local population, the three eventually made their way back to the Maquis Ventoux. According to subsequent Resistance accounts, Cyprien, originally from Loriol-du-Comtat, was later executed by the Maquis, while Noiret was allegedly killed by the SS. Both were reportedly paid 200,000 francs for their collaboration. The events of 22 February 1944 resulted in the execution of 35 maquisards, including three Resistance officers.

Repression in the Sault Plateau area continued in the months following the massacre. The local population had already been targeted by German authorities beginning on 6 June 1943, when the Gestapo conducted operations to apprehend individuals evading conscription under the Service du travail obligatoire (STO). A roundup against the maquisards followed on 20 October 1943. In the spring of 1944, large-scale German and Milice operations intensified across the region, particularly on the slopes of Mont Ventoux. Notable actions took place in Sault (3 March), Saint-Romain-en-Viennois (26 March), and Malaucène (6 May). The most significant of these operations occurred on 3 June 1944, when the town of Sault was encircled, its houses searched one by one, and dozens of residents were arrested by German forces.

== Organization of the FFI ==
A General Staff of the French Forces of the Interior (FFI) was established in London on February 1, 1944 to coordinate Resistance activities in France. For region R^{2}, Robert Rossi, known as Levallois, a graduate of the École Polytechnique and an aviation captain, was appointed head of the FFI on 1 May 1944. He confirmed Philippe Beyne as leader of the Ventoux Maquis and assigned him, as chief of staff, the task of organizing two FFI battalions in Vaucluse, a mission he carried out with Maxime Fischer.

FFI Organization Department of Vaucluse (May 1944)	Name	Pseudonym	Function or Profession	Rank	Origin
General Staff	Philippe Beyne; Maxime Fischer; Roger Louis; Yvon Brunel	d'Artagnan; Anatole ? ?	Colonel Captain; Captain; Captain	Sault; Paris; Paris; Paris	
Command Company	Frédéric Duriau; Laurent Privat; François Privat; Giacomini; Émile Génoyer; Jean-Paul Maugard; Bernusset; Bruno Razzoli; Felix Aubert	? ? ? ? ? Marchal ? Raymond Benoît; Francis	Student at the colonial School; Retired captain Retired lieutenant Reserve officer ? Commercial director Reserve naval officer CGT trade unionist ?	Paris; Avignon; Toulon; Belgique ? Paris ? Marseille; Villelaure	
1st Battalion	Bonfils; Larche	Le Pacha; Le loup	? State Councilor	Commandant; Captain	Buis-les-Baronnies; Paris
1st Company	Lucien Grangeon	Antoine	Regional Insurance Inspector	Captain	Vaison
2nd Company	Barthélemy RIQUE	Casimir	Customs Inspector	Captain	Marseille
3rd Company	Jules Marin	?	Reserve petty officer	Captain	?
4th Company	Robert Bourcart	?	Colonial administrator	Captain	Algeria
2nd Battalion	Juan Peylan	? ?	Reserve officer ?	Commandant Captain	Aix-en-Provence ?
5th Company	Yves Poirier	?	Retired commander	Captain	?
6th Company	Verret	?	Career military officer	Captain	?
7th Company	Jean-Marie Bicheron	?	?	Captain	Arles
8th Company	Saint-Clair	?	Commercial director	Captain	Aix-en-Provence
Air Force Detachment	Brossart; Michelet; Clément; Delaye; Roux; Aube; Clément	? ? ? ? ? ? ?	Retired Colonel ? Retired Colonel; Retired Lieutenant Colonel; Air Force Commander; Major of the Air Force Academy ?	Commandant; Captain; Captain; Captain; Lieutenant; Lieutenant; Lieutenant	Aix-en-Provence ? ? Carpentras; Aix-en-Provence; Salon ?

== The Ventoux maquis after the landings ==
Following the Allied landings in Normandy on 6 June 1944, the Resistance in the Mont Ventoux region resumed sabotage operations. Acting on directives from the Allied command, maquisard units also moved to occupy strategic towns and villages. On 8 June, German motorized units, accompanied by members of the Milice française, entered Malaucène and Beaumes-de-Venise. Their eventual withdrawal left nine dead and eight seriously wounded.

On the same day, Resistance fighters took control of Valréas, where they severed telecommunication lines, established roadblocks, and occupied key administrative buildings including the town hall, post office, and gendarmerie. The local gendarmerie surrendered their arms and joined the Forces Françaises de l’Intérieur (FFI).

On 9 and 11 June 1944, the Luftwaffe aircraft strafed Resistance barricades; one aircraft was shot down and another damaged by defensive fire. On 10 June, the 1st Company of the 1st Battalion, under the command of Lucien Grangeon, redeployed toward Vaison-la-Romaine. In retaliation, German troops searched rural farms, took approximately 100 hostages, and then withdrew after suffering 25 casualties (killed or wounded).

On 12 June 1944, after receiving intelligence about approaching German forces, FFI leaders informed Mayor Jules Niel of Valréas that they would withdraw to prevent reprisals. Resistance fighters began retreating toward Nyons shortly thereafter.

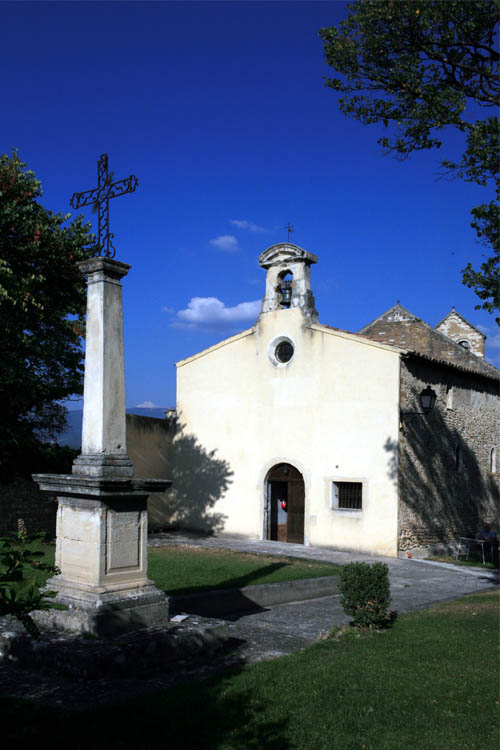
Chapel of the White Penitents in Valréas, where the bodies of those shot on June 12, 1944, were gathered.

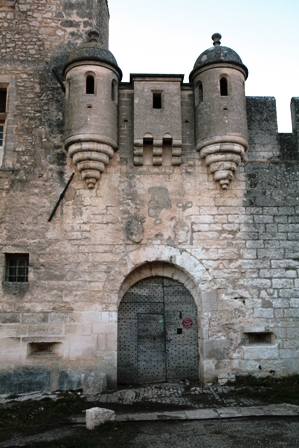
Javon Castle, one of the key sites of the Resistance in Vaucluse

At approximately 1:00 p.m., around 1,200 German troops surrounded and entered Valréas under heavy gunfire. Mayor Niel attempted to negotiate with the German commander, who reportedly threatened to destroy the town. Residents were ordered to gather in the town square, and at 4:30 p.m., a German officer—speaking through an interpreter—announced that searches would begin immediately. He warned that anyone found with weapons would be executed and that any form of resistance would result in the town’s destruction. During this time, several FTP (Francs-tireurs et partisans) fighters were captured while manning a roadblock near La Baume-de-Transit. They were brought to the square and lined up alongside 26 civilian hostages. As preparations for execution began, Mayor Niel intervened and managed to secure the release of some individuals. Nonetheless, 53 people were executed, with five others wounded, one of whom later died. Four survivors testified at the trial of Helmut Demetrio, one of the German officers implicated in the massacre, which took place before the Military Tribunal of Marseille in February 1951. Their testimony contributed to two historical studies—one in French and one in German. Before withdrawing, German forces ordered that the bodies remain exposed until the next morning. On 13 June, the Chapel of the White Penitents was used to lay out the coffins. On 15 June at 6:30 a.m., the coffins were transported to the cemetery in a solemn procession involving seven carts, family members, Mayor Niel, and his deputies.

Confronted by repeated German operations, the Maquis Ventoux suffered significant losses. Their strength declined from 130 fighters in December 1943 to 87 by February 1944, and by mid-June, only 30 armed maquisards remained entrenched in the Baronnies. However, following German setbacks in Normandy, the maquis experienced a resurgence, bolstered by an influx of new recruits, including many gendarmes. In July 1944, an inter-Allied mission was deployed to Vaucluse, led by Commander Gonzague Corbin de Mangoux (alias Amict) and Major John Goldsmith, with the objective of improving coordination between the FFI, FTP, and Francs-tireurs units. One such group, linked to the Cammaert units and based in Saint-Christol, was commanded by Louis Malarte (alias Paulo), a dentist from Avignon.

Corbin de Mangoux arrived on 12 July 1944 aboard a Lysander aircraft and later landed in a Spitfire on an improvised airstrip south of Sault. He was received by Camille Rayon, alias Archiduc, an SAP agent known as Jean-Pierre (JP). On 19 July, Major Paul Émile Labelle (alias Nartex), a Canadian officer, was parachuted in alongside two French agents—Robert Charles Boucart (alias Hors-bord) and René L. Hébert (alias Corvette). The French agents joined the maquis, while Major Labelle remained with Rayon. In his report, Corbin de Mangoux praised the organization established by Colonel Beyne:

In this region, about 1,000 maquisards were under the direction of Lieutenant Colonel Philippe Beyne, former tax collector of Sault and reserve officer of the famous regiment of the Red Devils, the 152nd Infantry Regiment of Colmar, who, with his deputy Max Fischer, had organized the Ventoux Maquis into groups that could be counted among the best equipped and best trained in the Vaucluse department.

By July 1944, the strengthened Ventoux Maquis had reasserted control over access to the Ventoux massif. In early August, the maquis launched attacks against units of the 11th Panzer Division, stationed in the Rhône Valley.

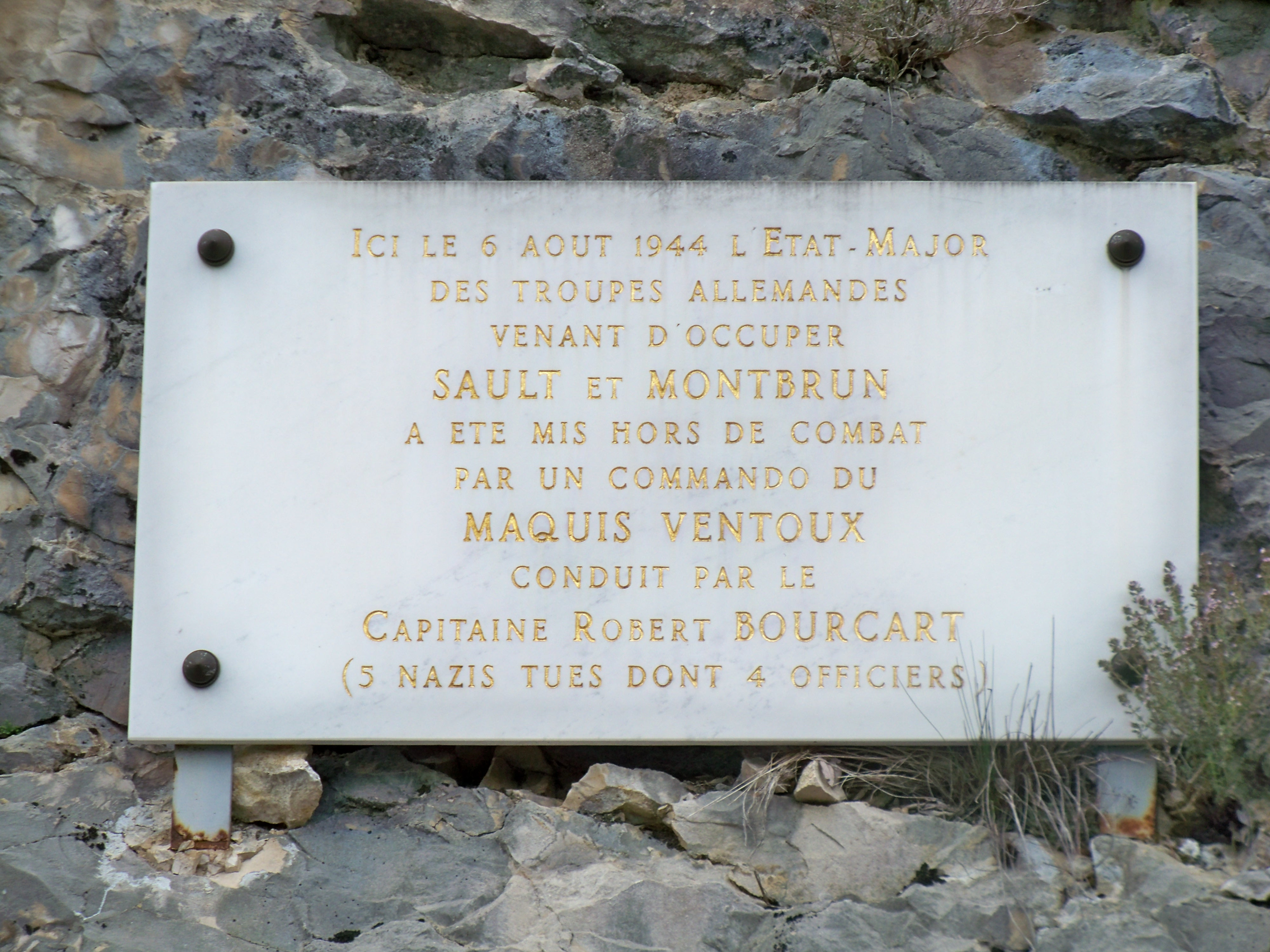
Commemorative plaque marking the first attack by the Ventoux resistance against a German column on August 5, 1944

A skirmish on 5 August 1944, near the road to Sault, led by the 4th Company under Captain Robert Bourcart, resulted in the deaths of five German soldiers, including four officers. On 8 August, larger engagements took place: one at Montbrun-les-Bains under Lucien Grangeon, which reportedly left approximately 120 German soldiers dead; and another near the Château de Javon, under Félix Aubert. On 7 August, FFI intelligence had reported the movement of a German column from Apt expected to take the RN 543 toward Sault. In response, Colonel Beyne ordered an ambush 2 km south of the Château de Javon. The Resistance, equipped with grenades, four machine guns, and sixteen light machine guns, attacked the convoy, immobilizing its lead vehicles. A counterattack by a truck-mounted gun was neutralized with grenades. The battle lasted approximately 12 minutes, resulting in an estimated 250 German casualties, significant equipment loss, and six wounded maquisards, who withdrew with all their materiel intact.

In reprisal, German forces executed five hostages in Sault on 11 August 1944.

The Allied landing in Provence occurred on 15 August, and on 18 August, the Ventoux Maquis made contact with an American reconnaissance patrol in Banon (Alpes-de-Haute-Provence). A coordinated plan of action followed, with maquisards engaging German forces retreating through Bédoin and Mollans from 20 August onward.

On 22 August, two major operations were launched. Lucien Grangeon's unit ambushed a German company near Le Barroux, an action for which the unit was later awarded the Croix de guerre on August 25. Simultaneously, a Wehrmacht column traveling on the Route nationale 100 from Avignon to Digne, redirected via RN 143 after encountering FFI roadblocks. The rerouting was reported by locals in Apt to Resistance forces stationed in Saint-Jean-de-Sault.

This section of the Ventoux Maquis, composed of French Air Force officers and non-commissioned officers, organized an ambush in the gorges 2.5 km north of the hamlet. The attack inflicted 110 German fatalities. Afterward, the surviving German troops resumed their retreat but left behind wounded and disabled personnel, who were captured on 25 August and transferred to Sorgues. The operations of the Maquis Ventoux concluded following the liberation of Vaison-la-Romaine by Allied forces on 26 August 1944.

== Places of remembrance ==
Sites of remembrance commemorating the actions of the Maquis Ventoux and the deaths of 353 resistance members are located across the departments of Drôme and Vaucluse:

- Eygalayes (Drôme):
  - National necropolis,
  - The stele in memory of the 35 executed on February 22, 1944;
- Sault (Vaucluse): memorial of the Maquis Ventoux;
- Valréas (Vaucluse): wall of the executed.
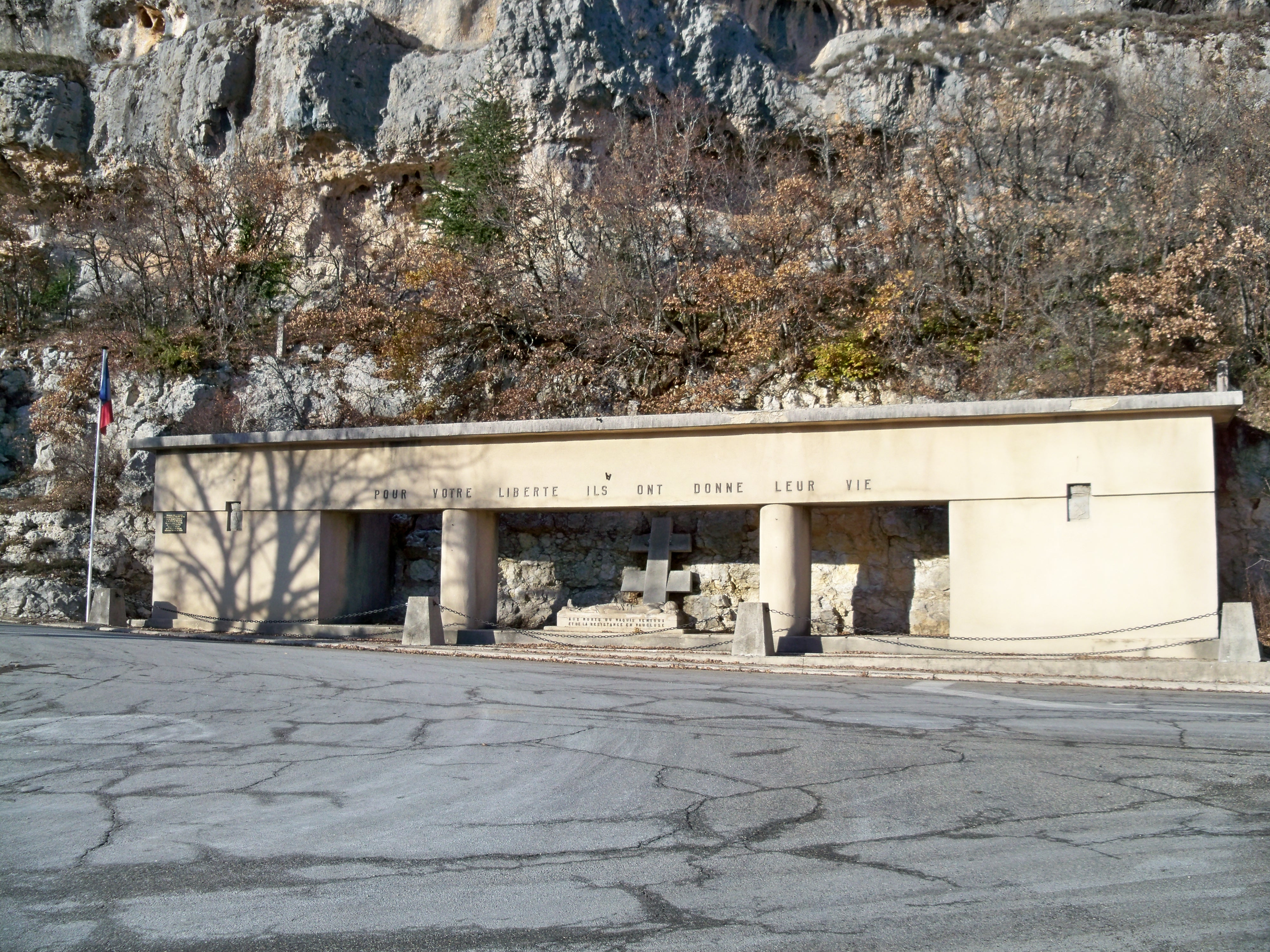
Ventoux Maquis Memorial in Sault

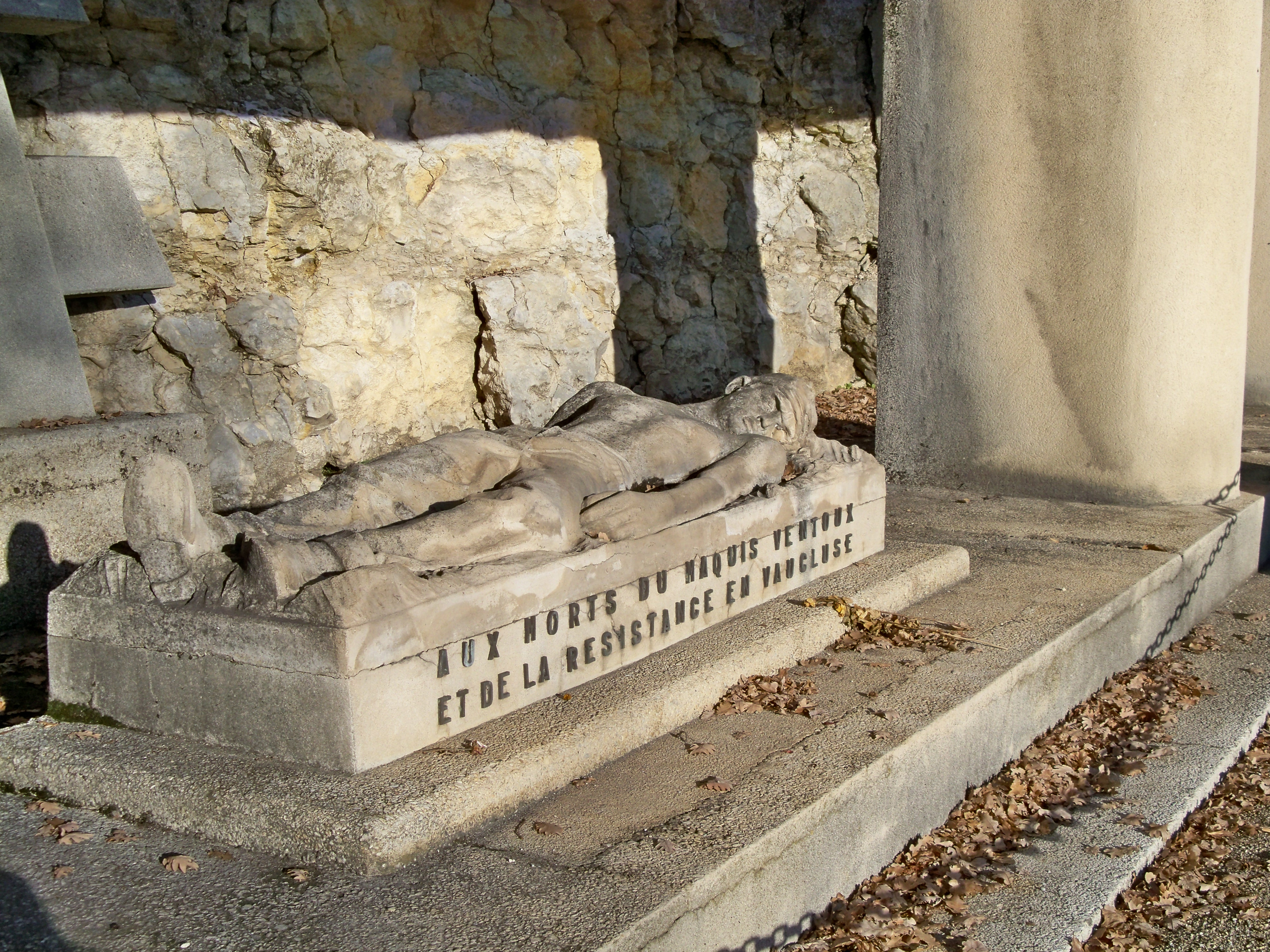
Recumbent statue at the Ventoux Maquis Memorial in Sault

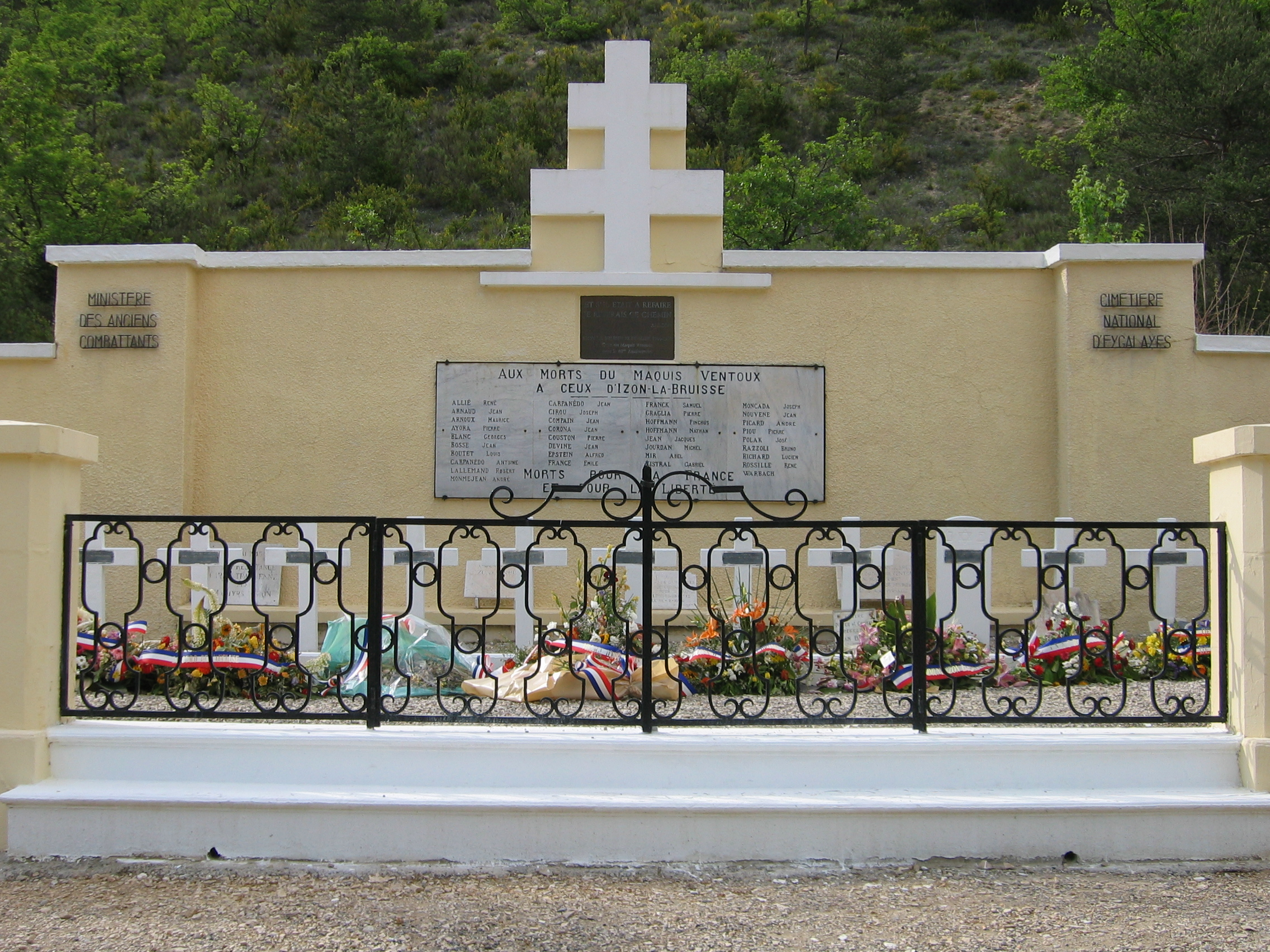
Eygalayes National Necropolis

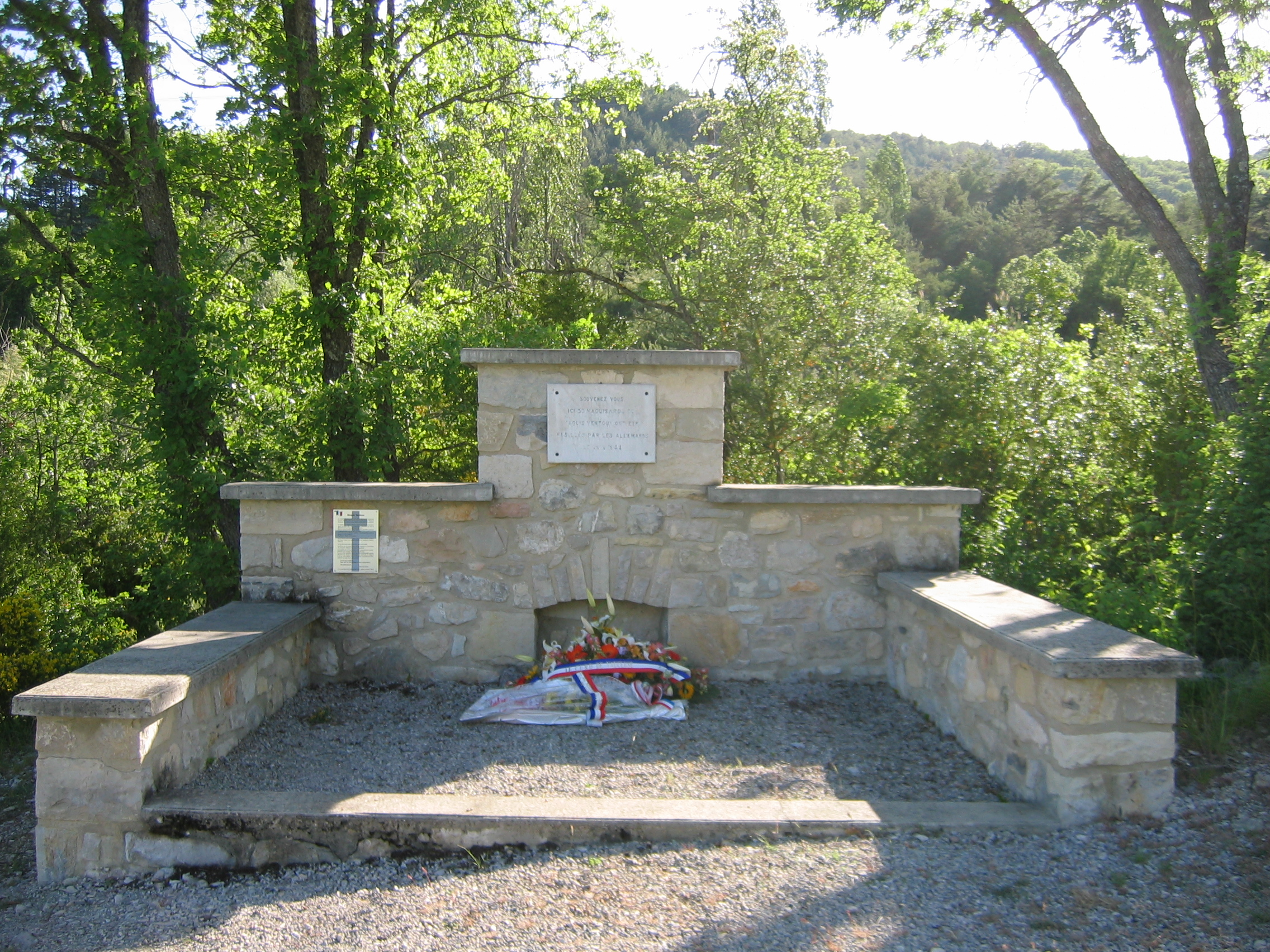
Stele in memory of those shot at the execution site

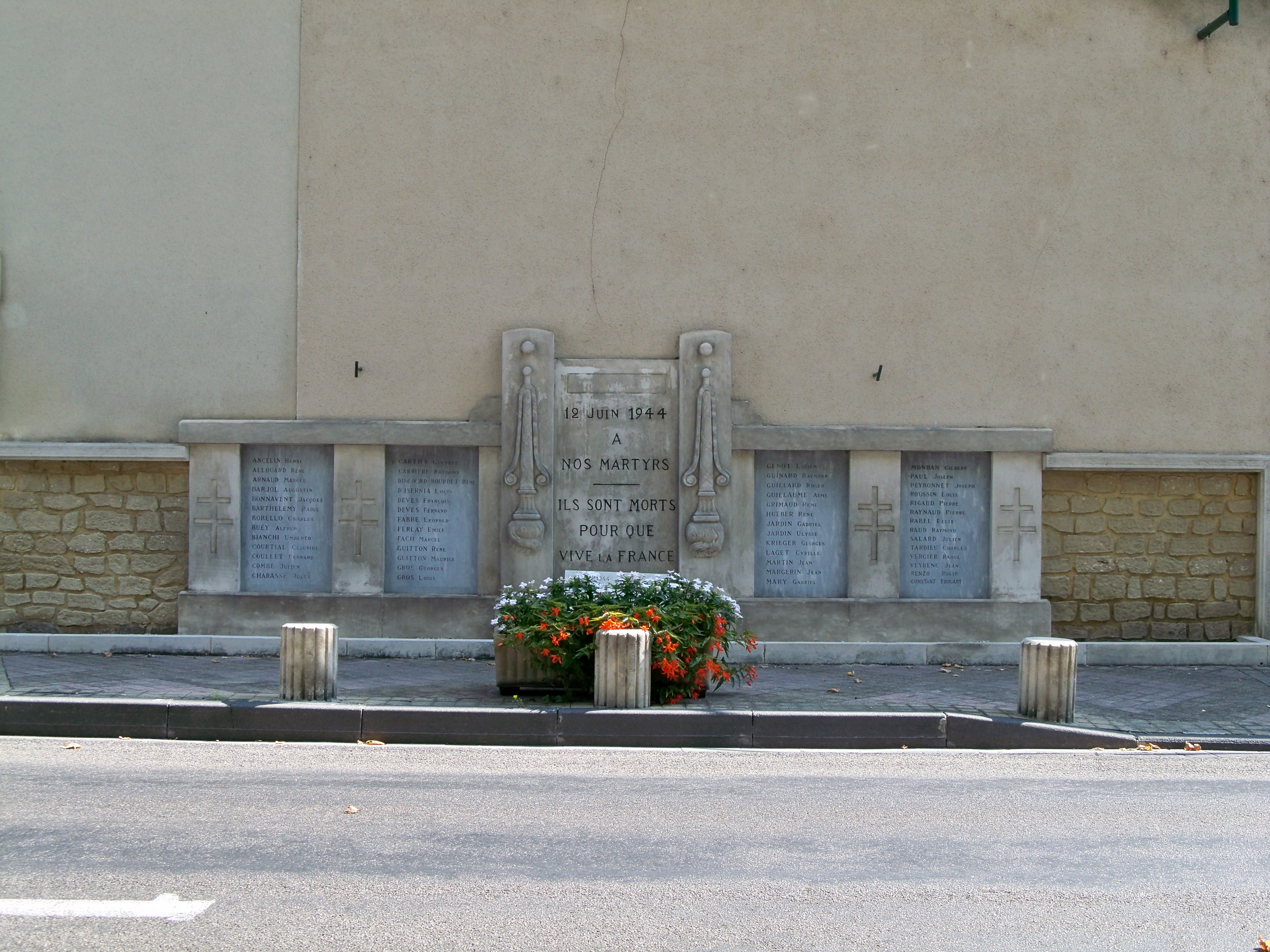
Commemorative plaque on the wall of those shot in Valréas

The commune of Sault was awarded the Croix de guerre 1939–1945 with vermeil star, accompanied by an official citation:

Witnessed the birth of the maquis in Vaucluse to which its population gave the fullest support, its valiant mountain population demonstrated under the occupation the finest qualities of courage and self-sacrifice. With a rebellious spirit, it gave itself body and soul to the Resistance; despite the presence of a German garrison and regardless of the risks taken, it fought the enemy mercilessly. Attacked three times, bombed twice, it knew, despite its losses and destructions, how to preserve an unshakable faith in victory. Twenty of its sons were killed, thirty-two wounded, forty-two arrested, five deported for the liberation of the soil of the fatherland.

== See also ==
- Maquis (World War II)
- Provence
- Vallée du Rhône (France)
- French Forces of the Interior

== Bibliography ==
=== Monograph ===
- Lamy, Edmond (1946). La Fusillade du 12 juin 1944 à Valréas [The Shooting of June 12, 1944, in Valréas] (in French). Valréas: Imprimerie Coste Frères.
- Autrand, Aimé (1965). Le département de Vaucluse de la défaite à la Libération (mai 1940-25 août 1944) [The Vaucluse department from defeat to liberation (May 1940–August 25, 1944)] (in French). Avignon: Aubanel.
- Rochat, Claude-France (1980). La Résistance en Vaucluse. Documents et témoignages [The Resistance in Vaucluse. Documents and testimonies] (in French). Service éducatif des Archives Départementales de Vaucluse et Centre départemental de documentation pédagogique.
- Coste, Louis (1982). La Résistance au pays d'Apt, de la Durance au Ventoux. Historique [The Resistance in the Apt region, from the Durance to the Ventoux. History] (in French). Cavaillon: Imprimerie Mistral.
- Aliquot, Hervé (1987). Le Vaucluse dans la guerre 1939-1945. La vie quotidienne sous l'occupation [The Vaucluse during the 1939-1945 war. Daily life under occupation] (in French). Saint-Étienne: Éd. Horvath.
- Jean, Fernand (1987). J'y étais. Récits inédits sur la Résistance au pays d'Apt [I was there. Unpublished accounts of the Resistance in the Apt region] (in French). Cavaillon: Publication de l’Association des Médaillés de la Résistance de Vaucluse.
- Bourcart, Robert (1990). L'embuscade de Saint-Saturnin-d'Apt. Contribution à l'histoire du maquis Ventoux [The ambush at Saint-Saturnin-d'Apt. Contribution to the history of the Ventoux Maquis] (in French). Annecy: Publication de l’Association des Médaillés de la Résistance de Vaucluse.
- Pascal, Laurent. La Destruction du Maquis Ventoux. Izon-la-Bruisse – 22 février 1944 in « Almanach du combattant 1992 » [The Destruction of the Ventoux Maquis. Izon-la-Bruisse – February 22, 1944 in “Almanach du combattant 1992” (1992 Combatant's Almanac)] (in French). Verdun: Comité National du Souvenir de Verdun.
- Arnoux, Claude (1994). Maquis Ventoux, Résistance et répression en Provence pendant la IIe Guerre mondiale [Maquis Ventoux, Resistance and Repression in Provence during World War II] (in French). Avignon: Éd. Aubanel.
- Garcin, Jean (1996). Nous étions des terroristes [We were terrorists] (in French). Avignon: Éd. A. Barthélémy. ISBN 2-87923-074-8.
- Barruol, Guy; Dautier, Nerte; Mondon, Bernard (2007). Le mont Ventoux. Encyclopédie d'une montagne provençale [Mont Ventoux. Encyclopedia of a Provençal mountain] (in French). Forcalquier: Alpes de Lumières. ISBN 978-2-906162-92-1.

=== Commemorative plaque ===
- Maquis Ventoux, Publication à l'occasion de la commémoration des combats et de l'inauguration du monument à la mémoire du maquis Ventoux et des 353 morts du Vaucluse [Maquis Ventoux, Publication commemorating the battles and inauguration of the monument in memory of the Maquis Ventoux and the 353 dead of Vaucluse] (in French). 1956.
- 12 juin 1944. 53 fusillés à Valréas. Récits et témoignages [June 12, 1944. 53 people shot in Valréas. Accounts and testimonies] (in French) (5 ed.). Publication de l'Association cantonale des familles de fusillés, des déportés et internés, résistants et patriotes de l’Enclave de Valréas. 2001.
- Widerstand gegen die Wehrmacht: Hergang und Hintergründe der ErschieBungen vom 12. Juni 1944 in Valréas (Résistance contre la Wehrmacht : la fusillade du 12 juin 1944 à Valréas) [Resistance against the Wehrmacht: Course of events and background to the shootings of June 12, 1944, in Valréas (Résistance contre la Wehrmacht: la fusillade du 12 juin 1944 à Valréas)] (in German). Publication de l'Association cantonale des familles de fusillés, des déportés et internés, résistants et patriotes de l’Enclave de Valréas. 2004.
- La Mémoire gravée. Monuments, stèles et plaques commémoratives de la Seconde Guerre mondiale dans le département de Vaucluse [Engraved Memory. Monuments, memorial stones, and commemorative plaques from World War II in the department of Vaucluse] (in French). L'Isle-sur-la-Sorgue: Publication de l'Association des amis du Musée de la Résistance et de la Déportation. 2002.
- Vaucluse 44, l'année de la liberté retrouvée. Aspects de la Résistance et de la Libération [Vaucluse 44, the year freedom was regained. Aspects of the Resistance and Liberation] (in French). Avignon: Publication du service départemental de l'Office National des Anciens Combattants de Vaucluse, Mission du 60e anniversaire des débarquements et de la libération de la France. 2004.
