= Stade Français Paris in cup finals =

This article contains the record of Stade Français Paris rugby union club in championship and cup finals.

== French championship ==
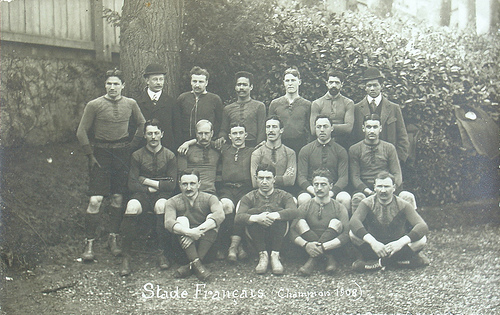
The 1908 champions.

Date	Winner	Runner-up	Score	Venue	Attendance
20 March 1892	Racing Club de France	Stade Français	4-3	Bagatelle, Paris	2,000
19 May 1893	Stade Français	Racing Club de France	7-3	Bécon-les-Bruyères	1,200
18 March 1894	Stade Français	Inter NOS	18-0	Bécon-les-Bruyères	1,500
17 March 1895	Stade Français	Olympique de Paris	16-0	Vélodrome, Courbevoie	
5 April 1896	Olympique de Paris	Stade Français	12-0	Vélodrome, Courbevoie	
1897	Stade Français	Olympique de Paris			
1898	Stade Français	Racing Club de France			
30 April 1899	Stade Bordelais UC	Stade Français	5-3	Route du Médoc, Le Bouscat	3,000
31 March 1901	Stade Français	Stade Bordelais UC	0-3	Route du Médoc, Le Bouscat	
26 April 1903	Stade Français	SOE Toulouse	16-8	Prairie des Filtres, Toulouse	5,000
27 March 1904	Stade Bordelais UC	Stade Français	3-0	La Faisanderie, Saint-Cloud	2,000
16 April 1905	Stade Bordelais UC	Stade Français	12-3	Route du Médoc, Le Bouscat	6,000
8 April 1906	Stade Bordelais UC	Stade Français	9-0	Parc des Princes, Paris	4,000
24 March 1907	Stade Bordelais UC	Stade Français	14-3	Route du Médoc, Le Bouscat	12,000
5 April 1908	Stade Français	Stade Bordelais UC	16-3	Colombes	10,000
29 May 1927	Stade Toulousain	Stade Français	19-9	Stade des Ponts Jumeaux, Toulouse	20,000
16 May 1998	Stade Français	USA Perpignan	34-7	Stade de France, Saint-Denis	78,000
15 July 2000	Stade Français	US Colomiers	28-23	Stade de France, Saint-Denis	78,000
7 June 2003	Stade Français	Stade Toulousain	32-18	Stade de France, Saint-Denis	78,000
26 June 2004	Stade Français	USA Perpignan	38-20	Stade de France, Saint-Denis	79,722
11 June 2005	Biarritz Olympique	Stade Français	37-34 AP	Stade de France, Saint-Denis	79,475
9 June 2007	Stade Français	ASM Clermont Auvergne	23-18	Stade de France, Saint-Denis	79,524
13 June 2015	Stade Français	ASM Clermont Auvergne	12-6	Stade de France, Saint-Denis	79,000

== Heineken Cup ==
Date	Winner	Runner-up	Score	Venue	Attendance
19 May 2001	Leicester Tigers	Stade Français	34-30	Parc des Princes, Paris	44,000
22 May 2005	Stade Toulousain	Stade Français	18-12 a.e.t.	Murrayfield, Edinburgh	51,326

== European Challenge Cup ==
Date	Winner	Runner-up	Score	Venue	Attendance
20 May 2011	Harlequins	Stade Français	19–18	Cardiff City Stadium, Cardiff	TBC
12 May 2017	Stade Français	Gloucster	25-17	Murrayfield Stadium, Edinburgh	24,494

== Coupe de France ==
Year	Winner	Score	Runner-up
1998	Stade Toulousain	22-15	Stade Français
1999	Stade Français	27-19	CS Bourgoin-Jallieu

== Coupe de l'Espérance ==
Date	Winner	Score	Runner-up
1916	Stade Toulousain	8-0	Stade Français
