= Alsace-Lorraine Independent Brigade (France) =

Brigade Alsace-Lorraine
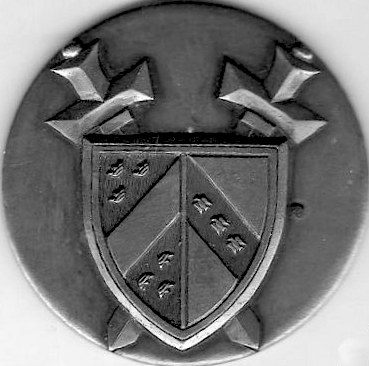
- Insignia of the Brigade Alsace-Lorraine
- Active: September 1944 – March 1945
- Country: France
- Allegiance: FFI
- Type: Light Infantry
- Nickname: Brigade Malraux
- Engagements: Vosges 1944; Strasbourg 1945

Commanders
- Notable commanders: André Malraux

The Alsace-Lorraine Independent Brigade (French: Brigade indépendante Alsace-Lorraine; BIAL), usually known as the Alsace-Lorraine Brigade or sometimes as the Brigade Malraux, was a French Forces of the Interior (FFI) unit that fought alongside regular French Army forces in World War II during the closing months of 1944 and early 1945.

== History ==
Formed in September 1944 by André Malraux, the brigade comprised approximately 1,000 men organized into three battalions named for the cities of Metz, Mulhouse, and Strasbourg. Malraux's achievement in organizing this brigade was noteworthy in that few brigade-sized units of FFI men were organized at all, and his was one of the brigades that retained the longest an organization independent from that of the French regular army. Although the men of the brigade were highly motivated, many were not military veterans and the unit was equipped with a mixture of Allied and German weapons and material.

Despite these disadvantages, the brigade compiled a good combat record. Not assigned permanently to a division, the brigade was part of the army reserve of General Jean de Lattre de Tassigny's French First Army, and as such, was assigned as a reinforcement unit to various regular French divisions. From 26 September to 16 October 1944, the brigade fought in the vicinity of Thillot, east of Mulhouse. In November 26-27, 1944, the brigade fought with the French 5th Armored Division to liberate the town of Dannemarie in the Vosges Mountains. Subsequently, Malraux personally led the brigade's assault on the nearby town of Ballersdorf.

In January 1945, the brigade took part in the defense of Strasbourg during the German Nordwind offensive. During this action, 140 men of the brigade were encircled for three days from January 8-10 in Gerstheim, south of Strasbourg. On the afternoon of January 10, the Gerstheim garrison was assaulted by 10 Tiger tanks and two infantry companies, forcing the garrison to withdraw during the night after losing 40 men. On February 27, 1945, the troops of the brigade were directed to enter regular service as part of the French 14th Infantry Division. On March 22, the brigade left the lines of the French 9th Colonial Division to form the 3rd Demi-Brigade of Chasseurs, ending the independent history of the Brigade Alsace-Lorraine.

== Staff and organization ==
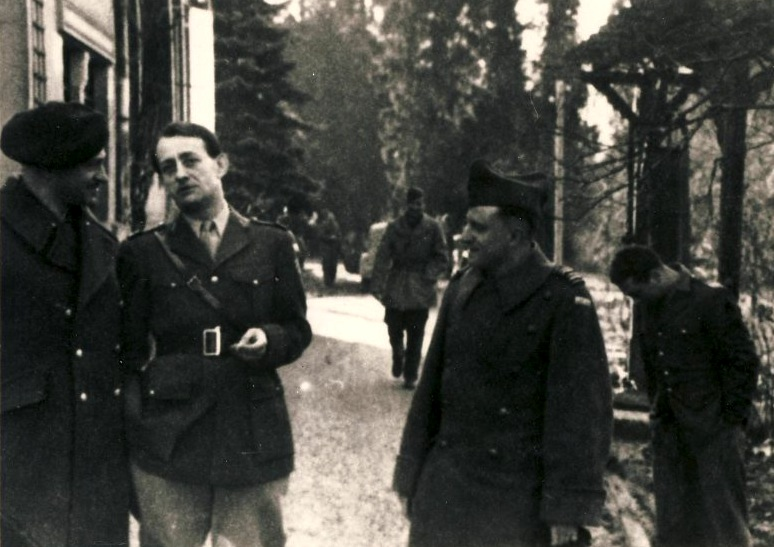
André Malraux as commander of the Alsace-Lorraine Brigade, Winter 1944-45.

Flash of the Brigade Alsace-Lorraine

- Commander: Colonel André Malraux
- Deputy commander: Lieutenant-colonel Pierre-Elie Jacquot
- Chief of Staff: Commandant Brandstetter
- Chaplain: Abbé Pierre Bockel

The Metz Battalion was made up of resistance fighters from Aquitaine (Gers, Haute-Garonne, Hautes-Pyrénées, Landes, Lot, Pyrénées-Atlantiques, and Tarn-et-Garonne). Not included in the integration of the brigade with the 9th Colonial Division, the Metz Battalion was not disbanded until May 28, 1947.

Commander: Pleis

- Iéna Company: Captain Argence
- Kléber Company: Captain Linder
- Ney Company: Captain Bijon
- Rapp Company: Captain Edmond Fischer

The Mulhouse Battalion was made up of resistance fighters from Savoie and from Haute-Savoie.

Commander: Dopff

- Vieil-Armand Company: Captain François Lehn
- Donon Company: Captain Schuhmacher
- Belfort Company: Commandant Dufay

The Strasbourg Battalion was made up of resistance fighters from Dordogne.

Commander: Antoine Diener-Ancel

- Verdun Company: Captain Figuères
- Valmy Company: Captain Gandouin
- Bark Company: Captain Gossot (Bir-Hakeim Century and Ruffel-Kinder Task Force)

== Films ==
- Les Libérations de l’Alsace, 1944-1945, film by Monique Seemann and Bertrand Gautier, 52 min., Éd. Seppia, Strasbourg.
- La Liberté en retour: histoire de la brigade Alsace-Lorraine, film by Monique Seemann and Arnaud Gobin, 52 min., Carmin Films, Strasbourg, 2000.

== Bibliography ==
- Mercadet, Léon: La Brigade Alsace-Lorraine. Paris: Bernard Grasset, 1984. ISBN 2-246-30811-9.
