= Hôtel de Ville, Bruges, Gironde =

Town hall in Bruges, Gironde, France

Hôtel de Ville
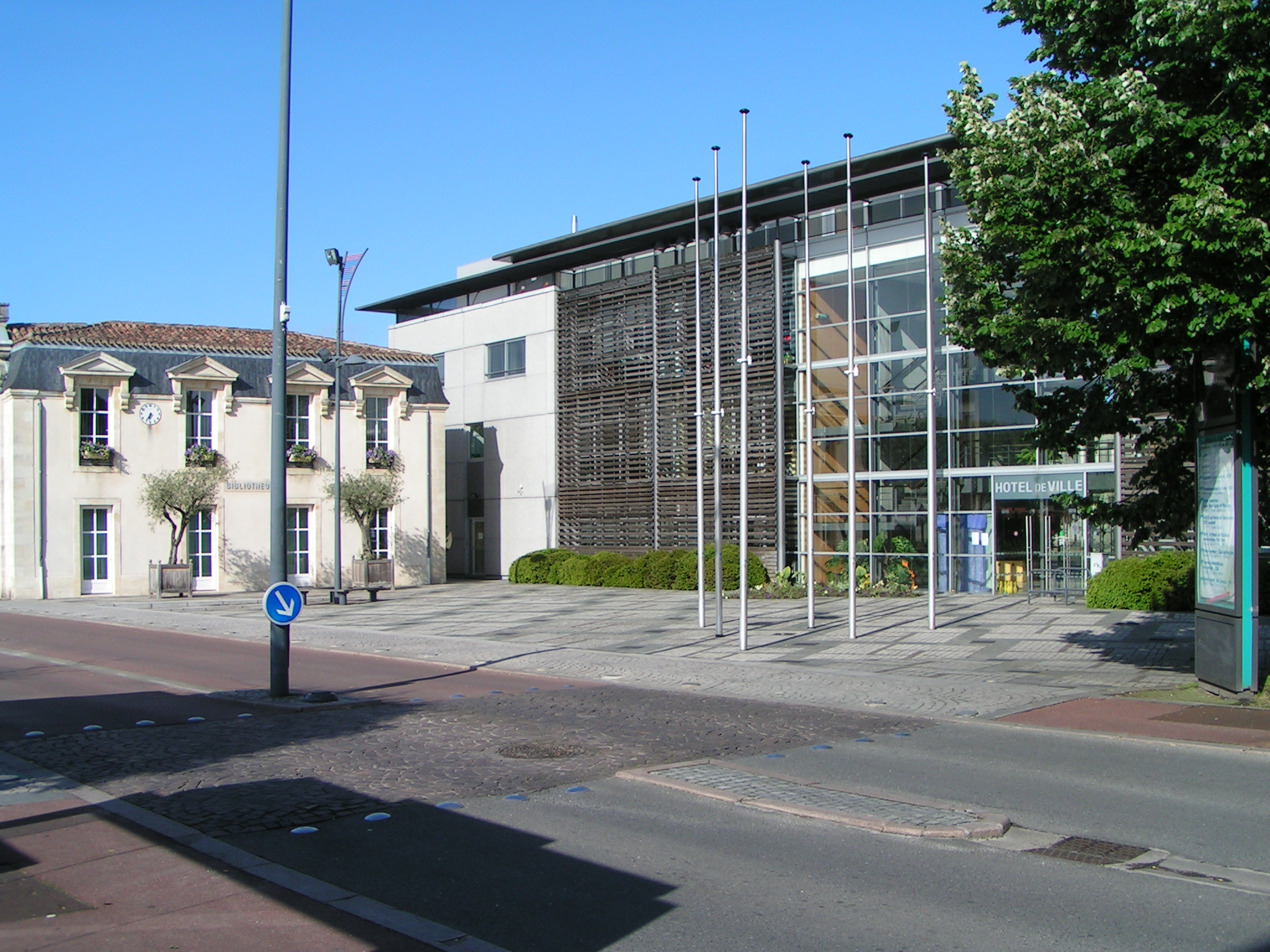
- The main frontage of the Hôtel de Ville in May 2007 (with the old town hall on the left)

General information
- Type: City hall
- Architectural style: Modern style
- Location: Bruges, France
- Coordinates: 44.8815°N 0.6127°W
- Completed: 1992

Design and construction
- Architects: Patrick Baggio and Anne Piechaud

The Hôtel de Ville (French pronunciation: [otɛl də vil], City Hall) is a municipal building in Bruges, Gironde, in southwestern France, standing on Avenue Charles-de-Gaulle.

== History ==
=== The old town hall ===
Following the French Revolution, the town council initially met in the house of the mayor at the time. This arrangement continued until the late 19th century, when the council decided to acquire a suitable building for municipal use. The building they selected, on the east side of what is now Avenue Charles-de-Gaulle, dated back at least to the mid-19th century. The land on which it had been built had formed formed part of the estate of the Château des Borges, which had been owned by a wine merchant, Théodore Bellemer, in the mid-19th century.

The property on Avenue Charles-de-Gaulle had initially served as a facility for teaching nuns, and had then become a school, before being converted for municipal use. It had been designed in the neoclassical style and built in ashlar stone. The original design involved a symmetrical main frontage of three bays facing southwest onto Place de la Mairie. There were three doorways on the ground floor and three casement windows with triangular pediments on the first floor. The left-hand end of the building, facing northwest, featured a French door with a balustraded balcony on the first floor and a stepped gable above. After the building was no longer required for municipal use it was converted for use as a library and, once the library service relocated to Château Treulon in October 2022, the building was converted into a police station at a cost of €785,000 in spring 2026.

A war memorial in the form of a statue of a soldier intended to commemorate the lives of local service personnel who died in the First World War was installed in Place de la Mairie on 10 November 1922.

=== The new town hall ===
In the late 1980s, following significant population growth, the council led by the mayor, Raymond Manaud, decided to commission a modern town hall. The site they selected, on the southeastern side of Place de la Mairie, was adjacent to the old town hall. The new building was designed by Patrick Baggio and Anne Piechaud in the modern style, built in concrete and glass and was completed in 1992.

The design of the three-storey building involved an asymmetrical main frontage of nine bays facing onto Place de la Mairie. The first two bays, which were largely concealed by the old town hall, were blind. The next two bays featured a series of horizontal black slats, the next two bays after that were faced in plate glass and contained the entrance at ground floor level, while the last three bays also featured a series of horizontal black slats. Internally the principal room was the Salle du Conseil (council chamber).
