= Canton of Le Bouscat =

Coordinates: 44.87°N 0.60°W

- Canton
- Location of the canton of Le Bouscat in the Gironde department.
- Country: France
- Region: Nouvelle-Aquitaine
- Department: Gironde
- No. of communes: {{{nbcomm}}}
- Established: 1973

Government
  - Representatives (2021–2028): Fabienne Dumas; Dominique Vincent
- Area: 19.50 km^{2} (7.53 sq mi)
- Population (2023): 45,101
  - Density: 2,313/km^{2} (5,990/sq mi)
- INSEE code: 33 07

The canton of Le Bouscat is an administrative division of the Gironde department, southwestern France. Its borders were not modified at the French canton reorganisation which came into effect in March 2015. Its seat is in Le Bouscat.

It consists of the following communes:

1. Le Bouscat
2. Bruges
