= Eygalayes =

- Commune
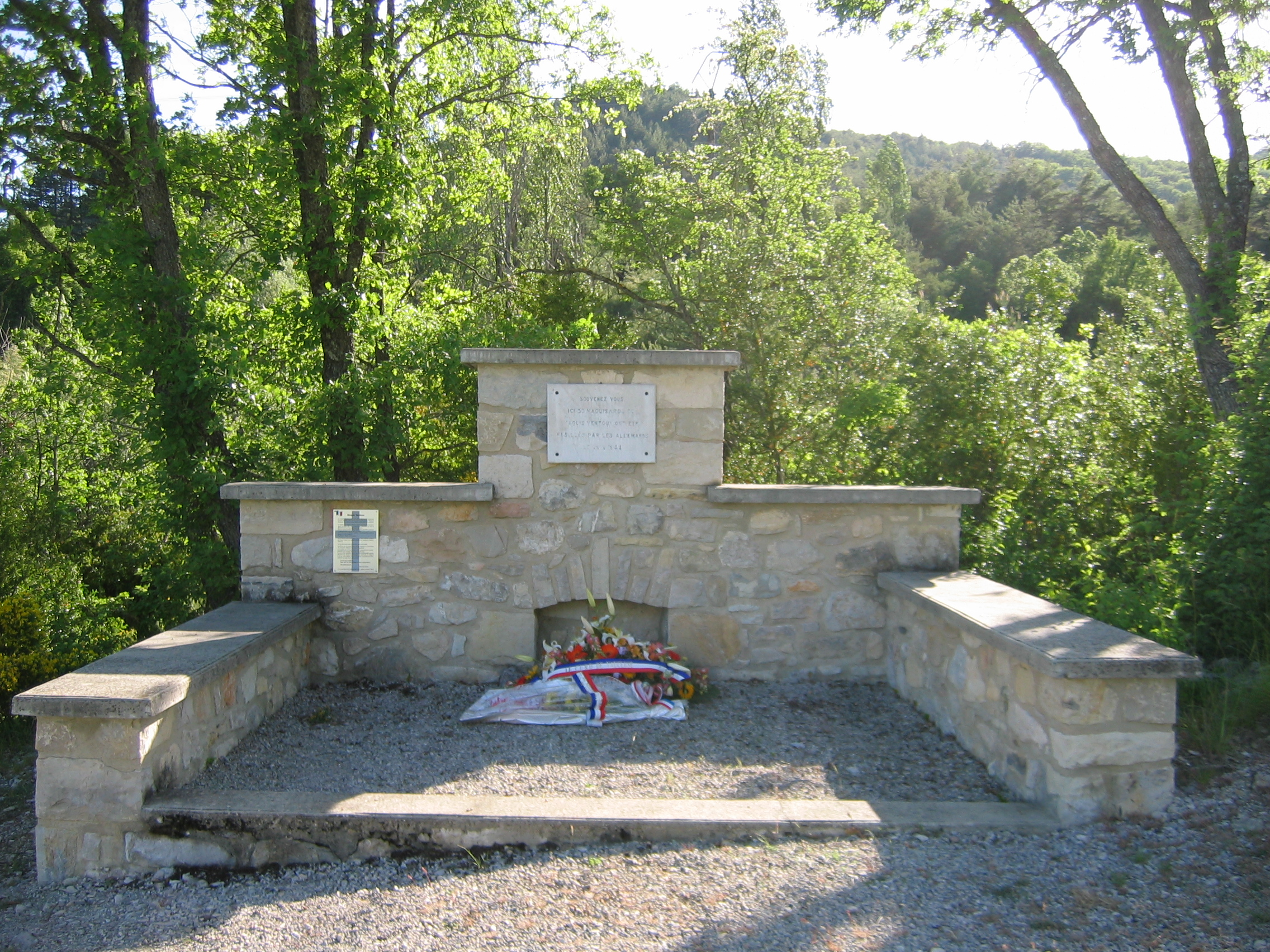
- Monument to Resistance fighters
- Location of Eygalayes
- Location within France Location within Auvergne-Rhône-Alpes
- Coordinates: 44°14′24″N 5°36′30″E
- Country: France
- Region: Auvergne-Rhône-Alpes
- Department: Drôme
- Arrondissement: Nyons
- Canton: Nyons et Baronnies

Government
  - Mayor (2022–2026): Eric Lyobard
- Area^{1}: 17.97 km^{2} (6.94 sq mi)
- Highest elevation: 1,484 m (4,869 ft)
- Lowest elevation: 722 m (2,369 ft)
- Population (2023): 89
  - Density: 5.0/km^{2} (13/sq mi)
- Time zone: UTC+01:00 (CET)
  - Summer (DST): UTC+02:00 (CEST)
- INSEE/Postal code: 26126 /26560
- ^{1} French Land Register data, which excludes lakes, ponds, glaciers > 1 km^{2} (0.386 sq mi or 247 acres) and river estuaries.

Eygalayes (French pronunciation: [ɛɡalaj]; Occitan: Aigalaia) is a commune in the Drôme department in the Auvergne-Rhône-Alpes region in southeastern France.

== Population ==
Historical population
Year	Pop.	±% p.a.
1968	106	—
1975	89	−2.47%
1982	80	−1.51%
1990	76	−0.64%
1999	76	+0.00%
2007	70	−1.02%
2012	64	−1.78%
2017	86	+6.09%
2023	89	+0.57%
Source: INSEE

== See also ==
- Communes of the Drôme department
