= Le Bouscat =

- Commune
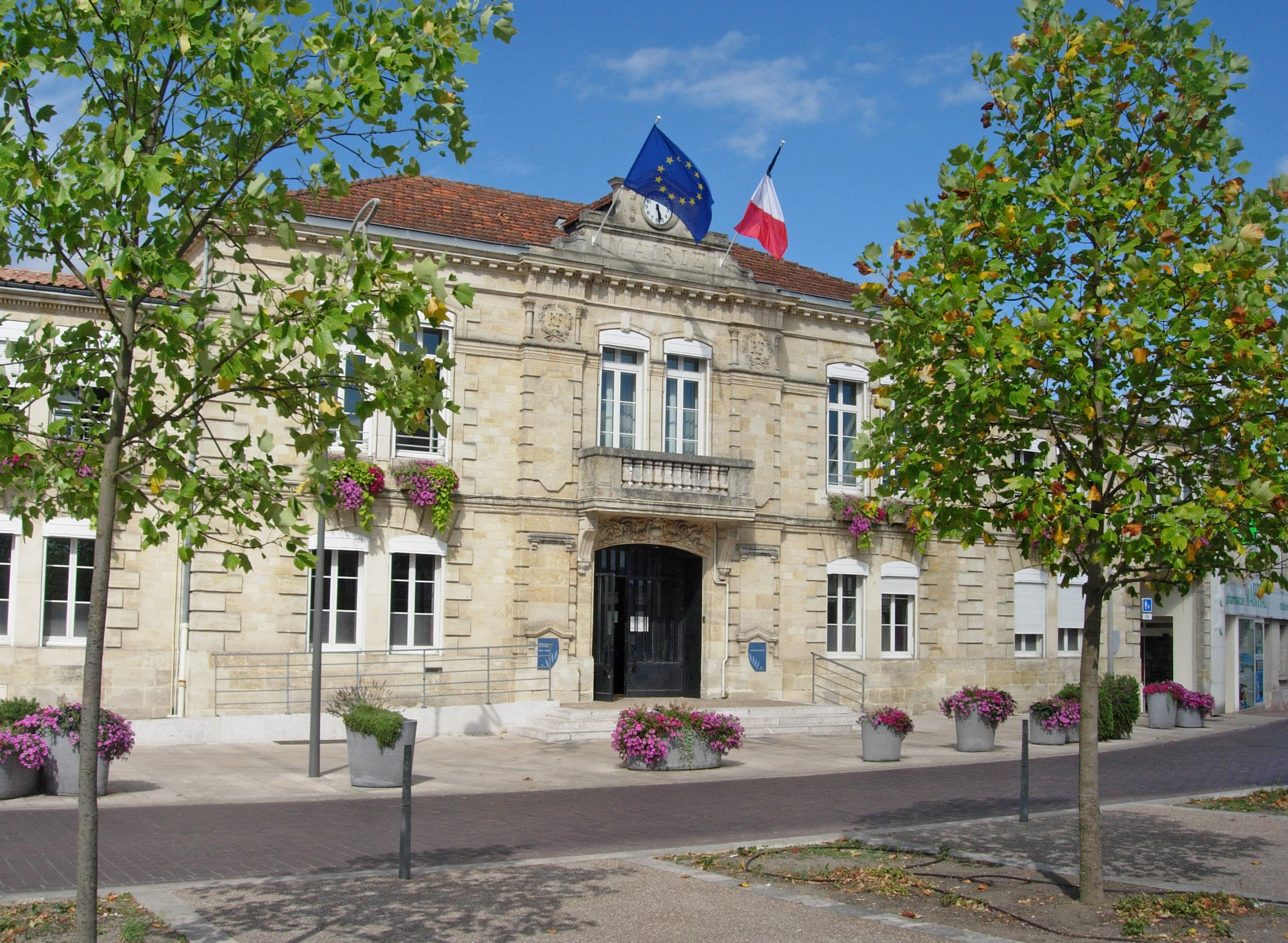
- The Hôtel de Ville

- Coat of arms
- Location of Le Bouscat
- Location within France Location within Nouvelle-Aquitaine
- Coordinates: 44°51′54″N 0°35′59″W
- Country: France
- Region: Nouvelle-Aquitaine
- Department: Gironde
- Arrondissement: Bordeaux
- Canton: Le Bouscat
- Intercommunality: Bordeaux Métropole

Government
  - Mayor (2020–2026): Patrick Bobet
- Area^{1}: 5.28 km^{2} (2.04 sq mi)
- Elevation: 10 m (33 ft)
- Highest elevation: 27 m (89 ft)
- Lowest elevation: 2 m (6.6 ft)
- Population (2023): 25,081
  - Density: 4,750/km^{2} (12,300/sq mi)
- Time zone: UTC+01:00 (CET)
  - Summer (DST): UTC+02:00 (CEST)
- INSEE/Postal code: 33069 /33110
- ^{1} French Land Register data, which excludes lakes, ponds, glaciers > 1 km^{2} (0.386 sq mi or 247 acres) and river estuaries.

Le Bouscat (Gascon: Lo Boscat) is a commune in the Gironde department in Nouvelle-Aquitaine in southwestern France. It is a suburb of the city of Bordeaux and is adjacent to it on the north side.

Its sister city is Glen Ellyn, Illinois, USA.

== History ==
The Hôtel de Ville was completed in 1878.

== Population ==
Historical population

Year	Pop.	±% p.a.
1793	1,650	—
1800	1,404	−2.28%
1806	1,577	+1.96%
1821	1,629	+0.22%
1831	1,729	+0.60%
1836	1,758	+0.33%
1841	1,988	+2.49%
1846	2,314	+3.08%
1851	2,338	+0.21%
1856	2,803	+3.69%
1861	3,565	+4.93%
1866	2,907	−4.00%
1872	3,455	+2.92%
1876	4,182	+4.89%
1881	4,534	+1.63%
1886	6,463	+7.35%
1891	8,223	+4.93%
1896	9,315	+2.53%
1901	10,446	+2.32%

Year	Pop.	±% p.a.
1906	11,092	+1.21%
1911	11,347	+0.46%
1921	13,085	+1.44%
1926	14,572	+2.18%
1931	16,128	+2.05%
1936	17,653	+1.82%
1946	18,901	+0.69%
1954	19,558	+0.43%
1962	21,404	+1.13%
1968	22,550	+0.87%
1975	21,126	−0.93%
1982	20,906	−0.15%
1990	21,538	+0.37%
1999	22,455	+0.46%
2007	23,334	+0.48%
2012	23,376	+0.04%
2017	23,824	+0.38%
2023	25,081	+0.86%

Source: EHESS and INSEE (1968-2023)

== See also ==
- Communes of the Gironde department
