= Bruges, Gironde =

Bruges
- Commune
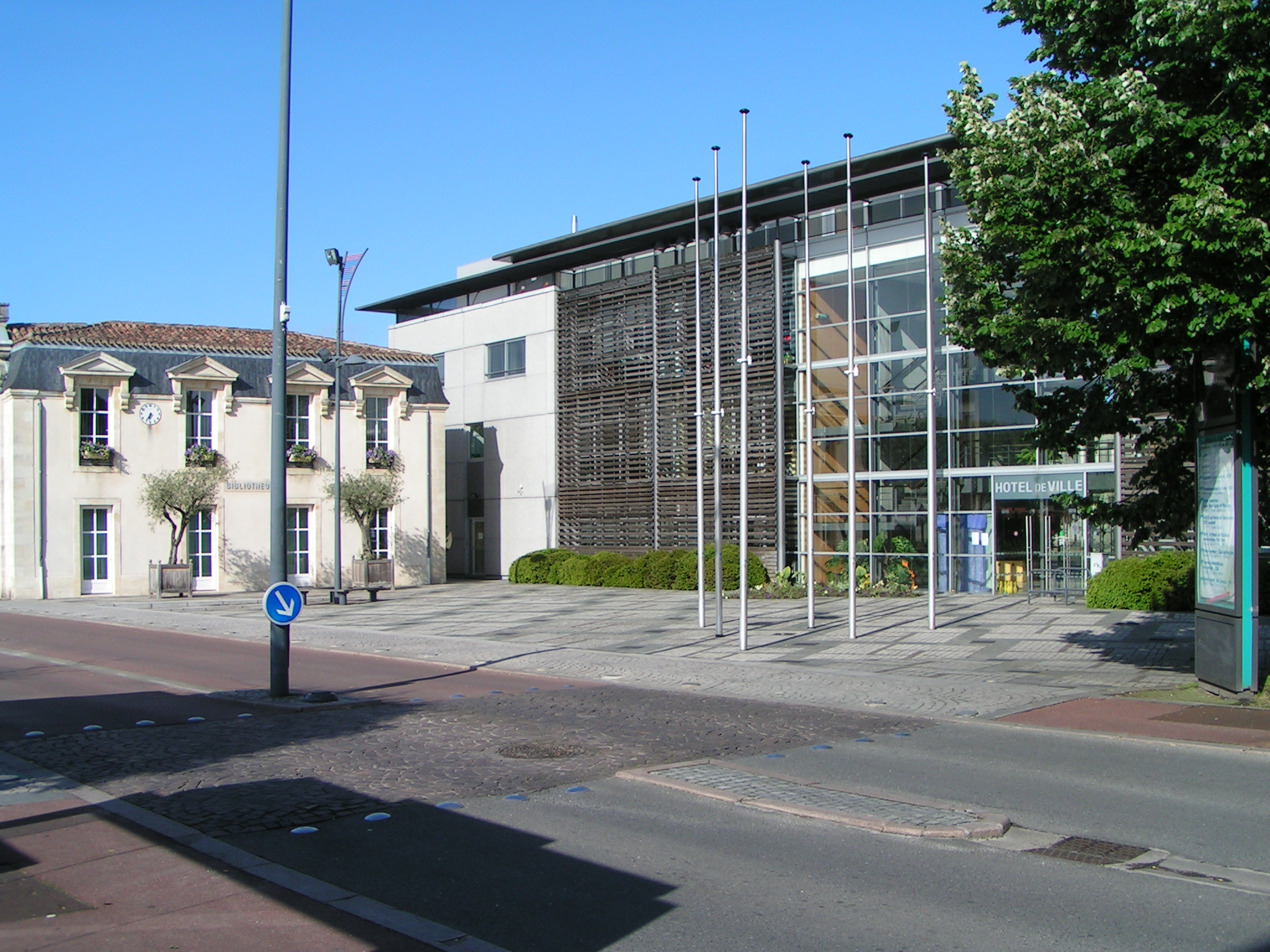
- The Hôtel de Ville

- Coat of arms
- Location of Bruges
- Location within France Location within Nouvelle-Aquitaine
- Coordinates: 44°53′01″N 0°36′41″W
- Country: France
- Region: Nouvelle-Aquitaine
- Department: Gironde
- Arrondissement: Bordeaux
- Canton: Le Bouscat
- Intercommunality: Bordeaux Métropole

Government
  - Mayor (2020–2026): Brigitte Terraza
- Area^{1}: 14.22 km^{2} (5.49 sq mi)
- Elevation: 10 m (33 ft)
- Highest elevation: 31 m (102 ft)
- Lowest elevation: 1 m (3.3 ft)
- Population (2023): 20,020
  - Density: 1,408/km^{2} (3,646/sq mi)
- Time zone: UTC+01:00 (CET)
  - Summer (DST): UTC+02:00 (CEST)
- INSEE/Postal code: 33075 /33520
- ^{1} French Land Register data, which excludes lakes, ponds, glaciers > 1 km^{2} (0.386 sq mi or 247 acres) and river estuaries.

Bruges (French pronunciation: [bʁyʒ]; Occitan: Bruge) is a commune in the French department of Gironde, region of Nouvelle-Aquitaine (formerly Aquitaine), southwestern France. It is located in the north of Bordeaux.

== Toponymy ==
The homography with Bruges (Belgium) is purely coincidental. The place-name comes from Gasconic bruche, with a plural -s meaning "bushes", "scrubs".

== History ==
The Hôtel de Ville was completed in 1992.

== Population ==
Historical population
Year	Pop.	±% p.a.
1968	6,612	—
1975	7,610	+2.03%
1982	7,686	+0.14%
1990	8,753	+1.64%
1999	10,610	+2.16%
2007	13,605	+3.16%
2012	16,269	+3.64%
2017	17,924	+1.96%
2023	20,020	+1.86%
Source: INSEE

== People ==
- Anthony Moura-Komenan footballer
- Mathieu Valbuena footballer

== See also ==
- Communes of the Gironde department
