= Izon-la-Bruisse =

- Commune
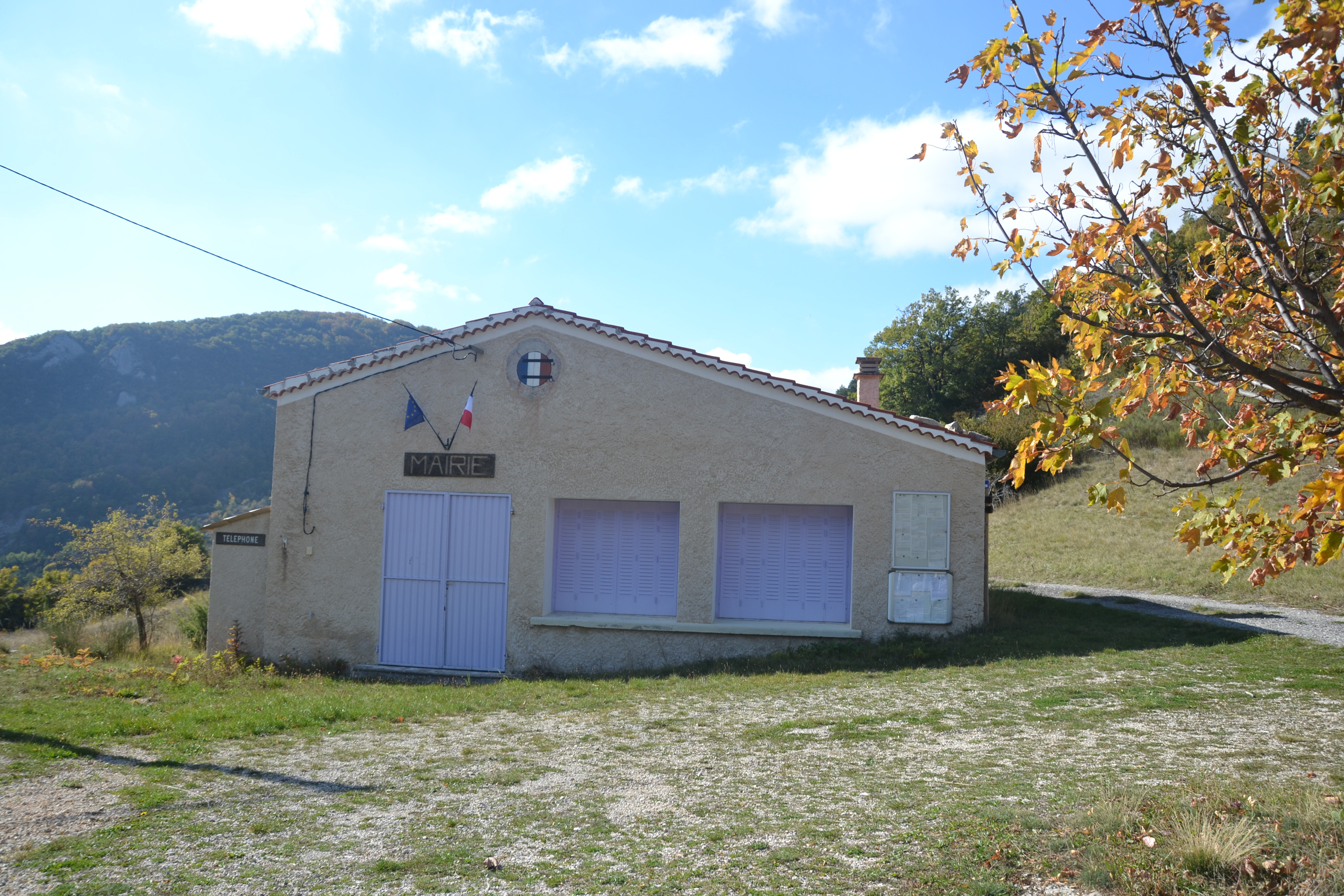
- Town hall
- Location of Izon-la-Bruisse
- Location within France Location within Auvergne-Rhône-Alpes
- Coordinates: 44°15′22″N 5°35′39″E
- Country: France
- Region: Auvergne-Rhône-Alpes
- Department: Drôme
- Arrondissement: Nyons
- Canton: Nyons et Baronnies
- Intercommunality: Baronnies en Drôme Provençale

Government
  - Mayor (2020–2026): André Mathieu
- Area^{1}: 14.65 km^{2} (5.66 sq mi)
- Elevation: 1,110 m (3,640 ft)
- Highest elevation: 1,532 m (5,026 ft)
- Lowest elevation: 773 m (2,536 ft)
- Population (2023): 12
  - Density: 0.82/km^{2} (2.1/sq mi)
- Time zone: UTC+01:00 (CET)
  - Summer (DST): UTC+02:00 (CEST)
- INSEE/Postal code: 26150 /26560
- ^{1} French Land Register data, which excludes lakes, ponds, glaciers > 1 km^{2} (0.386 sq mi or 247 acres) and river estuaries.

Izon-la-Bruisse (French pronunciation: [izɔ̃ la bʁɥis]; Occitan: Ison de la Broeissa) is a commune in the Drôme department in southeastern France.

== Population ==
Historical population
Year	Pop.	±% p.a.
1968	5	—
1975	5	+0.00%
1982	8	+6.94%
1990	6	−3.53%
1999	14	+9.87%
2007	12	−1.91%
2012	8	−7.79%
2017	10	+4.56%
2023	12	+3.09%
Source: INSEE

== See also ==
- Communes of the Drôme department
