= French Forces of the Interior =

World War II Resistance fighters

French Forces of the Interior Forces françaises de l'intérieur
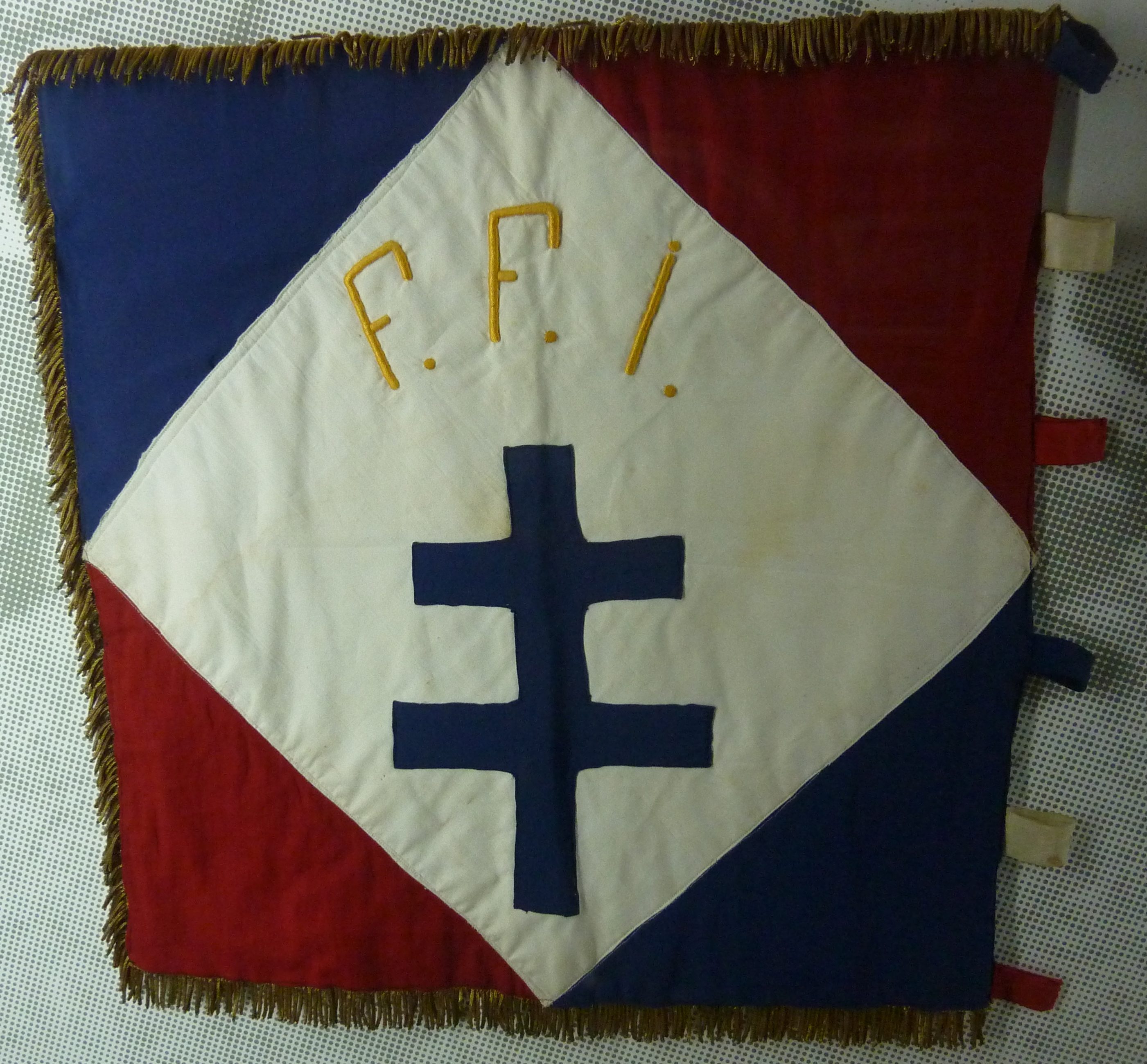
- The Cross of Lorraine on the flag of the 2nd company, 1st battalion, FFI Finistere. It was founded by a group of French Scouts who joined the French Resistance in June 1940. The group carried out intelligence missions and the repatriations of allied airmen. In February 1944 it became part of the FFI and participated in the liberation of Quimper on August 8, 1944.
- Active: 1944–1945
- Country: France
- Allegiance: (France) French Army
- Type: Paramilitary; Irregular military
- Size: 400,000 by October 1944
- Garrison/HQ: Occupied France and Liberated France
- Equipment: French, British, American
- Engagements: World War II

Commanders
- Notable commanders: Marie-Pierre Kœnig

The French Forces of the Interior (FFI; French: Forces françaises de l'Intérieur) were French resistance fighters in the later stages of World War II. Charles de Gaulle used it as a formal name for the resistance fighters. The change in designation of these groups to FFI occurred as France's status changed from that of an occupied nation to one of a nation being liberated by the Allied armies. As regions of France were liberated, the FFI were more formally organized into light infantry units and served as a valuable manpower addition to regular Free French forces. In this role, the FFI units manned less active areas of the front lines, allowing regular French army units to practice economy of force measures and mass their troops in decisive areas of the front. Finally, from October 1944 and with the greater part of France liberated, the FFI units were amalgamated into the French regular forces continuing the fight on the Western Front, thus ending the era of the French irregulars in World War II.

== Liberation ==
After the invasion of Normandy in June 1944, at the request of the French Committee of National Liberation, SHAEF placed about 200,000 resistance fighters under command of General Marie Pierre Kœnig, who attempted to unify resistance efforts against the Germans. General Eisenhower confirmed Koenig's command of the FFI on 23 June 1944.

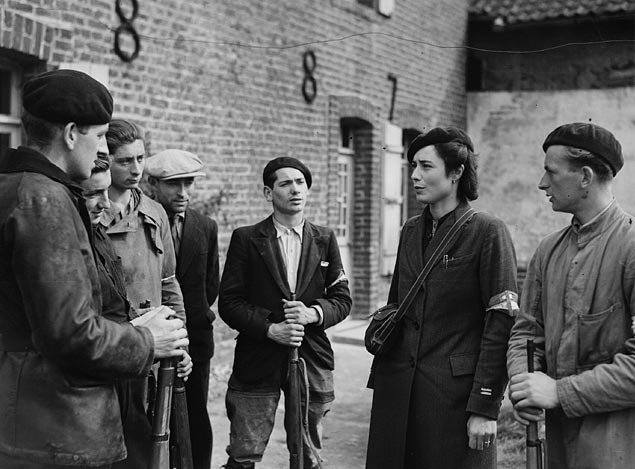
Members of the French resistance in Boulogne, September 1944.

The FFI were mostly composed of resistance fighters who used their own weapons, although many FFI units included former French soldiers. They used civilian clothing and wore an armband with the letters "F.F.I."

According to General Patton, the rapid advance of his army through France would have been impossible without the fighting aid of the FFI. General Patch estimated that from the time of the Mediterranean landings to the arrival of U.S. troops at Dijon, the help given to the operations by the FFI was equivalent to four full divisions.

FFI units seized bridges, began the liberation of villages and towns as Allied units neared, and collected intelligence on German units in the areas entered by the Allied forces, easing the Allied advance through France in August 1944. According to a volume of the U.S. official history of the war,

In Brittany, southern France, and the area of the Loire and Paris, French Resistance forces greatly aided the pursuit to the Seine in August. Specifically, they supported the Third Army in Brittany and the Seventh U.S. and First French Armies in the southern beachhead and the Rhône valley. In the advance to the Seine, the French Forces of the Interior helped protect the southern flank of the Third Army by interfering with enemy railroad and highway movements and enemy telecommunications, by developing open resistance on as wide a scale as possible, by providing tactical intelligence, by preserving installations of value to the Allied forces, and by mopping up bypassed enemy positions.

== Political tension ==
On 20 June 1944 the French high command decreed that the mobilization requirements dating from the start of the war remained in effect, that the FFI units would become part of the French Army, and that the FFI was subject to French military law. After the liberation of Paris in August 1944, Charles de Gaulle almost immediately confronted a challenge to his authority from an FFI flush with triumph as towns and cities were liberated in the wake of the German retreat from France. In late August 1944 incidents of FFI misbehavior occurred in the region of Paris, highlighting the risks of having an armed and organized citizenry that suddenly found itself without a mission. De Gaulle believed France required a single decisive leader to restore effective government. The FFI believed they should have a share in national power because of their contribution to the Allied war-effort. Subsequently, de Gaulle declared the FFI would be either disbanded or integrated into the French Army, and a series of tense meetings between de Gaulle and FFI leaders in major cities ensued. Despite FFI disenchantment with de Gaulle's methods, in large part they accepted his decision that FFI members would either be amalgamated into the French regular army or return to civilian life.

== Amalgamation ==
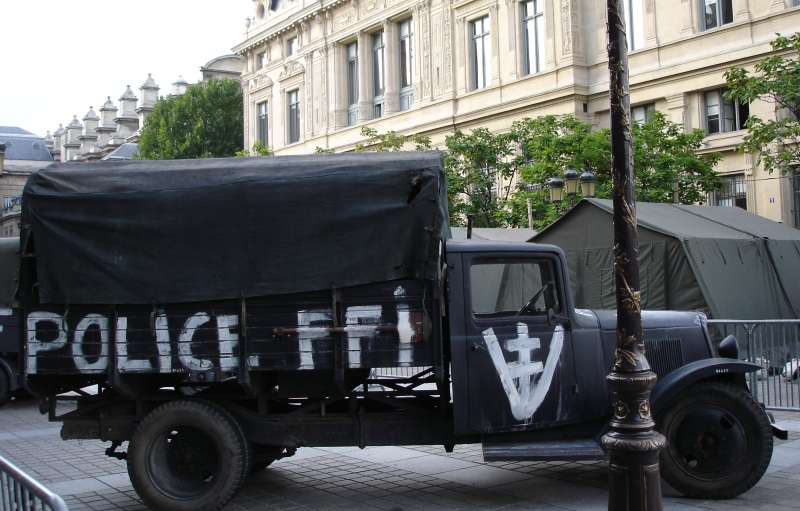
FFI and Vercors Republic marked captured truck during the battle for Paris (1944), on exhibition during the 60th anniversary celebrations of the liberation.

Subsequent to the liberation of areas where FFI units operated, they often formed battalions and brigades named for their commanders or region of origin (Battalion Oziol, etc.) These FFI units were predominantly of the light infantry class, although some formed light reconnaissance units like the 12th Regiment of Dragoons. Some of these units were used to besiege German troops in still-occupied French ports or to secure France's alpine frontier with Italy, others were used to secure Allied lines of communications in France, and still others were assigned as army reserve units for the use of General de Lattre de Tassigny's French First Army. From October 1944 until March 1945, the FFI units were amalgamated into the French Army in order to regularize the units. Units such as the 49th Infantry Regiment (formerly the FFI Corps Franc Pommiés) and the 3rd Demi-Brigade of Chasseurs (formerly the FFI Alsace-Lorraine Brigade) were constituted in this manner using FFI manpower. Amalgamation was successful in varying degree; the training, tactics and attitudes of the former French Resistance fighters often differed from those of the regular soldiers with whom they served. General De Lattre's comments on this situation are enlightening:

[Traditional military values] were not and could not be the characteristics of the F.F.I. units. Condemned to be born and live in secret, placed outside the law by the enemy and by the enemy's accomplices, they had above all developed the revolutionary military virtues, those of partisans. By force of circumstances the personalities of the leaders had played a determining role and had stamped each maquis with a different brand. . . . To the regiments we had landed the extreme variety of the F.F.I. organizations, their at least peculiar discipline, the differing quality of their groups, the poverty of their equipment, the crying inadequacy of their armament and supplies, the heterogeneity of their officering, the facility with which their superior ranks had been assigned, and in certain cases the ostensibly political nature of their aims, ran counter to the classical military outlook of many officers, some of whom, in reaction, exaggerated their regulation strictness. . . .

The part [the FFI] had taken in the fight for liberation not only encouraged them rightly in the wish to retain their individuality; their successes, valued often from a local angle, established in their view the excellence of the military system which circumstances had led them to create and which they intended to substitute for the traditional system, which they considered out-of-date.

A total of 68 infantry regiments and half-brigades, two special forces battalions, 20 light infantry or reconnaissance battalions, one tank battalion, sixteen artillery regiments, two anti-aircraft artillery regiments, five engineer regiments, and three construction regiments were ultimately formed from FFI manpower by the close of 1945.

== Weapons and equipment ==
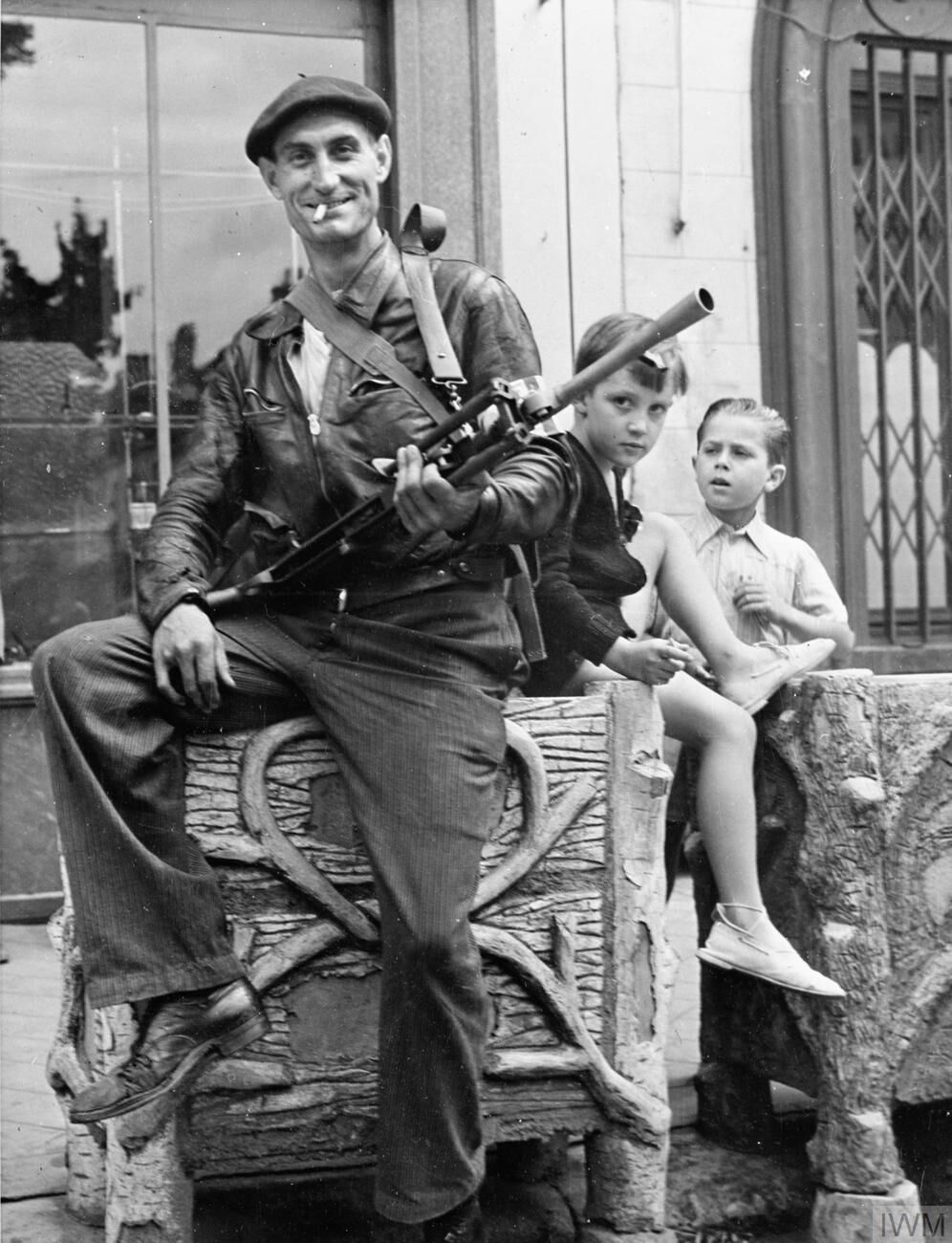
Member of the FFI in Châteaudun with a Bren gun.

The weapons and equipment of the FFI were highly varied. For example, the Royal Air Force (working alongside the Special Operations Executive) parachute-dropped British-made weapons such as Sten guns, revolvers, grenades and explosives to the FFI in order to harass German forces. This enabled the FFI to capture German weaponry which was also used.

Because they were not units that the United States had formally agreed to logistically support, they were not eligible to receive the standard U.S. equipment that was provided to French regular army units. Thus, the FFI units often clothed themselves in nonstandard uniforms or uniforms of 1940 vintage. The same condition existed with weapons, with the use of captured German infantry weapons a common practice. Because of the mix of American, British, French, German, and other weapons, the supply of ammunition and spare parts was complicated and often difficult to accomplish. By no means unique in the diversity of its armament, the 34th Infantry Regiment (formed on 1 January 1945) possessed the following weapons in August 1945: 1,760 (German) Mauser rifles, 470 (British) Sten sub-machine guns, 108 German sub-machine guns, 27 (French) Hotchkiss machine guns, 33 50-mm mortars and 12 81-mm mortars, two 20-mm cannon, and three 25-mm cannon. The soldiers' uniforms were described as second-hand and of diverse origins.

Some heavy armored fighting vehicles were obtained, notably British Cromwell tanks (150 provided by the United Kingdom) and captured German tanks (44, of which 12 were Panthers). The 12th Regiment of Dragoons received 12 Cavalier tanks among other British equipment in April 1945. In other cases, FFI units used vehicles no longer favored by Allied forces, such as the U.S. M6 Fargo, a light truck with a portee 37 mm antitank gun. Finally, civilian vehicles and practically anything else in running condition were pressed into service and used until they could no longer be maintained.

== French strategic asset ==
As regions of France were liberated, the FFI provided a ready pool of semi-trained manpower with which France could rebuild the French Army. Estimated to have a strength of 100,000 in June 1944, the strength of the FFI grew rapidly, doubling by July 1944, and reaching 400,000 by October 1944.

According to the Defence Historical Service (SHD), 252,000 individuals have been approved as FFI.

Although the amalgamation of the FFI was in some cases fraught with political difficulty, it was ultimately successful and allowed France to re-establish a reasonably large army of 1.3 million men by VE Day.

== See also ==
- Binnenlandse Strijdkrachten (Netherlands)
- French Liberation Army
- Maquis Ventoux
