= Jean Giono bibliography =

Jean Giono (30 March 1895 – 8 October 1970) was a French author who wrote works of fiction mostly set in Manosque in the Provence region of France.

== Novels, novellas, chronicles ==
- Hill of Destiny (Fr. Colline) – Grasset, 1929; English translation Brentano's, 1930
- Lovers are Never Losers (Fr. Un de Baumugnes) – Grasset – 1929
- Second Harvest (Fr. Regain) – Grasset – 1930
- Naissance de l'Odyssée – Editions Kra – 1930
- To The Slaughterhouse (Fr. Le Grand Troupeau) – Gallimard – 1931
- Blue Boy (Fr. Jean le Bleu) – Grasset – 1932
- Solitude of Compassion (Fr. Solitude de la pitié) – Gallimard 1932
- The Song of the World (Fr. Le Chant du monde – Gallimard – 1934
- Joy of Man's Desiring (Fr. Que ma joie demeure) – Grasset – 1936
- Batailles dans la montagne – Gallimard – 1937
- The Serpent of Stars (Fr. Le serpent d'étoiles) – Grasset – 1939
- Pour saluer Melville – Gallimard – 1941
- L'eau vive – Gallimard – 1943 (Rondeur des Jours et l'Oiseau bagué -1973)
- A King Alone (Fr. Un roi sans divertissement) – Gallimard – 1947
- Noé – Editions la Table ronde – 1947
- Fragments d'un paradis – Déchalotte – 1948
- Mort d'un personnage – Grasset – 1949
- Les Âmes fortes – Gallimard – 1949
- The Open Road (Fr. Les Grands chemins) – Gallimard – 1951
- The Horseman on the Roof (Fr. Le Hussard sur le toit) – Gallimard – 1951
- The Malediction, (Fr. Le Moulin de Pologne) – 1952
- The Man Who Planted Trees (Fr. L'homme qui plantait des arbres) – Reader's Digest – 1953
- The Straw Man (Fr. Le Bonheur fou) – Éditions Gallimard – 1957
- Angelo (Fr. Angelo) – Gallimard – 1958
- Hortense ou l'Eau vive (avec Jean Allioux) Editions France-Empire – 1958
- Two Riders of the Storm (Fr. Deux cavaliers de l'orage) – Gallimard – 1965
- Le Déserteur – René Creux Editeur – 1966 (le Déserteur et autres récits – Gallimard – 1973)
- Ennemonde: A Novel (Fr. Ennemonde et Autres Caractères) – Gallimard – 1968
- L'Iris de Suse – Gallimard – 1970
- Les Récits de la demi-brigade – Gallimard – 1972
- Faust au village – Gallimard – 1977
- Le Bestiaire – Ramsay – 1991
- "Gavino" – Gallimard – 2000

== Unfinished novels ==
- Angélique – Gallimard – 1980
- Cœur, Passions, Caractères – Gallimard – 1982
- Dragoon suivi d'Olympe – Gallimard – 1982

== Essays and journalism ==
- Présentation de Pan – Éditions Grasset – 1930
- Manosque-des-plateaux – Emile-Paul Frères – 1931
- Le Serpent d'Etoiles – Grasset – 1933
- Les Vraies Richesses – Grasset – 1936
- Refus d'obéissance – Gallimard 1937
- Le Poids du ciel – Gallimard – 1938
- Lettre aux paysans sur la pauvreté et la paix – Grasset – 1938
- Précisions – Grasset – 1939
- Recherche de la pureté – Gallimard – 1939
- Triomphe de la vie – Ides et Calendes – 1941
- Trip to Italy ( Fr. Voyage en Italie) – Gallimard – 1953
- Notes sur l'affaire Dominici – Gallimard – 1955
- The Battle of Pavia (Fr. Le Désastre de Pavie) – Gallimard – 1963
- Les Terrasses de l'Ile d'Elbe – Gallimard – 1976
- Les Trois Arbres de Palzem – Gallimard – 1984
- De Homère à Machiavel – Gallimard – 1986
- Images d'un jour de pluie et autres récits de jeunesse – Editions Philippe Auzou – 1987
- La Chasse au Bonheur – Gallimard – 1988
- Provence – Gallimard – 1993
- Les Héraclides – Quatuor – 1995
- De Montluc à la "Série Noire" – Gallimard – 1998

== Poetry ==
- Accompagnés de la flûte – les Cahiers de l'Artisan – 1923
- La Chute des Anges, Fragment d'un Déluge, Le Cœur-Cerf – Rico – 1969

== Theater ==
- Le bout de la Route – Lanceur de Graines – La Femme du boulanger – Gallimard – 1943
- Le Voyage en calèche – Éditions du Rocher – 1947. Written during the Second World War, this play was banned under the German occupation of France.
- Domitien, suivi de Joseph à Dothan – Gallimard – 1959
- Le Cheval fou – Gallimard – 1974

== Letters ==
- Avec Jean Paulhan – Gallimard – 2000
- Avec André Gide – Université de Lyon – 1983
- Avec Jean Guéhenno – Seghers – 1975
- Avec Lucien Jacques – Gallimard – 1981 et 1983 (2 volumes)

== Journals ==
- Journal de l'Occupation – Gallimard, 1995 (translated into English by Jody Gladding, Archipelago, 2020)

== Interviews ==
- Avec Jean Carrière – La Manufacture – 1985
- Avec Jean et Taos Amrouche – Gallimard – 1990

== Translations ==
- Moby Dick (translation of the Herman Melville novel; with Lucien Jacques and Joan Smith) – Les Cahiers du Contadour – 1939
- L'expédition d'Humphry Clinker (translation of the Tobias G. Smollett novel; with Catherine d'Ivernois) – Gallimard – 1955

== Scenario ==
- Crésus – Rico – 1961
