= Pan trilogy =

1929–1930 French novels by Jean Giono

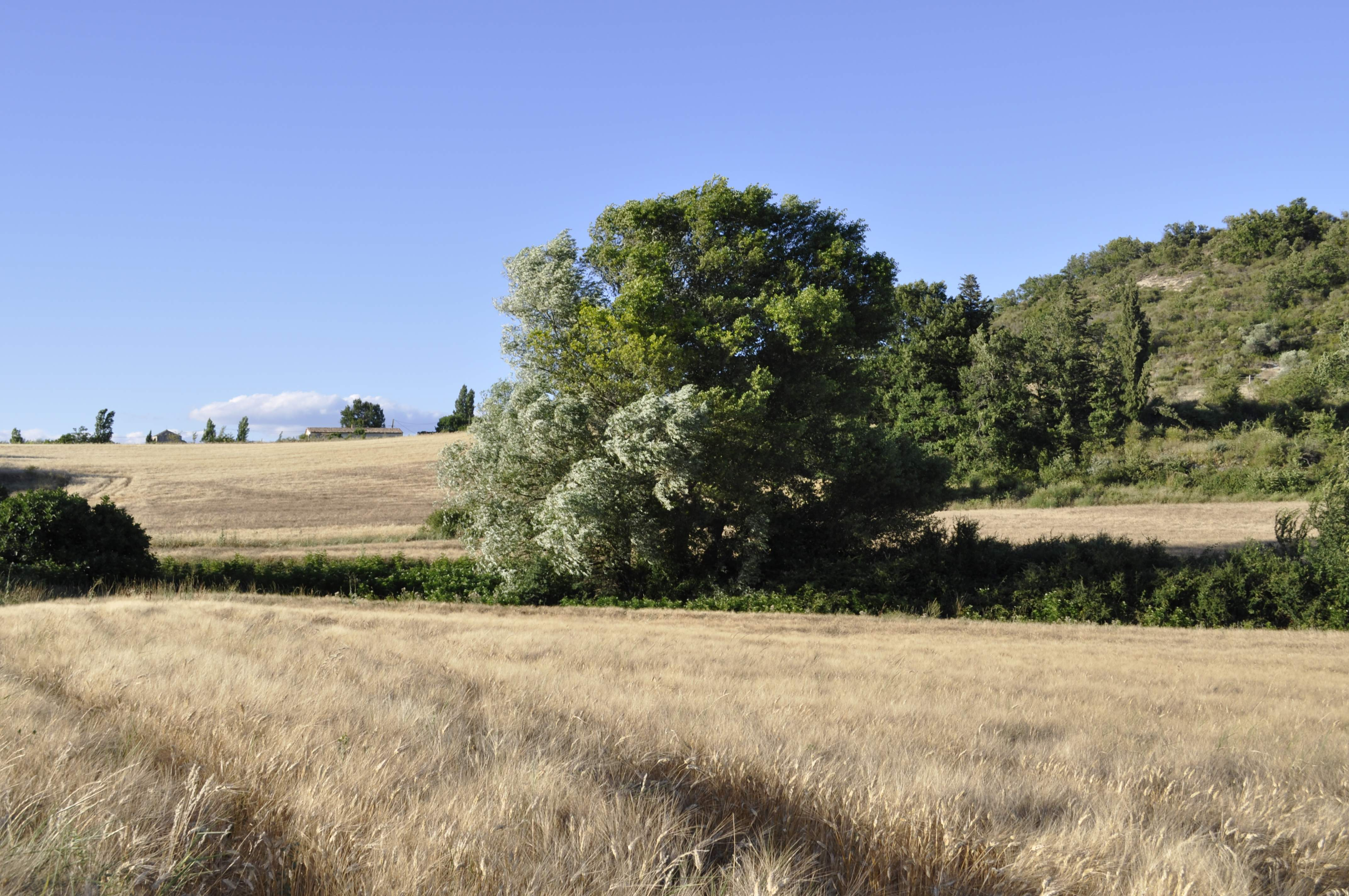
Landscape near Giono's native Manosque, Provence

The Pan trilogy (French: trilogie de Pan) consists of three novels by the French writer Jean Giono, published in 1929–1930. The stand-alone stories are set in Provence and revolve the struggles of the peasant population. Two of the novels were made into films in the 1930s by Marcel Pagnol.

== Background ==
The god Pan first occurred in Jean Giono's works in the 1924 poetry collection Accompagné de la flûte. He is then mentioned in Giono's private correspondence, appears in his first written novel Naissance de l'Odyssée, and was the subject of an unpublished magazine article in the 1920s. Further, Giono referred to Walt Whitman, an author he admired, as the "American Pan".

Giono wrote the Pan trilogy while working as a bank clerk in his native Manosque, northern Provence. The stories were inspired by the author's reading of ancient Greek and Roman literature.

== Stories ==
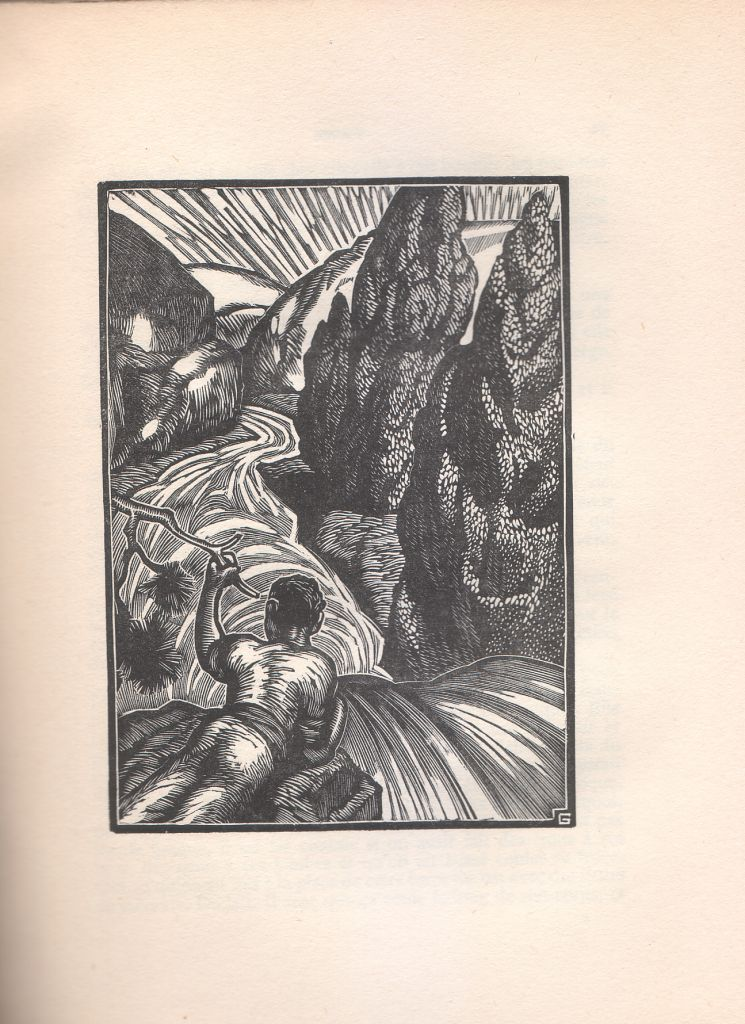
Illustrated page from Second Harvest, Louis William Graux, 1935

The Pan trilogy consists of the three novels Colline (1929), Lovers Are Never Losers (1929; French: Un de Baumugnes) and Second Harvest (1930; French: Regain). The novels contain stand-alone stories about villagers from Provence. They portray the peasant population in the face of natural calamities and the struggle for the renewal of life. They attribute creative power to the natural elements and present images of a return to humanity's mythical origin. The stories associate the landscape and population of the region with classical mythology, subtly evoking the gods Pan, Ceres and Dionysus.

== Legacy ==
Giono designated the three novels as a trilogy in his 1931 text Présentation de Pan, in which he outlines his thinking and aesthetic vision. The following year he included an accompanying short story, "Prelude to Pan", in his collection The Solitude of Compassion.

Lovers Are Never Losers and Second Harvest were adapted for cinema in the 1930s as Angèle and Harvest. Both films were directed by Marcel Pagnol and feature the actors Orane Demazis and Fernandel in leading roles.

== See also ==
- Pan in popular culture
