= Pan in popular culture =

Pan, the Greek deity, is often portrayed in cinema, literature, music, and stage productions, as a symbolic or cultural reference.

== Film ==
- Playful Pan, Silly Symphonies cartoon from 1930
- Picnic on the Grass (1959) by Jean Renoir evokes Pan with a flute-playing goatherd.
- In 7 Faces of Dr. Lao (1964), Pan appears as one of the attractions in the circus. He seduces Angela Benedict, the librarian, with his enticing music and even takes the form of the man she secretly admires, Ed Cunningham, the newspaper editor. Pan is one of the seven characters in the film played by Tony Randall.
- Don't Look Now (1973) — By Nicolas Roeg, a psychological horror film where the protagonist encounters a figure resembling Pan during a visit to Venice, exploring themes of grief and the supernatural.
- The Wicker Man (1973) by Robin Hardy, a British horror film that includes pagan themes and references to Pan, particularly in its portrayal of rituals and beliefs.
- The Dark Crystal (1982) — By Jim Henson and Frank Oz, this fantasy film involves creatures and mythological elements that resonate with themes found in ancient mythology, including the spirit of Pan.
- The Company of Wolves (1984) Directed by Neil Jordan, this film is based on Angela Carter's story collection. It includes a fantasy sequence involving Pan and explores themes of transformation and the supernatural.
- Legend (1985) Directed by Ridley Scott, this fantasy film features Tim Curry as Darkness, a character with mythological and demonic traits reminiscent of Pan.
- The Little Mermaid (1989) — In Disney's animated adaptation, there are characters and scenes that evoke the spirit of Pan and other mythological beings.
- Midsummer Night's Dream (1999) — By Michael Hoffman, this adaptation of Shakespeare's play features references to mythical creatures and spirits, including Pan-like characters.
- Sir Thaddeus (1999) Directed by Andrzej Wajda, this Polish film adaptation of Adam Mickiewicz's epic poem includes references to Pan in the context of Polish folklore and national identity.
- The Bacchae (2002) — A film adaptation of Euripides' play, which includes references to Pan among other Greek deities and mythological themes.
- The Chronicles of Narnia: The Lion, the Witch and the Wardrobe (2005) Although not directly named Pan, the character Mr. Tumnus, a faun, bears resemblance to Pan in mythology.
- Pan's Labyrinth (2006) by Guillermo del Toro (Spanish title: El Laberinto del Fauno) features a faun that is not Pan, but the design was based on Pan
- His Majesty Minor (2007) by Jean-Jacques Annaud is a French film featuring Pan as a main character.
- Percy Jackson & the Olympians: The Lightning Thief (2010) — By Chris Columbus, while primarily based on Greek mythology, this film adaptation of Rick Riordan's novel briefly references Pan and his disappearance.
- The Cabin in the Woods (2011) by Drew Goddard, In this horror-comedy, there are references to various mythological creatures, including Pan, as part of the film's broader mythological framework.
- The Witch (2015) — By Robert Eggers, set in the 1630s New England, this horror film explores themes of witchcraft and folklore that resonate with ancient mythological spirits like Pan.
- The Shape of Water (2017) — Directed by Guillermo del Toro, this film has subtle nods to Pan through its fantastical creature and themes of nature and magic.
- The Return of the Great God Pan (2025) — Directed by Brett Stillo, this horror film inspired by Arthur Machen's The Great God Pan uses the birth of Pan's child as the impetus for a neo-Pagan cult's belief in the imminent demise of Christianity.

== Literature ==
- "Pan" (1881), a double-villanelle by Oscar Wilde
- The Great God Pan (1890) by Arthur Machen
- Pan and the Young Shepherd (1898) by Maurice Hewlett
- The Moon-Slave (1901) by Barry Pain
- The Plea of Pan by Henry W. Nevinson
- The Horned Shepherd (1904) by Edgar Jepson
- "The Man Who Went Too Far" (1904) by E. F. Benson
- The Garden God (1905) by Forrest Reid
- "The Piper At The Gates Of Dawn" (1908) in The Wind in the Willows by Kenneth Grahame
- Pan-Worship and Other Poems (1908) by Eleanor Farjeon
- The Devil and the Crusader (1909), horror novel by Alice and Claude Askew
- The Triumph of Pan (1910) by Victor Neuberg
- "The Music on the Hill" (1911) by Hector Hugh Munro aka Saki
- "The Story of a Panic" (1911) by E. M. Forster
- "The Touch of Pan" (1917) by Algernon Blackwood
- Pan and the Twins (1922) by Eden Phillpotts
- The Oldest God (1926) satirical novel by Stephen McKenna
- "How Pan Came to Little Ingleton" (1926) by Margery Lawrence
- The Blessing of Pan (1927), a fantasy novel by Lord Dunsany
- The Crock of Gold (1928) by James Stephens
- The Pan trilogy by Jean Giono
  - Colline (1929)
  - Lovers Are Never Losers (1929)
  - Second Harvest (1930)
- "The People of Pan" (1929) by Henry S. Whitehead
- The Goat-Foot God (1936) by Dion Fortune
- "The Call of Wings" by Agatha Christie
- In the short story "The Magic Barrel" by Bernard Malamud, main character Pinye Salzman is compared to Pan
- "A Musical Instrument" and "The Dead Pan", poems by Elizabeth Barrett Browning
- Gravity's Rainbow (1973) by Thomas Pynchon
- Pan appears in The Circus of Dr. Lao (1935), written by Charles G. Finney and illustrated by Boris Artzybasheff, and its movie adaptation, 7 Faces of Dr. Lao(1964)
- Pan is the primary, metaphorical theme in Knut Hamsun's novel Pan (1894)
- In Jitterbug Perfume (1985) by Tom Robbins, Pan plays a prominent role throughout the whole plot
- "News For The Delphic Oracle", a poem by William Butler Yeats, published in the collection Last Poems (1939)
- "Pan With Us" is a poem by Robert Frost, published as Poem 26 from A Boy's Will.
- Pan appears in Greenmantle (1988) by Charles de Lint
- Pan appears in Cloven Hooves (1991) by Megan Lindholm aka Robin Hobb
- George Pérez's first Wonder Woman story shows a duplicitous Pan tricking Princess Diana
- In "in Just", E. E. Cummings' poem, Pan is described, metaphorically, as "the/ goat-footed/ baloonMan"
- In Peter Pan, or The Boy Who Wouldn't Grow Up by J. M. Barrie and related works, the titular character Peter Pan is based on Pan.
- "The Lawnmower Man" (May 1975) by Stephen King
- The Great God Pan (2003) by Donna Jo Napoli, Pan is involved in the Trojan War
- In the 2005–2009 book series Percy Jackson & the Olympians by Rick Riordan, Pan is a character sought out by all the satyrs for their quests. One of the main characters, Grover Underwood, was a satyr who searched for Pan until he found him dying in the Labyrinth of King Minos.
- In the dark fantasy English series Spook's (published as The Last Apprentice in the United States), Pan is mentioned and appears in three books. A witch and her allies attempt to resurrect him, and he later helps the protagonist, Tom Ward.
- In Rob Thurman's (2006) Cal Leandros series, Robin Goodfellow is introduced in the first book and becomes a close friend to the Leandros brothers. He is a trickster, used car salesmen and one of the last known Pucks in existence. He has also been known throughout history as Pan.

== Music ==
(Alphabetical by artist)

- Animal Collective has a song entitled "I See You Pan" on their release Hollinndagain.
- The medieval folk band Faun has been greatly inspired by Pan, and many of their songs are about Pan, such as "Arcadia" and "Hymn to Pan".
- "Great God Pan" is a track by SD Laika from his debut album That's Harakiri.
- In the original programme for Gustav Mahler's Third Symphony, the first movement is subtitled "Pan Awakes, Summer Marches In".
- "La Flute de Pan" (Pan et les Bergers, Pan et l'oiseaux, Pan et les Nymphes) were composed by Jules Mouquet.
- Carl Nielsen composed "Pan and Syrinx".
- Justinus Primitive produced the Pan-inspired album Praise Pan, Great God Pan, and the songs "On Becoming Water", "Praise Pan, Great God Pan", and "Transformation Mantra".
- In "Joueur de flute" by Albert Roussel, one of the four movements is named after Pan.
- "Dryades et Pan" is the last of three Myths for violin and piano, Op. 30, by Karol Szymanowski.
- We Are All Pan's People is an album by The Focus Group.
- "Pan" is a song by The Veils.
- "The Pan Within" and "The Return of Pan" are two songs by The Waterboys.
- Pan is referenced in Stevie Wonder's song "Flower Power", from his album The Secret Life of Plants.
- Pan's People, a British dance troupe from Top of the Pops, was named after Pan.
- The title of the 1967 Pink Floyd album The Piper at the Gates of Dawn is a reference to a chapter in the 1908 book The Wind in the Willows which features Pan.
- The Waterboys have a song "The Return of Pan"on their 1993 album Dream Harder.
- "The Great Pan is Dead" is a song by the artist Cold Cave, appearing on the album Cherish the Light Years.

== Plays ==
- Pan's Anniversary, a masque by Ben Jonson, originally performed in 1620 or 1621.

== Video games ==
- Pan appears in Castlevania: Lords of Shadow as advisor to main character Gabriel Belmont.
- Pan appears as a Greek god in Dungeons & Dragons.
- Pan is a high-level antagonist in the computer game Freedom Force. He plays a Pan flute that hypnotizes player characters into attacking their allies.
- Pan appears in King's Quest IV: The Perils of Rosella as a satyr playing a magical flute with hypnotic abilities.
- Pan has a supporting role in the game Rise of the Argonauts on PC, PlayStation 3 and Xbox 360.

== Other ==
- Pan is worshiped by Merle Highchurch, one of the main characters in the Dungeons & Dragons comedy podcast The Adventure Zone. Pan speaks to Merle on several occasions during the story.
- Pan is dead (still life), a 1911 painting by George Washington Lambert
- Pan is a villain in the third season of the Netflix series Chilling Adventures of Sabrina. His gaze causes the witch Agatha to go insane.
