= Prix Brentano =

The Prix Brentano was a literary award given annually by the American bookstore chain Brentano's to a French novel that "illustrate[s] eminently the French cultural ideal". The first award (with a check for $1,000) was given in 1929.

The prize was installed to present a French novel in English translation to an American reading public. The first "Committee of Honor" comprised poet and diplomat Paul Claudel, diplomat and politician Myron T. Herrick, and Irish novelist George Moore. The French audience was presented a high-paying award supposedly free of the machinations of French juried prizes. Jacques Le Clerq, translator of the first two winning novels, said that since the jury was composed of foreigners there could be "no manoeuvres of cliques such as must necessarily attend French prize awards". At the time, it was the highest-paying literary award beside the Nobel Prize in Literature. The prizewinning novel was subsequently translated into English and published by Brentano's. The first jury included translator Lewis Galantière, novelist and critic Malcolm Cowley, and Jacques Le Clerq, and unanimously awarded the prize to Jean Giono's debut novel Colline, translated in English as Hill of Destiny. The second was awarded to Jeanne Galzy for Burnt Offering. It does not appear as if any more were awarded after 1930.

== Winners ==
- Jean Giono, Hill of Destiny, 1929
- Jeanne Galzy, Burnt Offering, 1930
