= Ferdinand Larose =

Canadian agronomist (1888–1955)

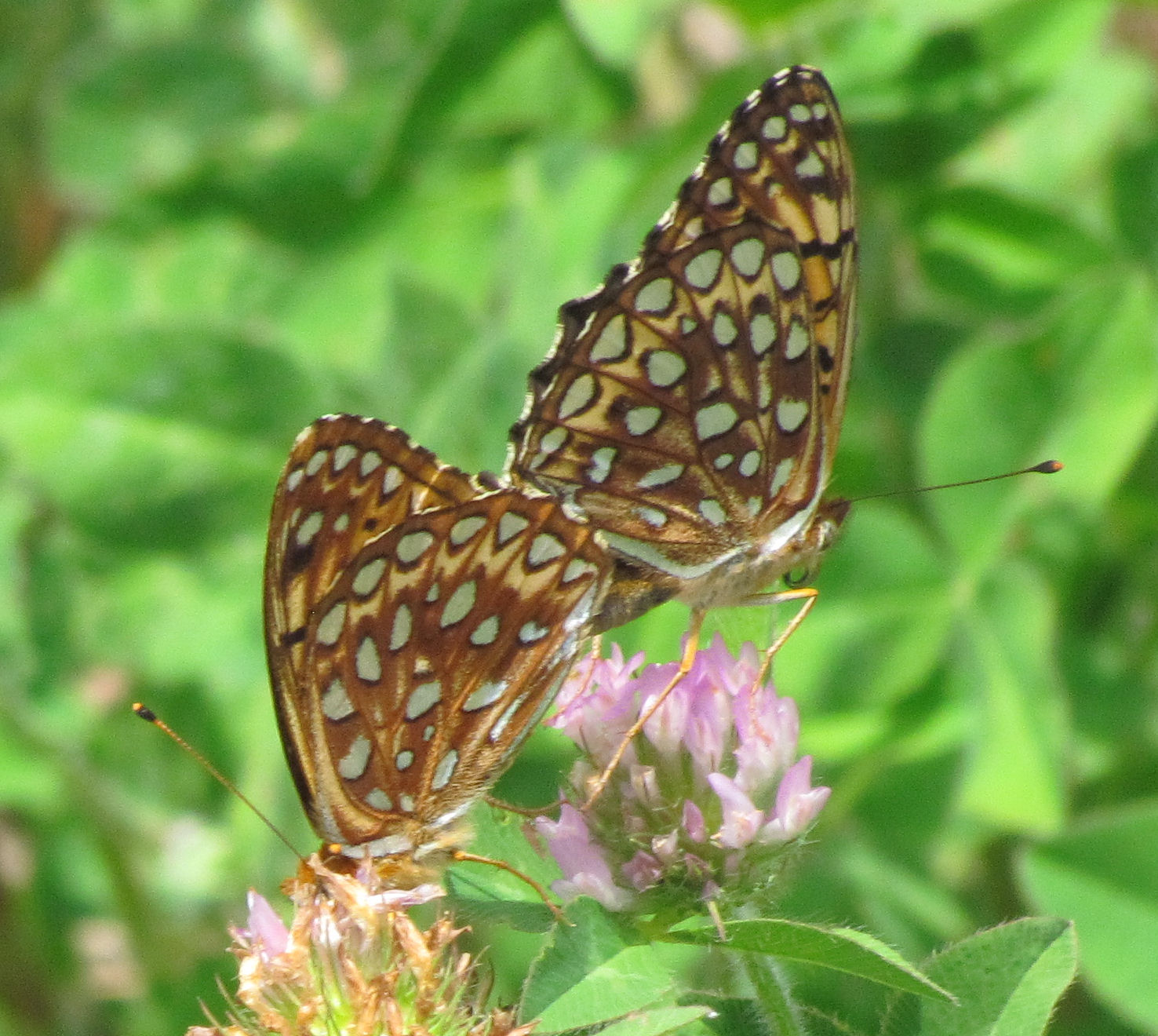
Atlantis fritillaries, mating in Larose Forest

Ferdinand Alphonse Fortunat Larose (April 1, 1888 - January 29, 1955) was a French Canadian agronomist, best known for having created in Ontario one of the largest regeneration forests in the 1920s, which was named after him.

== Biography ==
Born in Sarsfield, Ontario, Larose studied at the University of Ottawa, where he obtained his diplomas B.A. in 1910 and B.Ph. in 1912 and L.Ph. (Philosophy). He later studied at the Agricultural Institute of Oka (CAE), graduating in Agronomic Sciences in 1919. The same year, he became employed in the service of the Ontario Department of Agriculture.

Having established an office in Plantagenet, in the United Counties of Prescott and Russell, he started an inventory of agricultural lands. Discovering that the area around Bourget was a desert of abandoned sandy soil farmland and presented signs of erosion yielding to the advance of the "Bourget Desert", he suggested reforesting this "Bourget Desert" and launched a plan to sow a forest. Ferdinand Larose had set up a small-scale reforestation experiment with seeds and planting trees in 1921-1923 (the Plantagenet Demonstration Woodlot). In 1926 he started a wasteland utilization campaign in Prescott and Russell counties.

In 1927, he became the secretary of the newly founded Committee of Conservation and Reforestation of the United Counties. In 1928 he obtained permission to work on a large-scale reforestation. For this, in 1928, the United Counties of Prescott and Russell acquired, on Larose's insistence, the territory of the future forest. This Prescot and Russel County forest, later called Larose Forest, became one of the largest man and hand planted forest in Canada. It covers an area of 110 square km in Clarence-Rockland, The Nation, Alfred and Plantagenet and Russell territories. Larose was then nicknamed The Man Who Planted Trees, after the short novel by the French nature writer Jean Giono. He continued stimulating the selling of abandoned farms by the united counties for further reforestation.

He also organized in the late 1930s forest-visiting tours to convince politicians to invest in better reforestation. As a result, he had sped the reforestation to about 1 million trees planted annually at the end of the 1940s, early 1950s.

Larose was largely involved in organizing farmers and was one of the founders of the Union des cultivateurs franco-ontariens in 1929. Larose also contributed to agricultural education by the creation of agricultural school-clubs for boys and girls in 1935 in each parish of the united Counties.

He also fought for teaching in French and gave agricultural courses in French in Kent and Essex Counties (1934). At his request, circles of French women farmers were created in those counties in 1936. With the support of Antonin Lalonde, the president of the Catholic Union of the Franco-Ontarian farmers, Larose also obtained sewing and cooking education in French for the farmers' wives.

Larose retired in 1950 and was succeeded by Lawrence Faber. He died January 29, 1955, in Montreal at age 66 and is buried in the Plantagenet cemetery.

== Honours ==
In 1988, the Franco-Ontarian Agricultural Merit was awarded for the first time. The first two winners were Larose and Antonin Lalonde (1911–1985), both posthumously.

In 2004, the Ferdinand Larose Environmental Prize was established in his honor by the French Canadian Association of Ontario and Prescott Russell. The prize was awarded for the first time in 2007, posthumously, to Ernest Hurtubise, of Bourget, the spiritual son of Larose . Gilles Trahan, (Hawkesbury educator), was the 2008 winner and in 2014, the family business Legault Les Serres .

== Larose Forest ==
As of 2016, the 10,700 hectare forest, originally a man-made conifer plantation, is a mature mixed forest with a diversity of trees including maples, wild flowers, insects and many species of birds and other animals, including mooses. "Three generations of forest workers have successively planted trees and maintained the forest. In all, more than 18 million trees have been planted".

== Publication ==
- Ferdinand Larose, The south Nation and its environment in: Conservation in Eastern Ontario, 1947.
