= His Majesty Minor =

- Film poster
- French: Sa majesté Minor
- Directed by: Jean-Jacques Annaud
- Written by: Jean-Jacques Annaud; Gérard Brach; Sandro Agenor
- Produced by: Jean-Jacques Annaud; Xavior Castano
- Starring: José Garcia; Vincent Cassel
- Cinematography: Jean-Marie Dreujou
- Edited by: Noëlle Boisson
- Music by: Javier Navarrete
- Production companies: Malvarrosa Media; Mediapro; Pathe Renn Productions; StudioCanal
- Distributed by: Mars Distribution; StudioCanal (France); Alta Films; Mediapro (Spain)
- Release dates: October 10, 2007 (France); December 12, 2008 (Spain)
- Countries: France; Spain
- Language: French
- Budget: $30.4 million
- Box office: $2.3 million

His Majesty Minor (French: Sa majesté Minor) is a feature film by French director Jean-Jacques Annaud. It is his third film shot entirely in his native language of French since his 1976 Oscar-winning debut Black and White in Color and his 1979 film Coup de tête featuring Patrick Dewaere. It is a mythical comedy taking place on an island in the Aegean Sea before the founding of Ancient Greece.

It was filmed in 2006 in Benitatxell and Benigembla, basically in the district of the Marina Alta, which is located in the Valencian Community.

The film was produced by French companies StudioCanal and Pathé in partnership with Malvarrosa Media and Mediapro in Spain.

Despite its originality, the film was poorly received, both by critics and the audience.

== Plot ==
Minor was found as a baby in a ship wreck on a beach, lying next to the dead body of his mother. He was raised by a pack of pigs; he speaks in porcine grunts and lives and loves much like his fellow hogs. Minor is just human enough to have his head turned by Clytia, a beautiful girl living in the nearby village. However, if Minor's lack of social skills weren't enough to keep Clytia away, she's already been pledged to wed handsome and charming Karkos. When Minor runs afoul of the tribal leadership, he's removed from his home with the pigs and forced to live in an enchanted forest, where he attracts the not entirely welcome attentions of Pan (Cassel), a randy half-man and half-goat willing to couple with anything that breathes. When Minor emerges from the forest able to speak with newfound eloquence, the tribal leaders name him their new potentate, and Clytia suddenly finds him a great deal more appealing, which doesn't sit well with Karkos.

== Cast ==
- José García as Minor
- Vincent Cassel as Satyre
- Sergio Peris-Mencheta as Karkos
- Mélanie Bernier as Clytia
- Claude Brasseur as Firos
- Rufus as Rectus
- Jean-Luc Bideau as Archeo

== See also ==
- Pan in popular culture
