= Second Harvest =

Second Harvest may refer to:

- Second Harvest Toronto, Canada's largest food rescue charitable organization
- America's Second Harvest, now Feeding America, a United States–based non-profit organization
- Second Harvest (novel), a 1930 novel by Jean Giono
