= Savage Souls (film) =

2001 film

- Theatrical release poster
- Directed by: Raúl Ruiz
- Screenplay by: Alexandre Astruc; Mitchell Hooper; Alain Majani d'Inguimbert; Eric Neuhoff
- Based on: Les Âmes fortes by Jean Giono
- Produced by: Dimitri de Clercq; Marc de Lassus Saint-Geniès
- Starring: Laetitia Casta
- Cinematography: Eric Gautier
- Edited by: Béatrice Clérico; Valeria Sarmiento
- Distributed by: Gemini Films (France); JMH Distribution (Switzerland)
- Release date: 22 May 2001
- Running time: 120 minutes
- Countries: France, Belgium, Switzerland
- Language: French
- Budget: $4.9 million
- Box office: $1.7 million

Savage Souls (French: Les âmes fortes) is a 2001 French costume drama film directed by Chilean filmmaker Raúl Ruiz. It is based on the 1949 novel Les Âmes fortes by Jean Giono. It was screened out of competition at the 2001 Cannes Film Festival.

== Cast ==
- Laetitia Casta as Thérèse
  - Monique Mélinand as Old Thérèse
- Frédéric Diefenthal as Firmin
- Arielle Dombasle as Madame Numance
- John Malkovich as Monsieur Numance
- Charles Berling as Reveillard
- Johan Leysen as Rampal
- Édith Scob as Funeral woman
- Christian Vadim as The pastor
- Carlos Lopez as Le muet
- Jacqueline Staup as Deuxième femme veillée
- Corine Blue as Jeune femme veillée
- Aimé Lebedel as Vieux chanteur
- Nathalie Boutefeu as Charlotte
- Marc Dantes as Forgerons
