= The Baker's Wife =

The Baker's Wife may refer to:

- The Baker's Wife (film) (French: La Femme du boulanger), made by Marcel Pagnol in 1938
- The Baker's Wife (musical), adapted from the film by Joseph Stein with music and lyrics by Stephen Schwartz, in 1976
