= L'Homme qui plantait des arbres (comic book) =

2025 comic book by Florence Lebonvallet and Daniel Casanave

- Page count: 163 pages
- Publisher: Gallimard BD

Creative team
- Writer: Florence Lebonvallet, after Jean Giono
- Artist: Daniel Casanave
- Colourist: Claire Champion

Original publication
- Date of publication: 3 September 2025
- Language: French
- ISBN: 9782075224116

L'Homme qui plantait des arbres (lit. 'The Man Who Planted Trees') is a 2025 French comic book written by Florence Lebonvallet and drawn by Daniel Casanave.

== Plot ==
Set from 1910 til 1947, it is about Elzéard Bouffier, a lone shepherd and later beekeeper, who plants trees in an inhospitable mountainous area in Haut-Provence with the long-term goal of turning it into a lush forest. It is based on the short story "The Man Who Planted Trees" by Jean Giono, which in turn was inspired by Giono's father's habit of planting acorns.

== Reception ==
The 163-page comic book was published by Gallimard BD on September 3, 2025.

Benjamin Roure of BoDoï called it an elegant adaptation that can appeal to readers of all ages. Benoit Marchon of ActuaBD wrote that the adaptation succeeds in bringing forth what is left unsaid in Giono's original text, and is drawn powerfully with Casanave's "rugged realism" and warm and bright tones from the colourist Claire Champion.

== See also ==
- The Man Who Planted Trees, a 1987 short film based on the same story
