= Le Chant du monde (film) =

1965 film

- Directed by: Marcel Camus
- Starring: Hardy Krüger; Catherine Deneuve; Charles Vanel; Marilù Tolo; Serge Marquand; Reinhard Kolldehoff
- Music by: André Hossein
- Release date: 1965
- Country: Italy
- Language: Italian
- Box office: $6.4 million

Le Chant du monde is a 1965 Italian film directed by Marcel Camus. It is based on the novel The Song of the World (Fr. Le Chant du monde, 1934) by French author Jean Giono.
