= The Man Who Planted Trees (film) =

1987 film

- Film poster
- Directed by: Frédéric Back
- Written by: Jean Roberts
- Based on: The Man Who Planted Trees by Jean Giono
- Produced by: Frédéric Back; Hubert Tison
- Narrated by: Philippe Noiret; Christopher Plummer
- Edited by: Norbert Pickering
- Music by: Normand Roger
- Production companies: CBC; Societe Radio-Canada
- Distributed by: Direct Cinema Limited
- Release date: May 1987
- Running time: 30 minutes
- Country: Canada
- Languages: French; English

The Man Who Planted Trees (French: L'homme qui plantait des arbres) is a 1987 Canadian short animated film directed by Frédéric Back. It is based on Jean Giono's 1953 short story The Man Who Planted Trees. This 30-minute film was distributed in two versions, French and English, narrated respectively by actors Philippe Noiret and Christopher Plummer, and produced by Radio-Canada.

== Awards ==
The film won the Academy Award (1988) for Best Animated Short Film. In his acceptance speech, Back shared his Oscar with "all the women and men who plant trees and hope and work so hard to protect forests, wildlife, the health and the beauty of this world".

The film also competed for the Short Film Palme d'Or at the 1987 Cannes Film Festival. The film won the Golden Sheaf Award for Best Animation at the 1988 Yorkton Film Festival.

In 1994, it was voted number 44 of The 50 Greatest Cartoons of all time by members of the animation field.

== See also ==
- L'Homme qui plantait des arbres, a 2025 comic book based on the same story
