= Burnt Offering (novel) =

1929 novel by Jeanne Galzy

- 1934 French edition
- Author: Jeanne Galzy
- Language: French
- Genre: Drama
- Publisher: Éditions Rieder
- Publication date: 1929
- Publication place: France
- English publication date: 1930
- Media type: Print

Burnt Offering (French: L'initiatrice aux mains vides) is a French novel by Jeanne Galzy. Published in French in 1929, it won the 1930 Prix Brentano and was subsequently published in English, as the only one in this language out of the author's many novels.

While the novel (and the translation) received some praise in 1930 and 1931, it was never a great success in its time. Though now it is appreciated by critics for its study of the main character, Marie, a school teacher struggling with her (lesbian) desire for one of her students. Autobiographical elements permeating the novel have also been studied; these include the novel's perspective on the school where Marie and the author both worked, the Lycée Lamartine in Paris; and the college where they both received their education, the École normale supérieure de jeunes filles in Sèvres.

== Plot ==
Marie Pascal is a single woman who teaches seventh-grade "literature, geography, history, everything" at a small school in a small town in Picardy. Her very quotidian life ("the emotional vacuum that overcomes a young educator, once her school career is finished") changes when one of her students, 12-year-old Annette Rieu (whose father died in World War I "because he suffered too much (31)), writes an essay containing the sentence, "The saddest day of my life comes back every week, the day when Mother entertains her friends and I hear the sound of laughter" (25). Until then, Annette had not drawn attention to herself, but her essay prompts a fascination and attraction in the childless and single Marie that she finds hard to control, only to find out that her love for the child seems to be reciprocated. Annette blossoms under the attention paid to her, holds the door for her teacher, plucks the most beautiful flowers for her, and waits for her every afternoon after school to say goodbye. Initially reciprocating the child's devotion, Marie herself grows as a person and as a teacher, and is even recommended by a school inspector to transfer to a school in Paris. She declines, and finds it difficult to act on the child's attention and on two occasions even rebuffs her.

During a vacation, which Marie spends as usual with her grandparents in the country, she receives a letter from Annette, declaring her love. No longer able to disguise or justify her feelings as maternal, Marie responds by withdrawing her affection. The child, however, falls ill with pneumonia, and on the night the child's fever breaks, it is Marie who is with her, instead of Annette's mother, who thereafter becomes hostile, pulls the child from school, and forces Marie to transfer to another school. Annette does leave a token of love: the name "Marie" carved in her school desk.

== Publication and critical reception ==
Burnt Offering is the seventh novel by Jeanne Galzy. It was published in France by Éditions Rieder in 1929, and since it won the 1930 Prix Brentano (the second and last installment of that award) it was translated to English by the Brentano's.

The few French and English reviews at the time of publication were positive. It was called a "very sad" and a "very beautiful" novel. The translation made by Jacques Le Clercq was also praised. Elizabeth N. Case, writing in the Hartford Daily Courant, called it a "delicate sensitive study in character", though she states in the same breath that it "is manifestly one of those novels which inevitably lose definitely through translation". According to Case, the translation was somewhat "a restrained record of a French provincial school teacher, who yearned for all the elemental joys of a normal environment, is absolutely and essential Gallic, an appealing book even in its English form, but with its informing fire damped and dimmed through transference to an alien tongue". The novel has long been out of print.

== Background and interpretation ==
Critics agree that Burnt Offering, like La Femme chez les garçons (1919), reflects Galzy's experiences as a teacher at the Lycée Lamartine in Paris. To deflect the charge of autobiographical fallacy critics present the novel as a roman à clef rather than as an autobiography. Another autobiographical element is offered by the dedication in the French edition, to Mademoiselle Germaine Normand, Galzy's first-grade teacher in high school in Montpellier. Like Galzy, Marie attended the École normale supérieure de jeunes filles in Sèvres—reputedly a hotbed of lesbianism in those days, and a setting also in Galzy's 1934 novel Jeunes filles en serre chaude.

Critic Jennifer Waelti-Walters, in a 2000 study of lesbian novels, argues that Galzy during her writing career "sidles up to the issue of lesbian desire gradually"; Burnt Offering is the first of three lesbianism-themed novels by Galzy. Lesbian love, according to Waeti-Walters, is a more or less secret alternative to the only two kinds of love women were allowed to express: maternal love and heterosexual love; as a consequence, Galzy's (and other) characters have "no models and no language for what they are experiencing and no place to situate themselves socially". In Galzy's first such novel, the love between the two women is no more than implicit.
