= Two Riders of the Storm =

Novel by Jean Giono

- First English-language edition
- Author: Jean Giono
- Original title: Deux cavaliers de l'orage
- Translator: Alan Brown
- Language: French
- Publisher: Gallimard (French); Peter Owen (English)
- Publication date: 1965
- Publication place: France
- English publication date: 1967
- Pages: 230

Two Riders of the Storm (French: Deux cavaliers de l'orage) is a 1965 novel by the French writer Jean Giono. An English translation by Alan Brown was published in 1967. The book was the basis for the 1984 film Les Cavaliers de l'orage, directed by Gérard Vergez. The film received the award for Best Music and was nominated for Best Set Design at the 10th César Awards.
