= Les Âmes fortes =

1949 novel by Jean Giono

- Author: Jean Giono
- Publisher: Éditions Gallimard
- Publication date: 1949
- Pages: 339

Les Âmes fortes ("the strong souls") is a 1949 novel by the French writer Jean Giono. It was the basis for the 2001 film Savage Souls, directed by Raúl Ruiz.
