= 1940 New York Film Critics Circle Awards =

6th New York Film Critics Circle Awards

6th New York Film Critics Circle Awards

January ?, 1941
(announced December 30, 1940)

The Grapes of Wrath

The 6th New York Film Critics Circle Awards, announced on 30 December 1940, honored the best filmmaking of 1940.

== Winners ==
- Best Film:
  - The Grapes of Wrath
- Best Actor:
  - Charlie Chaplin – The Great Dictator
- Best Actress:
  - Katharine Hepburn – The Philadelphia Story
- Best Director:
  - John Ford – The Grapes of Wrath and The Long Voyage Home
- Best Foreign Film:
  - The Baker's Wife (La femme du boulanger) • France
- Special Award:
  - Walt Disney and Leopold Stokowski – Fantasia
