= The Song of the World =

Novel by the French writer Jean Giono

- First edition cover
- Author: Jean Giono
- Original title: Le Chant du monde
- Translator: Henri Fluchère; Geoffrey Myers
- Language: French
- Publisher: Éditions Gallimard
- Publication date: 16 May 1934
- Publication place: France
- English publication date: 1937
- Pages: 318

The Song of the World (French: Le Chant du monde) is a 1934 novel by the French writer Jean Giono. The narrative portrays a river and human vendettas as a part of nature. The story contains references to the Iliad. Its themes and view on nature were heavily inspired by Walt Whitman's poetry collection Leaves of Grass. It was adapted into the 1965 film Le Chant du monde, directed by Marcel Camus.

== Publication ==
The novel was serialised in Revue de Paris from 1 March to 15 April 1934. Éditions Gallimard published the book on 16 May the same year. An English translation by Henri Fluchère and Geoffrey Myers was published in 1937.

== Reception ==
John Chamberlain wrote in Scribner's Magazine: "Even in spite of the strained images Giono is always en rapport with his scene; he loves the river, the trees, and the hills of his country with a love that is fortunately nine-tenths curiosity. ... Even if you can't stand Homeric madmen you should be able to find much to your taste in The Song of the World." Chamberlain continued: "The real idiocy is not the story, but Giono's attitude towards his own product and his own world. The present time, he says, disgusts him; hence his desire to escape from contemporaneity to the far more 'natural' world of the primitive Basses-Alpes, where the peasants still live as they lived two or three hundred years ago. ... He seems to be telling us that primitive man lived a much less conventional and inhibited life than we moderns; he also implies, somewhat paradoxically, that values and order both exist for primitive people, whereas confusion and disorder make the world a hell for the people of 1937. Just why he should think thus is beyond me."

== Adaptations ==
The novel was adapted into the 1965 film Le Chant du monde, directed by Marcel Camus.

It was the basis for the 2019 comic book Le Chant du monde by Jacques Ferrandez.
