= Blue Boy (novel) =

1932 novel by French writer Jean Giono

- Author: Jean Giono
- Original title: Jean le Bleu
- Translator: Katherine A. Clarke
- Language: French
- Publisher: Éditions Grasset
- Publication date: 1932
- Publication place: France
- English publication date: 1946
- Pages: 316

Blue Boy (French: Jean le Bleu) is a 1932 novel by French writer Jean Giono. It tells the story of a family in Provence, with an ironer mother and a shoemaker father. The book is largely autobiographical and based on Giono's childhood, although it has many fictional anecdotes. An English translation by Katherine A. Clarke was published in 1946.

== Adaptations ==
The novel was the basis for Marcel Pagnol's 1938 film The Baker's Wife. The film stars Raimu, Ginette Leclerc and Charles Blavette. Pagnol's film was in turn adapted into the American musical The Baker's Wife, which premiered in 1976. It was also the basis for the 2010 television film La Femme du boulanger, directed by Dominique Thiel.
