= Jeunes filles en serre chaude =

1934 novel by Jeanne Galzy

Cover, 1934

Jeunes filles en serre chaude (Young girls in a hothouse) is a 1934 novel by the French author Jeanne Galzy. Its protagonists are young women at the École normale supérieure de jeunes filles in Sèvres, a suburb of Paris, at the time a girls-only school. The school, which Galzy herself attended, trained girls especially as teachers for the secondary education system. The background for the events in the novel is the 50th anniversary of the secondary school system for women; it is one of many French novels and other (autobiographical) texts of the period in which authors' school and university experiences were recounted.

Following Burnt Offering (1929) and Les Démons de la solitude (1931), it is the third novel by Galzy (this one with a "seductive title") to explore lesbian desire. The intergenerational love in the novel (between a teacher, Gladys Benz, and a student, Isabelle, told from Isabelle's point of view) is likewise a reflection of Galzy's own experiences. The school was reputed to be a "breeding ground of homosexual relationship", and had earlier been the subject of a novel exploring same-sex desire, Les Sévriennes (1900) by Gabrielle Reval.

Like most of Galzy's novels, Jeunes filles is neglected by modern readers, though it did attract some attention at the time of publication. A French reviewer remarked that the novel shows that "overworked brains" sometimes fall prey to "dangerous aberrations". A brief note in The Modern Language Journal remarked that "trivial but intensely human emotional reactions are realistically depicted", and the 1935 New International Year Book warned that the students depicted in the book have a "strong emotional reaction of an undesirable nature". The book is no longer in print; passages from it were anthologized in a 1985 collection of erotic women's literature.
