= A King Without Distraction =

- Theatrical release poster
- Directed by: François Leterrier
- Screenplay by: Jean Giono
- Based on: Un roi sans divertissement by Jean Giono
- Produced by: Andrée Debar
- Cinematography: Jean Badal
- Edited by: Françoise Javet
- Music by: Jacques Brel; Maurice Jarre
- Release date: 30 August 1963
- Running time: 84 minutes
- Country: France
- Language: French

A King Without Distraction (French: Un roi sans divertissement) is a 1963 French mystery film directed by François Leterrier, starring Claude Giraud and Colette Renard. The story is set in the winter of 1843 and follows a police captain who investigates the disappearance of several little girls from a village.

The film is based on the novel Un roi sans divertissement by Jean Giono. The title quotes Blaise Pascal, "Qu'on laisse un roi tout seul sans aucune satisfaction des sens, sans aucun soin de l'esprit, sans compagnies et sans divertissements, penser à lui tout à loisir, et l'on verra qu'un roi sans divertissement est un homme plein de misères." (Pensées, 1670, posth.). It was shot in the village Les Hermaux, on the Aubrac plateau in Aveyron. It was Claude Giraud's first leading role in a film. It was released in France on 30 August 1963.

== Cast ==
- Claude Giraud as Captain Langlois
- Colette Renard as Clara
- Charles Vanel as the prosecutor
- Albert Rémy as the mayor
- René Blancard as the priest
- Pierre Repp as Ravanel

== Summary ==
https://www.impetueux.com/un-roi-sans-divertissement/

== Theme ==
The title of the film is derived from French philosopher Blaise Pascal’s Pensées (1670) "Qu'on laisse un roi tout seul sans aucune satisfaction des sens, sans aucun soin de l'esprit, sans compagnies et sans divertissements, penser à lui tout à loisir, et l'on verra qu'un roi sans divertissement est un homme plein de misères." (Pensées, 1670, posth.). "Let a king be left all alone without any satisfaction of the senses, without any care of the mind, without company and without entertainment, think of him at leisure, and we will see that a king without entertainment is a man full of miseries."

Leterrier’s film juxtaposes the realms the murderer and the non-murderer, demonstrating that the boundary between the two is fragile. Un roi sans divertissement confronts the movie audience with their own homicidal potential.

In this “small masterpiece of benighted romanticism”, an upright young captain of the gendarmerie, Langlois (Claude Girard) is tasked with accounting for the disappearance of a number of little girls in a remote snowbound village. Despite his high rectitude, the Captain discovers himself susceptible to the same impulses that motivate the sociopath he seeks to discover. A village elder and former public prosecutor (Charles Vanel), counsels the officer that the perpetrator responsible for the disappearances is likely a model citizen of the community, and whose “base instincts” are not easily discernible. Thematically, this is a key transitional point in the film: appearances can lie, and the seeds of depravity may be concealed by the young officers’ own handsome visage.

As Captain Langlois struggles to define the criminal’s motivation, he begins to display a cold indifference to death as he toys with the corpse of a small bird he has crushed with his hands. Although he refrains from an impulse to assault Clara, the inn’s proprietor and former prostitute (Colette Renard), the officers identity is rapidly disintegrating. When Langlois simultaneously discovers the bodies of the murdered girls and spots the suspected killer retreating slowly through the frozen landscape, he pursues the suspect. The two men move in synchronicity as the murderer leads his pursuer to his home, which as predicted by the prosecutor is a conventional abode with wife and children. When confronted with his crime, the sociopath mildly affirms his guilt. The officer escorts the man outside and shoots him. Film historian offers this summation of the film’s denouement:

“At the moment of actually killing, Langlois takes on the disquieting insanity of the killer. Now the film enters its final phase, an extension of the atmosphere that Leterrier has established so subtly...Langlois, a cord stretched tight between his hands, looks through the window of a house in the village. There are children inside. With an effort of will, Langlois turns his [homicidal] passion against himself. In the last frame, the handsome face is dead, and the blood of Langlois is red on the snow.”

== Sources ==
- Gow, Gordon. 1968. Suspense in the Cinema. Castle Books, New York. The Tanvity Press and A. S. Barnes & Co. Inc. Library of Congress Catalog Card No: 68-15196.
