= Fire in the Straw =

1939 film

- Directed by: Jean Benoît-Lévy
- Written by: Jean Benoît-Lévy; Henry Troyat (novel)
- Produced by: Jean Benoît-Lévy; Antoine de Rouvre; Jacques Schwob-d'Héricourt
- Starring: Lucien Baroux; Orane Demazis; Gaby Basset
- Cinematography: Raymond Clunie; Jean Lallier; Pierre Lebon; Marcel Lucien
- Edited by: Jacques Desagneaux
- Music by: Marcel Lattès
- Production company: Véga Films
- Distributed by: Compagnie Française Cinématographique
- Release date: 14 December 1939
- Running time: 89 minutes
- Country: France
- Language: French

Fire in the Straw (French: Le feu de paille) is a 1939 French drama film directed by Jean Benoît-Lévy and starring Lucien Baroux, Orane Demazis and Gaby Basset. The film's sets were designed by the art director Robert-Jules Garnier.

== Cast ==
- Lucien Baroux as Antoine Vautier
- Orane Demazis as Jeanne Vautier
- Gaby Basset as Reine Roy
- Jean Fuller as Christian Vautier
- Jeanne Fusier-Gir as Madame Goulevin, la concierge
- Florence Luchaire as La petite Caroline
- Jeanne Helbling as Monica
- Henri Lanoë as Désiré, le fils de la concierge
- Raymond Aimos as Guérétrain
- Henri Nassiet as Despagnat
- Stéphane Audel
- Edmond Beauchamp
- Andrée Brabant
- Albert Broquin
- Robert Brunet
- Claire Gérard
- Jane Pierson
- Pierre Sarda
- Adrienne Trenkel
- Jacques Vitry

== Bibliography ==
- Philippe Rège. Encyclopedia of French Film Directors, Volume 1. Scarecrow Press, 2009.
