= Jeanne Galzy =

French novelist and biographer

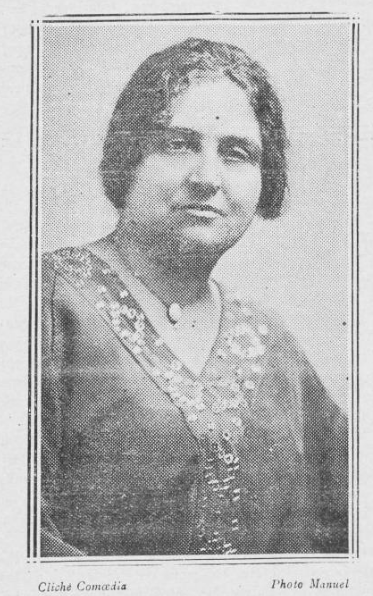
- Jeanne Galzy in 1923
- Born: Louise Jeanne Baraduc; 1883; Montpellier, France
- Died: 1977 (aged 93–94); Montpellier, France
- Resting place: Protestant Cemetery, Montpellier
- Occupations: Novelist, biographer
- Writing career
- Language: French
- Genres: Lesbian fiction, regional fiction, biography, drama
- Notable work: Les Allongés
- Notable awards: Prix Femina

Jeanne Galzy (1883–1977), born Louise Jeanne Baraduc, was a French novelist and biographer from Montpellier. She was a long-time member of the jury for the Prix Femina. Largely forgotten today, she was known as a regional author, but also wrote three novels early in her career that explore lesbian topics; she has been referred to as one of the "pioneers in the writing of lesbian desire and despair."

== Biography ==
Galzy was born in 1883 in Montpellier, France, the daughter of a wholesaler and an unpublished poet. She grew up in a Protestant environment and went to better schools, exceedingly rare for a young girl of the time. She studied at the École normale supérieure de jeunes filles in Sèvres and passed the agrégation competitive exam.

In 1915, she gained a position teaching at the boys' lycée in Montpellier; she was the first woman to teach at the school and replaced a man who had died in the trenches of World War I. While teaching, she contracted tuberculosis, and went to convalesce in Berck. This experience led her to write Les Allongés, which received the Prix Femina in 1923. She went back to teaching, but after suffering a relapse devoted her life to writing.

Having published five novels, a play, and having received a number of literary awards, in 1929 she delivered a novel of lesbian love between a teacher and a student, L'Initiatrice aux mains vides, translated in English as Burnt Offering and the winner of the 1930 Prix Brentano (which earned her $1000 and a translation of her book in English). Jeunes Filles en serre chaude (1934) aimed to be the portrait of the students of the École normale supérieure in Sèvres; the school was reputed to be a "breeding ground of homosexual relationship," and had earlier been the subject of a novel exploring same-sex desire, Les Sevriennes (1900) by Gabrielle Réval. Galzy was a member of the jury for the Prix Femina for more than five decades.

== Themes and critiques, appreciation ==
Galzy's novels are frequently regarded as romans à clef—transcribing her personal experiences. Thus, in La Femme chez les garçons and L'Initiatrice aux mains vides she is considered to recount her own life as a teacher in Paris, and likewise Les Allongés is supposed to treat solely her two-year disease. Galzy herself resisted such a reading (called the "autobiographical fallacy" by literary critics), claiming that writing fiction allowed her a detachment from reality. In Les Allongés, for instance, readers should find, besides a possible biographical connection, "a more general metaphysical investigation and validation of human suffering." Critics note, however, that explicit denials that a given novel is a roman à clef are often a rhetorical move; such a denial is given on the first page of Jeunes Filles en serre chaude, a novel of "intergenerational love" (between teacher and student) in a "pedagogic context" similar to Galzy's experiences at the École normale supérieure which questions "the suitability of contemporary educational opportunities for young women".

Three novels written relatively early in Galzy's career explore lesbian desire, L'Initiatrice aux mains vides, Les Démons de la solitude, and Jeunes Filles en serre chaude, written between 1929 and 1934. According to one critic, Galzy did not initially approach lesbianism as an issue of gender but as a problem of the social imperative against expressing same-sex attraction:

The ambiguity that interests Jeanne Galzy concerns not gender but rather her characters' process of realizing that their feelings are indeed those of love for other women. Her protagonists have no place to situate themselves socially. Heterosexuality and motherhood are the only modes of love publicly available in their world. As a result it is not surprising Galzy sidles up to the issue of lesbian desire gradually.

L'Initiatrice features a single schoolteacher who develops a relationship with a younger student. In Les Démons, a father and his daughter (who already has an intimate female friend) fall in love with the same girl. Jeunes Filles is the most explicit of the three, and again a relationship develops between a student and her teacher, in a possible love that is ultimately frustrating. Later in her career she would again return to lesbian themes in the series of novels published as La Surprise de vivre (1969–1976).

In her time, Galzy enjoyed a measure of popularity and literary recognition. She was a member of the salon of Natalie Clifford Barney and was read by (and presumably influenced) writers such as Marguerite Yourcenar; Hélène de Monferrand was strongly influenced by her. Galzy, like other women writers of her generation (the period between the two World Wars), has suffered from critical neglect that she "deserves to be better known today" is a common statement in many publications on her. Her work, as well as that of authors like Marguerite Audoux and Catherine Pozzi, is relatively unknown today and many of her books are no longer in print.

== Works ==
- Les Allongés, Ferenczi, 1923; Gallimard, 1975
- La Femme chez les garçons, F. Rieder, 1924
- La Grand rue (Main Street), Rieder, 1925
- Le Retour dans la vie, F. Rieder, 1926
- Sainte Thérèse d'Avila (Saint Teresa of Avila), 1927
- Le Retour dans la vie, 1929
- L'Initiatrice aux mains vides (The Initiator with the Empty Hands), Rieder, 1929 – published in English as Burnt Offering, 1930
- Les Démons de la solitude (Demons of Solitude), 1931
- Jeunes filles en serre chaude ("Young girls in the hothouse"), Gallimard, 1934
- Le Village rêve, Nouvelle Revue Française (NRF), 1935
- Catherine de Médicis, NRF "Leurs figures", 1936
- Les Démons de la solitude (Demons of Solitude), Rieder, 1936
- Margot, reine sans royaume (Margo, Queen without a Realm), NRF "Leurs Figures", 1939
- Les Oiseaux des îles (The Birds of the Islands), NRF, 1941
- Pays perdu (Lost Country), NRF, 1943
- Diane de Joannis de Chateaublanc, 1943
- La Cage de fer (The Iron Cage), NRF, 1946
- George Sand, Julliard, 1950
- La Femme étrangère (The Foreign Woman), 1950
- La Jeunesse déchirée (Torn Youth), 1952
- Celle qui vint d'ailleurs, 1958
- La Fille (The Girl), 1961
- La Surprise de vivre, 1969
  - La Surprise de vivre, Gallimard NRF, 1969; Double Interligne, 1997
  - Les Sources vives : la surprise de vivre II, NRF, 1971
  - La Cavalière : la surprise de vivre III, NRF, 1974; Double Interligne, 2000
  - Le Rossignol aveugle : la surprise de vivre IV, NRF, 1976
