= Celle qui vint d'ailleurs =

Celle qui vint d'ailleurs is a 1958 novel by French author Jeanne Galzy. The novel is a supernatural tale, in which the main character encounters, on a train in the south of France, an old friend of her mother's--but the woman has been dead for forty years.
