= Joy of Man's Desiring =

1936 novel by Jean Giono

- Title page for Joy of Man's Desiring (English language edition from 1940 of Que ma joie demeure)
- Author: Jean Giono
- Original title: Que ma joie demeure
- Translator: Katherine Allen Clarke
- Language: French
- Publisher: Éditions Grasset
- Publication date: 1936
- Publication place: France
- English publication date: 1940
- Pages: 493

Joy of Man's Desiring (French: Que ma joie demeure) is a 1936 novel by the French writer Jean Giono. The story takes place in an early 20th-century farmer's community in southern France, where the inhabitants suffer from a mysterious disease, while a healer tries to save them by teaching the value of joy. An English translation by Katherine Allen Clarke was published in 1940; its title was taken from Johann Sebastian Bach's chorale Jesu, Joy of Man's Desiring.

== Reception ==
Isabella W. Athey of The Saturday Review described Giono's novel as "an expression of his revolt against the effects of industrial materialism, more poetical and radical than any garden-city retreat from urban life. His territory is whole forests, whole plateaux, and this intensity perhaps explains why he is frequently described as a pagan." Athey continued: "The term seems inexact as well as inadequate, for the only pagan world with which the average reader is familiar is that of Greek and Roman cultures, and the classical values, clear even at second and third hand of organic restraint, of rationalistic emphasis on cause and effect, have no bearing upon Giono's code which is, at bottom, a refusal to compromise. This quality constitutes his originality, both as a man of beliefs and as a novelist. It leads also to some of his weaknesses, carelessness in characterization, for instance, and disregard for motivation beyond his personal intuition."
