= The Baker's Wife (film) =

- One of French theatrical release posters
- Directed by: Marcel Pagnol
- Screenplay by: Marcel Pagnol
- Based on: Blue Boy a 1932 novel by Jean Giono
- Produced by: Charles Pons
- Starring: Raimu; Ginette Leclerc; Fernand Charpin
- Cinematography: Georges Benoît
- Edited by: Suzanne de Troeye
- Music by: Vincent Scotto
- Production company: Les Films Marcel Pagnol
- Distributed by: Les Films Marcel Pagnol
- Release date: 7 September 1938
- Running time: 133 minutes
- Country: France
- Language: French

The Baker's Wife (French: La femme du boulanger) is a 1938 French comedic drama film directed by Marcel Pagnol and featuring an ensemble cast led by Raimu, Ginette Leclerc, and Fernand Charpin. It was adapted by Pagnol from an episode of French author Jean Giono's 1932 novel Blue Boy. In the film, the new baker in a Provençal village loses the will to bake after his wife runs off with a handsome shepherd, so, to regain their daily bread, the feuding villagers agree to put aside their bickering and work together to bring back the baker's wife.

The film was the basis of the American musical of the same name, which was first produced in 1976.

== Plot ==
In an idyllic village in Provence, the locals spend most of their time bickering and feuding, but they are all brought together to try the bread at the new bakery in town. The town's previous baker was a drunk who made goods of variable quality, so the villagers are relieved to find that the new baker, Aimable Castanier, seems to be a sober man who is good at his job.

The night after the bakery's first day of business, Aurélie, Aimable's pretty and much younger wife, runs off with Dominique, a handsome young shepherd who works for the local marquis. When Aimable finds her gone in the morning, he is devastated, and word of her disappearance soon spreads through the whole village. Aimable initially tries to convince himself and others that Aurélie must have suddenly gone to visit her mother, but no one is fooled, as several people saw her leave with Dominique, and their efforts at consoling Aimable misfire. After hearing the young priest mention his plight during the sermon at Sunday mass, Aimable heads to a bar, where he gets drunk on pastis and makes a public scene, during which he declares that he cannot bring himself to bake now that his wife is gone.

The marquis enlists the schoolteacher to come up with a plan to search for Aurélie and calls a town meeting. So that they do not lose their bread, everyone agrees to help, even if it means searching with people with whom they are feuding. Aimable's spirits are lifted by the support, but his optimism begins to flag after several of the patrols return without any news of Aurélie. Giving up hope, he attempts to hang himself in his basement, but some drunken, happy villagers who have ended their feuds during the search find him.

Just then, word comes that Aurélie has been sighted on an island in a marsh—with Dominique, singing and naked—by an elderly villager named Maillefer while he was fishing. Aimable asks the priest to go talk Aurélie into coming back to him, and the marquis suggests the schoolteacher, who has ongoing philosophical and theological debates with the priest, carry the priest on his back through the marsh to the island.

When he sees the priest coming, Dominique swims off in the other direction. The priest lectures Aurélie, reading her the story of Jesus and the woman taken in adultery while they wait for the schoolteacher to arrange for everyone in the village to go inside after dark so Aurélie can sneak back to the bakery unseen. Aimable neatens up the bakery and makes dinner, and when a penitent Aurélie returns and asks for forgiveness, he acts as though he still thinks she just went to visit her mother. However, when Pomponette, their female cat who has been gone for several days, returns, he hurls insults at her for running out on their male cat, Pompon, though he is obviously really talking to Aurélie. Continuing to use the cats as proxies, Aimable describes how much he cares for Aurélie, and she says she will never leave him again. Together, the reunited couple relights the bakery's oven.

== Cast ==
- Raimu as Aimable Castanier, the baker
- Ginette Leclerc as Aurélie Castanier, the baker's wife, Dominique’s lover
- Fernand Charpin as Marquis Castan de Venelles
- Charles Moulin as Dominique, a shepherd, Aurélie’s lover
- Édouard Delmont as Maillefer
- Robert Vattier as the priest
- Charles Blavette as Antonin
- Robert Bassac as the schoolteacher
- Marcel Maupi as Barnabé
- Alida Rouffe as Céleste, the priest's maid
- Odette Roger as Miette, Antonin's wife
- Yvette Fournier as Hermine
- Maximilienne as Mademoiselle Angèle, a spinster
- Charblay as Arsène, the butcher
- Julien Maffre as Pétugue
- Adrien Legros as Barthélemy
- Jean Castan as Esprit, another shepherd
- Gustave Merle as Le Papet, an elderly villager
- Paul Dullac as Casimir, the tobacconist who runs the Circle

== Awards ==
- National Board of Review Awards (1940) – Best Foreign Film & Best Acting (for Raimu)
- New York Film Critics Circle Awards (1940) – Best Foreign Film

== Restoration ==
Marcel Pagnol's grandson Nicolas and cinematographer Guillaume Schiffman supervised a 4K restoration of the film from the 35mm nitrate original camera negative conducted by the company Hiventy. The restored film has been released on Region B Blu-ray, and The Criterion Collection released the film on DVD and Blu-ray in 2019.
