= The Man Who Planted Trees =

Short story by Jean Giono

- French cover for the pop-up version of the book
- Author: Jean Giono
- Original title: L'homme qui plantait des arbres
- Genre: Fiction
- Publication date: 1953

The Man Who Planted Trees (French title: L'homme qui plantait des arbres) is an allegorical tale by French author Jean Giono, published in 1953. It tells the story of one shepherd's long and successful singlehanded effort to re-forest a desolate valley in the foothills of the Alps, near Provence, throughout the first half of the 20th century. It was written in French, and first published in English. The story has become known worldwide and is seen as an inspiration for ecological regeneration brought about by man. In 1988, Frédéric Back won an Academy Award for the animated short film The Man Who Planted Trees.

== Plot ==
The story begins in the year 1913, when a young man who is the narrator is travelling alone on a hiking trip through Provence, France, and into the Alps, enjoying the relatively unspoiled wilderness. He runs out of water in a treeless, desolate valley where only wild lavender grows and there is no trace of civilization except old, empty crumbling buildings. He finds only a dried-up well, but is saved by a middle-aged shepherd who takes him to a spring he knows of.

Curious about this man and why he has chosen such a lonely life, the narrator stays with him for a time. The shepherd, Elzéard Bouffier, after being widowed, decided to restore the ruined landscape of the isolated and largely abandoned valley by single-handedly cultivating a forest, by planting acorns. He makes holes in the ground with his straight iron staff and drops into them acorns that he collected from miles away. He is also growing beech and birch saplings for planting.

The narrator leaves the shepherd, returns home, and later fights in the First World War. In 1920, shell-shocked and depressed after the war, the man returns. He is surprised to see young saplings of all forms taking root in the valley, and new streams running through it, where the trees are changing the climate. The narrator makes a full recovery in the peace and beauty of the regrowing valley, and continues to visit the region and M. Bouffier every year. He finds on one visit that Bouffier is no longer a shepherd, because of the sheep eating his young trees, and has become a beekeeper instead.

The valley receives official protection after the First World War, with the French authorities mistakenly believing that the rapid growth of the new forest is a bizarre natural phenomenon, as they are unaware of Bouffier's selfless deeds. Over three decades, Bouffier continues to plant trees, and the valley is turned into a kind of Garden of Eden. By the end of the story, the valley is vibrant with life and is peacefully settled, with more than 10,000 people living there, not knowing they owe their happiness to Bouffier. The narrator tells one of his friends, a government forester, the truth about the new forest, and the friend also helps to protect it.

In 1945, the narrator visits the now very old Bouffier one last time. In 1947, in a hospice in Banon, the man who planted trees peacefully passes away.

== Background ==
Many readers believed that Elzéard Bouffier was a genuine historical figure and that the narrator of the story was a young Jean Giono himself, and that the tale is part autobiographical. Giono did live during this time, and while he was alive Giono enjoyed allowing people to believe that the story was real, and considered it as a tribute to his skill. His daughter, Aline Giono, described it as "a family story for a long time", but Jean Giono himself explained in a 1957 letter to an official of the city of Digne:

Sorry to disappoint you, but Elzéard Bouffier is a fictional person. The goal was to make trees likeable, or more specifically, make planting trees likeable.

In the letter, he describes how the book was translated in a multitude of languages, distributed freely, and therefore was a success. He adds that, although "it does not bring me a cent", it is one of the texts of which he is most proud.

== Adaptations ==
- The novel was adapted as the animated short film The Man Who Planted Trees, directed by Frédéric Back and released in 1987. It earned a number of awards including an Academy Award for Best Animated Short Film. The film was published in two versions, French and English, and narrated respectively by actors Philippe Noiret and Christopher Plummer.
- The story was the basis for the 2025 comic book L'Homme qui plantait des arbres written by Florence Lebonvallet and drawn by Daniel Casanave.

== Spoken-word recordings ==
In 1985 the Paul Winter Consort recorded an album with Robert J. Lurtsema as the narrator. It was made into a book-on-tape in 1990 by Earth Music Productions. In 1992, the American radio show Hearts of Space did a musically accompanied reading (episode 290, first aired on 15 May) with narration by Robert J. Lurtsema. It has also been recorded for BBC Radio 4 with Bill Paterson narrating.

Gallimard Jeunesse produced a French version in 2010 of 'L'homme qui plantait des arbres', read by Jacques Bonnaffé. Lara López narrated the Spanish version.

== See also ==
- Green Mountain
- Ferdinand Larose
- Johnny Appleseed
- Jadav Payeng
- Willie Smits
- Akira Miyawaki
- Creekfinding
