= Benigembla =

- Municipality
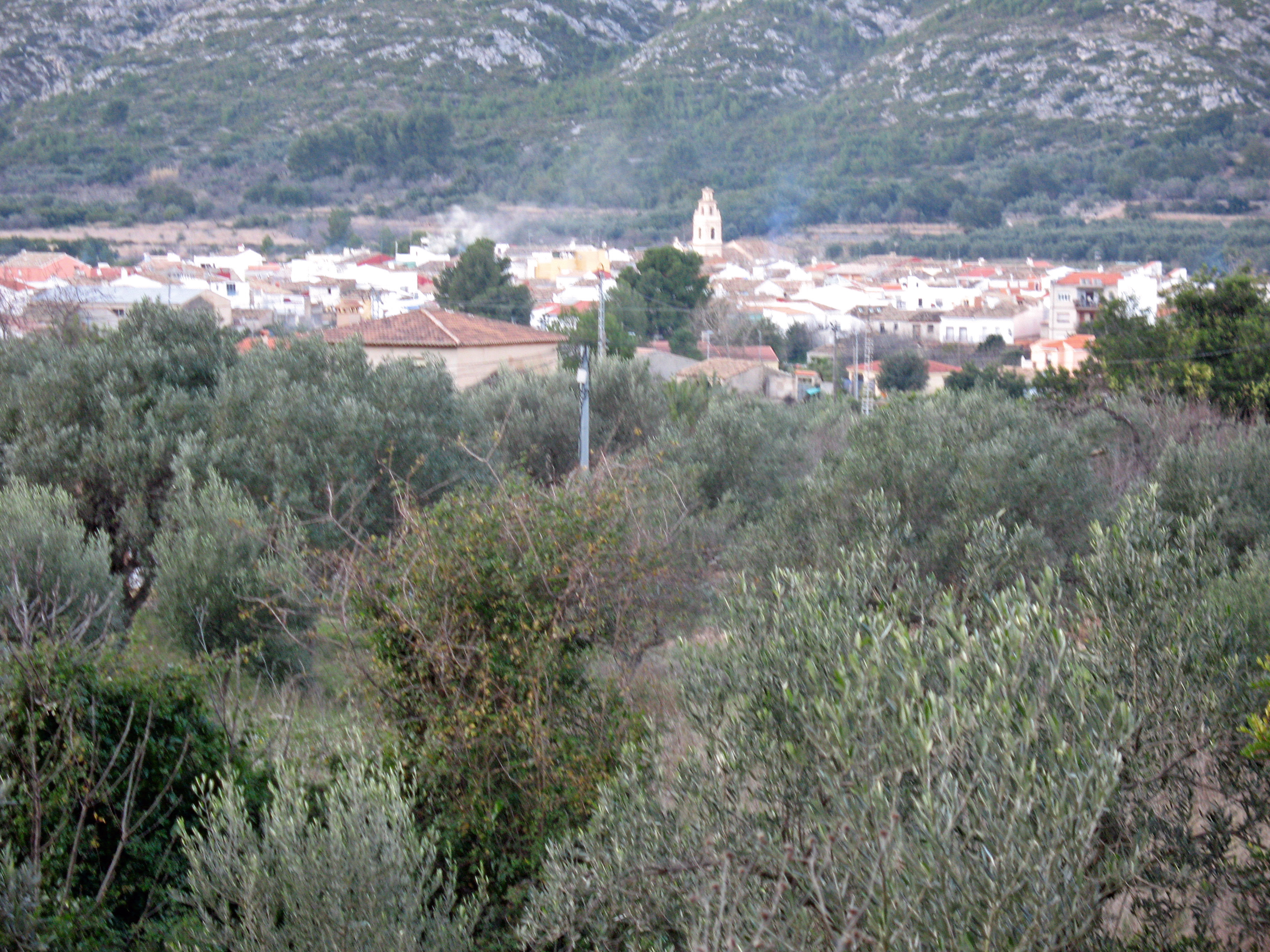
- The town of Benigembla

- Coat of arms

- Location in Spain
- Coordinates: 38°45′21″N 0°6′37″W
- Country: Spain
- Autonomous community: Valencian Community
- Province: Alicante
- Comarca: Marina Alta (comarca)
- Judicial district: Dénia

Government
  - Alcalde: Joan Caselles i Mengual (BLOC)

Area
  - Total: 18.40 km^{2} (7.10 sq mi)
- Elevation: 314 m (1,030 ft)

Population (2025-01-01)
  - Total: 590
  - Density: 32/km^{2} (83/sq mi)
- Demonym(s): Benigembler, benigemblera
- Time zone: UTC+1 (CET)
  - Summer (DST): UTC+2 (CEST)
- Postal code: 03794
- Official language(s): Valencian

Benigembla (Valencian pronunciation: [beniˈdʒembla]) is a town and municipality in the Pop Valley within the district of Marina Alta in eastern Spain. The town is 314 m above sea level. It is only 50 km away from Benidorm, 88 km from Alicante, 105 km from Valencia, and 23 km from Dénia. Just 7.5 km (about 5 miles) from the town, in the direction of La Vall d'Ebo in an ancient Morisco site, Pla de Petracos, there are paintings over 8000 years old and UNESCO has designated it a protected world site of cultural interest. The town of Benigembla is also of Moorish origin, like most towns in the Pop Valley. In 1609 more than 14,000 Moors of the Pop Valley that resisted the decree of expulsion, and they gathered in the mountain of El Cavall Verd or el Pop. At the end, the Moors gave up because they were running out of food, water, and basic supplies. After giving up, most of the Moors were expelled after suffering high casualties.

After the decree of expulsion of the Moors from the year 1609, the village was repopulated mostly by Majorcan and western Catalan people. The village still retains many traditions and customs of these settlers, and also the language spoken by the villagers. At the summit of "El Cavall Verd" also known as "La Muntanya del Pop", there are still some remains of an ancient castle called ´´El Castell de Pop´´. ´´El Castell de Pop´´ was owned by Al-Azraq, then by Pere d'Altafulla. Since 1329 was owned by Vidal de Vilanova and his successors. During the final period it was handed to ´´Jaume I el conqueridor´´ by the Jovada pact by Al-Azraq. Later, Peter the Great ordered its destruction, and today there are very few traces left. ´´El Castell de Pop´´gives its name to this enchanted valley in the Marina Alta.

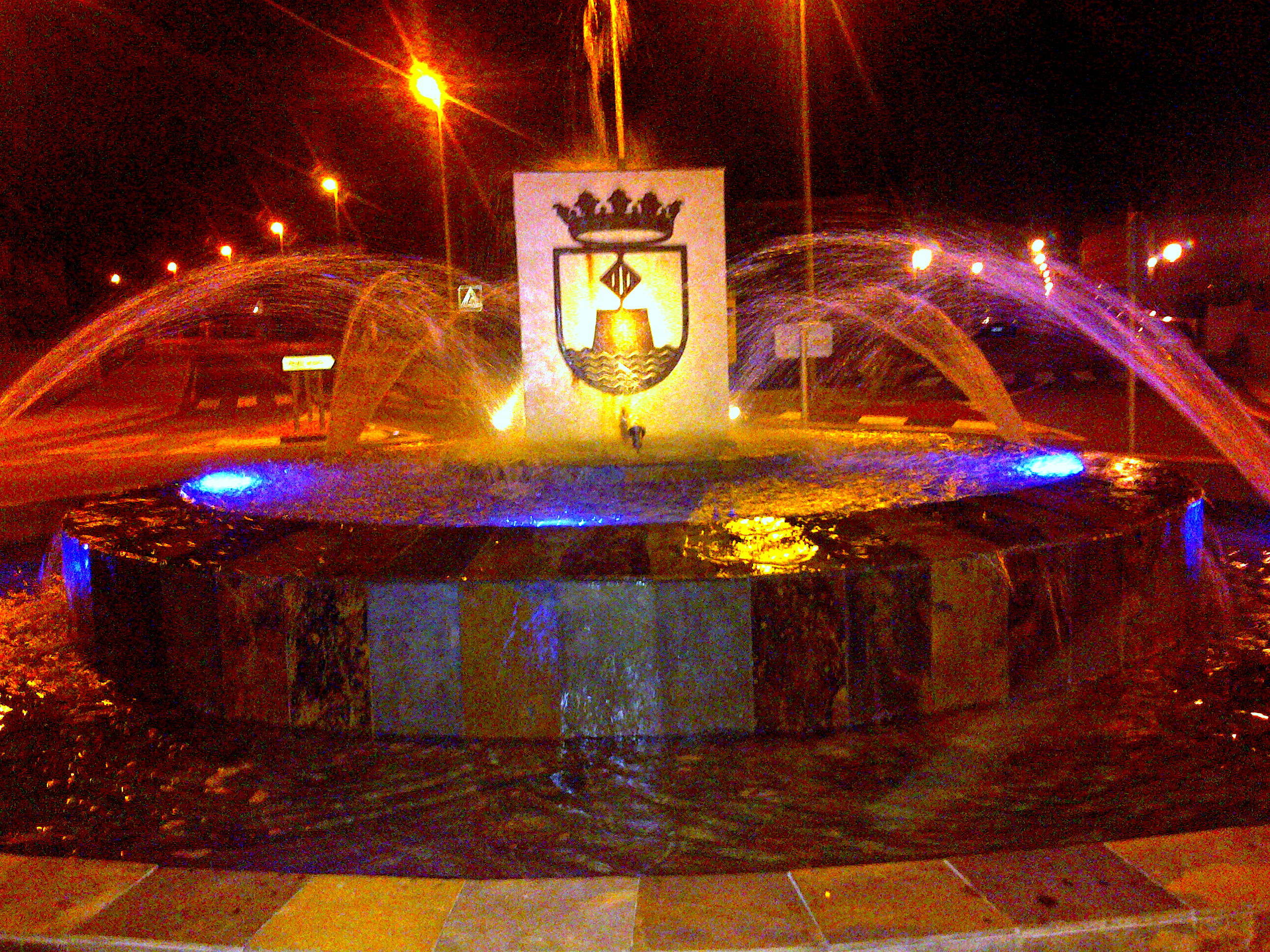
The coat of arms of Benigembla

== Demography ==
In 1615 the town had a population of only 99 inhabitants, and it reached its peak in 1860 with almost 900 inhabitants. From the 1900s to 1960 the town lost 34% of its population, since most of the locals migrated to the U.S., France, Germany, and Algeria Today the village has approximately 606 inhabitants, according to the latest municipal census of the year 2011. About 45% percent of the population is foreign, mostly British, these newcomers which started to settle in the 1980s and in the year 2009 they already represented 36% of the population. But there are also Germans and North Americans in town. The district of Vernissa Park is largely English speaking, since most of the people that settled in the urbanisation are British.

In 1998 there were 382 inhabitants in Benigembla, and in the census of the year 2006 the population reached 563 inhabitants, and in 2022 there are 512 inhabitants. Today there is 52% of the population according to the 2022 census that is foreign, of which about 67.5% are from the United Kingdom of Great Britain, while the rest come from North America, France, Germany, Belgium, Netherlands, and Eastern Europe.

It is a very flat town surrounded by mountains, which one can find very enjoyable and relaxing. The main language spoken by its local inhabitants is the Catalan language, also known locally as Valencian, which the majority of the population speak and use as their main language. After the decree of the expelling of the Moors in 1609, the town was populated mostly by inhabitants from Catalonia, and the Balearic Islands. Most of the traditions of these settlers are still carried out today, together with the Catalan language that they brought with them. In the table below we can see the different changes in Benigembla's population from the year 1857 to 2007, according to the National Institute of Statistics(1). The population has been increasing since 1998, since more of the newcomers started to register in the municipal town's census. Today the population of Benigembla is the most diverse population that has been since the existence of the town.

Changes in the population of Benigembla
Year	1857	1887	1900	1910	1920	1930	1940	1950	1960	1970	1981	1991	2000	2006	2007	2009	2011	2022
Population	809	879	758	667	649	730	693	689	564	549	420	380	392	563	570	589	606	512

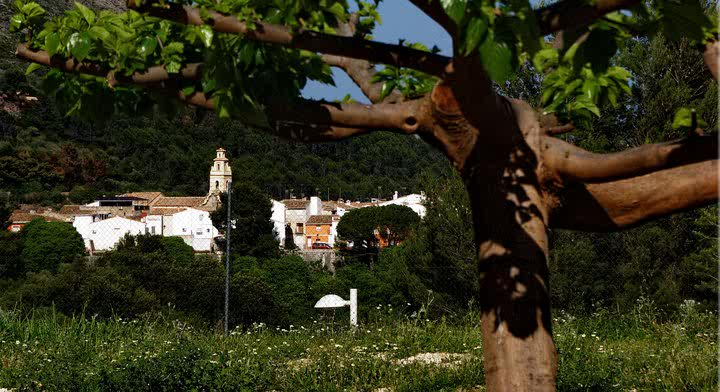
Benigembla

== Major festivities and traditions ==
There are two major festivities during the year. In the 3rd week of January, the town celebrates its winter festivities in honour of Sant Honorat and Sant Antoni with its fayre, and the blessing of house pets and other animals, and other activities. During the summer in August, the town celebrates its major festivity from 12 to 17 August. During the summer festivity there are concerts, theatre, fireruns (correfoc), dancing, Valencian handball, running with the bulls, and religious celebrations. In autumn, there is usually a craft fair on the last weekend of October (darrer diumenge d'octubre).

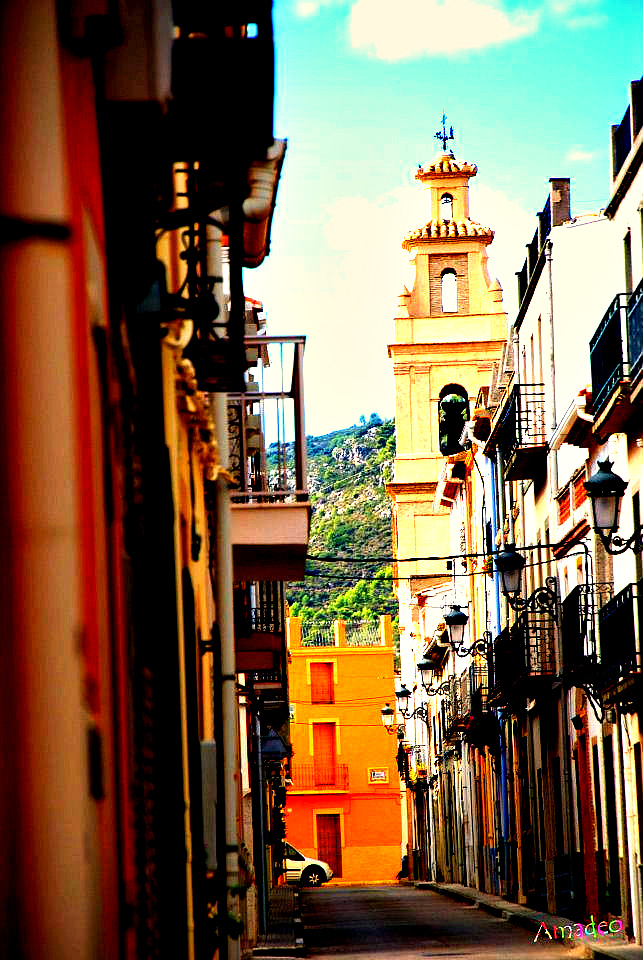
Carrer Llarg in Benigembla

== Environment ==
The town of Benigembla

Nestled in the Valley of Pop, on the River Gorgos at the foot of the mountains of El Cavall Verd, its relief is very wary and holds places worth visiting force throughout the municipal area of 18.4 km^{2}, as the climb of "El Cocoll" or to "El Cavall Verd", a mountain that looks like the face of a woman, the recreational area of the "Safareig", and the camping area of "la Vall de Pop" just 750 m from the town.

The town is known from around the area for its many trails, and spectacular mountain views. The highest mountain peak of Benigembla is represented by "El Morro d'en Serra" with 1,001 m. One of the walking trails of interest in town is The Route of "El Mirabó". Other known mountains of Benigembla are: "El Cavall Verd" or "el Pop"(793 m), "La Penya de l'Altar" (949 m), "La Solana" (793 m), and also "El Mirabó" (691 m).

An interesting hiking trail is the climb to the top of "Cocoll"(1045 m), and it is a marked trail that starts in the Camí del Corral Nou, which is about 350 m from the town of Benigembla towards the road to Castell de Castells. We pass by over the well of el "l' Aljub del Frare" and by the cliff "Barrancs dels Bous"". A zigzag draw us closer to "El Corral de Malea", and then to a more open space called la "Corona". Then we arrived at the "Pla d'en Moragues" where there are planes and helicopters of the forest services. we followed then a forest track that leads to the top of Cocoll, which is very close. The views when the weather permits it, are magnificent and we can see clearly: El Cavall Verd, Carrascal d'Ebo, Alfaro, the Pla de Petracos, Serrella, Xortà, Aitana, Carrascal de Parcent.

There is a rare colony of the plant Caralluma mumbyana in the mountain of the Cavall Verd, a type of cactus with bright pink flowers that is indigenous to south-eastern Spain, that is at risk of extinction. There are only three other known colonies of the plant in the Valencian Country, and it is currently under the protection of the International Union for the Conservation of Nature (IUCN). The river Xaló-Gorgos passes next to Benigembla, which borders the town from its west side to its east side, and it was designated, as a site of special community interest by the European Commission in 2005. The river Xaló-Gorgos is 55 km long, and it ends finally in the sea in Xàbia.

== Economy and tourism ==
Farming and livestock were the pillars of the economy until the 1970s, but today most of the people work in the services sector, and farming is considered a complementary activity that is done basically on weekends and holidays. Still the farmers of Benigembla make wine, olive oil, and they produce almonds, figs, olives, and grapes among others.

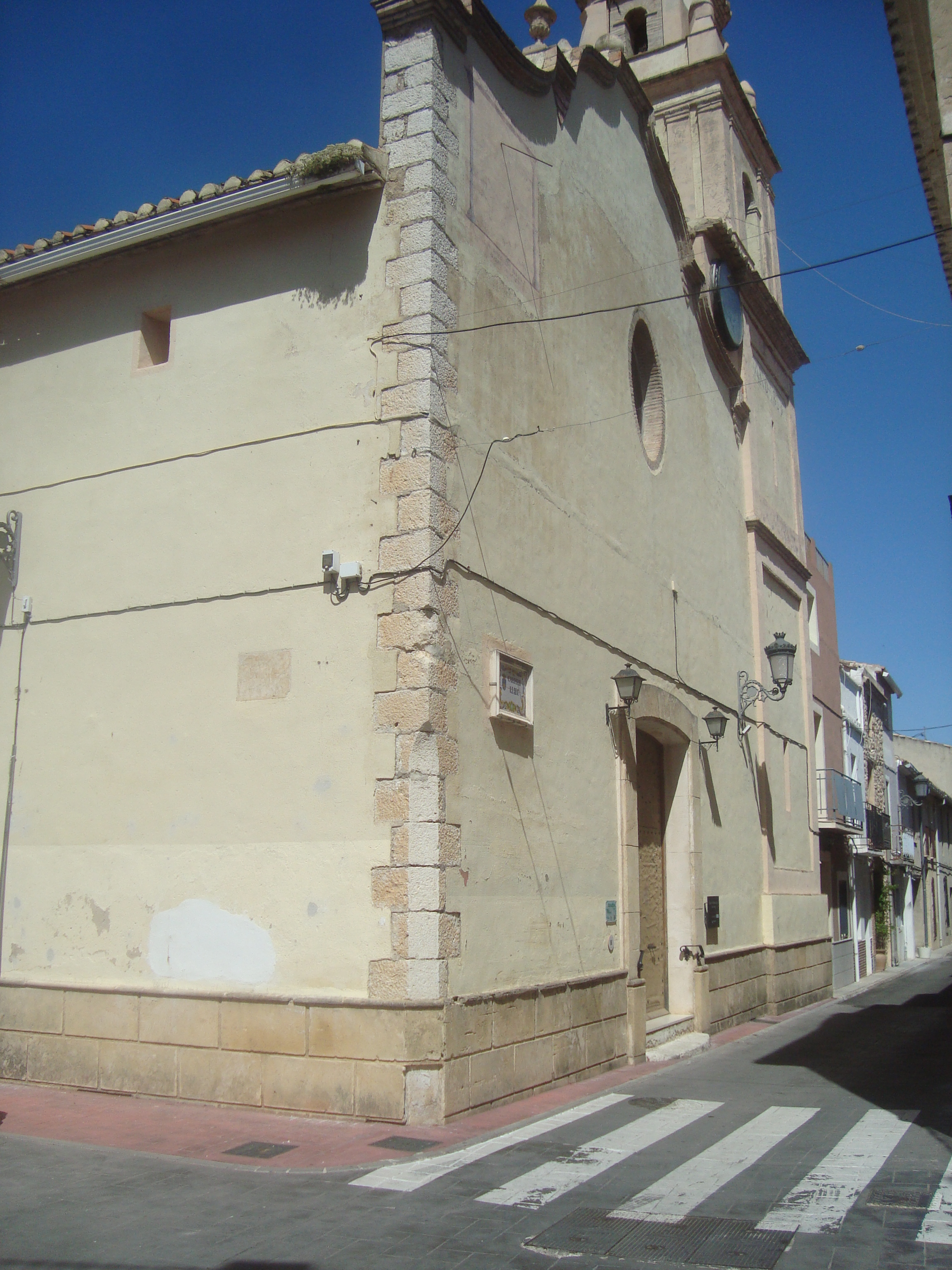
The Church of Saint Joseph(Benigembla).

The town also has two restaurants, two rural houses, a recreational area in The Safareig, and a camping area. The camping area is located just 1 km from Benigembla, on the road that leads to Castell de Castells. There is a swimming pool, a tennis court, and other facilities. Another site of interest of Benigembla is The Ribàs Botanical Garden next to the main square, with trees that are more than 100 years old, and other species of special botanical interest. The Ribàs Botanical Park went through a major renovation project, and 408 new vegetal species were planted

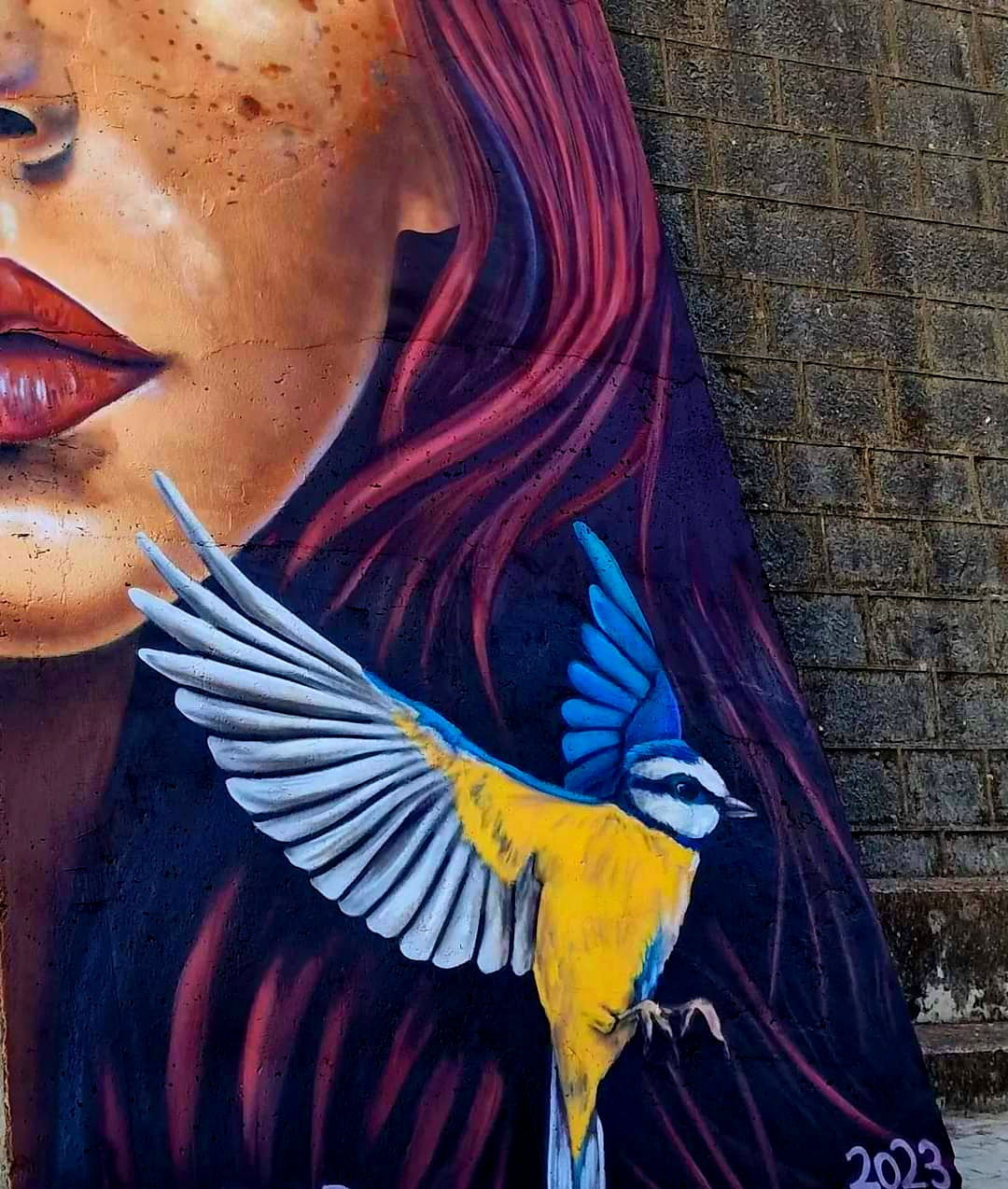
The Living Museum of Benigembla

In the Living Museum of Benigembla, art comes to life in its streets. Benigembla is also known for its graffiti, or Street Art. Every year in the late spring, or at the beginning of summer, a festival is organized in which graffiti artists from all over the world participate. Among the participants is Tardor Graffiti of the Xara, the Mexican Juan Andrés Vera, or Xolaka among many other renowned international street artists.

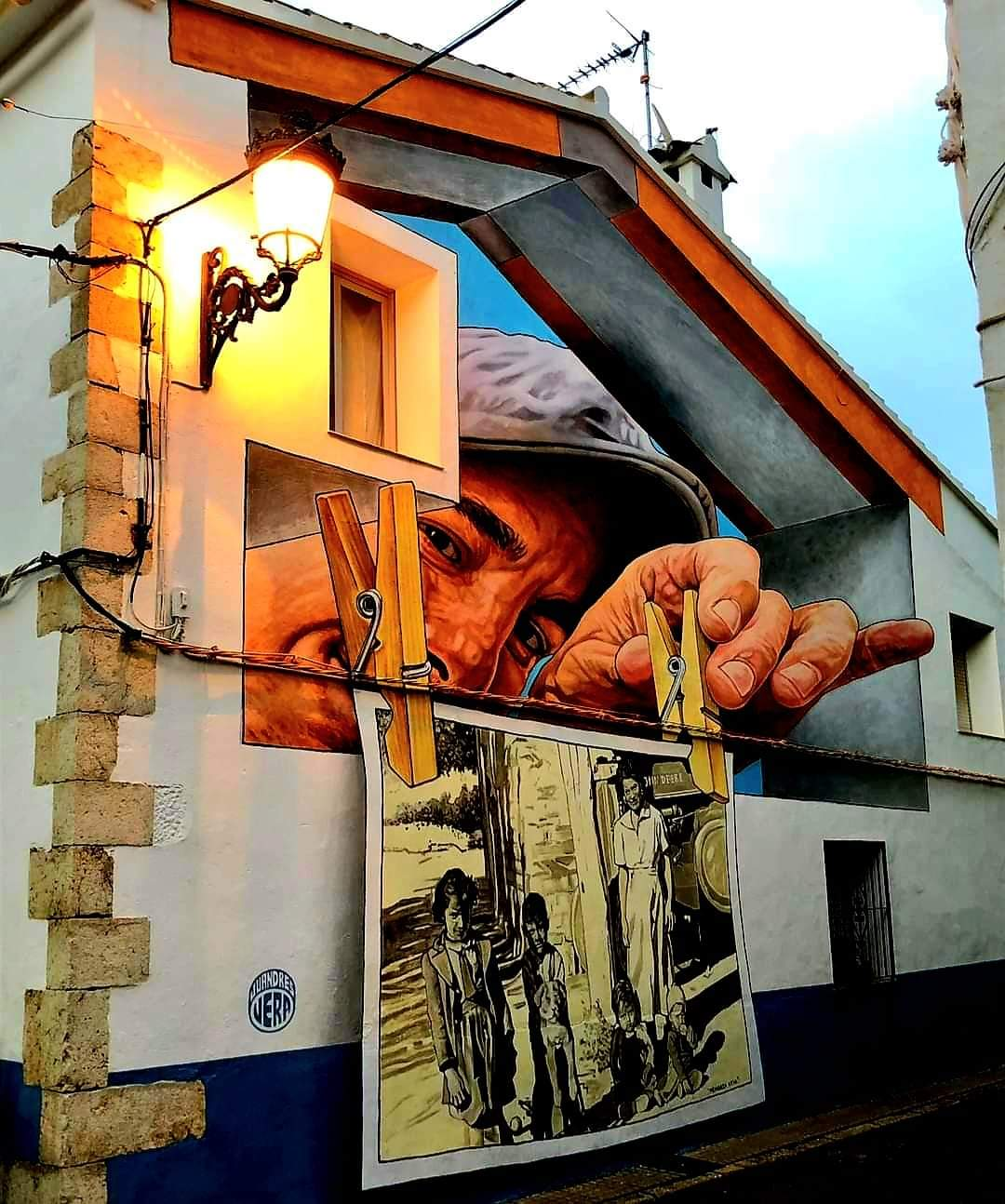
The Living Museum of Benigembla

The festival has been held in Benigembla since 2018, with artworks displayed on building façades throughout the town.

Some of the exteriors of the film "Her Majesty the Minor" were filmed in the fields of Benigembla, in October 2006, a super European production of the French director Jean-Jacques Annaud, who also directed The films "Seven Years in Tibet" and "The Name of the Rose".

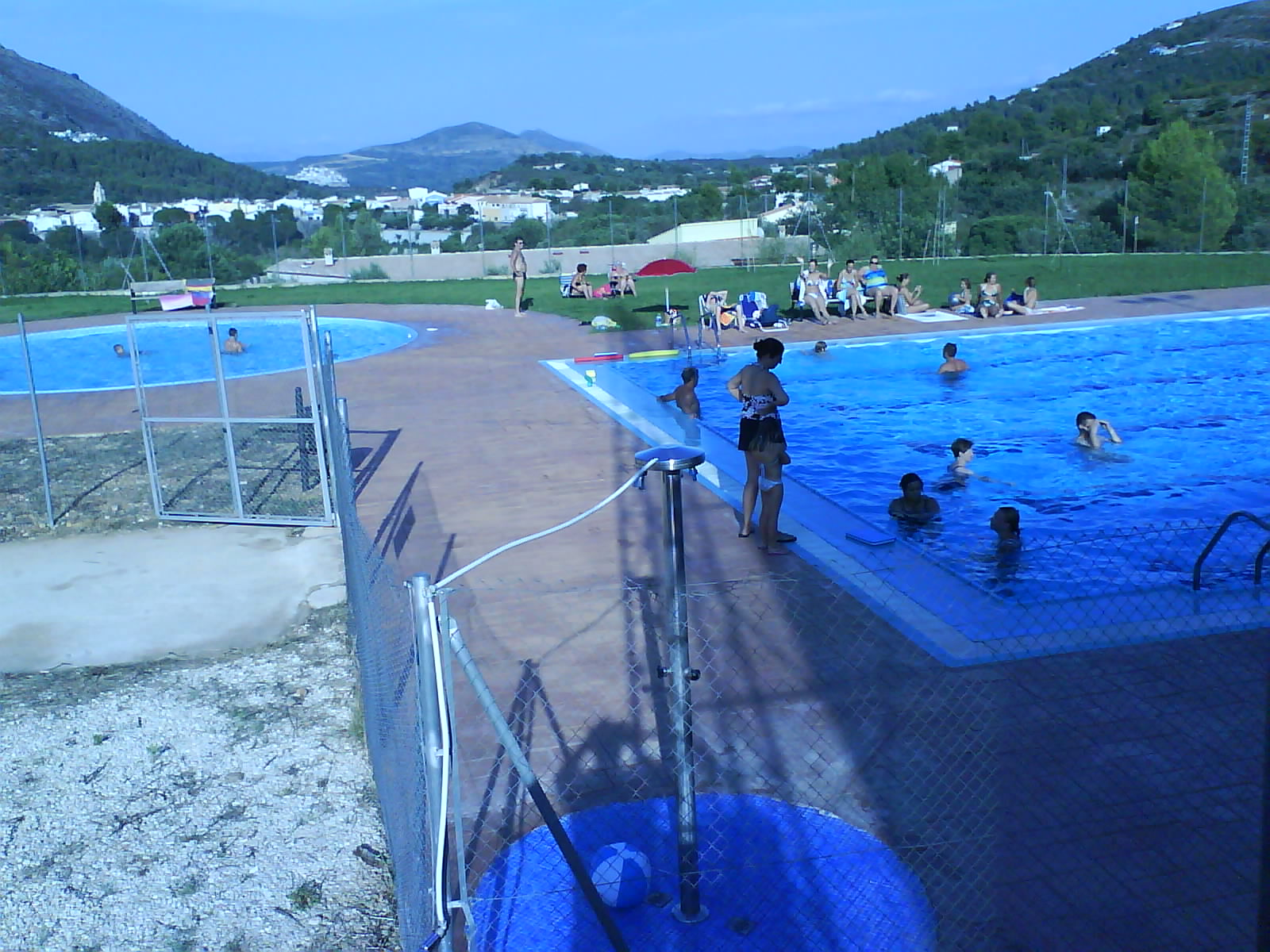
The municipal swimming pool in Benigembla

== Architectural heritage ==
- 'The Parish Church of "Saint Josep"", of neoclassical style. Eighteenth century building with a baroque bell tower.
- "El Safareig", and its recreational area with a barbecue site. It used to be the public town laundromat.

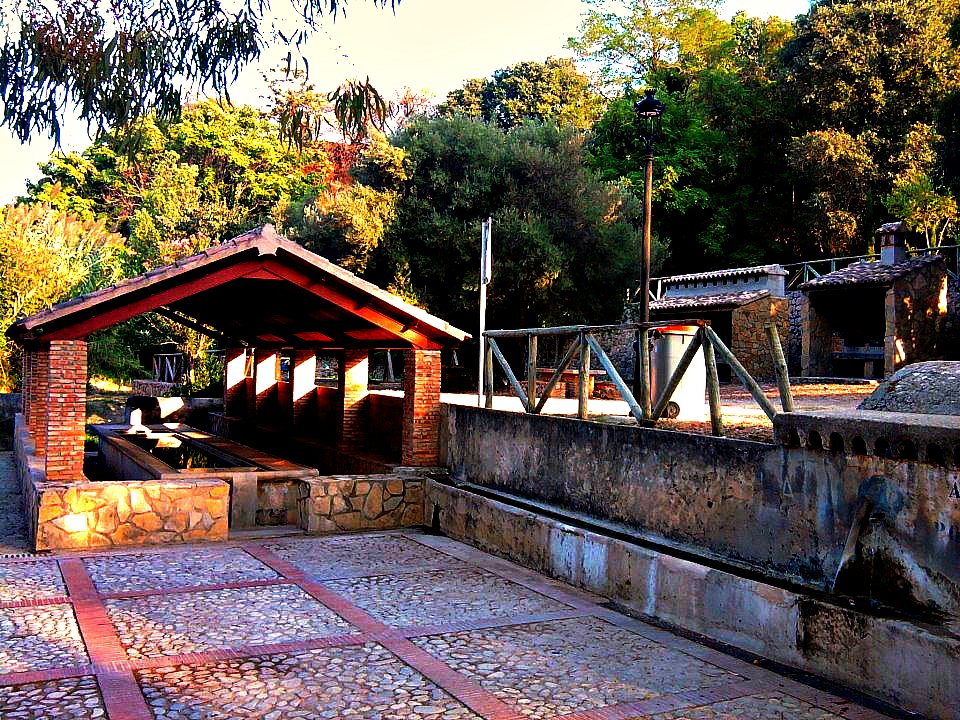
El Safareig of Benigembla

- The building "El Sindicat", with neoclassic elements of the French baroque and rococo style.
- The Bridges on the road to Parcent and Murla, built by stonemasons.
- "El Ribàs", the walls bordering part of the western part of the town and protecting it from flood waters of the river "Xaló-Gorgos" were also built by stonemasons.
- The Parish Church of "Sant Josep" was restored and decorated in 1994, and the great bell named Maria la Gran was repaired in the same year (Hermanos Portilla 1994). Another bell is the bell known as the bell from Vernissa, which is the small one named Santa Barbera (Domingo Tormo 1808), and finally the middle one which is named Maria Bàrbara (Dominic Tormo 1868).
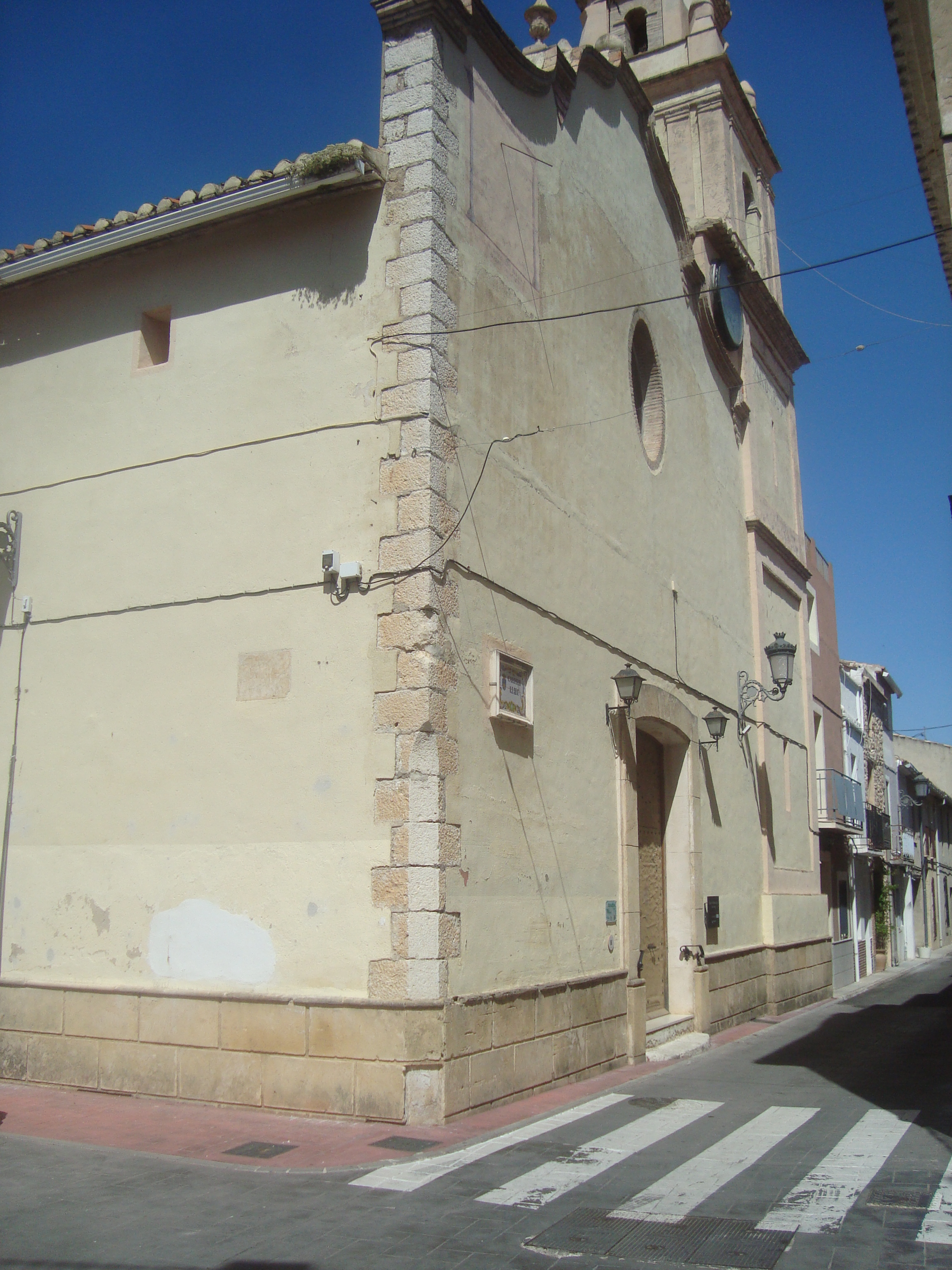
  The Church of Saint Joseph(Benigembla).
- "Els Riuraus" A Riurau, typical construction of Benigembla where the grapes where preserved to dry when raining.
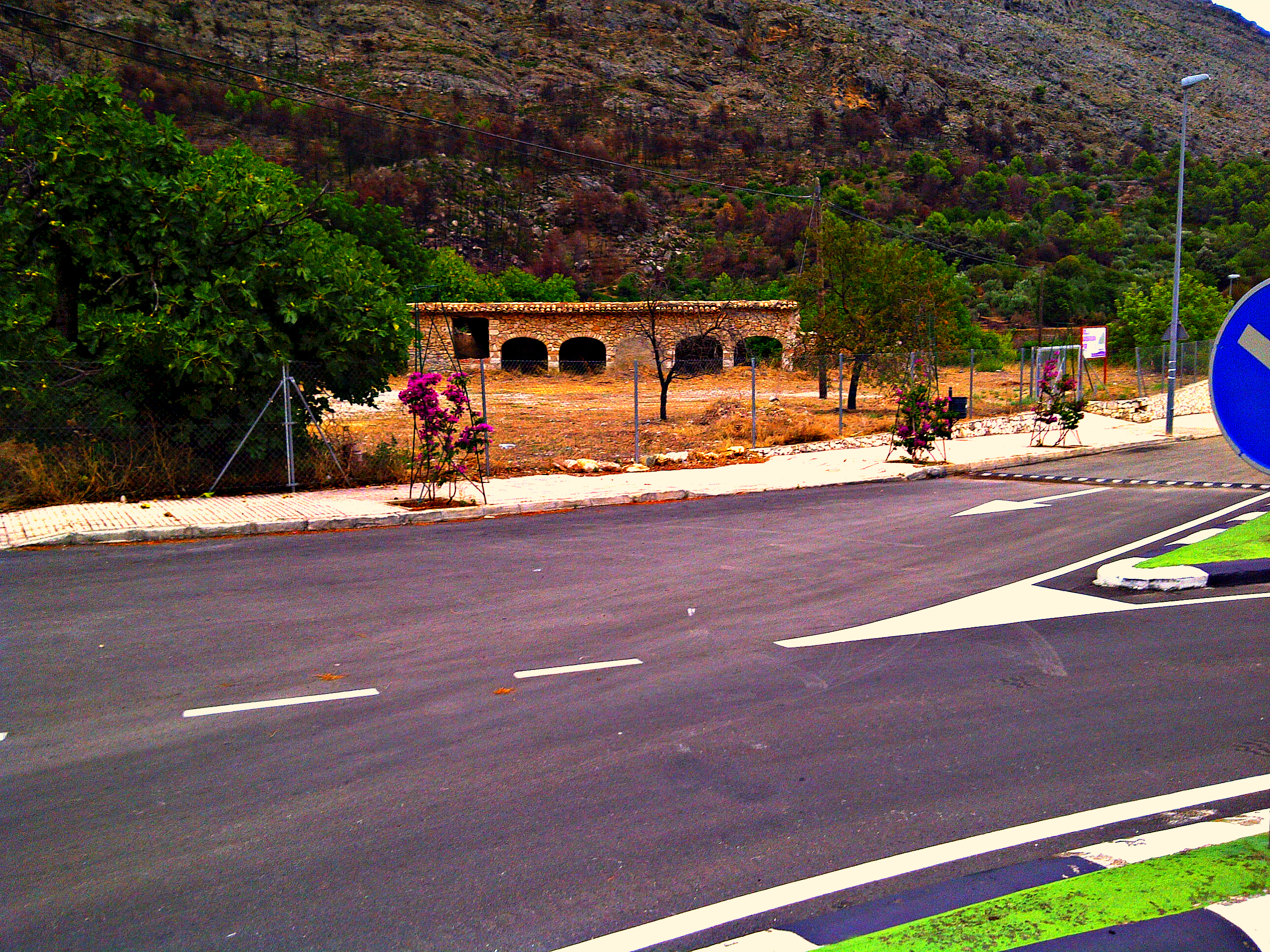
  A Riurau, typical construction of Benigembla where the grapes where preserved to dry when raining
- "El Sindicat", located at the corner of "El Carrer Llarg" and "El Carrer Sant Francesc Xavier", which was always the social club of the town, and it is a building from the early twentieth century, specifically it was built in 1925 by the local architect Adelí Moll. The club belonged to members of the Cooperative Saint Francis Xavier, but the Town Council purchased the site in 2005 with the objective of rehabilitating its interior and restoring its facade. This building is of neoclassical style with elements of the rococo, and French baroque, which it may be due to the influence of returning benigemblers from the emigration from Algeria. In February 2010, the Town Council started the rehabilitation of the building with a budget of around 500,000 euros. The new "Sindicat" now has three floors, so this new building has more capacity and can better address the social and cultural needs of the whole town. The building is suitable for carrying on the one hand, exhibitions, conferences, seminars or classes for seniors, among other activities, and moreover, within the premises also can be conducted recreational dancing or physical fitness, etc.
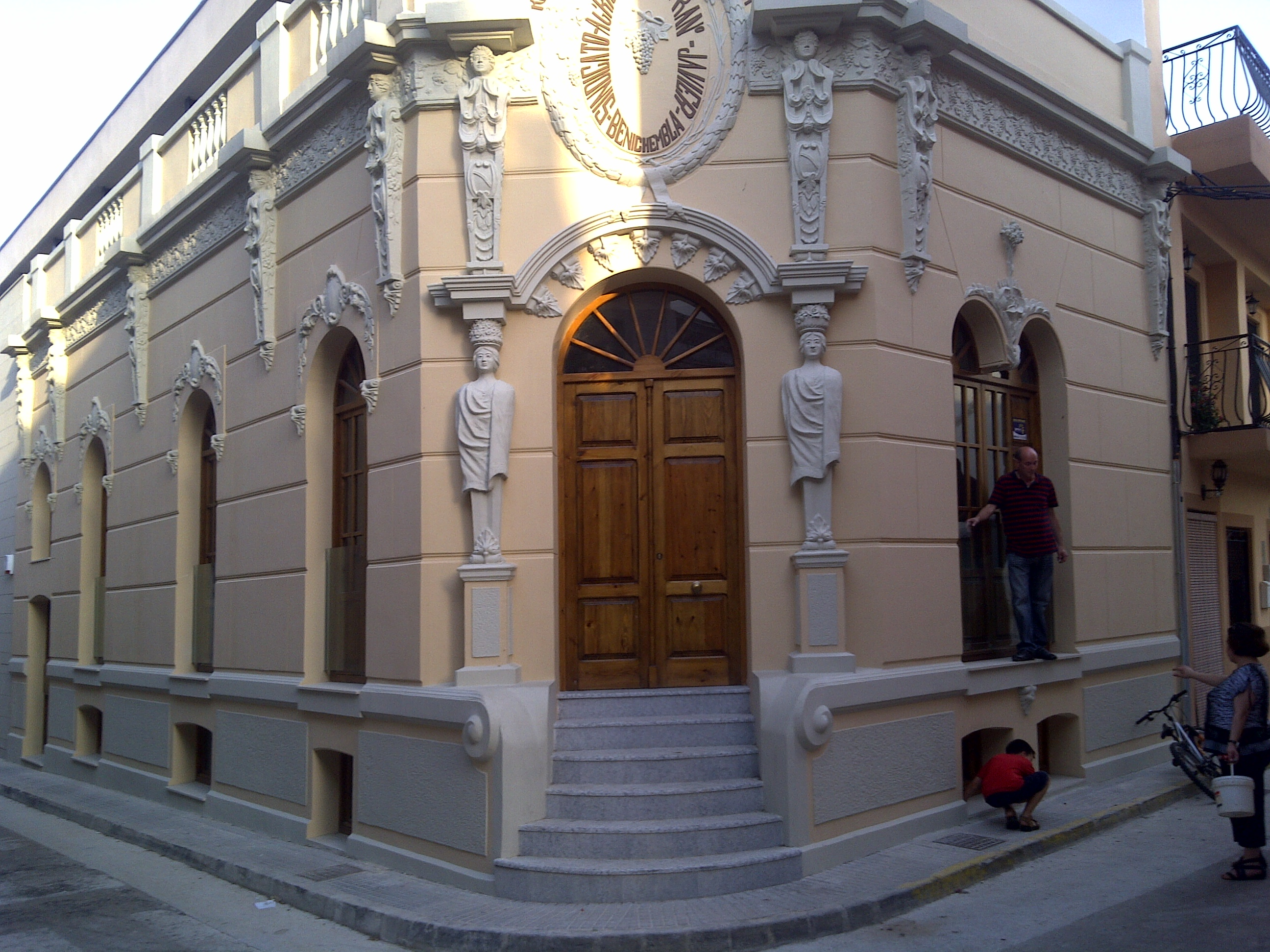
  Social Centre el Sindicat of Benigembla
- Also noteworthy are "the walls of the Ribàs", which protects the w0estern side of town from the flood waters built by stonemasons at least more than 115 years ago.Following the flood of 1890, which was one of the most severe, these walls, made by stonemasons, were completed at the beginning of the 20th century. The town owes Mr. Baldomero Vega de Seoane, the deputy that was able to come up with the money and project for the construction of these retaining walls. Mr. Baldomero Vega de Seoane was a deputy in the Provincial Council of Alicante/Alacant of the liberal party of Canalejas. Currently the main square of the town bears his name in this place you will also find he Ribàs Botanical Park, a park that was recently renovated in 2022. There are trees over 100 years old, and other species of special botanical interest. It is a Botanical Park that is a reference park of Mediterranean biodiversity for the entire interior of the Marina Alta region. It is located in a place of great ecological and environmental interest next to the Gorgos river. It should also be mentioned that this area is an LIC.

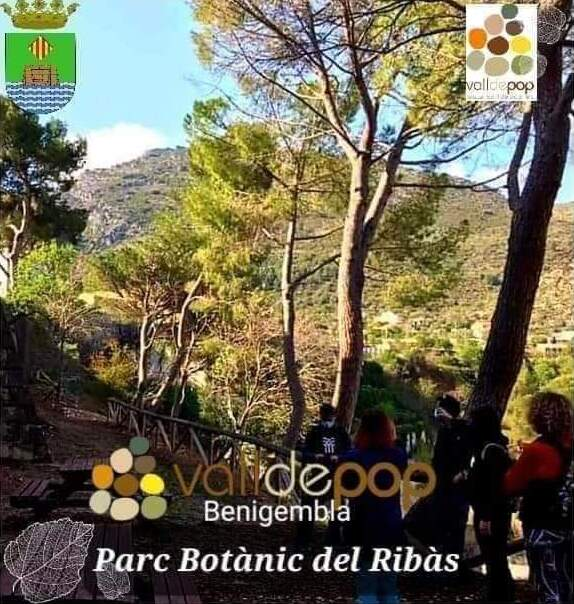
The Botanical Park of the Ribàs

== Politics ==
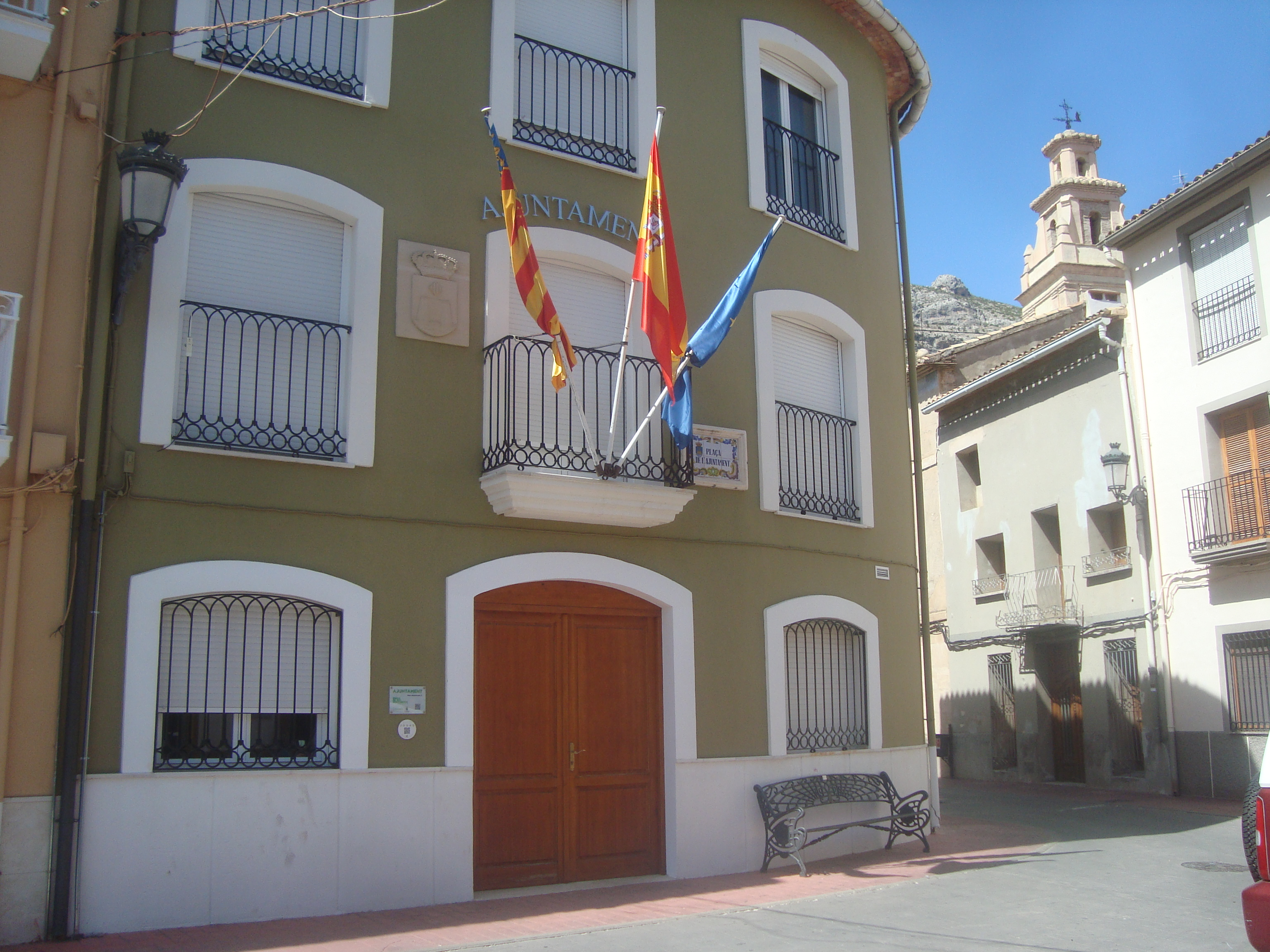
In the municipal elections of May 2011 the nationalist valencian party Bloc Nacionalista Valencià-Compromís won three seats in the town council with 36 percent of the votes, the socialist valencian party PSPV-PSOE won two seats with 33 percent of the votes, and the conservative party PPCV two seats with 29 percent of the votes. The candidate for the BLOC party Joan Caselles i Mengual is elected mayor with the support of the other 2 councilmen of his own party. In the municipal elections of 2007 the People's Party PPCV won three seats in the town council with 38% of the votes, the Valencian Socialist Workers' Party (PSPV-PSOE) two seats with 27% of the votes, and the nationalist Valencian party denominated Bloc Nacionalista Valencià-Compromís one seat with 20% of the votes, and another local party also obtained one seat with 14% of the votes. In 2007. Fernando Mengual i Taverner of the PPCV was elected mayor with three votes out of the seven councilmen, however his inability to work with other councilmen, the lack of democratic transparency in the decision-making process, together with the lack of support of his own party, and after three major defeats to his controversial plans to build three more urbanisations, which started to provoke distrust and discontent. As a result, on 23 August 2008, a vote of no confidence was presented by the three opposition parties, which resulted in voting and proclaiming the councilman of the Bloc party, Joan Caselles i Mengual as mayor of Benigembla, with the support of the two socialist seats and the other seat from the other local party.

In the municipal elections of 2003 the PP obtained four seats, and the PSPV-PSOE three seats, but they were all pressured to resign from their seats, except one councillor, after the town council has signed in November 2004 a secret controversial plan with a known major developer, to build a massive urbanisation with 1500 new houses, and a golf course. The contract that was signed secretly would have been unsustainable for the municipal services of this town, and would have given the developer all the decision making regarding the future urban development of the town. In 2005, the major Aurelio Llinares i Mas of the PP party resigned, and Felipe Perez i Mengual took over as mayor until 2007. The plan to build 1500 houses and a golf course finally was revoked on a town council meeting on 21 May 2010 by the nationalist mayor of the Bloc party Joan Caselles, and the developer "El Grup Ballester".

The first mayor that was elected after the Franco's regime was the socialist Antoni Caselles i Pérez, then the independent Francesc Mas i Sendra for two terms, the socialist Francesc Taverner i Taverner for two terms, and the socialist Rogelio Sendra i Taverner for one term, the conservative Aurelio Llinares i Mas for 1 term, Fernando Mengual i Taverner for 1 term however a vote of no confidence in the beginning of his second year gave the mayoralty to the Bloc Party represented by Joan Caselles i Mengual, in that order. En the elections of 2011 the Bloc party's candidate Joan Caselles i Mengual took over the mayoralty for the next four years.
