= Angèle (film) =

1934 French film by Marcel Pagnol

- Directed by: Marcel Pagnol
- Written by: Jean Giono (novel); Marcel Pagnol
- Produced by: Marcel Pagnol
- Starring: Orane Demazis; Fernandel; Henri Poupon
- Cinematography: Willy Faktorovitch; Roger Ledru; Gricha
- Edited by: Suzanne de Troye; André Robert
- Music by: Vincent Scotto
- Production company: Films Marcel Pagnol
- Distributed by: Interama, Inc.
- Release date: 3 November 1934
- Running time: 145 minutes
- Country: France
- Language: French

Angèle is a 1934 French drama film directed, produced and written by Marcel Pagnol, based on the 1929 novel Un de Baumugnes by Jean Giono. It stars Orane Demazis.

== Plot ==
A naive young woman, Angèle, leaves the farm where she has been raised after being seduced by a shrewd man who turns out to be a pimp. An honest handsome farm employee, Albin, tries to prevent her from going, but without success since she is mesmerized by Louis, the manipulating pimp.

She becomes a street prostitute in Marseille and leads a sad life. To make things worse, she has a child. A kind friend of hers, the childish and apparently a little mentally under-developed Saturnin, finds her thanks to some unexpected information. He brings her back home to her kind mother but the woman's father, Clarius, is so ashamed of what happened that he locks her in a cellar and hides her. He threatens anybody who shows up with his rifle. Albin, still in love with Angèle, and hoping she will return one day, works in the vicinity of the farm with Amédée, an older kind and helpful friend.

After some difficulties, Amédée manages to get employed at Clarius's farm, being supported by Angèle's mother, and above all because Clarius cannot work due to a bad arm needing a long rest and care. At first, Amédée believes Angèle is still away and has to disappoint Albin by telling him so. But on a stormy rainy night, the cellar being in danger of becoming flooded, Amédée sees her as she gets out of the cellar. He tells Albin, who cleverly frees the girl and is accepted when he asks for her hand. Albin goes back to Clarius's farm to talk to him and ask for the girl's hand in the traditional way. Clarius, impressed by Albin, finally gives in and invites his daughter to sit on her usual chair at the kitchen table, which symbolizes that everything is finally forgiven.

== Cast ==
- Orane Demazis as Angèle Barbaroux
- Fernandel as Saturnin
- Henri Poupon as Clarius Barbaroux
- Jean Servais as Albin
- Annie Toinon as Philomène Barbaroux
- Blanche Poupon as Florence
- Marcelle Vial as the little maid
- Thommeray as the monsieur in town
- Andrex as Louis
- Charles Blavette as Tonin (as Blavette)
- Juliette Petit as L'Esmenarde
- Fernand Flament as Jo (as Flament)
- Darcelys as the tattowed man
- Delaurme as the bar owner
- Édouard Delmont as Amédée (as E. Delmont)
