= Lovers Are Never Losers =

1929 novel by Jean Giono

- Title page for Lovers Are Never Losers (1931 edition)
- Author: Jean Giono
- Original title: Un de Baumugnes
- Translator: Jacques Le Clercq
- Language: French
- Publisher: Éditions Grasset
- Publication date: 1929
- Publication place: France
- English publication date: 1931
- Pages: 228

Lovers Are Never Losers (French: Un de Baumugnes) is a 1929 novel by the French writer Jean Giono. It tells a love story set in rural France in the early 20th century. It is the standalone second entry in Giono's Pan trilogy; it was preceded by Colline and followed by Second Harvest. It was published in English in 1931, translated by Jacques Le Clercq.

== Adaptation ==
The novel was the basis for the 1934 French film Angèle. The film was directed by Marcel Pagnol and stars Orane Demazis, Fernandel and Henri Poupon. A Turkish adaptation directed by Ömer Lütfi Akad was released in 1957 as Kara Talih.
