= A King Alone =

Novel by Jean Giono

- Author: Jean Giono
- Original title: Un roi sans divertissement
- Language: French
- Publisher: Éditions de la Table ronde
- Publication date: June 1947
- Publication place: France
- Pages: 285

A King Alone (French: Un roi sans divertissement, lit. 'A King Without Distraction') is a 1947 novel by the French writer Jean Giono. The narrative is set between 1843 and 1848 in the French Prealps and follows a police officer who discovers unpleasant truths about himself during a murder investigation. It was the first book by Giono to be published after World War II and marks the beginning of a new phase in the author's oeuvre.

The book was the basis for the 1963 film A King Without Distraction and the 2021 comic book Un roi sans divertissement.

== Origin ==
Jean Giono was a pacifist and had participated in the journal La Gerbe which was seen with suspicion after World War II. He was imprisoned in 1944 by commissars from the French Resistance and blacklisted by the Conseil national des écrivains. Un roi sans divertissement was written in the autumn of 1946. The lyrical prose and humanism of Giono's works from the interwar period were replaced by pessimism and sarcastic humor, which came to characterize many of the author's post-war novels.

== Publication ==
Published by Éditions de la Table ronde in June 1947, Un roi sans divertissement broke the embargo imposed by the Conseil national des écrivains, becoming Giono's first post-war work. It was subsequently republished by Éditions Gallimard in December of the same year. Giono later categorized this novel, along with several others from the post-war period, as "chroniques romanesques" or "romantic chronicles."

In 2019, Alyson Waters translated the novel into English under the title, A King Alone.

== Adaptations ==
The book was the basis for the 1963 film A King Without Distraction, directed by François Leterrier from a screenplay by Giono.

It was adapted into the 2021 comic book Un roi sans divertissement written by Jean Dufaux and illustrated by Jacques Terpant.
