= Harvest (1937 film) =

1937 film

- Theatrical release poster
- Directed by: Marcel Pagnol
- Screenplay by: Marcel Pagnol
- Based on: Second Harvest by Jean Giono
- Produced by: Marcel Pagnol
- Starring: Fernandel; Orane Demazis; Marguerite Moreno; Gabriel Gabrio
- Cinematography: Willy Faktorovitch; Roger Ledru; Pierre Arnaudy; Henri Darriès
- Edited by: Suzanne de Troye
- Music by: Arthur Honegger
- Production company: Les Films Marcel Pagnol
- Distributed by: Compagnie méditerranéenne de films
- Release date: 29 October 1937
- Running time: 150 minutes
- Country: France
- Language: French

Harvest (French: Regain) is a 1937 French drama film directed by Marcel Pagnol, starring Fernandel, Orane Demazis, Marguerite Moreno and Gabriel Gabrio. The narrative revolves around a farming village where only three inhabitants remain, but they are told that if only one of them, Panturle, manages to find a wife, the village will be able to prosper again. The film is based on the 1930 novel Second Harvest by Jean Giono. It was released in France on 28 October 1937 and in the United States on 2 October 1939.

== Cast ==
- Fernandel as Urbain Gédémus
- Gabriel Gabrio as Panturle
- Orane Demazis as Irène Charles, "Arsule"
- Marguerite Moreno as Zia Mamèche, "la Mamèche"
- Robert Le Vigan as the brigadier
- Henri Poupon as Panturle's farmer friend
- Odette Roger as Alphonsine
- Milly Mathis as Belline

== Reception ==
Frank Nugent of The New York Times described Harvest as "a film of utter serenity and great goodness, so reverently played and so compassionately directed that it is far less an entertainment work than it is a testament to the dignity of man and to his consonance with the spinning of the spheres. Such faults as it possesses are mechanical; uneven editing, particularly in the early scenes; skimping of a few sequences that might have received more attention; attenuation of others that could have been cut. The flaws are obvious enough, yet they should not count too seriously against the work as a whole and still less seriously when one appreciates that the editing was on this side of the water (for space and time requirements) and cannot properly be held against Marcel Pagnol, its director, producer and adapter."

== See also ==
- 1939 in film
- Cinema of France
