= The Solitude of Compassion =

- First edition of the title story in 1930
- Author: Jean Giono
- Original title: Solitude de la pitié
- Translator: Edward Ford
- Language: French
- Publisher: Éditions Gallimard
- Publication date: 19 September 1932
- Publication place: France
- English publication date: 2002
- Pages: 224

The Solitude of Compassion (French: Solitude de la pitié) is a 1932 collection of short stories by the French writer Jean Giono, some of which had appeared earlier. The stories focus on rural life in Provence. The book was published in English in 2002, translated by Edward Ford.

== Stories ==
1. The Solitude of Compassion (Solitude de la pitié)
2. Prelude to Pan (Prélude de Pan)
3. Fields (Champs)
4. Ivan Ivanovitch Kossiakoff (Ivan Ivanovitch Kossiakoff)
5. The Hand (La main)
6. Annette or A Family Affair (Annette ou une affaire de famille)
7. On the Side of the Road (Au bord des routes)
8. Jofroi de Maussan (Jofroi de la Maussan)
9. Philmon (Philémon)
10. Joselet
11. Sylvie
12. Babeau
13. The Sheep (Le mouton)
14. In the Land of the Tree Cutters (Au pays des coupeurs d'arbres)
15. The Great Fence (La grande barrière)
16. The Destruction of Paris (Destruction de Paris)
17. Magnetism (Magnétisme)
18. Fear of the Land (Peur de la terre)
19. Lost Rafts (Radeaux perdus)
20. Song of the World (Le chant du monde)

== Reception ==
Kirkus Reviews wrote in 2002: "Although most of the pieces here, first published in France in 1932, are set in the hamlets and countryside of Provence, they bring us into a world that is dark, spiteful, and lugubrious: a world of hard-hearted peasants bent on squeezing the life out of their neighbors much as they squeeze oil from their olives. ... Like Faulkner, Giono takes us into an unpleasant world shot through with strange and unexpected beauty."

== Adaptations ==
The story "Jofroi de Maussan" was the basis for the 1934 film Jofroi directed by Marcel Pagnol. Between 1987 and 1990, France 2 made a series of six Giono adaptations under the title L'ami Giono, of which three were based on stories from The Solitude of Compassion: Jofroi de la Maussan (1987), Solitude de la pitié (1988) and Ivan Ivanovitch Kossiakoff (1990).
