= Colline =

1929 novel by Jean Giono

- Author: Jean Giono
- Language: French
- Publisher: Bernard Grasset
- Publication date: 1929
- Publication place: France
- English publication date: 1929
- Pages: 198

Colline is a 1929 novel by the French writer Jean Giono. It has also been published as Hill of Destiny. It tells the story of a small hamlet in Provence where the superstitious residents struggle against nature, as their settlement is struck by several misfortunes. Colline was Giono's debut novel. It is the first installment in the author's Pan trilogy; it was followed by the standalone novels Lovers are Never Losers and Second Harvest.

== Plot ==
A wild boar enters a village by the Lure mountain range. The villagers try to kill the boar but it manages to escape.

The local spring goes dry which causes unrest. At the same time, the bedridden, paralysed village elder Janet begins to speak incomprehensibly. Other misfortunes follow, including a devastating forest fire, and the villagers begin to suspect that Janet is the source of the problems. In hope that it will end the misfortunes, the villagers agree that they should kill Janet. Just before they kill him, though, he dies of natural causes.

The boar once again enters the village. This time the villagers succeed in killing it.

== Publication ==
The book was published in 1929 by Bernard Grasset. An English translation by Jacques Le Clercq was published as Hill of Destiny by Brentano's in 1929. A new translation by Brian Nelson was published in 1986 as Colline.

== Reception ==
Teodore Purdy Jr. wrote in The Saturday Review: "Giono's particular distinction lies in the emphasis which he puts on the unknown element, the hidden malice which accompanies every event of his story. ... The power of the soil, the trees, and the beasts of the field,—'even the small ones,' M. Giono adds,—over the blindly struggling peasant has seldom been more eloquently stated. M. Giono's manner is simple and unaffected, since he has not yet acquired academic airs and graces."
