= Second Harvest (novel) =

Book by Jean Giono

- Author: Jean Giono
- Original title: Regain
- Language: French
- Publisher: Éditions Grasset
- Publication date: 1930
- Publication place: France
- English publication date: 1937
- Pages: 240

Second Harvest (French: Regain) is a 1930 novel by the French writer Jean Giono. The narrative is set in a nearly abandoned village, where the last heir succeeds to find love in a woman who saves him from a river.

The book was published in English in 1939 as Harvest, in 1967 as Regain and in 1999 as Second Harvest. It was the basis for the 1937 film Harvest directed by Marcel Pagnol.

== Reception ==
Publishers Weekly wrote in 1999: "Giono invests his prose with stunning descriptions of the countryside and lyrical evocations of the majestic seasons ('Spring clung to his shoulders like a big cat'). The couple's romance is practical and their partnership utilitarian, but Giono renders their love lavish as they make a life where the air smells of lavender and where 'such a passion has seized the earth... such a passion!'"
