= Jean Giono =

French writer (1895–1970)

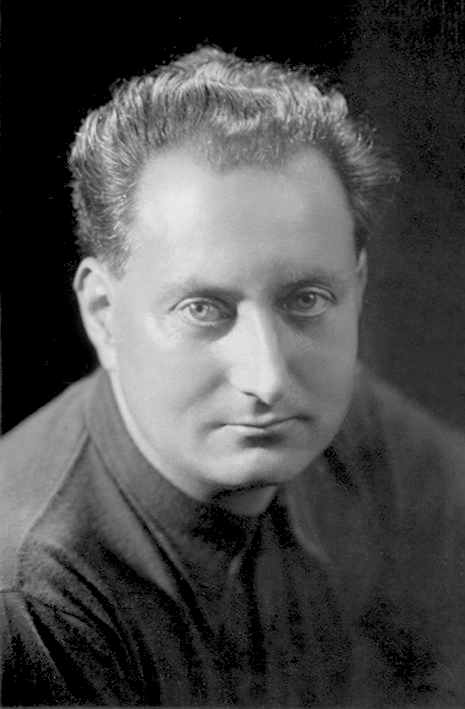
- Born: 30 March 1895; Manosque, France
- Died: 8 October 1970 (aged 75); Manosque, France
- Occupation: Writer
- Writing career
- Notable works: Colline; Second Harvest; Un roi sans divertissement; The Horseman on the Roof
- Movement: Popular culture
- Website: www.centrejeangiono.com

Jean Giono (30 March 1895 – 8 October 1970) was a French writer who wrote works of fiction mostly set in the Provence region of France.

== First period ==
Jean Giono was born to a family of modest means. His father a cobbler of Piedmontese descent and his mother a laundry woman. He spent the majority of his life in Manosque, Alpes-de-Haute-Provence. Forced by family needs to leave school at the age of sixteen and get a job in a bank, he nevertheless continued to read voraciously, in particular the great classic works of literature including the Bible, Homer's Iliad, the works of Virgil, and the Tragiques of Agrippa d'Aubigné. He continued to work at the bank until he was called up for military service at the outbreak of World War I. He took part in the Battle of Verdun. The horrors he experienced on the front lines turned him into an ardent and lifelong pacifist. In 1919, he returned to the bank, and a year later, married a childhood friend with whom he had two children. Following the success of his first published novel, Colline (1929) (which won him the Prix Brentano earned $1,000, and drew an English translation of the book), he left the bank in 1930 to devote himself to writing on a full-time basis.

Colline was followed by two more novels heavily influenced by Virgil and Homer, Un de Baumugnes (1929) and Regain (1930), the three together comprising the famous "Pan trilogy", so-called because in it Giono depicts the natural world as being imbued with the power of the Greek god Pan. The other novels Giono published during the nineteen-thirties on the whole continued in the same vein—set in Provence, with peasants as protagonists, and displaying a pantheistic view of nature. Marcel Pagnol based three of his films on Giono's work of this period: Regain, starring Fernandel and with music by Honegger; Angèle, and La Femme du boulanger, with the actor Raimu.

Throughout the nineteen-thirties, Giono expressed the pacifism he had adopted as a result of his experiences during World War I in novels such as Le grand troupeau (1931), and pamphlets such as Refus d'obéissance (1937), and the Lettre aux paysans sur la pauvreté et la paix (1938). This in turn resulted in his forming a relationship with a group of like-minded people including Lucien Jacques and Henri Fluchère among others, who gathered each year in the hamlet of Contadour, and whose pacifist writings were published as the Cahiers du Contadour.

In 1937, he famously asked, "What is the worst that can happen if Germany invades France?"

== Transition ==
The end of the nineteen-thirties brought a crisis in Giono's life. As far as his writing was concerned, he had come to feel that it was time to stop "doing Giono" (faire du Giono), and to take his work in a new direction. At the same time it was becoming apparent that his work for pacifism was a failure, and that another war was inevitable and fast approaching. The declaration of war on 1 September 1939 came while the Contadoureans were assembled for their annual reunion. The result of Giono's former peace-making efforts was that he was briefly imprisoned as a Nazi sympathiser before the proceedings were dropped without any charges being laid.

The subsequent period of renewal saw the self-educated Giono now turn to Stendhal as a literary model in the same way as previously he had been influenced by the Classics. His novels thus began to be set in a specific time and place, confronting the protagonists with specific politics, issues, causes and events, in contrast with the timelessness of his earlier work. He also adopted the Stendhalian narrative technique of letting the reader into the experience of the protagonist by means of the interior monologue, whereas the dominant technique of his earlier novels had been that of the omniscient narrator.

He similarly formed the ambition of writing a sequence of ten novels inspired by Balzac’s Comédie humaine, in which he would depict characters from all strata of society rather than peasants, and compare and contrast different moments in history by depicting the experiences of members of the same family in times a hundred years apart. This project was never realised, with only the four Hussard novels, (Angelo (1958), Le Hussard sur le Toit (1951), Le Bonheur fou (1957), Mort d'un personnage (1948)) actually completed according to plan, but it is echoed in Giono's postwar work in the dichotomy between historical novels set in the mid-nineteenth century, and contemporary novels set in the mid-twentieth. His newfound interest in history even led to his writing an actual history book, Le Désastre de Pavie (1963).

As he began to focus on the human being rather than the natural world, his understanding of psychology and motivation was also influenced by the writings of Niccolò Machiavelli, whose analysis helped him to articulate a much darker view of human nature in his later years, and about whom he wrote the article "Monsieur Machiavel, ou le coeur humain dévoilé" (1951).

In 1944, when France was liberated, Giono was again accused of collaboration with the Nazis, and was again imprisoned for five months before he was freed without charges ever being made. This led to his being blacklisted, so that for three years he was barred from publication. It was during this period of ostracism that he began in 1945 to write Angelo, metaphorically the laboratory in which he experimented, tested and attempted to integrate his new approach to his work. It contains not only a first version of the story of Angelo Pardi that took its final form in Le Hussard sur le toit and Le Bonheur fou, but also the nucleus of many other works of his second period, and makes use of new narrative techniques he developed further in other novels. He ultimately set it aside, no doubt considering it too derivative, and moved on to the other projects it gave rise to.

== Second period ==
The first major novel of his second period to be published was Un roi sans divertissement (published in 1947, and made into a successful film for which Giono himself wrote the screenplay, in 1963). It takes the form of a detective story set in Haute Provence in the early nineteenth century, and reveals Giono's new pessimism about human nature in that the policeman is forced to the realisation that he himself is capable of being as evil as the murderer he is tracking. Stylistically brilliant, it consists of the juxtaposed accounts of events as told by the different people affected, devoid of explanation, from which the reader must piece together the meaning.

The most famous novel of his second period is Le Hussard sur le toit, the first part of the definitive version of the story of Angelo Pardi he had sketched in Angelo. It was published in 1951, and made into a film by Jean-Paul Rappeneau starring Juliette Binoche in 1995. Angélo, like Stendhal's Fabrice del Dongo (La Chartreuse de Parme) on whom he is modeled, is a chivalrous romantic whose quest constitutes an inquiry into the nature of happiness, while the cholera epidemic he finds himself confronted with in Provence in 1832 is an allegory for the wars that had so deeply affected Giono. In structure it is a picaresque series of episodes, full of evocative descriptions of the country. Its sequel, Le Bonheur fou (The Straw Man) (1957) follows Angélo in the Italy of the 1848 revolution.

Les Ames fortes (1950), filmed by Raoul Ruiz in 2001, is another of the masterpieces of this period. As dark as Un Roi sans divertissement, it examines the depths a person can sink to in greed, grasping self-interest and the exploitation of others. Also as in Un Roi sans divertissement, the story is again told purely in the words of the protagonists, without the intervention of a narrator or comment from the author, thus forcing readers to reach their own conclusions. Les Grands chemins (1951), considerably less dark, deals with the nature of the road, gambling, the lie, and friendship, again in a first-person narration entirely in the voice of the protagonist and devoid of explanation or elucidation from the author.

Another work of significance is Voyage en Italie (1953). Neither a travel guide nor a straightforward account of a trip as the name suggests, this is a highly personal account of Giono's experiences that reveals more about Giono than about Italy itself.

Outside France, Giono's best-known work is probably the short story The Man who Planted Trees (and 1987 film version). This optimistic tale of a man who brings a deserted valley back to life by planting trees reflects Giono's long-standing love of the natural world, an attitude that made him a precursor to the modern ecological movement. He thus declined to receive any royalties from this text, and granted free use to anyone who wanted to distribute or translate it. The French forestry authority (ONF) initiated a project named "Giono" in 2013. A small plot of beech trees of more southerly genetics was planted as an assisted migration experiment for climate change adaptation on the former World War I battlefield in Verdun. As of 2024, the beech saplings are growing well.

In his later years, Giono was honoured with the Prince Rainier of Monaco literary prize in 1953, awarded for his lifetime achievements, was elected to the Académie Goncourt in 1954, and became a member of the Conseil Littéraire of Monaco in 1963.

Giono died of a heart attack in 1970.

The Collège Jean Giono in Nice is named after him, as are streets in Cannes and Fréjus.
