= Albion Plateau =

French plain

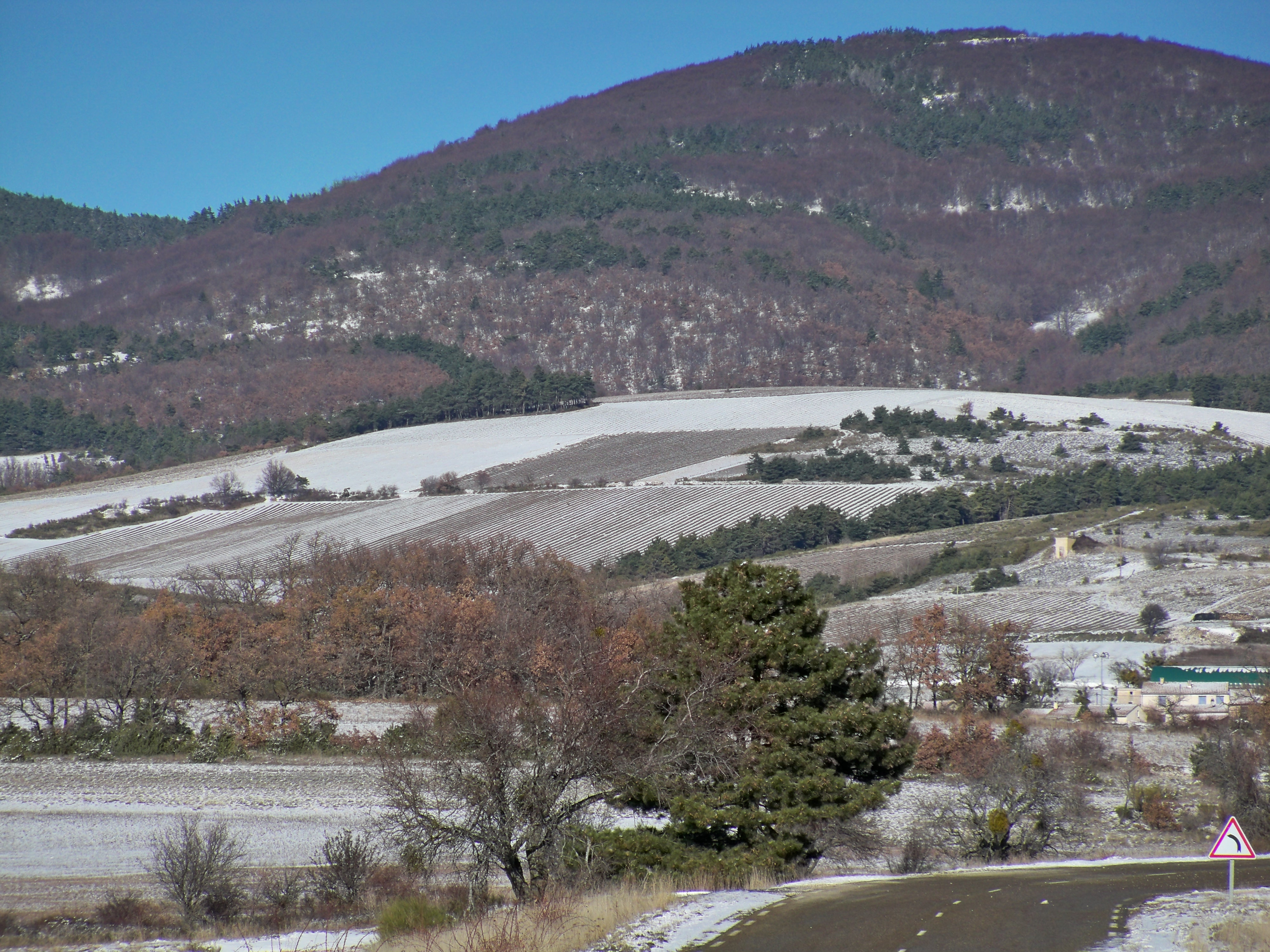
- The plateau at Saint-Trinit.

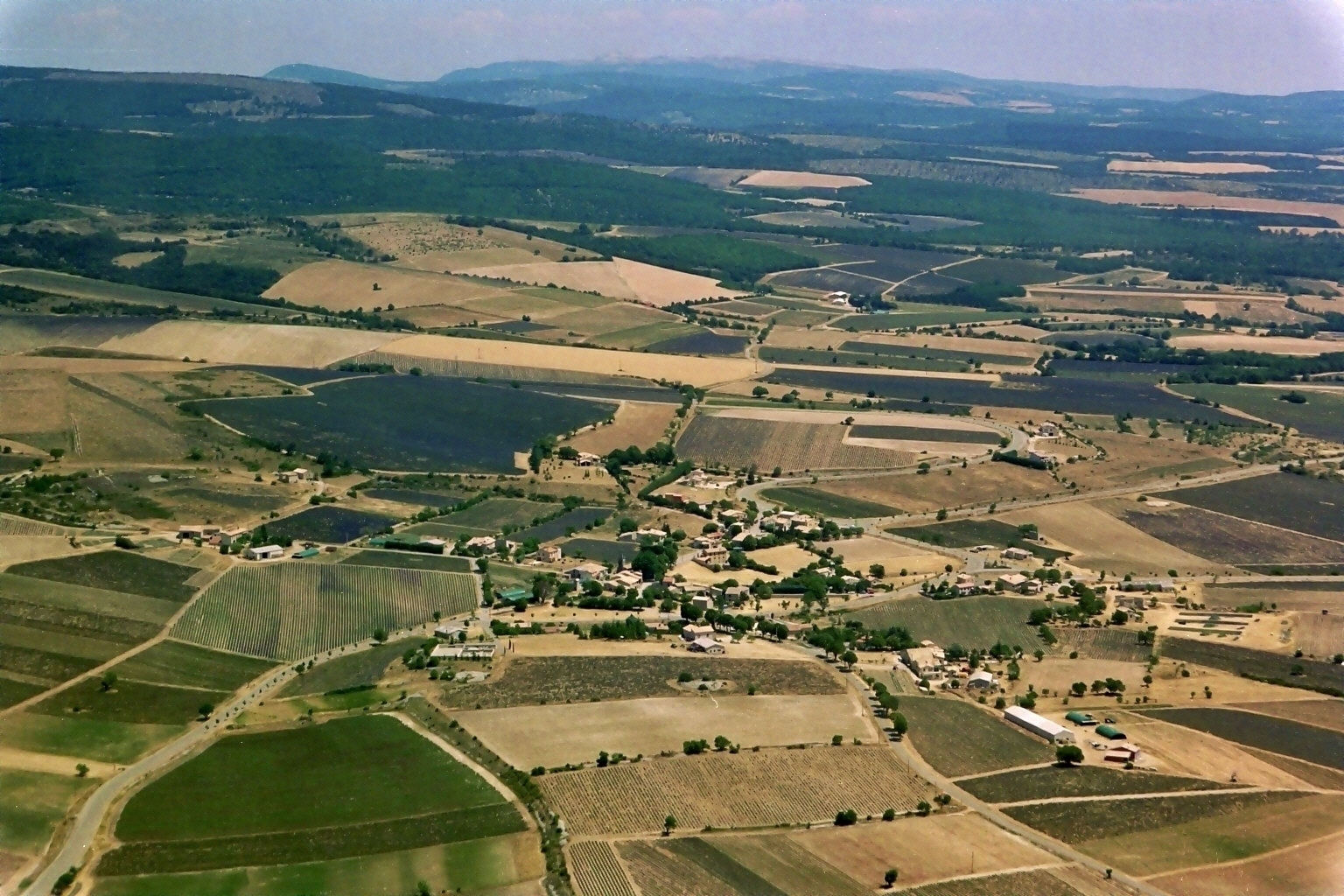

- Location within France
- Country: France
- Regions: Provence-Alpes-Côte d'Azur and Auvergne-Rhône-Alpes
- Departments: Vaucluse; Drôme; Alpes-de-Haute-Provence
- Communes: Ferrassières; Aurel; Revest-du-Bion; Saint-Trinit Saint-Christol; Simiane-la-Rotonde; Sault

Population
  - Total: 3,969 (2,007)

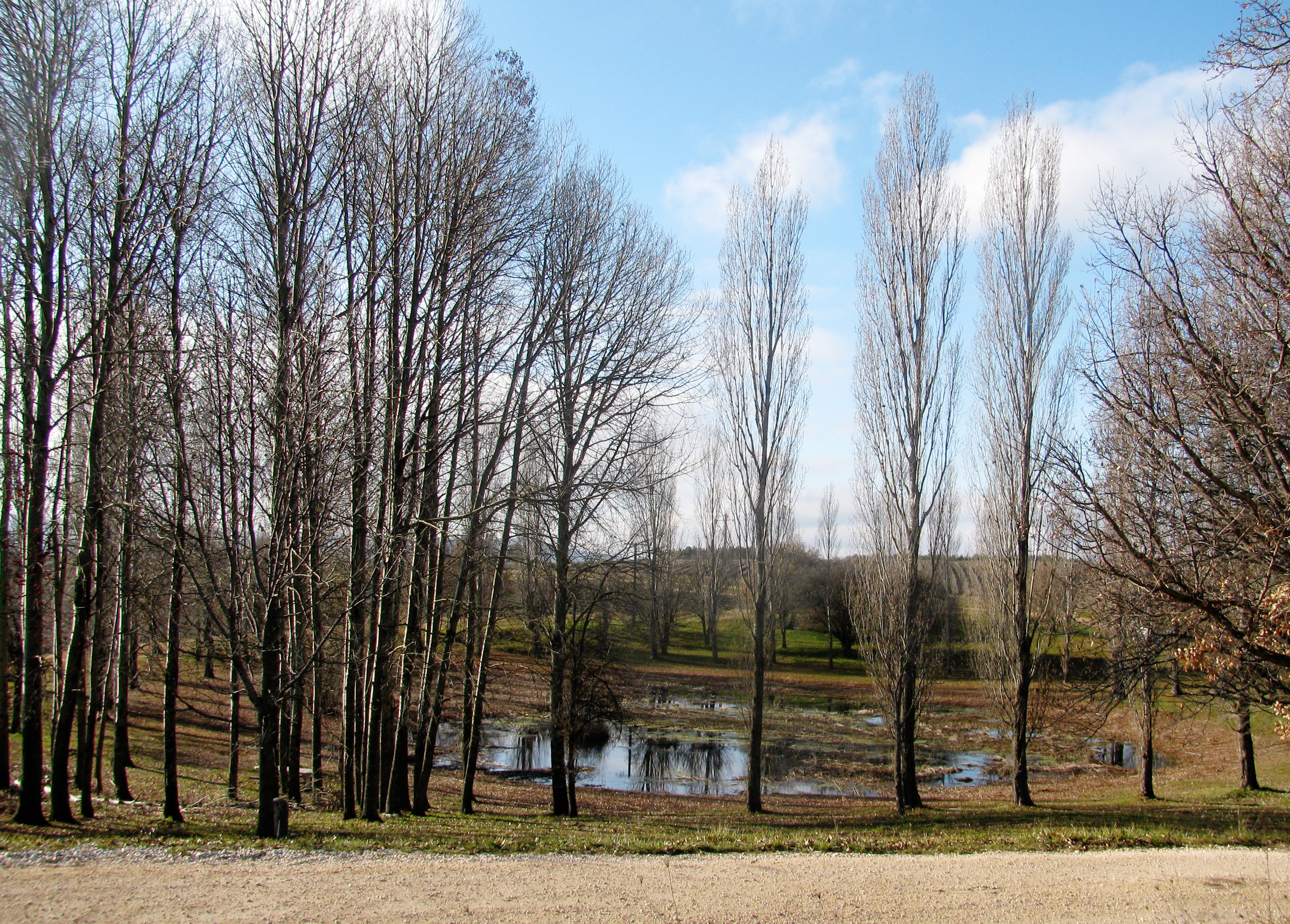
Doline known as the Pond.

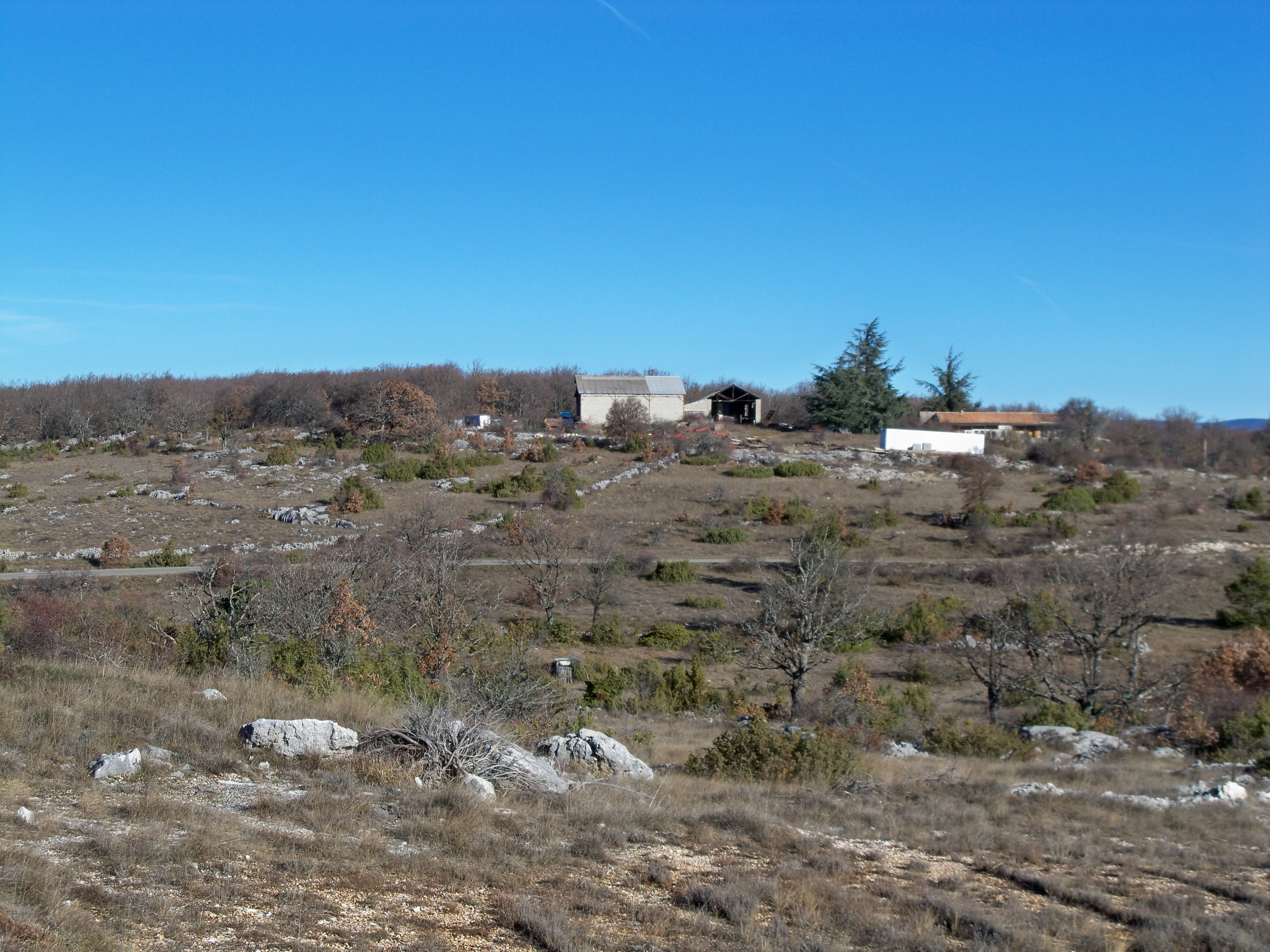
Karstic facies with lapiaz.

The Albion Plateau is a high plain located across the French departments of Vaucluse, Drôme, and Alpes-de-Haute-Provence. It is administratively divided into seven municipalities: Sault and Aurel (Vaucluse), Ferrassières (Drôme), Revest-du-Bion and Simiane-la-Rotonde (Alpes-de-Haute-Provence), and Saint-Trinit and Saint-Christol (Vaucluse).

From 1971 to 1996, the Albion Plateau served as the launch base for the French nuclear deterrent force’s ground-to-ground ballistic missiles, with military installations extending into the municipality of Lagarde-d’Apt.

== Toponymy ==
In Antiquity, the plateau was inhabited by the Albienses, a people belonging to the Albici federation. In Classical Provençal, it is referred to as Plan d’Aubion, and in Mistralian-norm Provençal as Plan d’Aubioun.

== Geography ==
Access to the Albion Plateau is via several mountain passes:

- Col des Abeilles, between Sault and Villes-sur-Auzon,
- Col de l’Homme Mort, to the north, toward Drôme,
- Col du Négron, toward Drôme and the Méouge Valley.

=== Geology ===
During the Jurassic period, more than 1,000 meters of alternating layers of limestone, marl, and clay were deposited.

The plateau rests on a limestone substratum of Urgonian facies (Cretaceous). This formation features a karstic landscape with limestone pavements, calcarenite, and dolines. It is associated with Aptian sedimentary layers and Barremian calcareous sandstones, overlain by siliceous colluvium, alluvium, and Quaternary decalcification clays.

The limestone plateau, characterized by numerous sinkholes, forms a large aquifer extending from the Lure Mountain to Mont Ventoux. Its underground rivers supply the Fontaine de Vaucluse. More than 200 sinkholes or shafts have been identified, often with narrow and difficult-to-access openings. The deepest include the Jean Nouveau shaft, with a 168-meter vertical drop, and the Autran shaft, both exceeding 600 meters in depth. The Souffleur system (Aven des Neiges–Aubert–Trou Souffleur) in Saint-Christol connects to the Albion River at 620 meters, with explorations reaching water-filled chambers at a depth of 921 meters.

=== Climatology ===
The plateau shares the climatic characteristics of the Southern Alps, of which it forms, together with Mont Ventoux and the Lure Mountain, the westernmost chain. It transitions from a Mediterranean climate near Simiane-la-Rotonde to temperate and then continental conditions, with a mountain climate present only at the highest elevations.

Weather report for the Albion plateau at an average altitude of 900 meters
Month	Jan.	Feb.	Mar.	Apr.	May	Jun.	Jul.	Aug.	Sep.	Oct.	Nov.	Dec.	
Average minimum temperature (°C)	−1	−1	2	4	8	12	14	14	11	7	3	−1	5.5
Average temperature (°C)	3.5	5.5	7.5	10	14	18.5	21	21	17	12.5	7.5	2	11.7
Average maximum temperature (°C)	8	10	13	16	20	25	28	28	23	18	12	8	17
Precipitation (mm)	26.9	24.3	23.8	44	40	27.9	20.9	32.7	45.9	53.5	52.4	30.7	482.8

== Fauna and flora ==
Flora of the woodlands include the downy oak, sessile oak, beech, aspen, birch, Scots pine, maritime pine, broom, heather, and chestnut. Seasonal mushrooms are abundant on the plateau, often associated with specific tree species. Common varieties include saffron milk cap, bloody milk cap, black porcini, golden chanterelle (Cantharellus cibarius), hedgehog mushroom (Hydnum repandum), and the Ventoux grayling (Tricholoma myomyces). Other flora include spiny restharrow, erect brome, thyme, ash-colored broom, narrow-leaved lavender, corn gagea, marsh adder’s-tongue, alpine oat-grass, doubtful ventenata, laurel-leaved rockrose, flax-leaved adonis, field bedstraw, small-fruited false flax, three-spined bedstraw, large polycnemum, round-leaved hare’s-ear, corn-cockle, large-caliced androsace, and Spanish sainfoin.

There are numerous diurnal raptors, such as the short-toed snake eagle, Montagu’s harrier, golden eagle, booted eagle, northern goshawk, Eurasian hobby, European honey buzzard; nocturnal raptors include the Eurasian scops owl, Eurasian eagle-owl, little owl, boreal owl. There are also the woodchat shrike, red-backed shrike, southern grey shrike, masked shrike. Other birds include the rock, ortolan, and corn buntings; the common quail and rock sparrow; the western Orphean warbler, European bee-eater, Eurasian hoopoe, Eurasian stone-curlew, lesser spotted woodpecker, corncrake, Eurasian wryneck; the crested lark, Eurasian woodcock, and the little bustard.

Mammals include the red deer, wild boar, fox, hare, rabbit, and bats of the species Leisler's and greater and lesser horseshoe. There is also the parsley frog, asp viper, great capricorn beetle, stag beetle, and Jersey tiger moth.

== Municipalities of the Albion Plateau ==
Municipalities of the Albion Plateau
Municipality		Area	Population	Density	Altitude	Coordinates
84	Aurel	28.9 km^{2}	220 hab.	7.6 hab./km^{2}	mini. 615 m maxi. 1 600 m	44° 07′ 50″ N, 5° 25′ 45″ E
26	Ferrassières	29.27 km^{2}	118 hab.	4 hab./km^{2}	mini. 830 m maxi. 1 389 m	44° 08′ 11″ N, 5° 28′ 45″ E
04	Revest-du-Bion	43.45 km^{2}	536 hab.	12 hab./km^{2}	mini. 833 m maxi. 1 365 m	44° 05′ 01″ N, 5° 32′ 57″ E
84	Saint-Christol	46.08 km^{2}	1 104 hab.	24 hab./km^{2}	mini. 810 m maxi. 1 108 m	44° 01′ 46″ N, 5° 29′ 34″ E
84	Saint-Trinit	16.66 km^{2}	118 hab.	7.1 hab./km^{2}	mini. 780 m maxi. 914 m	44° 06′ 12″ N, 5° 27′ 59″ E
84	Sault	111.15 km^{2}	1 301 hab.	12 hab./km^{2}	mini. 650 m maxi. 1 591 m	44° 05′ 31″ N, 5° 24′ 32″ E
04	Simiane-la-Rotonde	67.86 km^{2}	574 hab.	8.5 hab./km^{2}	mini. 456 m maxi. 1 113 m	43° 58′ 52″ N, 5° 33′ 48″ E

== History ==
=== Contemporary period ===
==== The Resistance ====
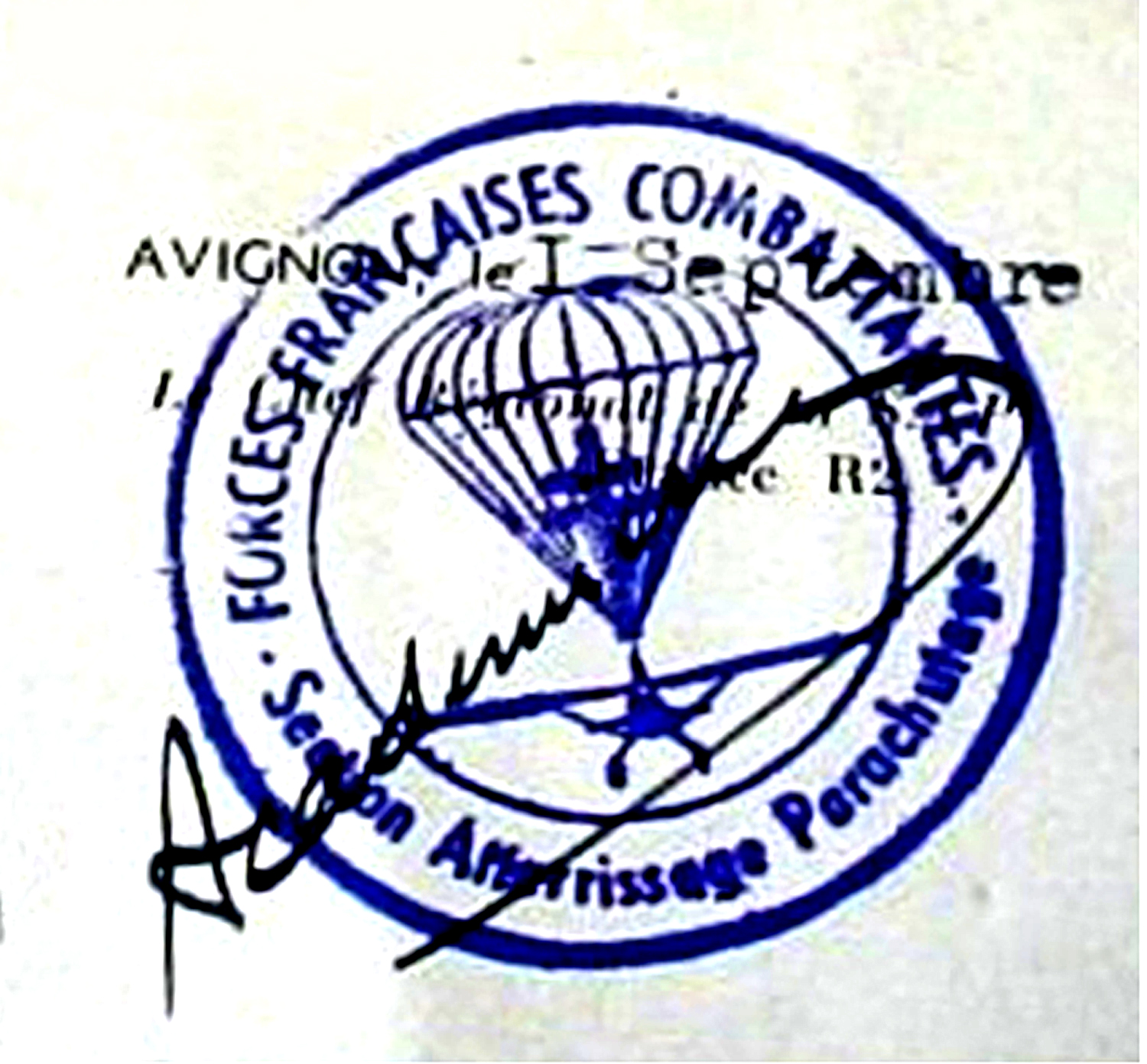
Stamp Section Landing Parachuting of the R 2.

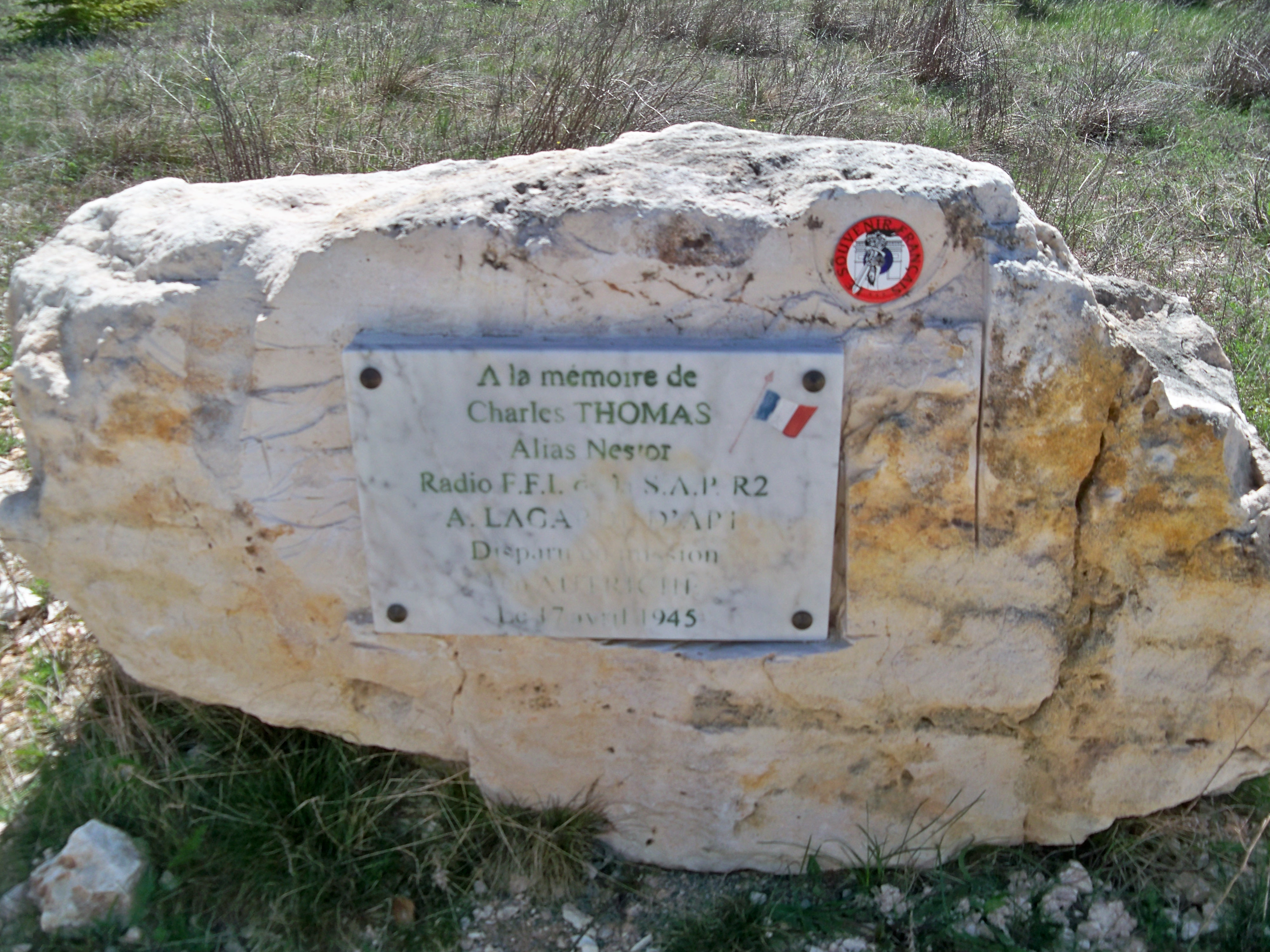
Memorial stone in memory of Charles Thomas, alias Nestor, member of the SAP.

During the Second World War, following the German occupation of Provence, a resistance network was established in the area between Mont Ventoux and the Lure Mountain. At its center, Fernand Jean, head of the Landing and Parachuting Section (SAP), along with deputies Arthur Delan of Caseneuve and Augustin Courveille of Apt, organized a network of landing sites across the Albion Plateau.

Fernand Jean, known as Junot, housed one of the SAP teams in an outbuilding of the Berre farm, located about one kilometer from the Spitfire and Abris landing sites.

He recounted one of the most striking episodes of the spirit of resistance that prevailed then: “On July 1, 1944, the occupying Security Services carried out a lightning raid on the farm. All my men managed to flee along with one of the family’s sons, Marcel Gaillard. They were forced to watch helplessly as the tragedy unfolded inexorably. Without any form of trial, Madame Blanche Gaillard, widow, was shot in front of her home, before the eyes of her other children, including Marceau Gaillard. He was fourteen years old at the time. Three times, he was put against the wall to make him confess where the maquisards and weapons were hidden. He knew, but he said nothing! He was ultimately spared, but the Boches set fire to the farm.”

==== The Village of Revest-du-Bion as seen by ethnologists ====
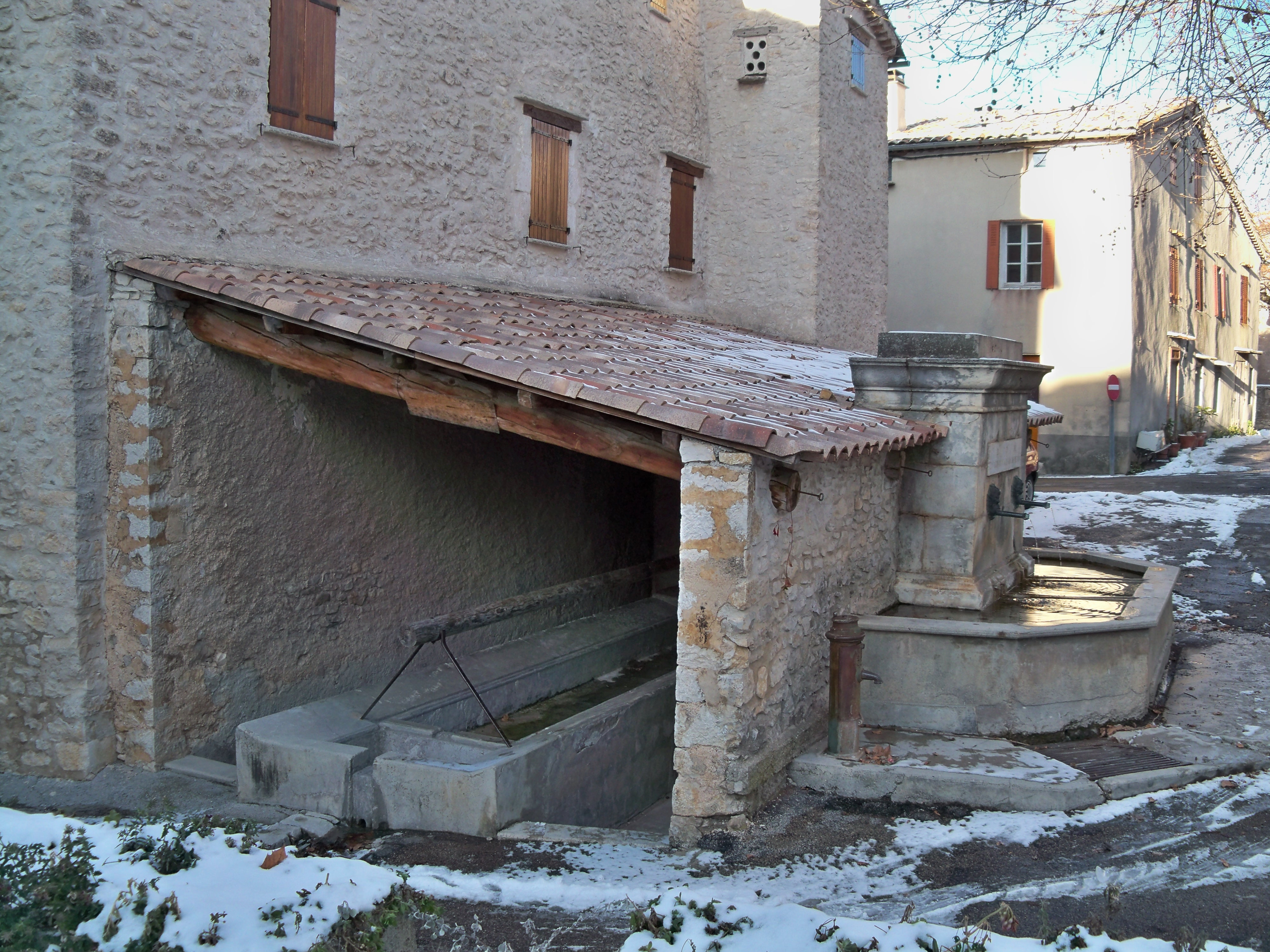
Wash house and fountain in Le Revest.

In 1971, ethnology students from the University of Provence at Aix-en-Provence, within the framework of the CERESM program, conducted a study of the village’s environmental and economic characteristics.

The village, built on a central mound within the municipality, functions as a hub where paths, drove roads, and roads converge, linking dispersed agricultural holdings and connecting the area to surrounding settlements. Its position has historically made it an important center for the distribution of goods through local shops and for the circulation of information in public spaces. However, some paths leading from farms toward neighboring municipalities, particularly in the northern part of Revest, have been poorly maintained and remain difficult to use.

The village community developed a strong sense of identity, expressed in the phrase “I am Revestois,” signifying belonging to Revest and its long-established population. Outsiders were categorized with specific terms: those from the plateau were called estrangié du dedans (“outsider from within”), those from the surrounding region estrangié du dehors (“outsider from outside”), and those from elsewhere estrangié pas d’ici (“outsider not from here”).

A distinction existed within the communal population between residents of the village and those living outside it. This reflected differences between the largely self-sufficient peasantry in the surrounding “quarters” and the villagers, who had access to public spaces, services, shops, and a place of worship.

On the plateau, the term quartier refers to areas that may be inhabited or uninhabited. These areas can be named after families, such as Plan des Barruols, Les Cléments, Le Michalet, Le Gendre, or Les Morards, or after geographical features, such as Combe de Bordeaux, Font d’Artigues, Combe du Pommier, or Le Médéric. Until the mid-20th century, residents of these outlying settlements regularly traveled to the village, typically three times a week, to shop and obtain bread from the baker, to whom they had previously supplied flour.

The central square functioned as the main space of village sociability, bringing together multiple activities within a small area. It served as a gathering place with benches, cafés, and a washhouse; a site of leisure with a boules ground; a center of economic activity with shops and public services; and a reference point marked by the public clock. It also provided a setting for social interaction and display.

A survey conducted in the 1970s indicated that village spaces were informally divided according to gender and age. Men primarily frequented cafés, the boules ground, the town hall, and a square reserved for their use. Women gathered at fountains, the washhouse, shops, and the church. The elderly occupied separate spaces, often benches located in shaded areas during summer and sunny areas in winter. Children primarily used the new village square.

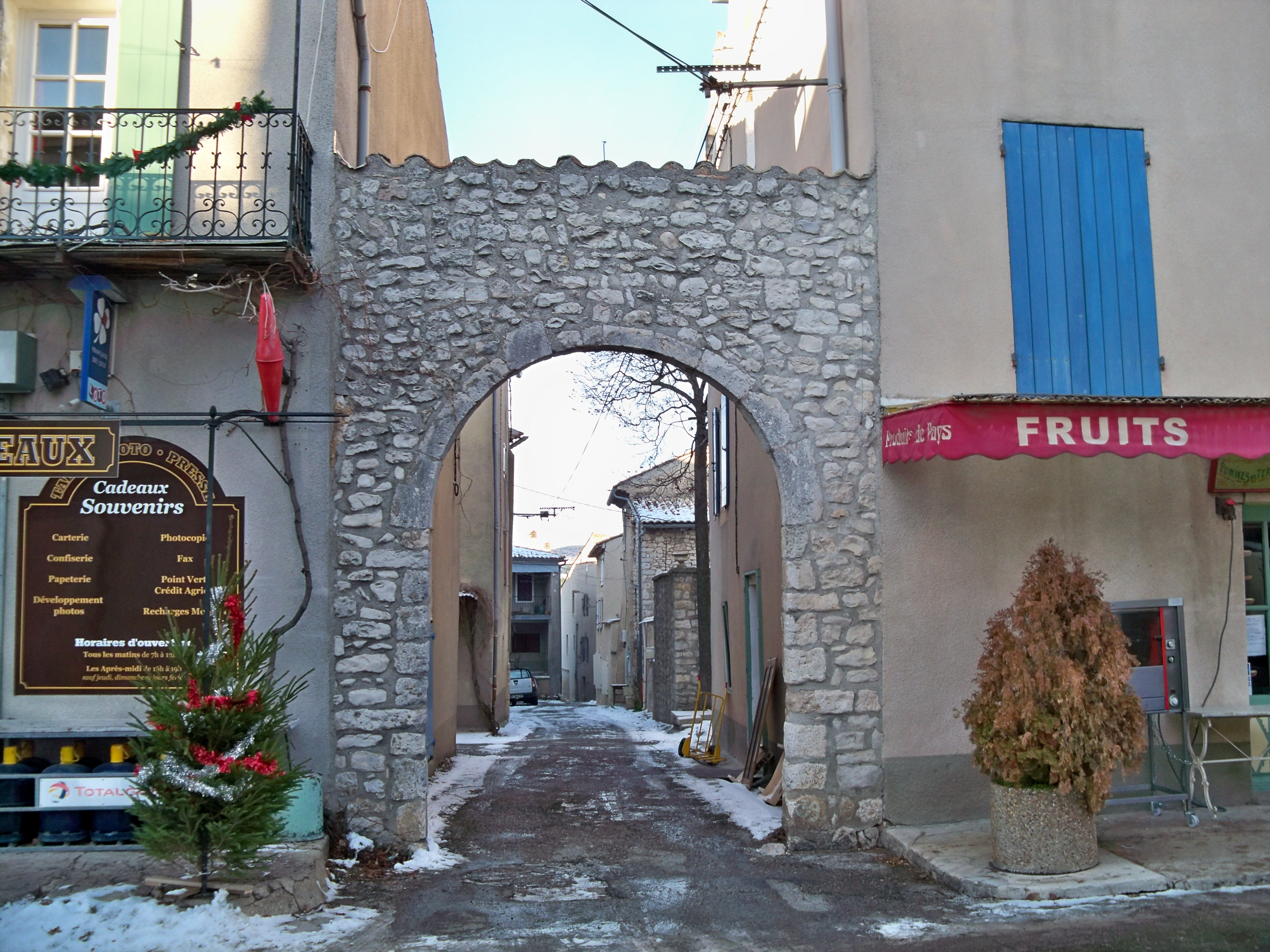
Le Portissol.

From the early 20th century, Portissol Square served as an economic center. It hosted the four annual Revest fairs and functioned as a marketplace where lavender, agricultural products, and household goods were sold. Local shops offered wheat, potatoes, game, mushrooms, charcoal, and ochre, while some products, such as thrushes and mushrooms, were exchanged through barter for items like coffee, sugar, chocolate, soap, or canned goods.

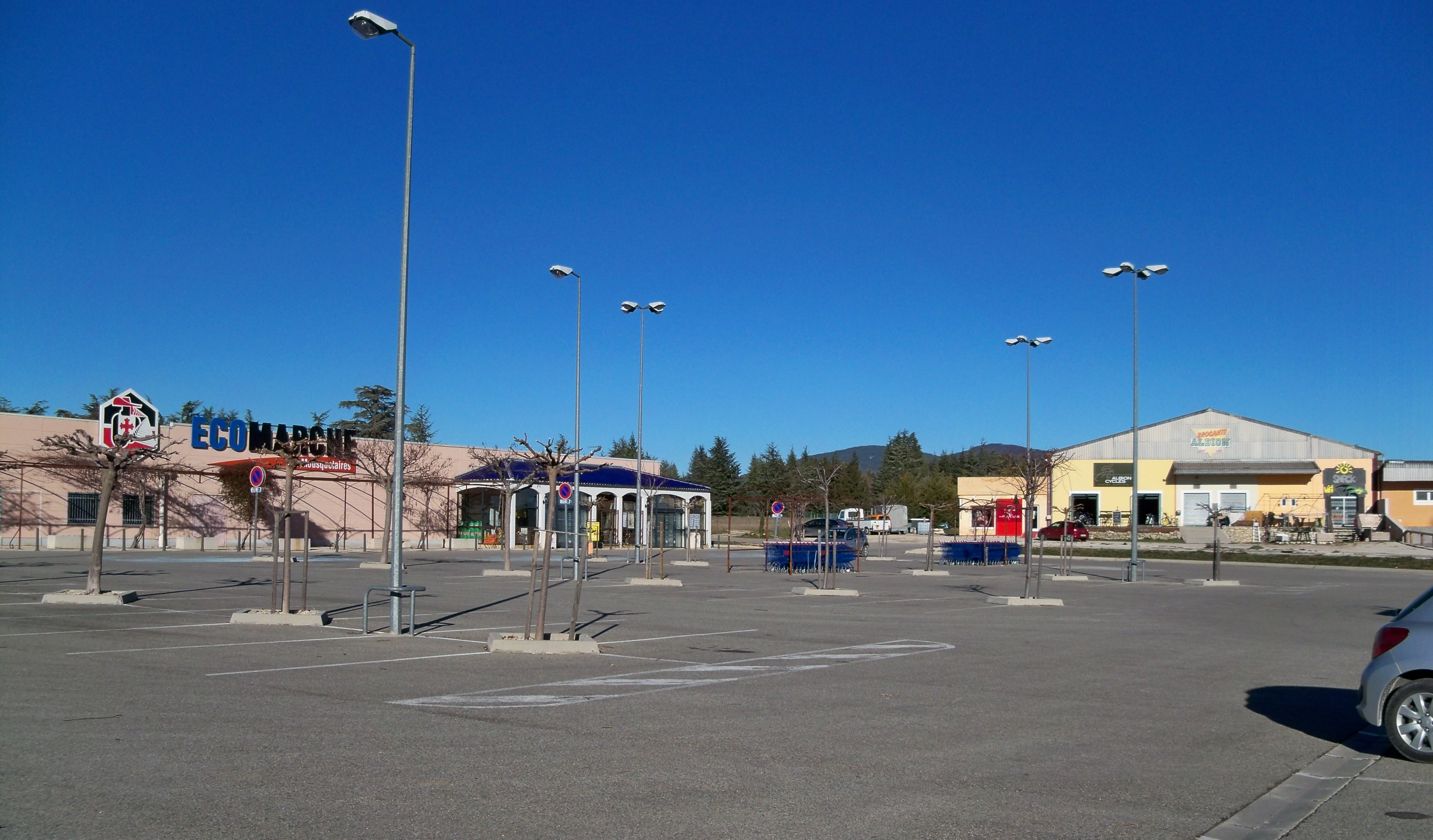
Sault shopping area.

In the second half of the 20th century, the village continued to serve as a center for the sale of cereals, wool, straw, fodder, and almonds, which passed through a local broker. Honey, mushrooms, cheeses, eggs, and poultry were partly resold by shopkeepers in Portissol Square. Potatoes were traded in Saint-Christol, lambs and wool in Sault, and thrushes and mushrooms to a cannery in Saint-Trinit. Lavender was marketed through brokers based in Séderon, Sault, or Carpentras. A significant change occurred at the end of the 1960s with the establishment of medium-sized stores in Sault, followed by the development of a commercial zone.

At the end of the 19th century and the beginning of the 20th century, numerous fairs were organized on the Plateau d’Albion. The inhabitants of Revest generally attended only those held in their village, with the exception of fairs in Sault (Palm Sunday, Saint John, Our Lady, and Saint Catherine), the Tommes fair in Banon on Saint Peter’s Day, and the horse fair in Barret-de-Lioure. Despite its altitude of 950 meters, the village’s location on a plateau facilitated communication with neighboring communities. Its central position allowed it to host four annual fairs, the most important being the Machottes fair in early July. These fairs attracted farmers and shepherds from surrounding villages, including Contadour, Banon, Sault, Ferrassières, and Saint-Christol, and played a significant role in horse trading and lamb sales. A notary from Banon was present to record transactions.

In Revest, where large landholdings were predominant, farms were distributed across different communal lands, including heathland, woods, meadows, and arable fields. This organization reflected traditional rights to water and irrigable plots. Springs, wells, reservoirs, and fountains were considered communal property.

Heathlands and woods, used for hunting and gathering products such as mushrooms and chestnuts, as well as drove roads for livestock passage, were subject to specific management due to their economic significance. Hunting was regulated through a system of progressive fees established by managing associations. Landowners paid the lowest rates, while hunters with no ties to the commune paid the highest. Intermediate fees applied to non-owner residents, former residents, and relatives of landowners. Similar regulations governed the gathering of chestnuts and mushrooms.

The protection of communal property was also reflected in family property, particularly in relation to the household, traditionally considered a feminine domain. Access to the home was preceded by established social rituals and exchanges, often concluding with an invitation to enter.

Changes in marital origins in Le Revest-du-Bion between 1853 and 1970
Revest-du-Bion	Total marriages	Endogamous marriages	Exogamous marriages
1853-1862	75	32	43
1883-1898	94	41	53
1921-1941	74	11	63
1963-1970	45	1	44

Studies of marriage patterns indicate significant changes in relationships between inhabitants of the commune and those from outside areas over the course of a century. Endogamous marriages, primarily between residents of Revest or the Plateau d’Albion, were gradually replaced by exogamous marriages involving spouses from more than 30 kilometers away. Until 1940, marriage networks largely coincided with the local economic zone of the plateau. After the Second World War, this framework broadened with the influx of labor associated with the construction of the base infrastructure and missile silos.

==== Air base 200 Apt–Saint-Christol ====
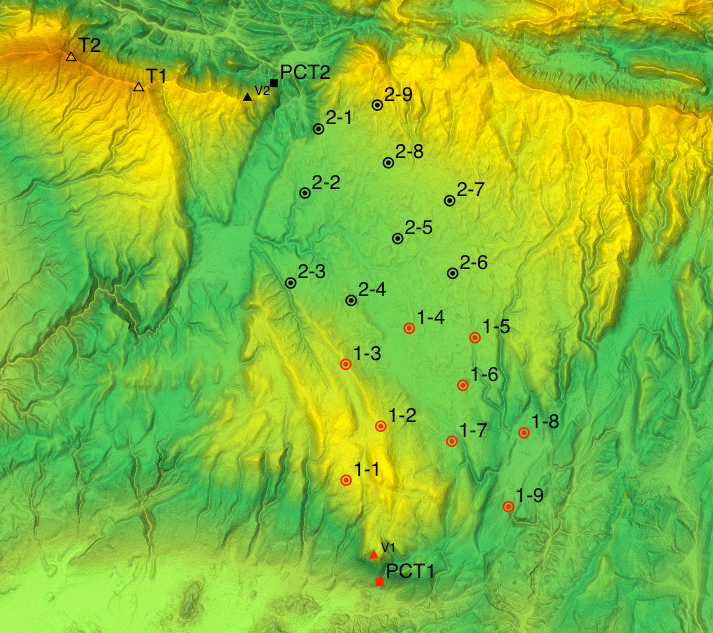
Topographic map of the Albion plateau and locations of the 18 former launch sites

From 1971 to 1996, the Plateau d’Albion hosted nuclear missile installations that formed part of France’s strategic deterrence force. The site included eighteen missile silos and two firing control centers, which were later dismantled. The former Air Base 200, which supported the installations, is now used by the 2nd Foreign Engineer Regiment of the French Foreign Legion and houses a listening station of the DGSE.

== Housing ==
=== Hilltop housing ===
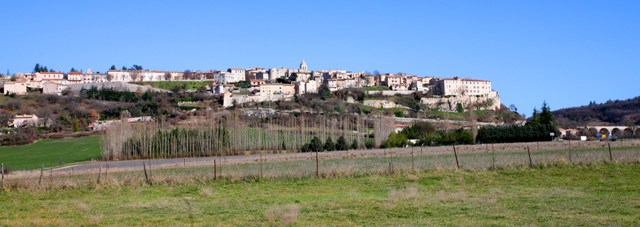
Sault.

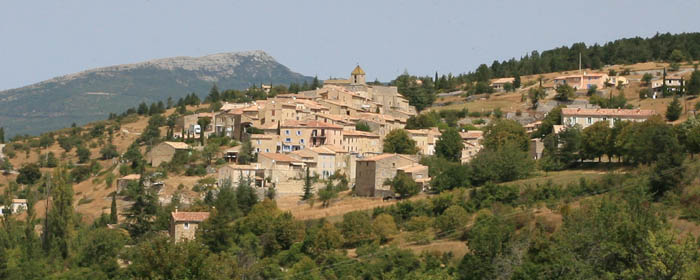
Aurel.

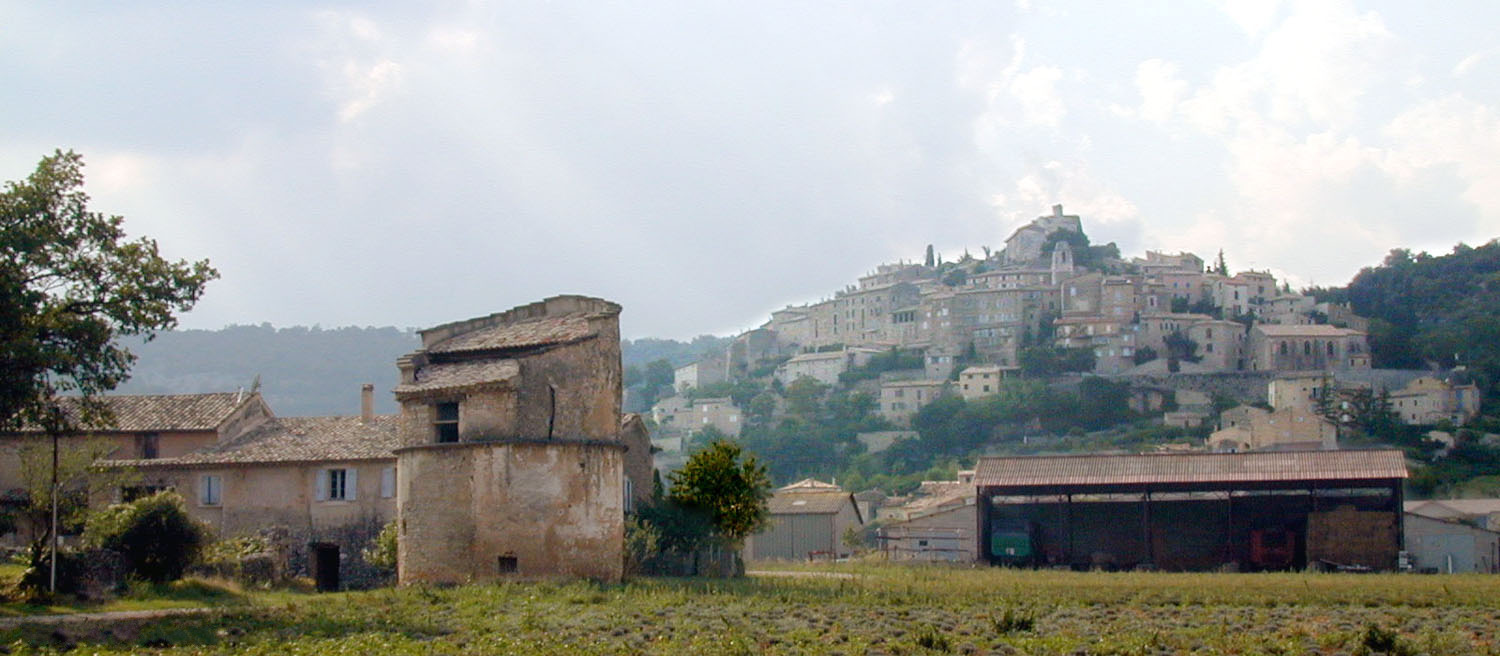
Simiane-la-Rotonde.

This type of housing is characteristic of the Mediterranean region. Villages built on elevated rocky sites, often preserving their medieval layout, display façades oriented toward valleys or communication routes, creating a form of linear fortification.

Fernand Benoit highlights the possible prehistoric origins of these sites, noting that Cicero referred to the Ligurians of the region as castellani, or inhabitants of castellas (Brutus, LXXIII, 256).

These perched villages are mainly located in hilly areas with poor alluvial soils and limited water resources. In contrast, the lower Rhône Valley and the Durance Valley are characterized by fertile alluvial soils and easier access to water, often through wells dug within house courtyards.

This clustering of housing into compact communities is characteristic of regions with smallholdings, where fertile land is limited to valley bottoms. Such concentration also supported the development of rural crafts necessary to village life, such as wheelwrighting and blacksmithing. In contrast, dispersed housing is generally associated with large estates operating in relative self-sufficiency. Historian Fernand Benoit summarized this dynamic with the maxim: “Poverty groups housing together, affluence disperses it.”

=== House on height ===
Fernand Benoit described this type of dwelling as distinctive for placing animals on the lower level and people above. Following a Mediterranean tradition, the building combines both functions under one roof: the ground floor served as a stable and storage area, the upper floors as living quarters, and the attic as additional storage. This form of housing, common in villages, was typically used by peasants with limited livestock, as the confined space could not accommodate larger animals such as horses and teams.

This type of dwelling is still present in various mountain ranges and plateaus of western Provence.

Most examples date from the 16th century, when the Wars of Religion encouraged residence within fortified villages. After the conflicts, settlement gradually expanded outward, leading to the construction of ground-level houses on the outskirts, which were better adapted to accommodate annex buildings.

This type of dwelling, which housed both people and animals within a village, was fixed in place, with expansion possible only upward. Its characteristic architecture included a narrow façade with one or two windows and a height of up to four or five stories, including the attic, often equipped with an exterior pulley for hoisting fodder. Since these houses have lost their agricultural function, common modifications include converting the ground floor into a garage and creating additional rooms in the attic. In restored examples, access to the main living floor is often still provided by an external staircase attached to the façade.

A terrace or balcony was a common feature of these houses, primarily used for drying fruits and vegetables. When covered with a vine trellis forming a rustic pergola, it was known as a trihard. When arranged as a loggia, with small columns supporting a tiled awning, it was referred to as a galarié or souleriè.

=== House on the ground ===
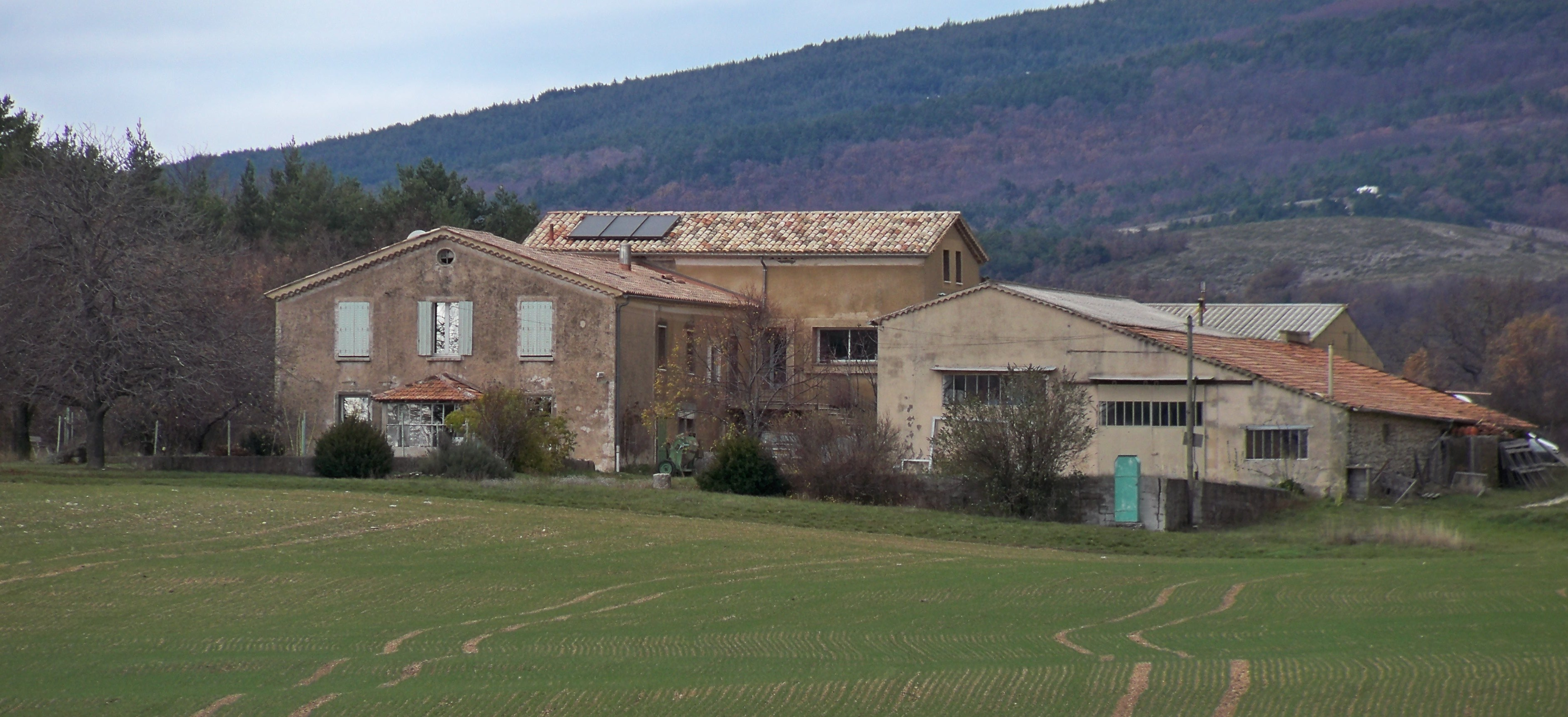
In Revest-du-Bion, a house on the outskirts of the village near Notre-Dame de l'Ortiguière.

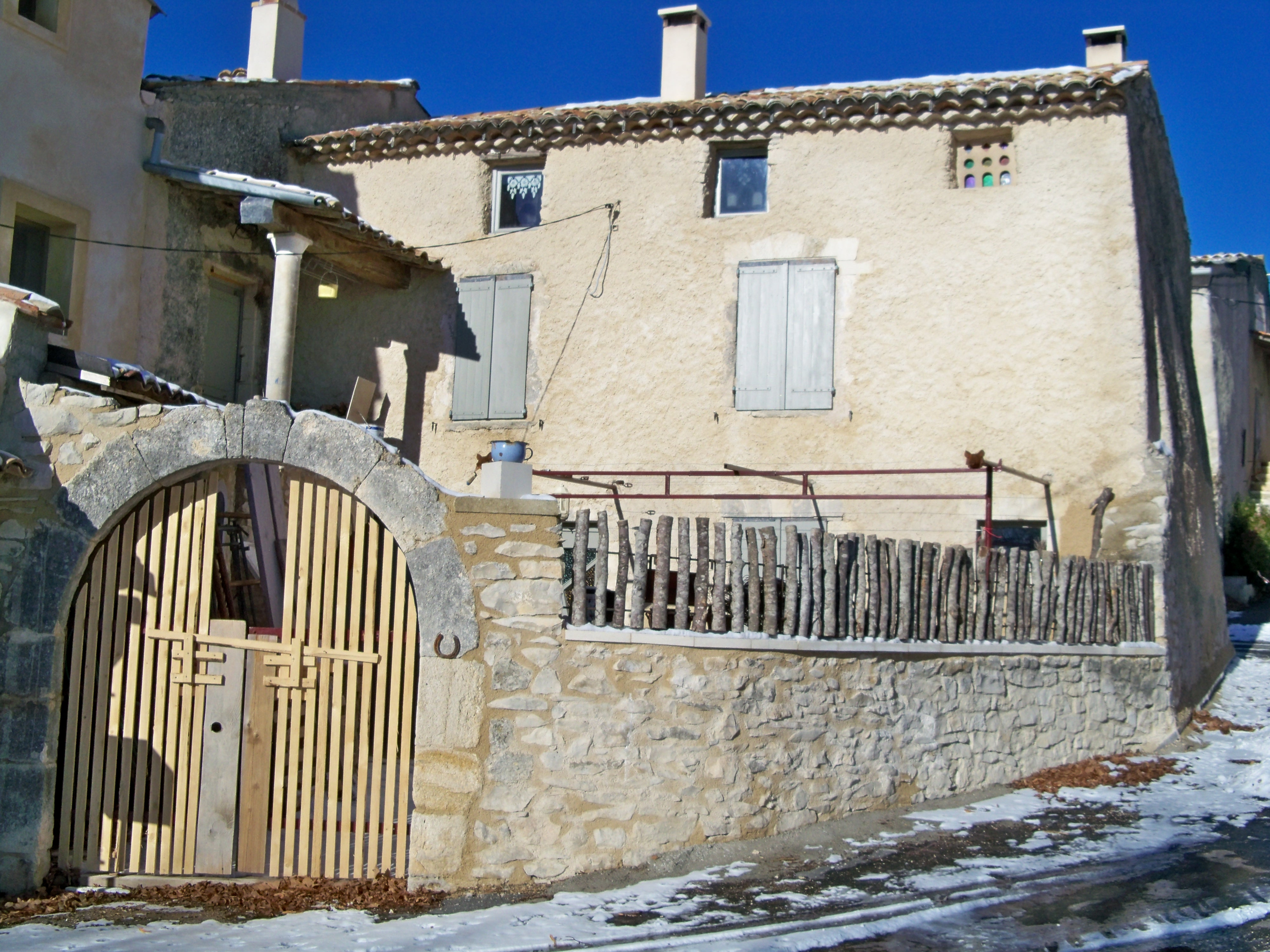
On the edge of Ferrassières, a house on high ground converted into a house on the ground with the addition of a dovecote.

Divided lengthwise, this type of house represents a later stage of development compared to the “house on height” and is characteristic of dispersed settlements. It is the traditional dwelling associated with areas of intensive cultivation, including regions devoted to lavender.

This type of house is divided lengthwise into two distinct sections. The first section, on the ground floor, contains a common room with an integrated kitchen, often accompanied at the back by a cellar for wine storage and a bedroom. A narrow corridor provides access to the upper floor and separates this part from the second section, reserved for animals. This latter section generally includes a storage area that may serve as a stable and cowshed. The upper floor is typically used for bedrooms and the hayloft, which is connected to the stable and cowshed by a chute.

Additional annexes were often added to this type of dwelling. Common examples included a pigeon tower, as well as structures such as a pigsty, rabbit hutch, henhouse, and sheepfold.

Unlike houses built on height, which did not include latrines even in urban settings, houses on the ground allowed for the installation of latrines outside the dwelling. Until the mid-20th century, these typically consisted of simple plank shelters covered with reeds, with waste evacuated directly to a manure pit or dung heap.

The construction of such dwellings generally took place over an extended period and followed no fixed architectural plan. Each owner adapted the building according to individual needs and priorities, resulting in heterogeneous layouts where the roofs of different structures often overlapped in a staggered manner.

Rural houses in the region were often distinguished by individualized exterior layouts, though certain features were recurrent. A vine trellis was commonly installed to shade the entrance, providing protection from the sun in summer while allowing more light into the main room after the leaves fell in autumn. A well was typically located nearby, either covered by a dry-stone corbelled structure closed with a wooden door or fitted with two pillars and a lintel supporting a pulley system. Water supply was frequently supplemented by a cistern collecting rainwater from the roof. Following the French Revolution, the pigeon tower became a characteristic feature of these dwellings, symbolizing the end of seigneurial privilege, as its construction had previously been restricted to noble estates. The tower could be attached to the house or built independently. Large in size and intended to enhance the status of the dwelling, it usually rose to two stories, with the upper level reserved for pigeons. To prevent rodent intrusion, access was systematically protected with glazed tiles.

=== House with courtyard ===
This type of dwelling consists of buildings and outbuildings arranged around a central courtyard. It is characteristic of large cereal-growing estates and sometimes resembles a château, with walls flanked by turrets or corner towers. The structure is adapted to agricultural practices in regions where the climate did not require barns for storing wheat sheaves, as threshing took place immediately after cutting on an earthen threshing floor. In this system, grain was kept in sacks within a shed, while straw was piled outdoors, protected only by a layer of dust and clay. Fodder was the only product stored indoors.

This agrarian structure is rare in Provence.

=== House with towers ===
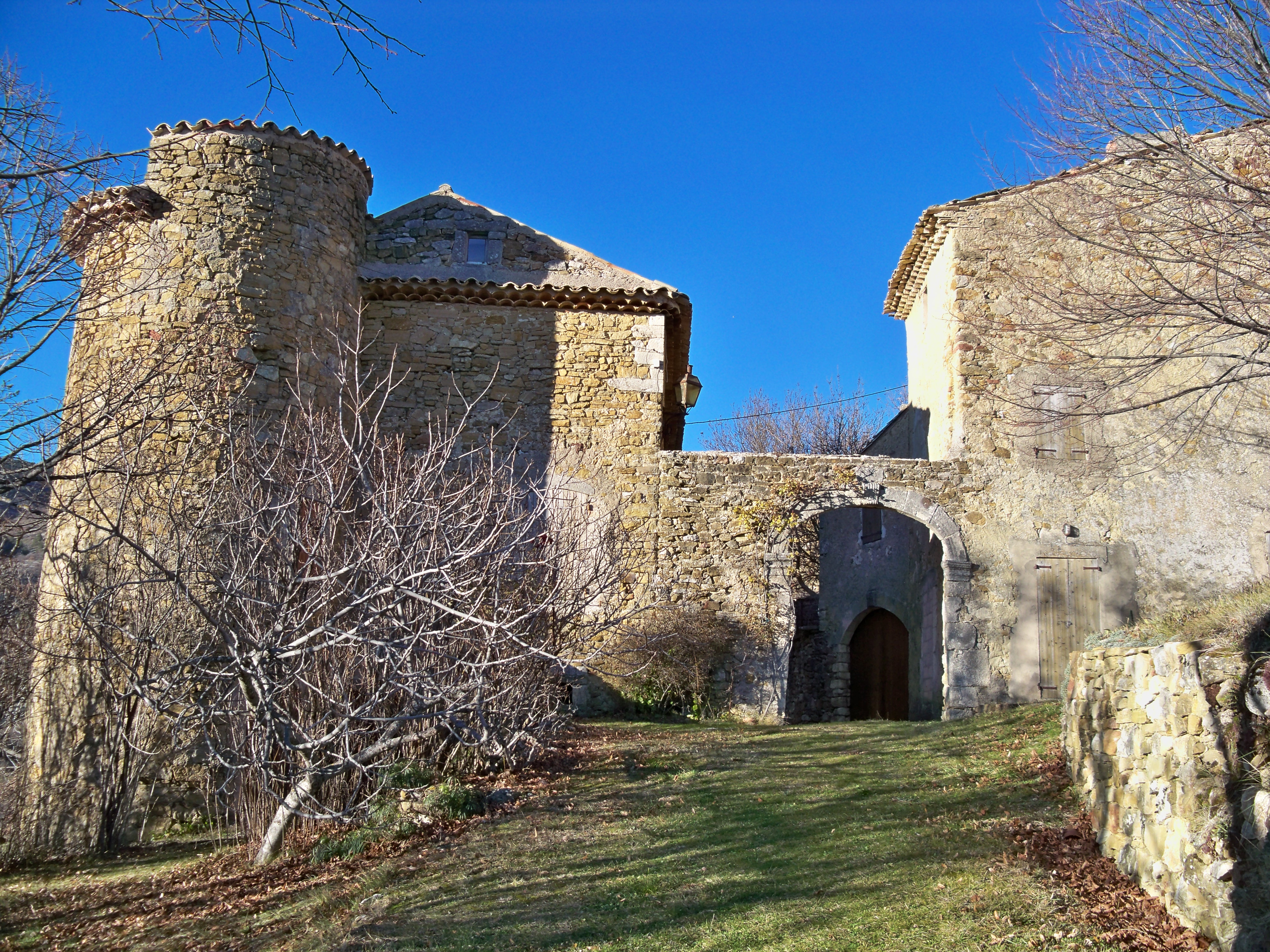
The tower in Aurel.

This architectural style characterizes large seigneurial houses that persisted for centuries, including after the Renaissance. These buildings, isolated and sometimes equipped with an inner courtyard, typically feature façades flanked by two towers or layouts reinforced by four corner towers.

The fortification of rural houses dates back to the High Middle Ages, with the castellum serving as an early example, particularly in Provence, where plans with corner towers were common. This tradition has Roman origins, as many villæ rusticæ were also protected by towers.

=== Cabanon ===
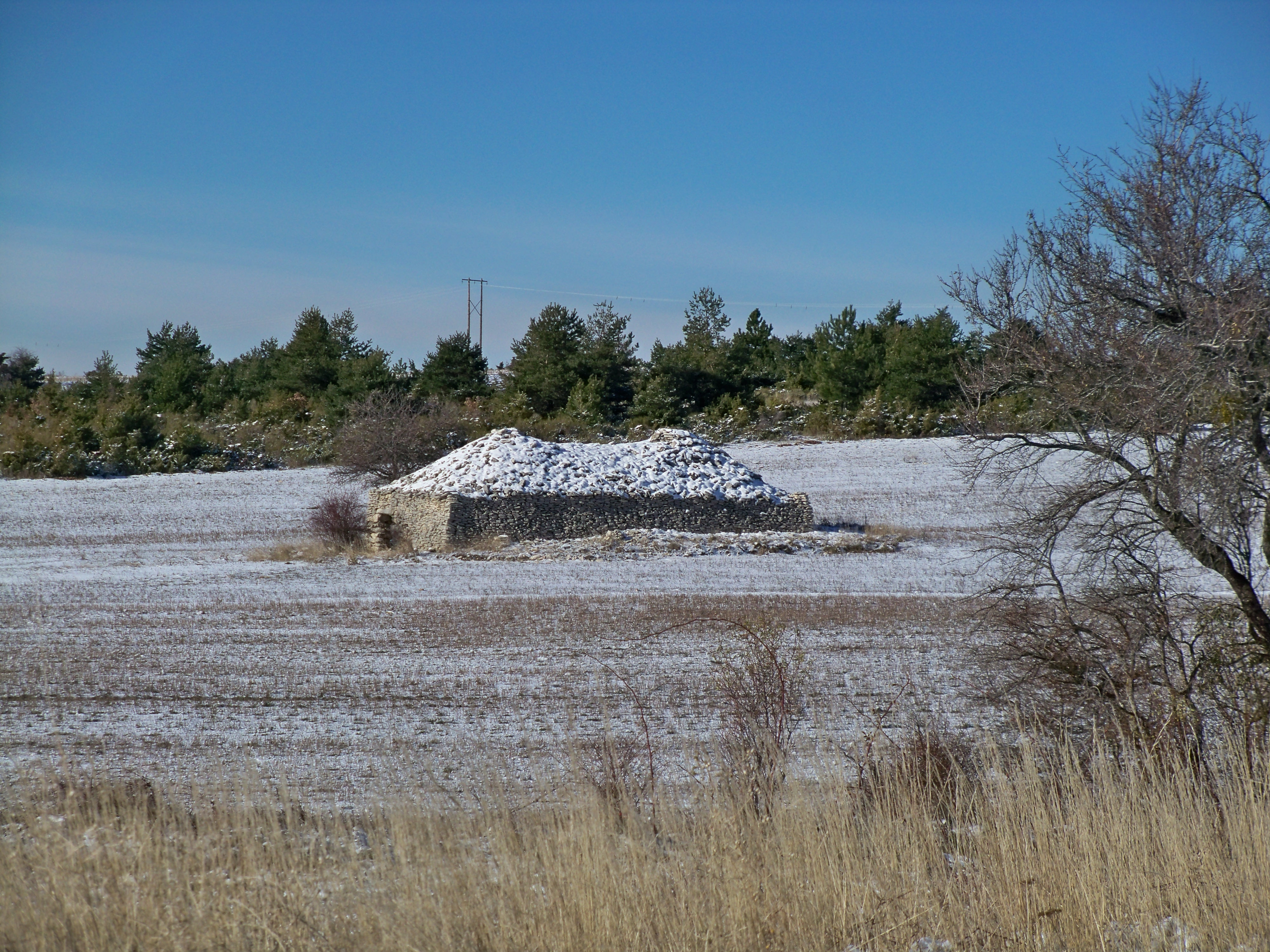
Double-roofed sheepfold in the municipality of Ferrassières.

The “small house in the fields” is associated with agricultural activity that required peasants to remain away from their primary residence. In his study of rural housing, Fernand Benoit distinguished between pastoralism and sedentary farming. In the case of pastoralism, transhumance, which involved moving flocks to alpine pastures during summer, necessitated the use of simple on-site housing for shepherds. Depending on the location, this could take the form of a dry-stone jas or a hut built with mixed materials, serving both as a shelter and as a dairy.

For sedentary peasants, the distance from their fields often required the construction of a dwelling near the cultivated plots. In this context, the cabanon functioned as a seasonal residence, used during extended periods of agricultural work.

These structures, located either at the edge or in the center of the fields, also served as markers of land ownership, distinguishing private property from communal land.

=== Borie ===
In Provence, a dry-stone hut is known as a borie, from the Latin boria and spelled bori in Provençal. In the Provençal Alps, particularly around Forcalquier, it is also referred to as a cabanon pointu. Built entirely from dry stone, the borie served as an annex to the main dwelling, used for storing agricultural tools, protecting harvests or water reserves, and occasionally providing shelter. This form of construction was made possible by the clearing of stones from cultivated fields and is commonly found in mountainous areas, dry plateaus, and terraced hillsides (restanques).

== Economic activities ==
The plateau, known for its lavender cultivation, has an economy primarily based on agriculture—including honey production, spelt and other cereals, as well as goat and sheep farming—and tourism activities such as camping, hiking, mountain biking, caving, and lavender-related routes.

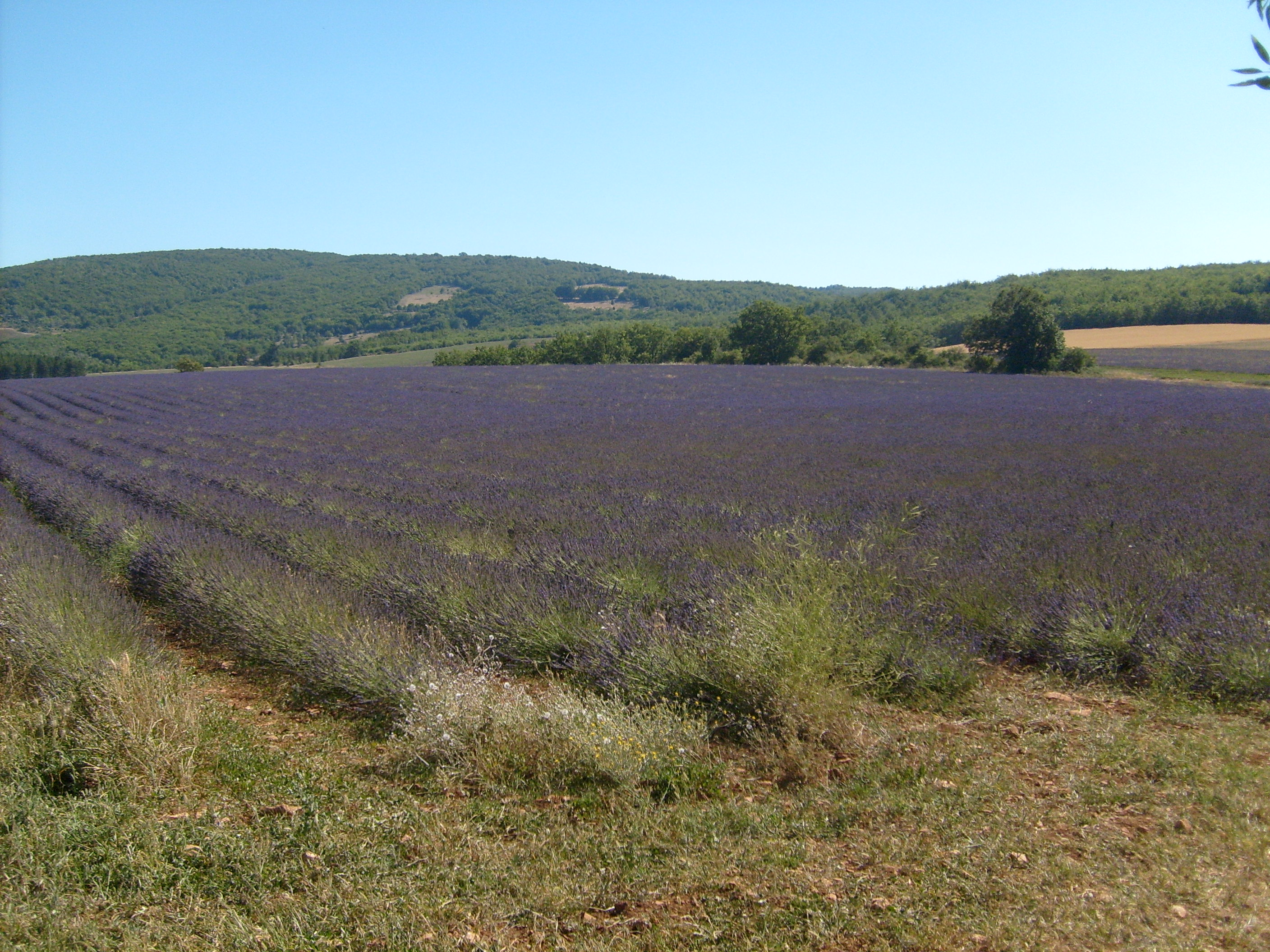
Lavender field on the Albion plateau.

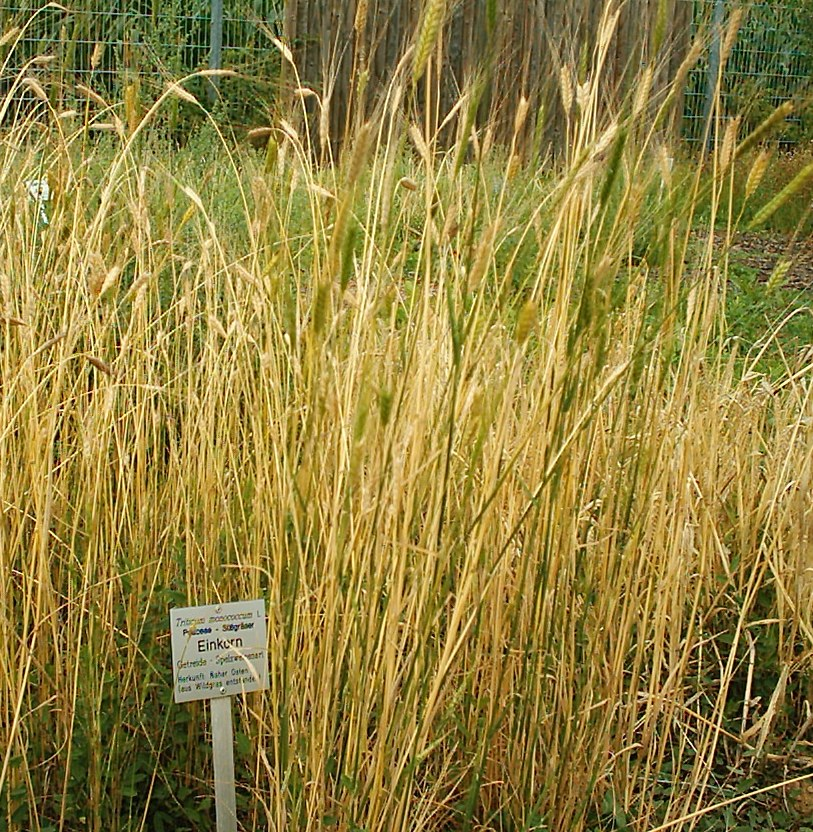
Einkorn wheat on the Albion plateau.

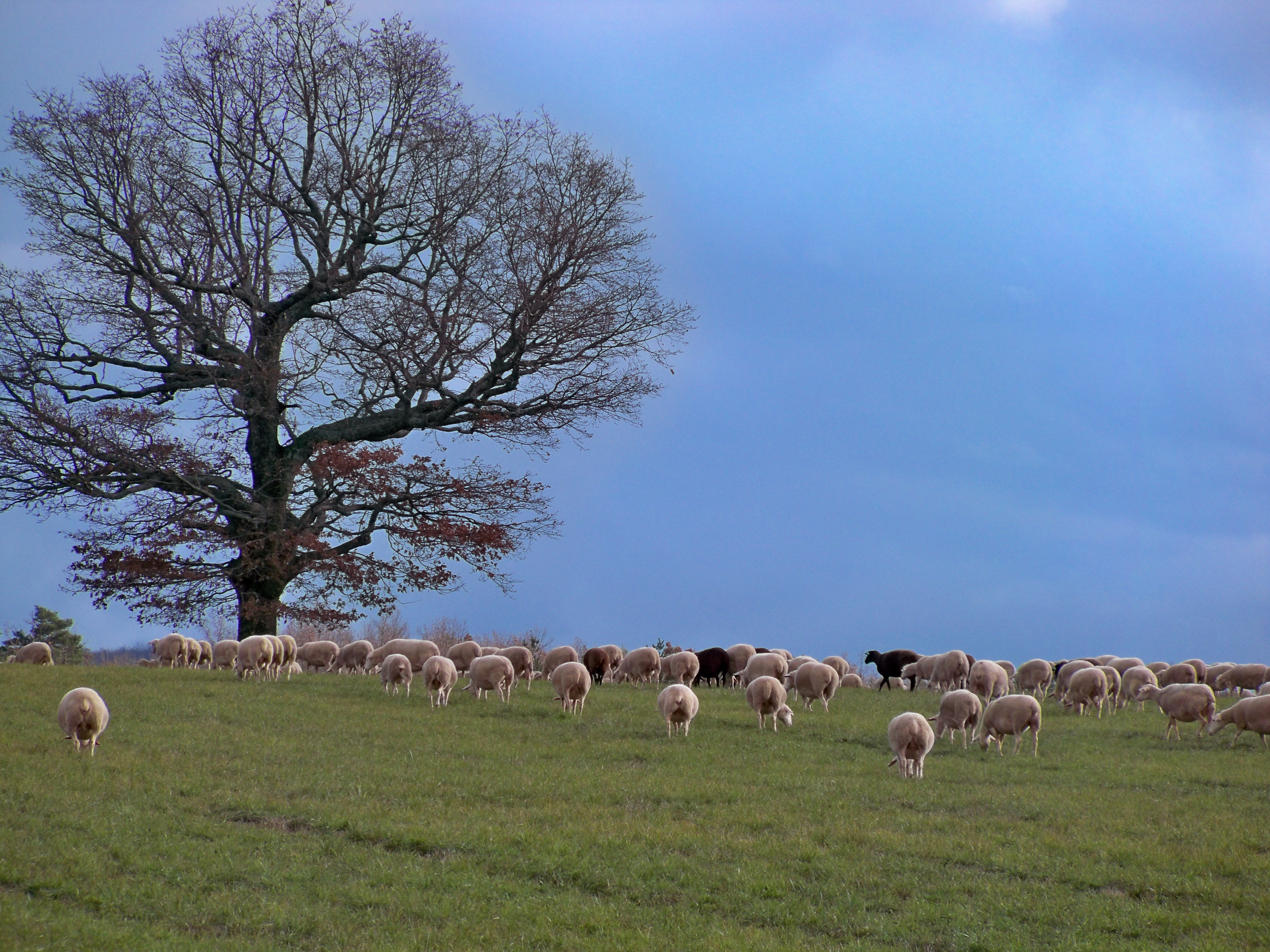
Sheep herd near Revest-du-Bion.

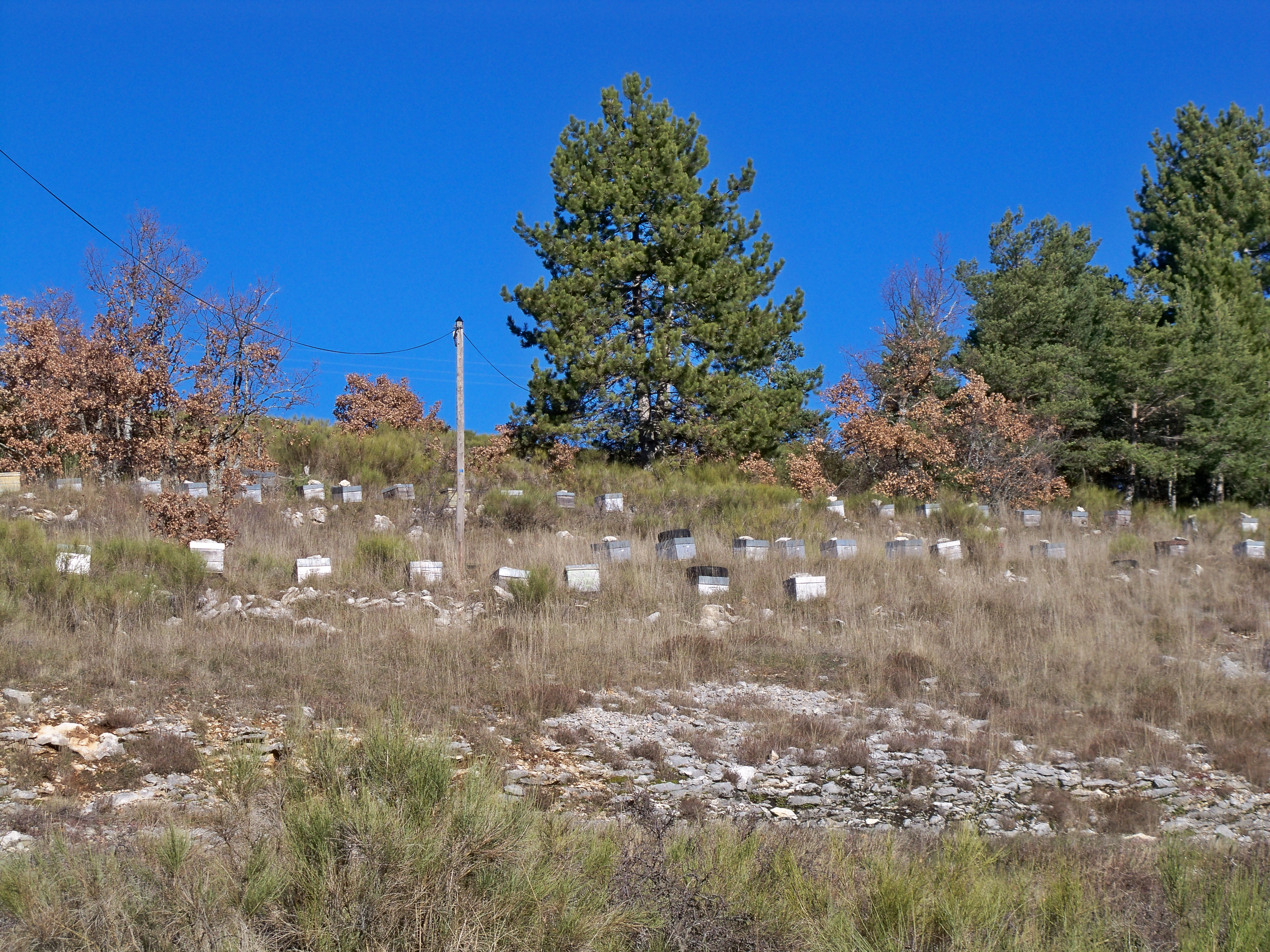
Beehives at Combe du Pommier.

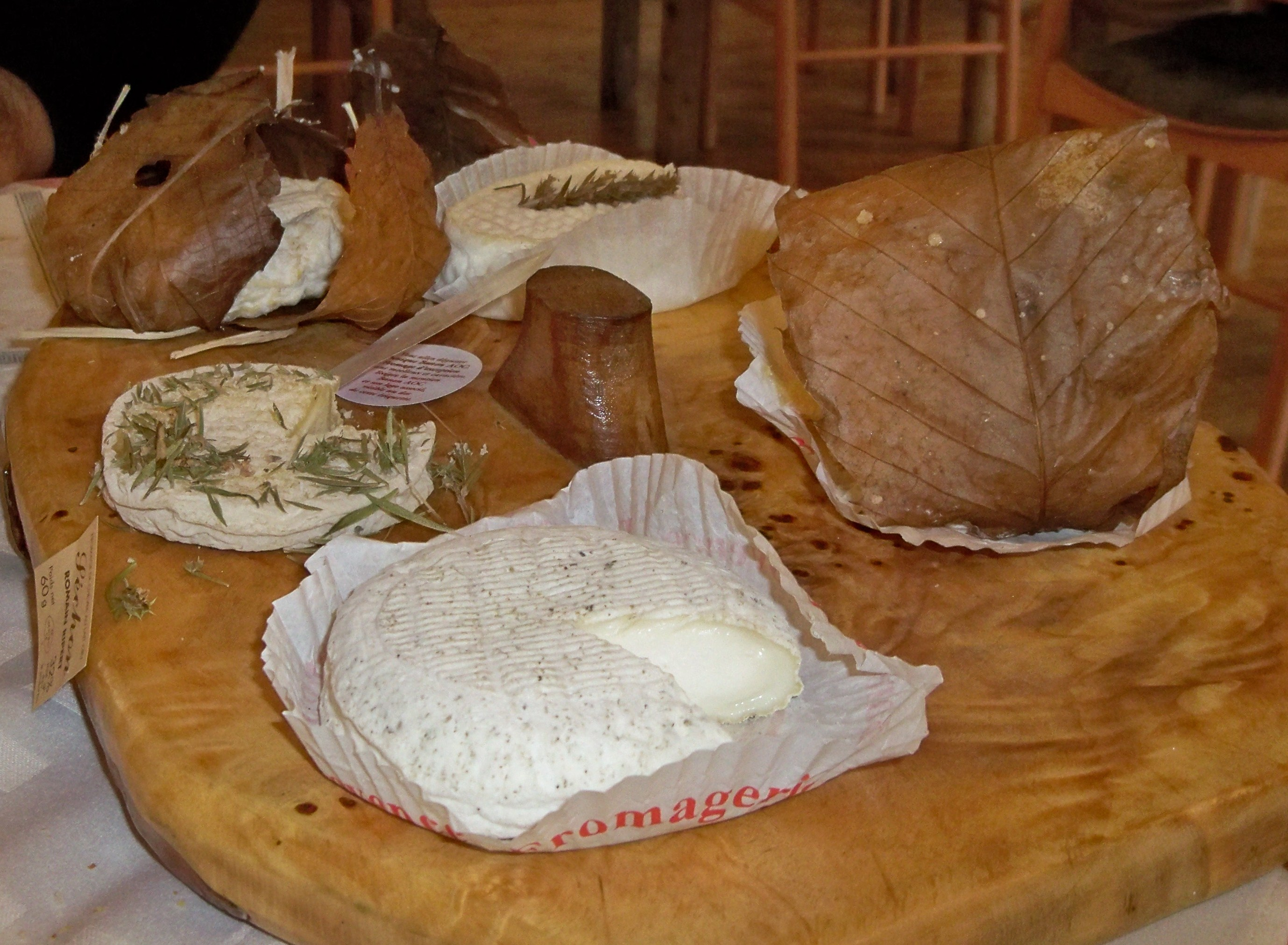
Platter of AOC Banon cheese in a restaurant in Revest-du-Bion.

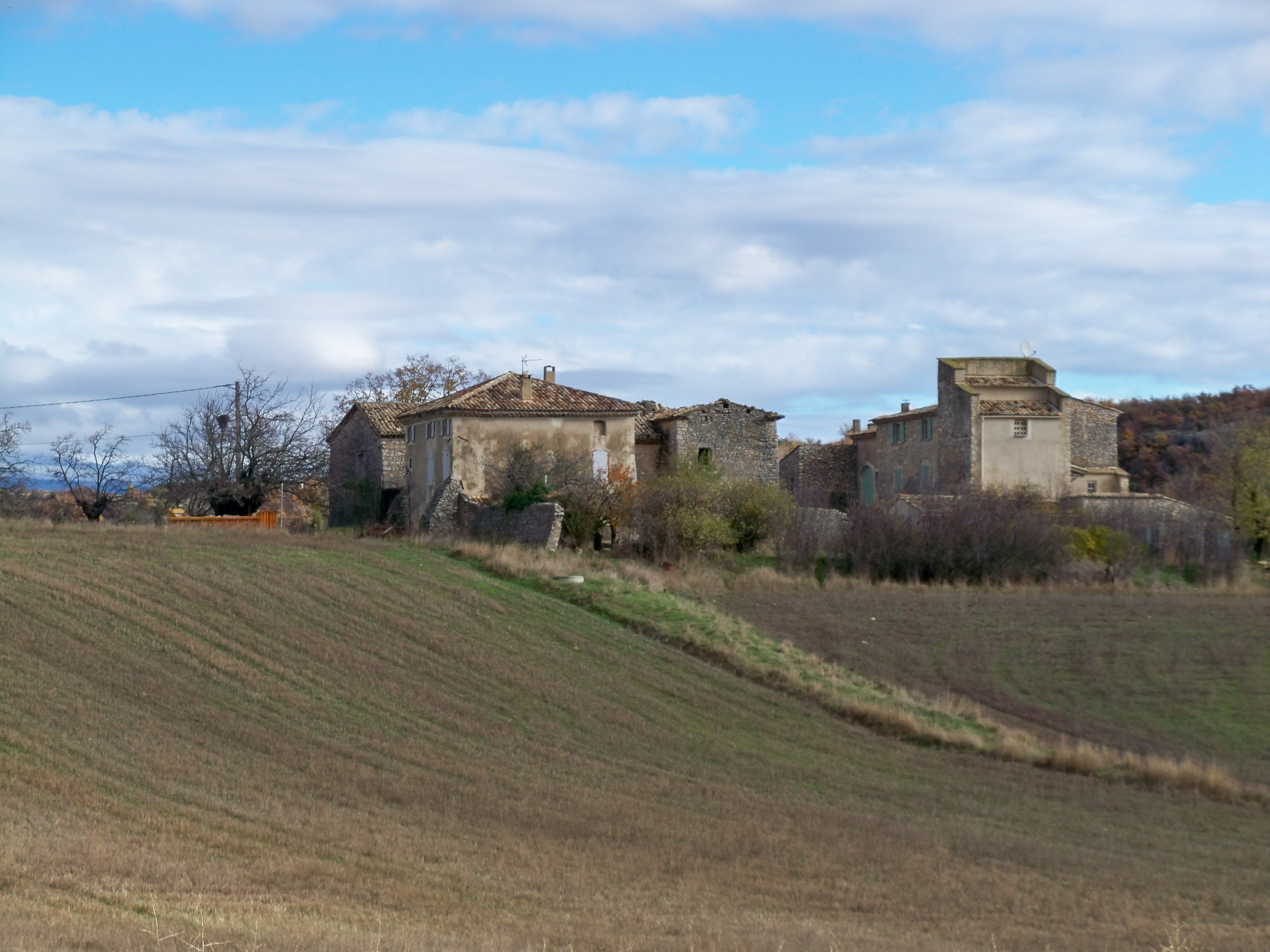
House on the ground in Simiane with its dovecote.

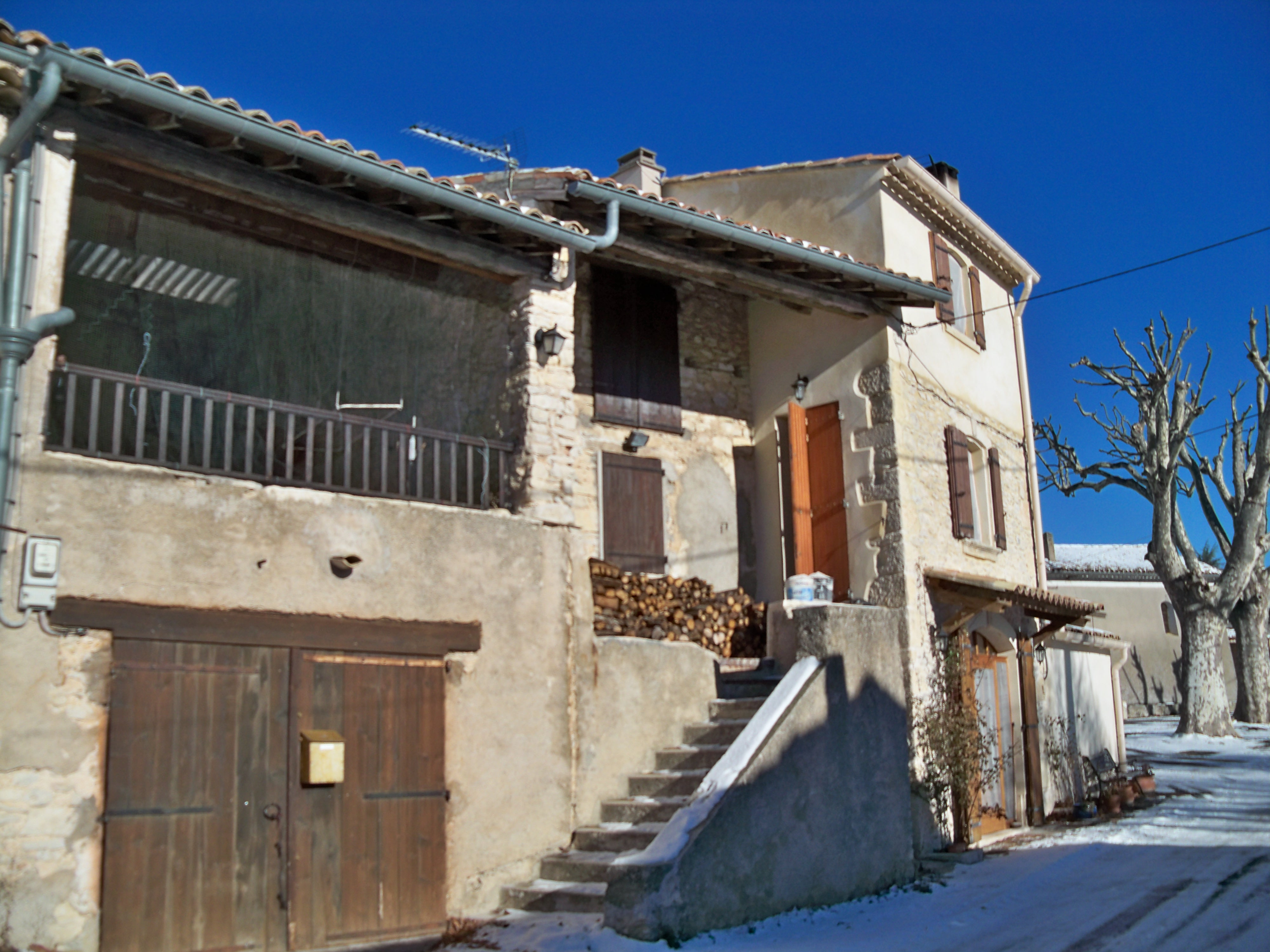
In Ferrassières, a house on high ground with a loggia, calabert, (Note: The calabert is a shelter used to store firewood.) and pontin.

=== Lavender ===
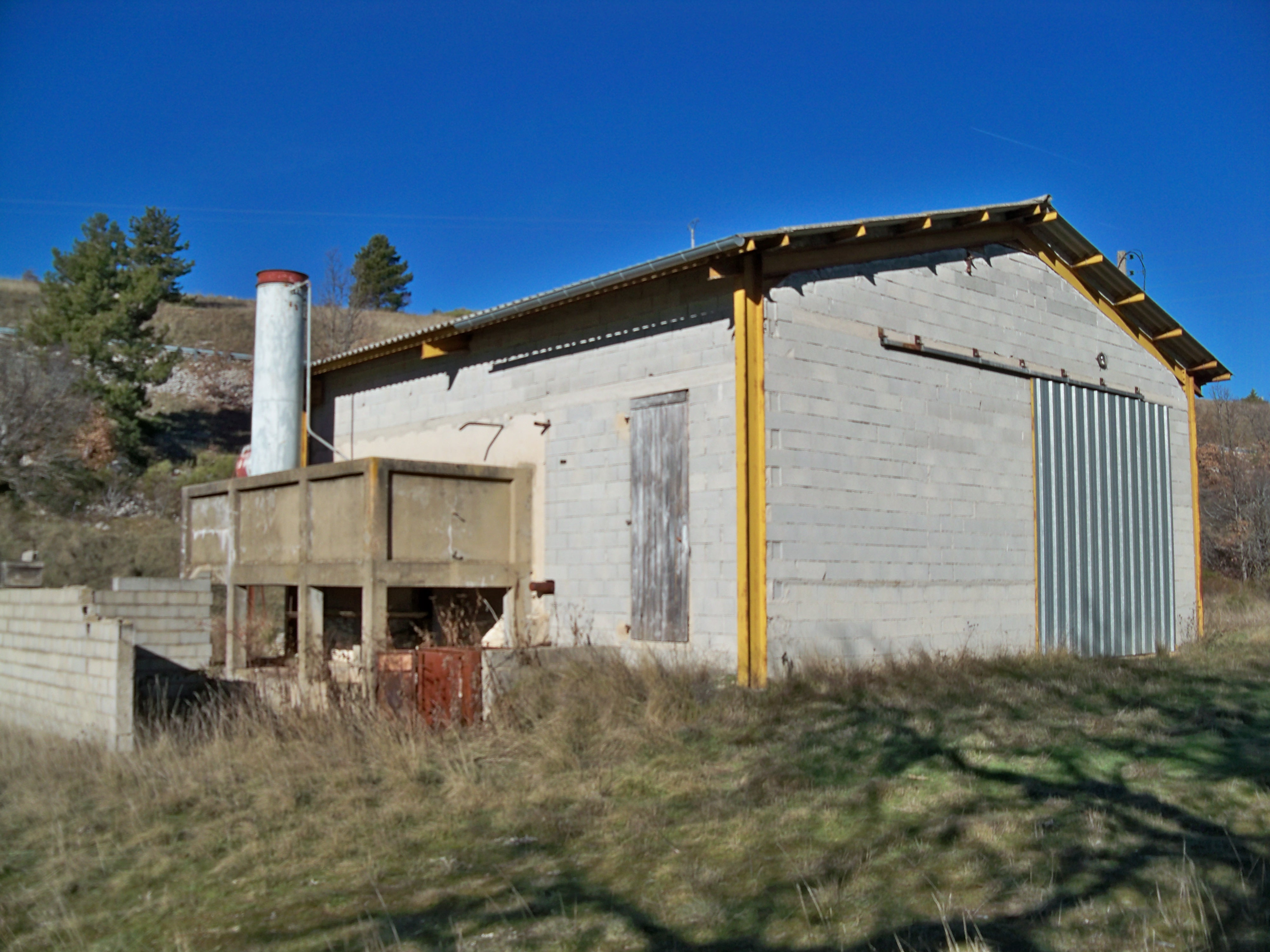
Combe du Pommier Distillery.

Lavender, often associated with sunshine and holidays and described by Jean Giono as “the soul of Haute-Provence,” has long been cultivated in the region of Ventoux, the Baronnies, and the Lure mountain. (Note: Barruol, Dautier & Mondon 2007, p. 124) Traditionally gathered in the wild for centuries, its organized harvest began in the 16th century alongside the development of flower distillation. (Note: Barruol, Dautier & Mondon 2007, p. 125) The crop experienced its peak in the early 20th century, with widespread planting in the 1920s. After declines following the 1929 economic crisis and the Second World War, demand revived around 1955 but quickly entered into crisis again in the early 1960s. (Note: Barruol, Dautier & Mondon 2007, p. 126) Mechanization of harvesting, improved market organization, and the introduction of a controlled designation of origin (AOC) for “Haute-Provence lavender essential oil” in 1981 contributed to restructuring the sector. (Note: Barruol, Dautier & Mondon 2007, p. 127) Production, estimated at around 200 tons in the early 1980s, decreased to 25 tons in the 1990s before rising again to 80 tons in 2003. (Note: Barruol, Dautier & Mondon 2007, p. 128) On the Albion plateau, lavender cultivation extends over approximately 4,500 hectares.

=== Einkorn wheat ===
Einkorn is an ancient variety of wheat, with archaeological evidence tracing its cultivation back approximately 9,000 years BCE. It is adapted to poor soils and resistant to long, cold winters. (Note: Barruol, Dautier & Mondon 2007, p. 123) Typically sown in September or October, it has a growing cycle of about eleven months. The crop was widely cultivated on the Albion plateau and the slopes of Mont Ventoux until the 19th century, before declining in use. It was reintroduced in the 1980s, and within the framework of the cooperative SICAC éréales Ventoux, around fifty producers now supply a market consuming about 200 tons annually.

=== Banon cheese ===
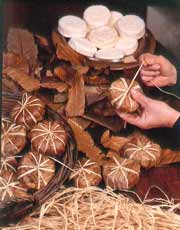
Packaging of AOC Banon cheese in brown chestnut leaves tied with a strand of natural raffia.

Banon cheese has been protected by an Appellation d’Origine Contrôlée (AOC) since 2003, becoming the first cheese of the Provence-Alpes-Côte d’Azur region to obtain this designation. The Institut National de l’Origine et de la Qualité (INAO) authorized 179 communes where milk production from Provençal, Rove, and Alpine goat breeds qualifies for the appellation. These include 111 communes in Alpes-de-Haute-Provence, 33 in Hautes-Alpes, 21 in Drôme, and 14 in Vaucluse. The seven communes of the Albion plateau are part of the production area.

It is a soft cheese with a natural rind, produced using the sweet curd technique. The curd is ladled into molds, then wrapped in brown chestnut leaves and tied with natural raffia. Prior to wrapping, the cheese is dipped in alcohol to limit mold development.

=== Goat cheese of Mont Ventoux ===
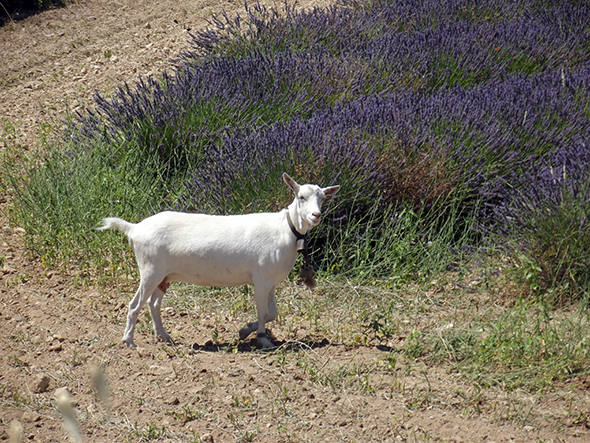
Goat and lavender.

The Mont Ventoux goat cheese is produced artisanally from the milk of Rove goats or Provence goats, at the foot of Mont Ventoux. The main producer is located near Saumane, in the Alpes-de-Haute-Provence, a commune situated between the Albion plateau and the Lure Mountain.

=== Provence honey ===
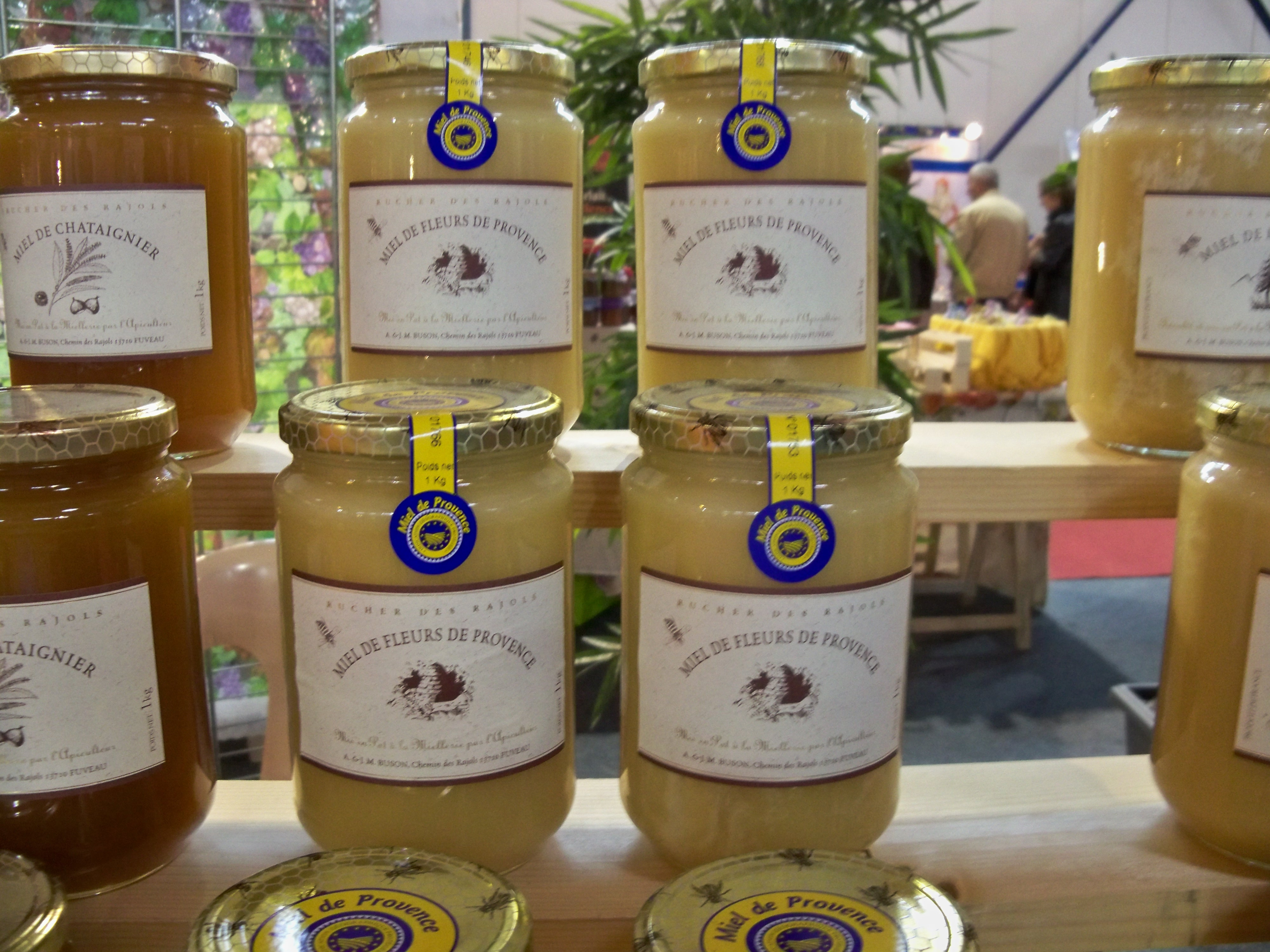
All-flower honey with protected geographical indication.

Provence honey is protected by a red label and a protected geographical indication, covering both multifloral honey and lavender or lavandin honey. The region has an estimated 4,500 beekeepers, including about 700 with 70 to 150 hives. Annual production is around 2,000 tons, representing approximately 8% of national output. Transhumance is common, with hives moved seasonally from the coast to Haute-Provence. Lavender honey is primarily produced in summer within an area bounded by Montélimar and Digne to the north, and Mont Ventoux, the Albion plateau, the Lure Mountain, the Vaucluse mountains, and the Luberon massif to the south. Multifloral honey is produced across a larger area extending between Nîmes, Montélimar, Gap, Digne, Nice, Toulon, Marseille, and Avignon.

=== Sisteron lamb ===
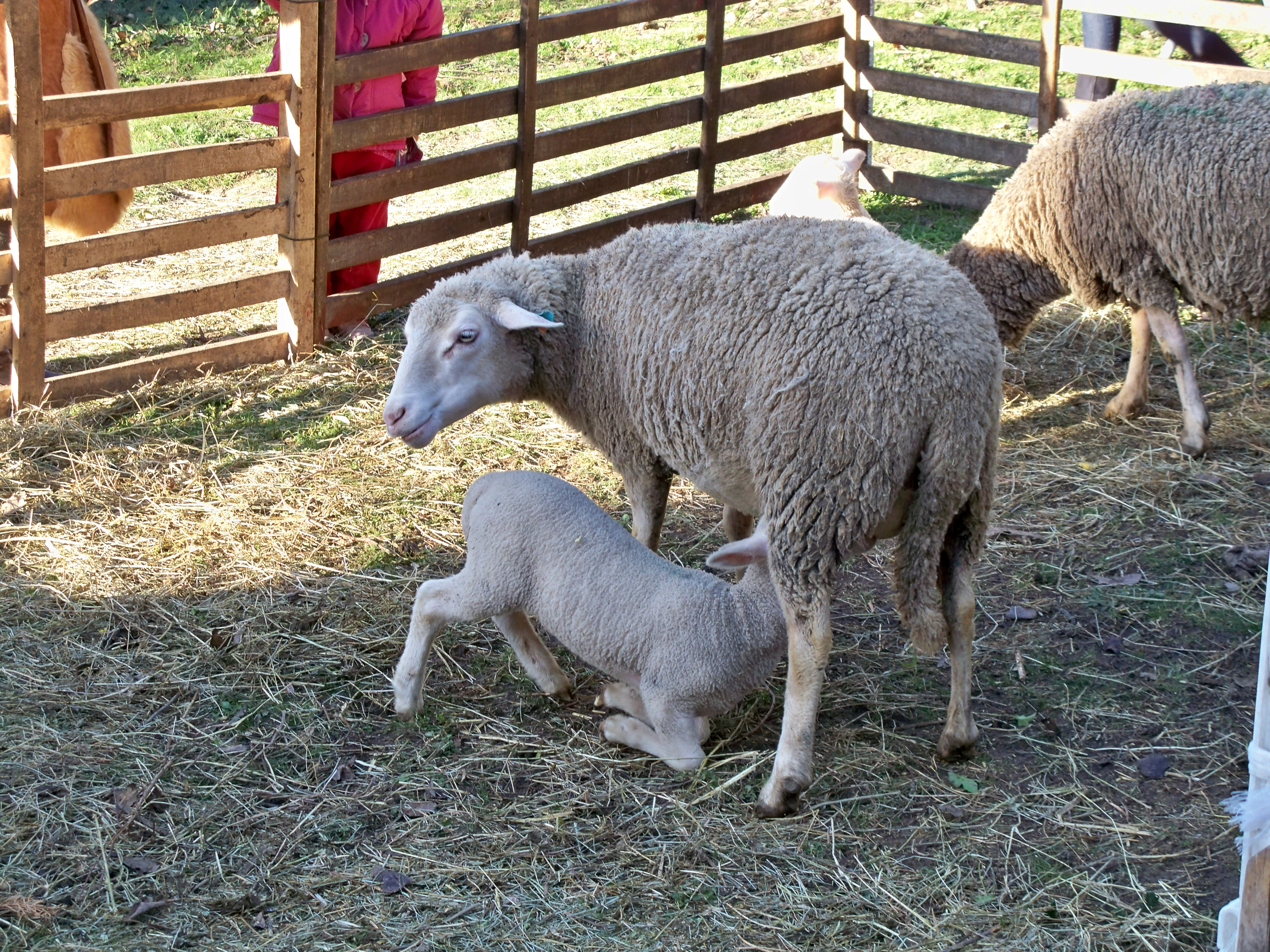
Sisteron lamb raised under its mother.

Sisteron lamb is a regional product originating from the Provençal Alps and Drôme Provençale. It is raised on traditional farms, primarily from ewes of the Mérinos d’Arles, Mourérous, or Southern Prealps breeds, which nurse the lambs for at least two months. Production follows specific conditions, including low stocking density and the use of extensive pastureland. The product has held a French red label since 2005 and has been protected by a European Union geographical indication since 2007.

This requirement ended the practice of marketing animals raised under similar conditions but originating from other regions, including Provence, the Massif Central, and Piedmont. Each year, nearly 400,000 animals passed through the Sisteron slaughterhouses, benefiting from a lack of strict controls to claim this designation.

=== Ventoux pork ===
Ventoux pork is a quality label established in 1998 for outdoor pig farming in the Mont Ventoux area. The production zone is located on the eastern side of Sault, within a 50 km area of the Vaucluse mountains south of Mont Ventoux, at an altitude of 800 to 1,000 metres. The pigs are raised outdoors with pasture space of about 100 to 110 m² per animal. Their diet consists of more than 70% cereals, supplemented with legumes. The use of growth-promoting substances or animal-based products is prohibited by the sector’s production charter.

=== Tourism ===
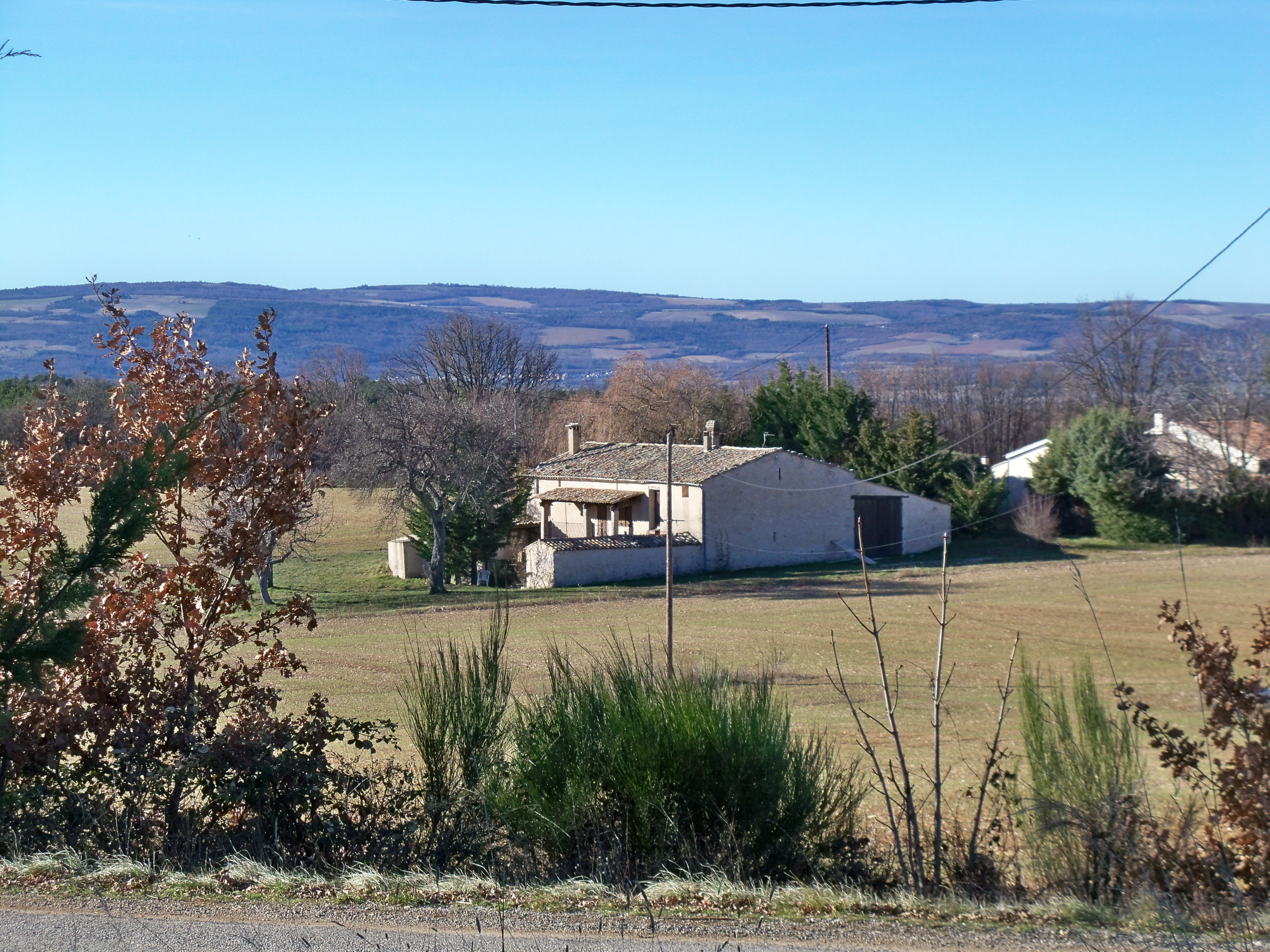
Rural cottage on the plateau.

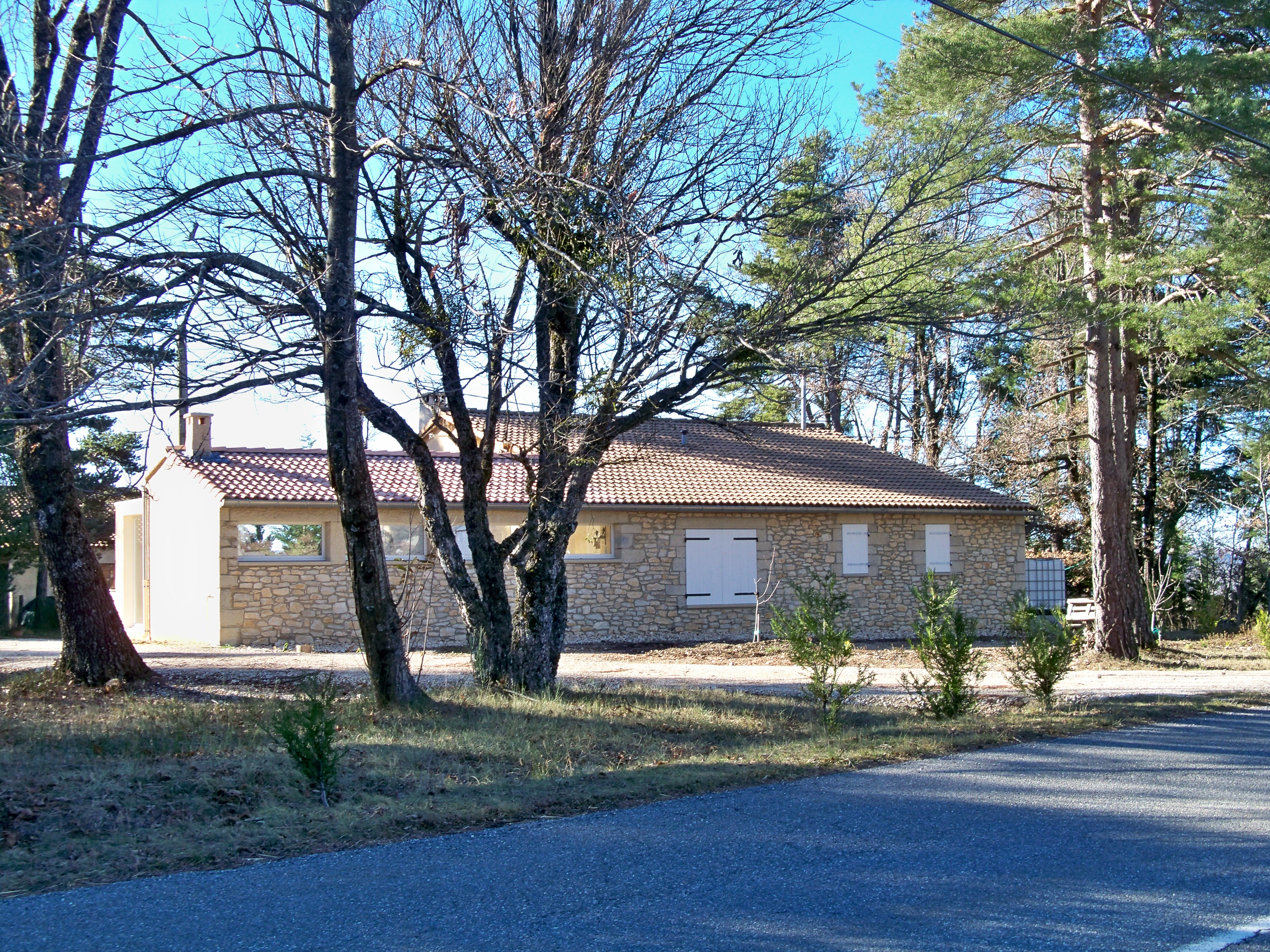
Rural cottage in Le Revest-du-Bion.

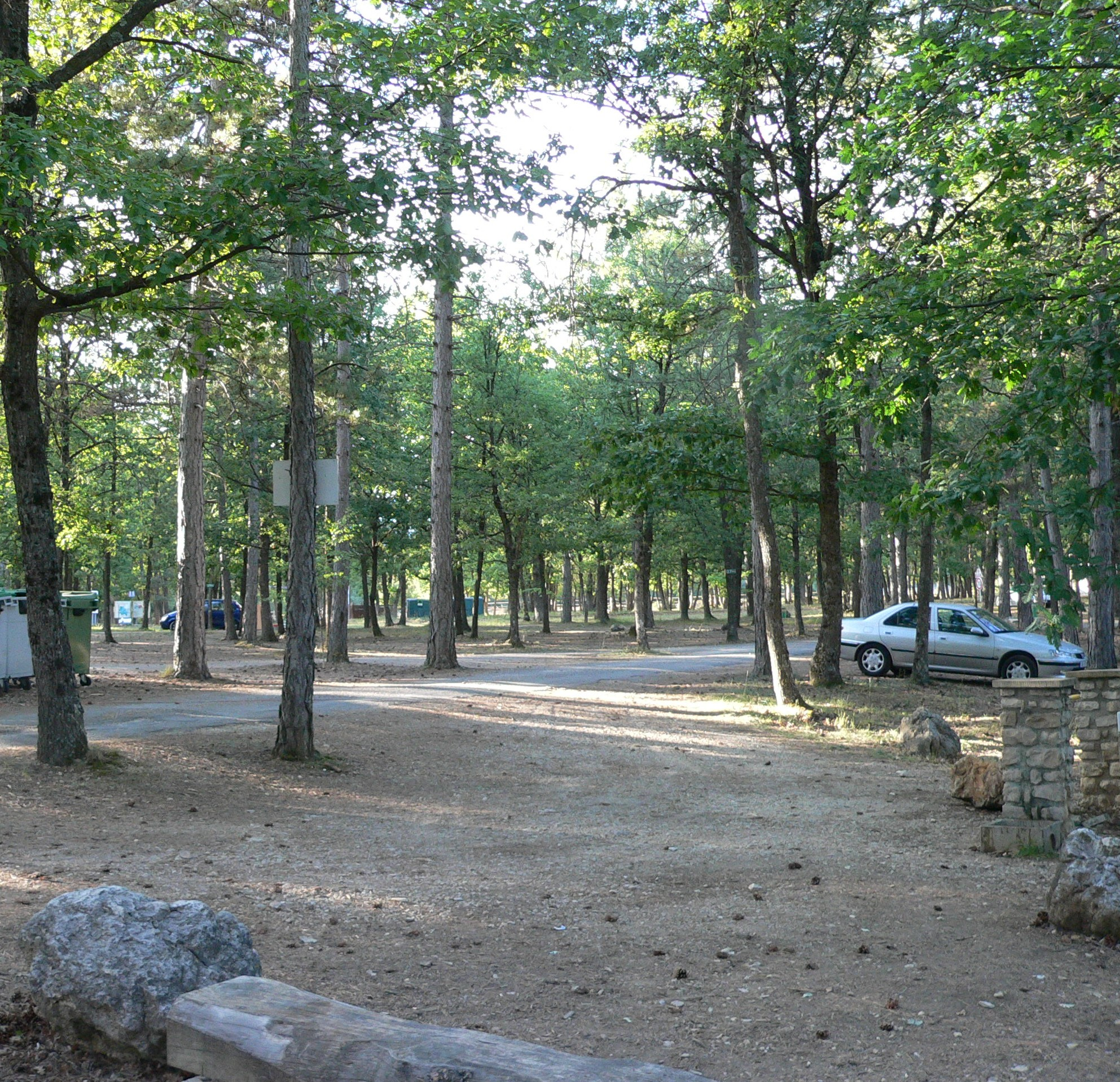
Sault Campground.

Two main factors have contributed to the development of tourism on the plateau: the cultivation of aromatic plants, particularly lavender, and speleology.

In the early 2000s, an Australian newspaper described the lavender plateaus of Haute-Provence as among the ten essential sites to visit worldwide. The region’s landscape has been shaped by dry farming practices, particularly the cultivation of lavender, lavandin, and clary sage. Lavender and lavandin bloom from mid- to late June, reaching their peak in early July. These crops form the basis of tourist routes, often promoted as scenic and aromatic itineraries, which can be explored on foot or by bicycle from nearby accommodations.

The village of Saint-Christol serves as a base for speleological activities, offering accommodation and access to exploration sites. Its location between Montagne de Lure, Mont Ventoux, and the Nesque gorges, areas classified as UNESCO Biosphere Reserves, makes it a significant starting point for such activities.

== Renewable energy ==
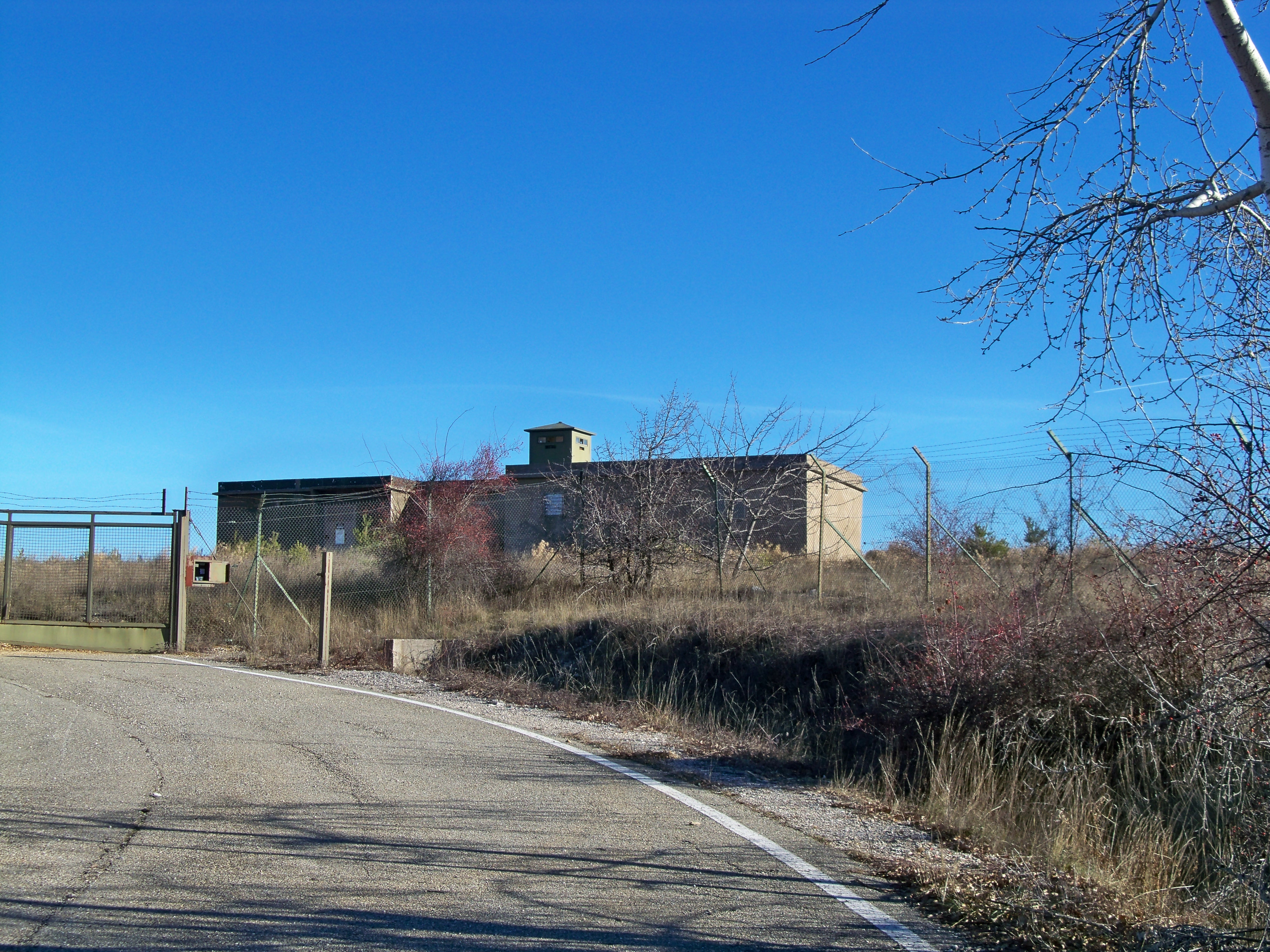
Preserved exterior building that housed nuclear missile maintenance personnel.

The first photovoltaic solar power plant on the Albion Plateau was established on a former missile launch site in the commune of Sault. The site, decommissioned in 1996 and dismantled between 1997 and 1999, originally included a cylindrical steel and concrete silo 30 metres deep, covered by a 9-metre-thick slab. The silo was filled with gravel, while the exterior building and perimeter fence were retained and adapted for the operation of the solar facility. The plant is located on the former Launch Zone 2-2.

The construction and operation of the facility were entrusted to AES Solaire France, a company specializing in photovoltaic projects. Covering three hectares, the plant has a capacity of 1.2 MWp, with 16,400 panels installed at a cost of about 5 million euros. It began commercial operation in December 2009, supplying electricity for approximately 600 households. The electricity is sold to Électricité de France (EDF) under a twenty-year contract.

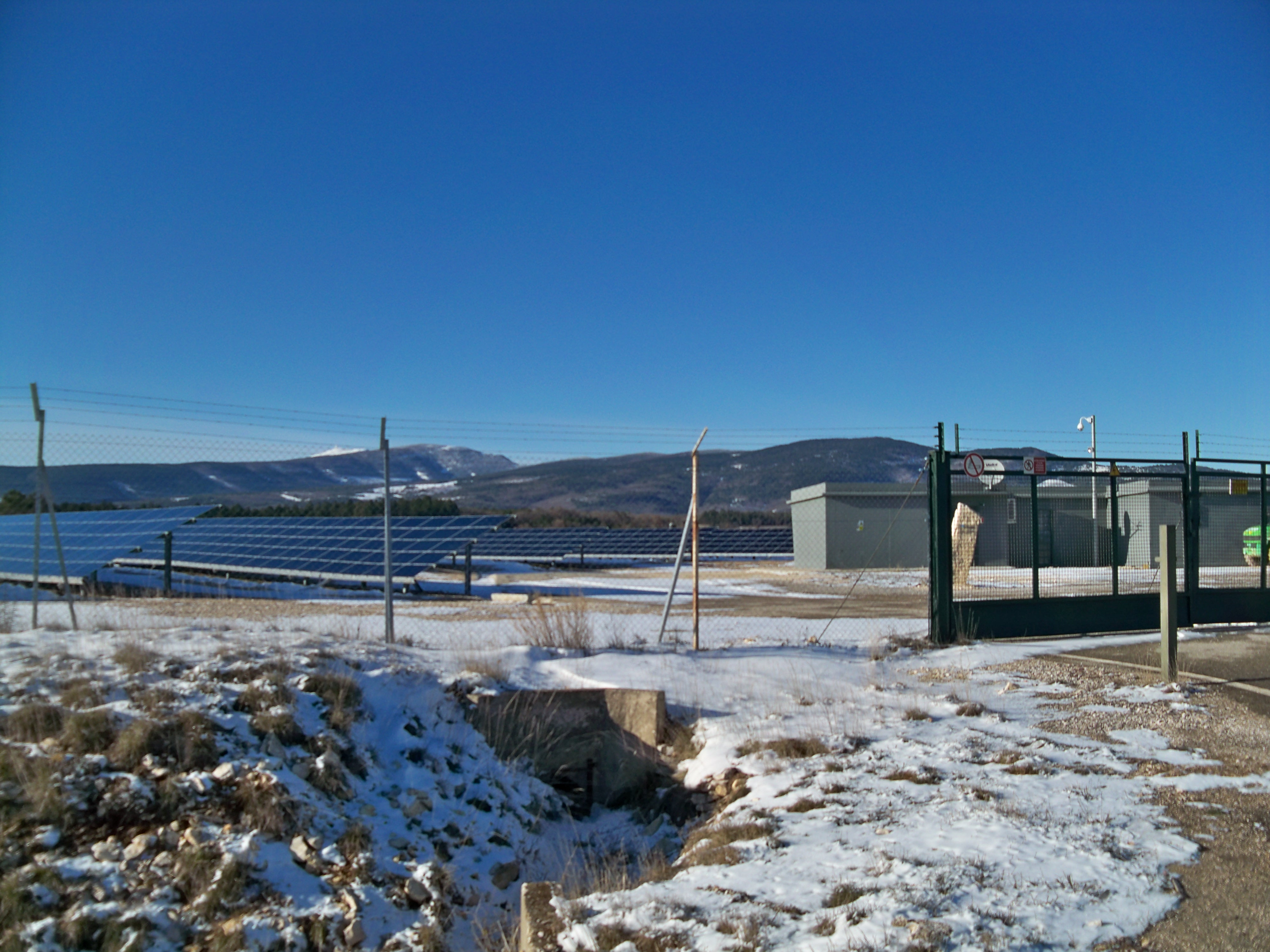
Launch area (ZL 2-2) converted into a power plant with photovoltaic panels.

The plant was officially inaugurated on 17 June 2010 in the presence of the mayor of Sault, André Faraud. He recalled that the site had been purchased by a farmer in the late 1990s and leased in 2008 to an operator for the installation of a photovoltaic power plant. The electricity produced by the panels is transferred to a power station located in the former military buildings, which is equipped with an inverter and a transformer. At this stage, the low-voltage direct current generated by the panels is converted into medium-voltage alternating current. The electricity is then delivered to the nearby Électricité de France (EDF) line through an on-site delivery station equipped with a meter. The plant is also fitted with two weather stations and operates autonomously, with remote computer monitoring and on-site surveillance provided by 18 cameras.

Since December 2009, the solar plant has produced an average of 3,000 kWh per household per year, avoiding an estimated 11,000 tons of CO₂ emissions. The installation uses First Solar thin-film panels connected by 32 kilometres of cables. Developed by AES Solaire France, based in Aix-en-Provence, it was the company’s first operational project.

Eco Delta Développement (EDD) obtained a permit from the commune of Revest-du-Bion to build a photovoltaic park on a former missile launch site. The facility, with a capacity of 1.2 MWp, consists of 4,000 panels covering 3 hectares. The project required an investment of 4.5 million euros. Construction began in January 2010, and the plant was commissioned in spring 2011 to supply electricity to the local population.

In 2020, three former nuclear silo sites in the commune of Simiane-la-Rotonde were designated for the installation of photovoltaic power plants with capacities of 2.5 MWp, 3.6 MWp, and 3.7 MWp, to be operated by the developer Sonnedix.

== Personalities linked to the Albion Plateau ==
- The Agoult family, Provençal nobility.
- The Simiane family, Provençal nobility.
- Charles Dupuy-Montbrun (1530–1575), who built the Château de la Gabelle in Ferrassières.
- Godefroy Wendelin, settled in Provence from 1598 to 1612, created in 1603 the first meteorological and astronomical observatory of its kind.
- Jean François Palhier de Sylvabelle (1748–1822), mayor of Simiane and deputy to the Council of Five Hundred.
- Joseph Elzéar Morénas (1778–1830), orientalist and writer-botanist.
- Pierre Alexis de Ponson du Terrail (1829–1871), serial novelist, whose family originated from Simiane-la-Rotonde.
- René Seyssaud (1867–1952), Provençal painter.
- Eugène Martel (1869–1947), painter born in Revest.
- Henri Laugier (1888–1973), physiologist.
- Pierre Ambrogiani (1906–1985), painter of Corsican origin who lived in Aurel.
- Jacqueline Lamba (1910–1993), painter.
- Maurice Pic (1913–1991), politician.
- Philippe Beyne, alias d’Artagnan, and Maxime Fischer, alias Anatole, founders of the Maquis Ventoux.
- Pierre Martel (1923–2001), born in Revest, founder of Alpes de Lumière.
- Élisabeth Chabin (1944–), painter.

== See also ==
- Vaucluse
- Departments of France

== Bibliography ==
- Balfet, H; Bromberger, C; Ravis-Giordani, G (1976). "De la maison aux lointains" [From home to faraway places]. Pratiques et représentation de l'espace dans les communautés méditerranéennes [Practices and representation of space in Mediterranean communities] (in French). Marseille: Publications du CNRS.
- Benoit, Fernand (1992). La Provence et le Comtat Venaissin. Arts et traditions populaires [Provence and the Comtat Venaissin. Folk arts and traditions] (in French). Aubanel. ISBN 2700600614.
- Barruol, Guy; de Réparaz, André; Royer, Jean-Yves (2004). La Montagne de Lure, encyclopédie d'une montagne en Haute-Provence [The Lure Mountain, encyclopedia of a mountain in Haute-Provence] (in French). Les Alpes de Lumière. ISBN 2906162701.
- Gaubert, Gérard; Le Falher, Benoit (1990). Cavernes d'Albion. Hydrologie et spéléologie des territoires alimentant en eau la Fontaine de Vaucluse [Caves of Albion. Hydrology and speleology of the areas supplying water to the Fontaine de Vaucluse] (in French). Vol. 1. Éd. Association de recherches et d'études hydrologiques du plateau d’Albion (AREHPA).
