= Ferrassières =

- Commune
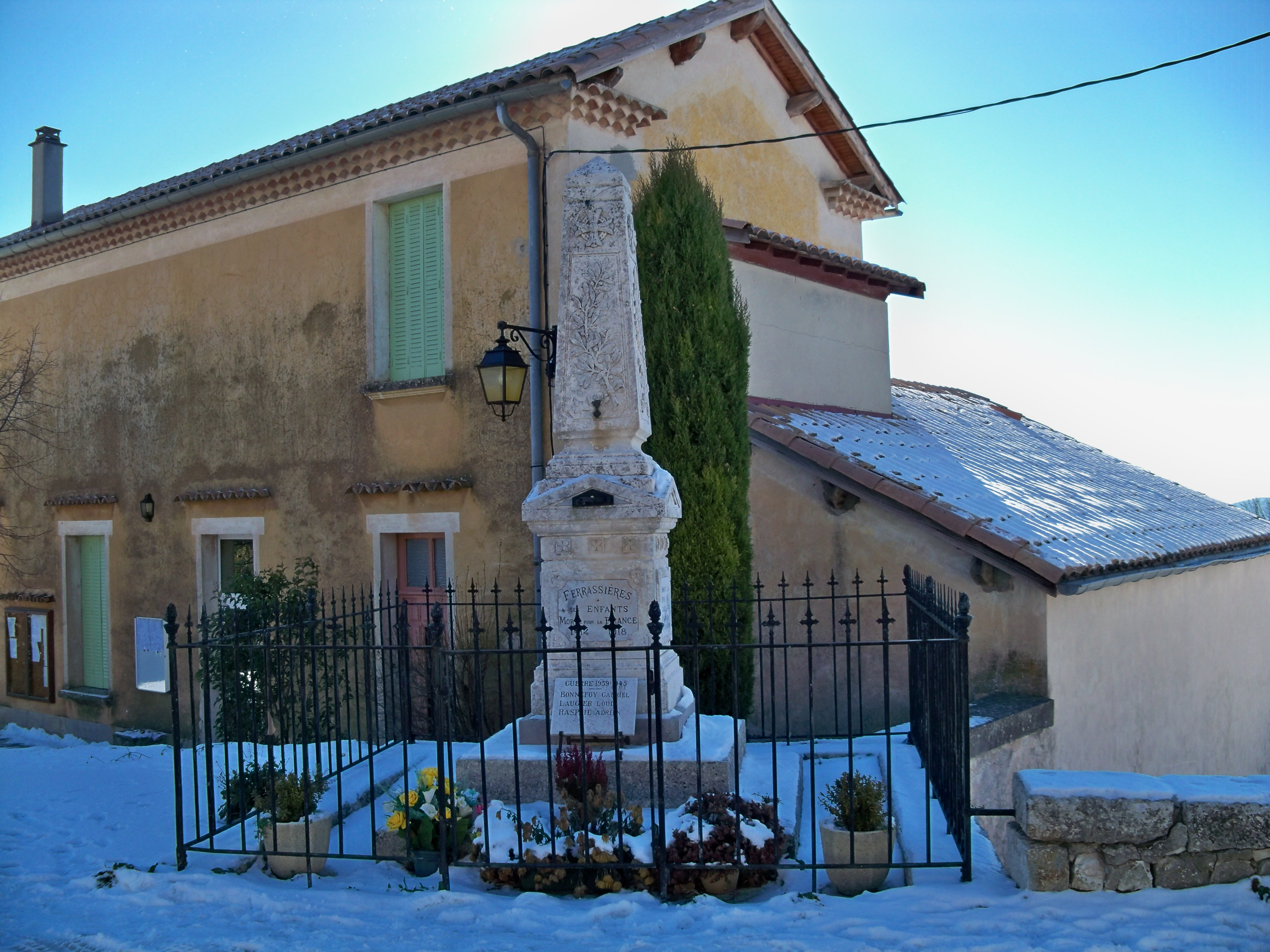
- The town hall and the monument to the dead

- Coat of arms
- Location of Ferrassières
- Location within France Location within Auvergne-Rhône-Alpes
- Coordinates: 44°08′11″N 5°28′45″E
- Country: France
- Region: Auvergne-Rhône-Alpes
- Department: Drôme
- Arrondissement: Nyons
- Canton: Nyons et Baronnies

Government
  - Mayor (2020–2026): Jean-Pierre Busi
- Area^{1}: 29.27 km^{2} (11.30 sq mi)
- Highest elevation: 1,389 m (4,557 ft)
- Lowest elevation: 830 m (2,720 ft)
- Population (2023): 122
  - Density: 4.17/km^{2} (10.8/sq mi)
- Time zone: UTC+01:00 (CET)
  - Summer (DST): UTC+02:00 (CEST)
- INSEE/Postal code: 26135 /26570
- ^{1} French Land Register data, which excludes lakes, ponds, glaciers > 1 km^{2} (0.386 sq mi or 247 acres) and river estuaries.

Ferrassières (French pronunciation: [fɛʁasjɛʁ]; Occitan: Ferrassières) is a commune in the Drôme department in the Auvergne-Rhône-Alpes region in southeastern France.

== Population ==
Historical population
Year	Pop.	±% p.a.
1968	109	—
1975	118	+1.14%
1982	124	+0.71%
1990	106	−1.94%
1999	113	+0.71%
2007	118	+0.54%
2012	118	+0.00%
2017	127	+1.48%
2023	122	−0.67%
Source: INSEE

== See also ==
- Communes of the Drôme department
