= Rove goat =

Breed of goat

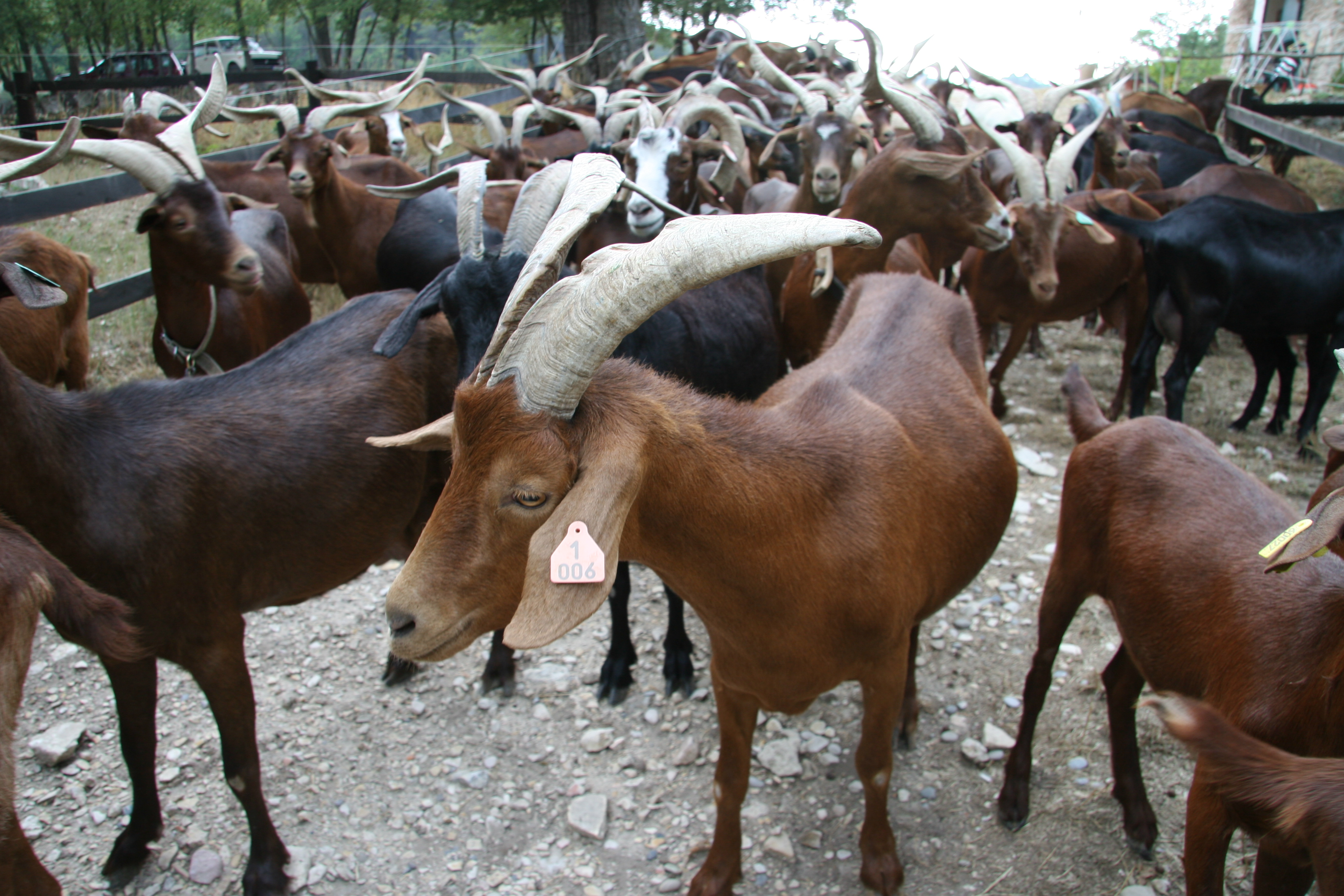
Rove Goats

The Rove (Occitan: Cabra dau Rove) is a breed of goat first domesticated in France. The breed was previously considered endangered, but as of 2003, more than 5,000 registered Roves are on French farms. The goat was originally bred for meat, but because the French market for goat meat was poor, farmers began to use the Rove for dairying instead.

== History ==
The Rove goat is from Le Rove, a small village near Marseille that gave it its name.

== Description ==
The Rove goat is primarily characterized by its long, twisted horns; they can reach nearly 4 ft in length. The goats have a smooth coat often in red or black, but also in ash gray, red speckled with white, red mixed with gray, black with tan markings under the eyes and nose, or red and black.

It is a medium-sized goat. Females range from 100 to 120 lbs and males between 175 and 200 lbs.
