= Hedgehog mushroom =

Hedgehog mushroom is a common name of several fungi species and may refer to:

- Hydnum repandum
- Hericium erinaceus
