= Canton of Ribiers =

Coordinates: 44°41′07″N 6°19′33″E

Ribiers
- Former canton
- Interactive map of Ribiers
- Country: France
- Region: Provence-Alpes-Côte d'Azur
- Department: Hautes-Alpes
- No. of communes: {{{nbcomm}}}
- Disbanded: 2015
- Area: 146.94 km^{2} (56.73 sq mi)
- Population (2012): 1,795
  - Density: 12.22/km^{2} (31.64/sq mi)

The canton of Ribiers is a former administrative division in southeastern France. It was disbanded following the French canton reorganisation which came into effect in March 2015. It consisted of 7 communes, which joined the canton of Laragne-Montéglin in 2015. It had 1,795 inhabitants (2012).

The canton comprised the following communes:

- Antonaves
- Barret-sur-Méouge
- Châteauneuf-de-Chabre
- Éourres
- Ribiers
- Saint-Pierre-Avez
- Salérans

== Demographics ==
Historical population Canton of Ribiers
Year	1962	1968	1975	1982	1990	1999
Pop.	923	1,120	1,169	1,167	1,385	1,518
±%	—	+21.3%	+4.4%	−0.2%	+18.7%	+9.6%
From the year 1962 on: No double counting – residents of multiple communes (e.g. students and military personnel) are counted only once. Source: INSEE

== See also ==
- Cantons of the Hautes-Alpes department
