= Méouge =

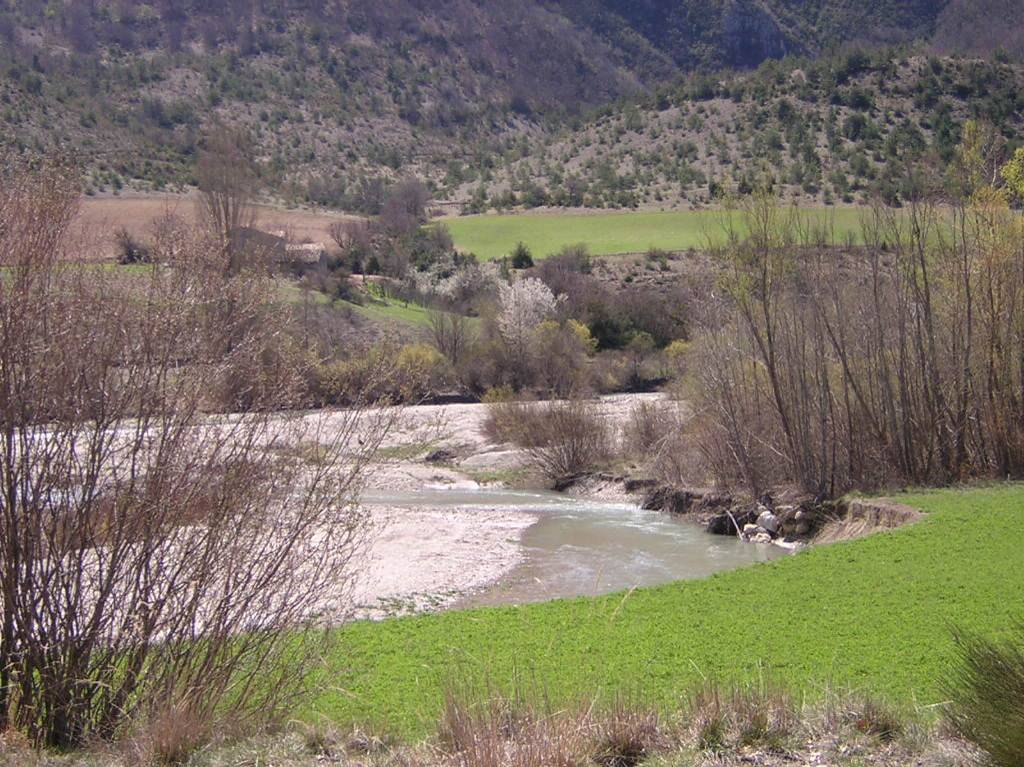
- Méouge

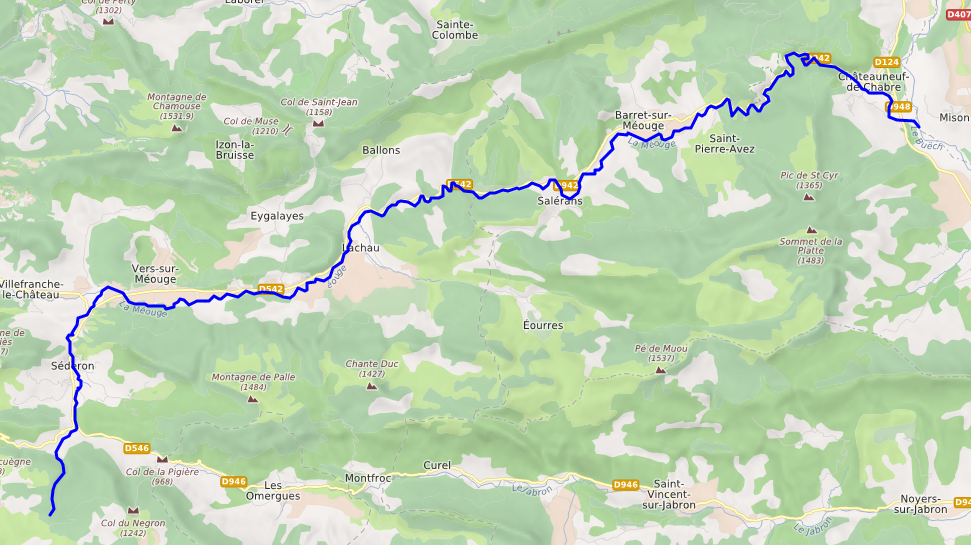
- Course of the Méouge

Location
- Country: France

Physical characteristics
- Source
  - location: Séderon, Drôme
  - elevation: 960 m (3,150 ft)
- Mouth: Buëch
  - location: Châteauneuf-de-Chabre, Hautes-Alpes
  - coordinates: 44°15′46″N 5°49′39″E
  - elevation: 530 m (1,740 ft)
- Length: 39.6 km (24.6 mi)
- Basin size: 229 km^{2} (88 sq mi)

Basin features
- Progression: Buëch→ Durance→ Rhône→ Mediterranean Sea

The Méouge (French pronunciation: [meuʒ]; Occitan: Mèuja) is a 39-kilometre (24 mi) river in the Auvergne-Rhône-Alpes and Provence-Alpes-Côte d'Azur regions of the south of France. It rises in the Drôme near the town of Séderon and crosses into the Hautes-Alpes at Barret-sur-Méouge where it carves the spectacular tourist attraction, the Gorges de la Méouge, through the limestone platform. Near the communities of Châteauneuf-de-Chabre and Antonaves it joins the river Buëch which in turn flows into the Durance and the Rhône. Its drainage basin is 229 km^{2} (88 sq mi).

== Gorges de la Méouge ==
The "Gorges de la Méouge" is a 7-kilometre (4.3 mi) long gorge carved by the Méouge though the mesozoic limestone rock of the Hautes-Alpes in the Provence-Alpes-Côte d'Azur region. The lime colored gorge has wild shapes, small sandy beaches, huge polished pebbles, water holes and waterfalls. It is famous for swimming. The medieval bridge of Châteauneuf de Chabre is classified as a historical monument. The gorges are also classified Natural Areas of Ecological Interest, Fauna and Flora whose flora and fauna are protected.

== Municipalities and townships crossed ==
In both departments of Hautes-Alpes (05) and Drôme (26), the Méouge passes through eleven communities and two cantons. These include : Barret-de-Lioure (source), Séderon, Vers-sur-Méouge, Eygalayes, Lachau, Ballons, Salérans, Barret-sur-Méouge, Saint-Pierre-Avez, Châteauneuf-de-Chabre, Antonaves (confluence).

== Tributaries ==
The Méouge has approximately 30 tributaries :

- the Touissit ravine,
- the Lèbrières ravine,
- the Défens stream,
- the Lioron ravine,
- the Rivadet ravine,
- the Rieu river
- the Villefranche stream with four tributaries
- the Voluy stream with two tributaries
- the Colombier ravine
- the Front-Cold ravine
- the Vignard ravine,
- the Saulce river with a tributary
- the Riançon river with two tributaries
- the Auzance, with two tributaries
- the Mouessoron river
- the Great Combe ravine
- the Couzaut stream with a tributary
- the stream through the Serre,
- the Fontaine Aillaud ravine,
- the Tramier ravine,
- the ravine of salt water,
- the Rif stream with three tributaries
- the Bigarière stream,
- The Fraches stream with a tributary
- the Vines stream
- the d'Ourse stream with a tributary
- the Peysson stream,
- the Rif stream with a tributary
- the Gironde stream,

== Hydrology ==
The Méouge watershed has an area of 229 square kilometres (88 mi^{2}) (by SANDRE) and 225 square kilometres (87 mi^{2}) (by SIEM 7). It covers 14 municipalities and between 1,500 and 2,000 residents, mostly living in the municipalities of the Canton of Ribiers.
