= Angelo Pardi =

Fictional character created by Jean Giono

Angelo Pardi is a fictional character created by the French writer Jean Giono. A hussar colonel from Piedmont, Pardi experiences a series of adventures in Provence and Italy in the 1830s and 1840s. He is the main character in the novels The Horseman on the Roof from 1951 and The Straw Man from 1957, as well as Angelo, which is an earlier version of the story that became The Horseman on the Roof. They are part of Giono's unfinished Hussard cycle, originally intended to tell the Pardi family's story in the 19th and 20th centuries through ten novels, the first five of which were supposed to be about Angelo Pardi. The Horseman on the Roof was the basis for a 1995 film with the same name where Olivier Martinez plays Pardi.

== History and description ==
Jean Giono was influenced by Stendhal when he conceived and wrote the stories about Angelo Pardi, a young Italian hussar colonel and the illegitimate son of a Piedmont aristocrat. Giono wanted to write a sequence of ten novels called the Hussard cycle. The first group of five were meant to be about Angelo Pardi in the 19th century and the second group of five about his grandson Angelo Pardi II in the 20th century.

The first published novel about Angelo Pardi is The Horseman on the Roof (French: Le Hussard sur le toit) from 1951. It is set in 1832 during a cholera outbreak in Provence and tells the story of how Pardi arrives in the region and meets a woman named Pauline. In 1953, Angelo was serialised in Nouvelle Revue Française. This novel is an early treatment of the story that eventually became The Horseman on the Roof and gives a different version of Pardi's arrival in Provence. The final finished Angelo Pardi novel is The Straw Man (French: Le Bonheur fou), published in 1957. Here, Pardi returns to Italy and experiences the revolution of 1848.

The only finished novel about Angelo Pardi II is Mort d'un personnage, serialised in the Revue de Paris in 1948, which features Pauline at the end of her life. Pauline also appears in the short story collection Les Récits de la demi-brigade, which was published posthumously in 1972 and consists of stories written from 1954 to 1965 and previously published by the Rotary Club of Manosque and Elle.

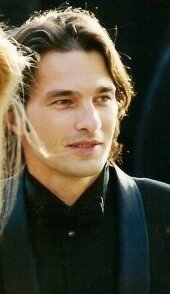
Olivier Martinez played Pardi in the film The Horseman on the Roof.

The Horseman on the Roof is the most famous novel about Pardi. When it was published, French literary critics likened Pardi to heroes of medieval legends, such as Perceval, Galahad and Lancelot. Marcel Arland described him as a chevalier servant. According to the scholar Norma Lorre Goodrich, Giono originally intended to write a prose epic and modelled Pardi on the heroes of medieval chansons de geste, but as the stories about the character evolved, he modified the overall project into something that more resembles a modern courtly romance.

Olivier Martinez starred as Pardi in the 1995 film The Horseman on the Roof by the director Jean-Paul Rappeneau. When the film was released, Stephen Holden of The New York Times described Pardi as "nothing less than 19th-century heroism incarnate".
