= The Straw Man =

1957 novel by Jean Giono

- First English-language edition
- Author: Jean Giono
- Original title: Le Bonheur fou
- Translator: Phyllis Johnson
- Language: French
- Publisher: Éditions Gallimard
- Publication date: 14 April 1957
- Publication place: France
- English publication date: 1959 (Knopf)
- Pages: 461

The Straw Man is a 1957 novel by the French writer Jean Giono. Its French title is Le Bonheur fou, which means "the mad happiness". The story is set in the 1840s and follows Angelo Pardi as he is caught up in plots leading up to the Italian revolution of 1848. The novel is a standalone sequel to The Horseman on the Roof, which is set earlier and also features Pardi as the main character. The novels were part of Giono's planned Hussar Cycle. The Straw Man was published in English in 1959, translated by Phyllis Johnson.

== Reception ==
R. W. B. Lewis reviewed the book in The Saturday Review: "Like its hero, the book has vigor without direction, and it is careful never to be significant. Where it is engaging, it is as a healthy dog is engaging, dashing from tree to tree or cat to cat, tongue hanging out, feeling wonderfully well, and wholly without a plan for the rest of the morning's play." Lewis went on: "The one aim Giono seems to have in mind, apart from the contriving of swift and lively episodes and the exact rendering of physical sensations, is to recapture something of the spirit of Stendhal, especially The Charterhouse of Parma. ... The prose of The Straw Man likewise attempts the Stendhalian eruptions of ironic juxtaposition, and it indulges in the same nervous, playful italicizing. I find the effort dubious and the result a trifle annoying."
