= Olivier Martinez =

French actor (born 1966)

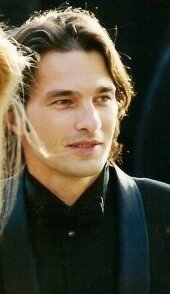
- Martinez at the 2000 Cannes Film Festival
- Born: 12 January 1966 (age 60); Paris, France
- Occupation: Actor
- Years active: 1990–present
- Spouse: Halle Berry (m. 2013; div. 2016)
- Children: 1

Olivier Martinez (born 12 January 1966) is a French actor. He became well known after roles in several French films such as Un, deux, trois, soleil (1993), which garnered him the César Award for "Most Promising Actor", The Horseman on the Roof (1995), and The Chambermaid on the Titanic (1997). He has also appeared in Hollywood-produced features, including the drama Before Night Falls (2000) and the erotic thriller Unfaithful (2002), and playing the role of a French drug lord in the action-crime-thriller S.W.A.T. (2003).

== Early life ==
Martinez was born in Paris, France, to a working-class family. His father was a Spanish professional boxer and his mother was a French secretary. Olivier trained as a boxer and dreamed to become a professional boxer, but after trauma decided to become an actor. He studied at the CNSAD and began his acting career in his native France in 1990. Martinez was raised Catholic.

== Career ==
In 1994, Martinez won a César Award as "Most Promising Actor" for his role in the film Un, deux, trois, soleil (1993). This was followed by a leading role in the Jean-Paul Rappeneau period film The Horseman on the Roof (Le Hussard sur le Toit) in 1995 in which he starred alongside Juliette Binoche as an Italian nobleman. The film was hailed as the most expensive French film at that time in history but failed to reach its $35 million budget. In 1996/7 he appeared in Bertrand Blier's romantic comedy My Man (Mon Homme) alongside Anouk Grinberg, Gérard Lanvin, and Valeria Bruni Tedeschi. Later in 1997 he played a leading role in Bigas Luna's drama The Chambermaid on the Titanic (La Femme de chambre du Titanic) alongside Romane Bohringer, set during the time of the Titanic's sinking voyage in 1912. Martinez portrays a French foundry worker who wins a strongman contest and the prize of a trip to view the departing maiden voyage of the ill-fated Titanic. The film was well-received; Mick LaSalle of the San Francisco Chronicle praised what he felt was a rare honest portrayal of male sexuality by Martinez.

Martinez first came to mainstream attention in Hollywood films with his performance in Julian Schnabel's Before Night Falls (2000) opposite Javier Bardem and Johnny Depp. The screenplay is based on the autobiography of the same name of Reinaldo Arenas, which was published in English in 1993. The film was highly critically acclaimed, although Martinez's performance was overshadowed by that of Bardem in the eyes of critics. In early 2000s Martinez was in the peak of popularity, reached the status of sex symbol and was called "French Brad Pitt". He was later noted for his performance opposite Diane Lane in Unfaithful (2002). He has since appeared in a television adaptation of The Roman Spring of Mrs. Stone (2003), S.W.A.T. (2003) and Taking Lives (2004). He also starred as Gabriel in the 2007 movie adaptation of Blood and Chocolate, a popular book. Martinez plays Mauritius, prefect of Mamertine Prison in Paul, Apostle of Christ (2017).

== Personal life ==
Martinez began a relationship with Australian singer and actress Kylie Minogue after meeting her at the 2003 Grammy Awards ceremony. They ended their relationship in February 2007.

Martinez began dating American actress Halle Berry in 2010 after meeting on the set of the action thriller film Dark Tide (2012). They confirmed their engagement in March 2012. On 22 November 2012, Martinez was treated at a Los Angeles hospital after being injured in a physical altercation with Canadian model Gabriel Aubry, Berry's former partner and father of her daughter. Aubry and Berry had been involved in a custody battle centered on Berry's desire to move with their daughter and Martinez to his native France, a request denied by a judge less than two weeks prior to the altercation, on the grounds that it would interfere with Berry and Aubry's joint custody arrangement. The custody dispute was resolved at the end of November.

Berry and Martinez married in a private ceremony in France on 13 July 2013. Their son was born in October 2013 in Los Angeles. They announced their divorce in 2015, and it was finalized in December 2016. In August 2023, issues dealing with custody and child support were settled.

Apart from his native French, he is also fluent in Spanish and English.

== Filmography ==
=== Film ===
Year	Title	Role	Language	Notes
1990	Plein Fer	Pascal	French	
1992	IP5: L'île aux pachydermes	Tony	French	
1992	Les Paroles invisibles		French	Short
1993	1, 2, 3, Sun	Petit Paul	French	
1995	The Horseman on the Roof	Angelo Pardi	French	
1996	My Man	Jean-François	French	
1997	The Chambermaid on the Titanic	Horty	French	
1999	La ciudad de los prodigios	Onofre Bouvila	Spanish	
2000	Nosotras	David	Spanish	
2000	La Taule	Le Muet	French	
2000	Toreros	Manuel	French	
2000	Before Night Falls	Lázaro Gómez Carriles	English	
2000	Bullfighter	Jack	English	
2002	Semana santa	Quemada	English	
2002	Unfaithful	Paul Martel	English	
2003	S.W.A.T.	Alex "Le Loup Rouge" Montel	English	
2004	Taking Lives	Inspector Joseph Paquette	English	
2007	Blood & Chocolate	Gabriel	English	
2010	Knight and Day	Beach Scene	English	Uncredited
2012	Dark Tide	Jeff Mathieson	English	
2013	The Physician	Shah Ala ad-Daula	English	
2018	Paul, Apostle of Christ	Mauritius	English	
2020	Mosquito State	Edward Werner	English	

=== Television ===
Year	Title	Role	Language	Notes
1990	Navarro	Rollo	French	TV series, episode: "Barbès de l'aube à l'aurore"
1992	Odyssée Bidon	Phil	French	TV film
2003	The Roman Spring of Mrs. Stone	Paolo di Lio	English	TV film
2012	Cybergeddon	Gustov Dobreff	English	TV series (2 episodes)
2012	Cybergeddon Zips	Gustov	English	TV series (1 episode: "Gustov")
2014	Revenge	Pascal LeMarchal	English	TV series, recurring role (5 episodes)
2015	Texas Rising	General Antonio López de Santa Anna	English	Miniseries
2016	Mars	Ed Grann	English	Season 1
2022	Loot	Jean-Pierre	English	TV series, recurring role

== Awards ==
Year	Award	Category	Result	Notes
1993	Prix Jean Gabin		Won	
1993	César Awards	Most Promising Actor (Meilleur jeune espoir masculin)	Nominated	IP5: L'île aux pachydermes
1994	César Awards	Most Promising Actor (Meilleur jeune espoir masculin)	Won	Un, deux, trois, soleil
