= Ribiers =

- Part of Val Buëch-Méouge
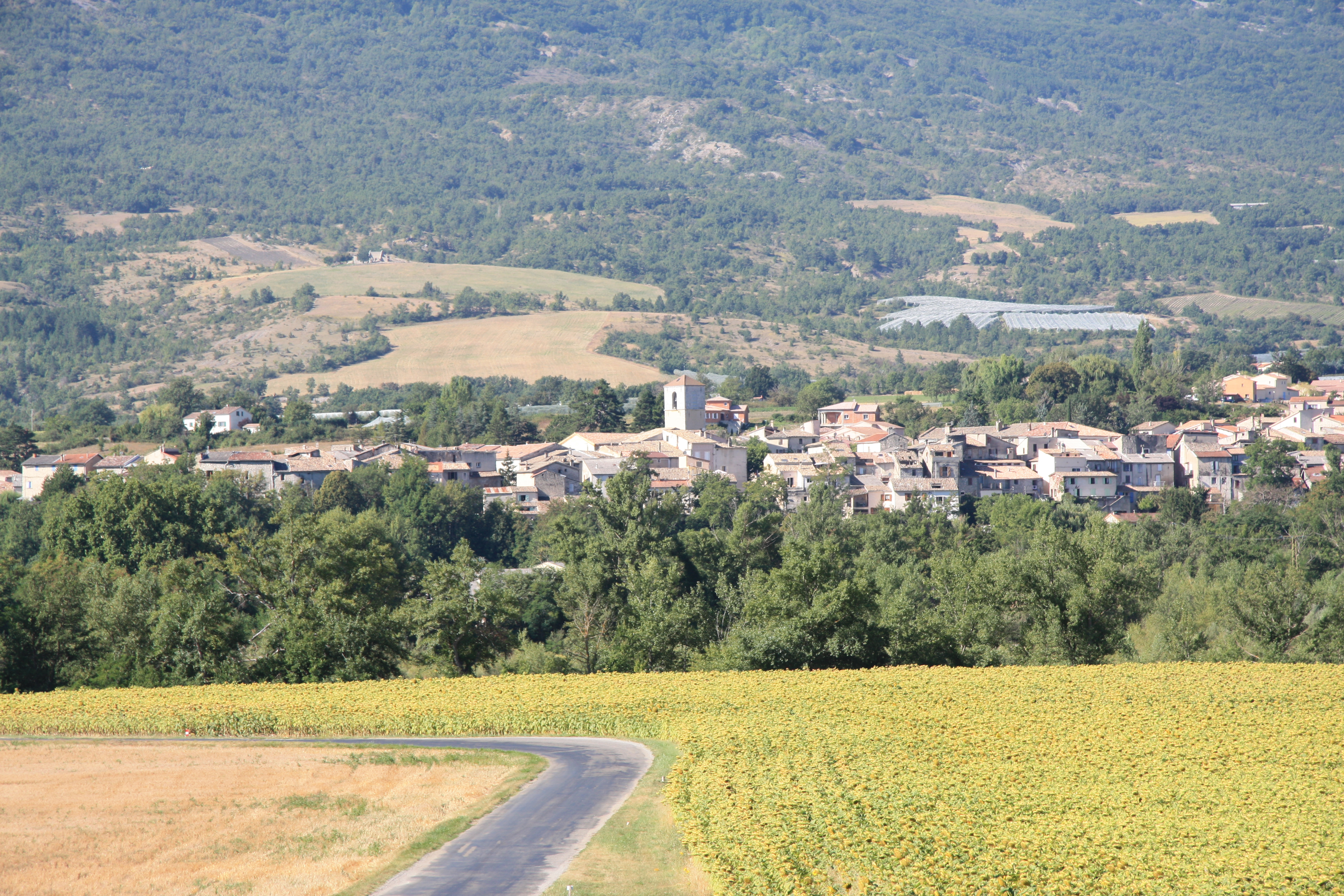
- A view of the village of Ribiers from the Mison road

- Coat of arms
- Location of Ribiers
- Location within France Location within Provence-Alpes-Côte d'Azur
- Coordinates: 44°13′55″N 5°51′26″E
- Country: France
- Region: Provence-Alpes-Côte d'Azur
- Department: Hautes-Alpes
- Arrondissement: Gap
- Canton: Ribiers
- Commune: Val Buëch-Méouge
- Area^{1}: 36.55 km^{2} (14.11 sq mi)
- Elevation: 519 m (1,703 ft)
- Highest elevation: 1,480 m (4,860 ft)
- Lowest elevation: 464 m (1,522 ft)
- Population (2023): 812
  - Density: 22.2/km^{2} (57.5/sq mi)
- Time zone: UTC+01:00 (CET)
  - Summer (DST): UTC+02:00 (CEST)
- Postal code: 05300
- ^{1} French Land Register data, which excludes lakes, ponds, glaciers > 1 km^{2} (0.386 sq mi or 247 acres) and river estuaries.

Ribiers (French pronunciation: [ʁibje]) is a former commune in the Hautes-Alpes department in southeastern France. On 1 January 2016, it was merged into the new commune Val Buëch-Méouge.

== Geography ==
=== Climate ===
Ribiers has a warm-summer mediterranean climate (Köppen climate classification Csb). The average annual temperature in Ribiers is 11.7 °C (53.1 °F). The average annual rainfall is 913.5 mm (35.96 in) with October as the wettest month. The temperatures are highest on average in July, at around 21.6 °C (70.9 °F), and lowest in January, at around 2.1 °C (35.8 °F). The highest temperature ever recorded in Ribiers was 40.9 °C (105.6 °F) on 28 June 2019; the coldest temperature ever recorded was −15.4 °C (4.3 °F) on 12 January 1987.

Climate data for Ribiers (1981–2010 averages, extremes 1986−present)
Month	Jan	Feb	Mar	Apr	May	Jun	Jul	Aug	Sep	Oct	Nov	Dec	Year
Record high °C (°F)	20.2 (68.4)	23.3 (73.9)	26.3 (79.3)	29.0 (84.2)	32.4 (90.3)	40.9 (105.6)	38.2 (100.8)	38.9 (102.0)	33.4 (92.1)	29.8 (85.6)	20.8 (69.4)	17.6 (63.7)	40.9 (105.6)
Mean daily maximum °C (°F)	6.9 (44.4)	10.2 (50.4)	14.7 (58.5)	17.1 (62.8)	22.1 (71.8)	26.3 (79.3)	29.7 (85.5)	29.3 (84.7)	23.9 (75.0)	18.3 (64.9)	11.3 (52.3)	6.7 (44.1)	18.1 (64.6)
Daily mean °C (°F)	2.1 (35.8)	4.3 (39.7)	8.1 (46.6)	10.6 (51.1)	15.1 (59.2)	18.7 (65.7)	21.6 (70.9)	21.3 (70.3)	16.8 (62.2)	12.5 (54.5)	6.5 (43.7)	2.5 (36.5)	11.7 (53.1)
Mean daily minimum °C (°F)	−2.6 (27.3)	−1.6 (29.1)	1.5 (34.7)	4.1 (39.4)	8.1 (46.6)	11.2 (52.2)	13.4 (56.1)	13.3 (55.9)	9.8 (49.6)	6.7 (44.1)	1.7 (35.1)	−1.7 (28.9)	5.4 (41.7)
Record low °C (°F)	−15.4 (4.3)	−13.9 (7.0)	−12.0 (10.4)	−4.5 (23.9)	−2.0 (28.4)	1.5 (34.7)	6.2 (43.2)	5.5 (41.9)	0.3 (32.5)	−4.1 (24.6)	−10.3 (13.5)	−14.1 (6.6)	−15.4 (4.3)
Average precipitation mm (inches)	73.5 (2.89)	47.6 (1.87)	51.8 (2.04)	91.9 (3.62)	78.1 (3.07)	62.7 (2.47)	36.0 (1.42)	51.5 (2.03)	93.9 (3.70)	123.5 (4.86)	119.5 (4.70)	83.5 (3.29)	913.5 (35.96)
Average precipitation days (≥ 1.0 mm)	6.6	5.3	5.7	9.0	8.2	6.5	4.2	4.7	5.9	8.8	7.6	7.5	80.2
Source: Meteociel

== Population ==
Historical population
Year	Pop.	±% p.a.
1962	485	—
1968	481	−0.14%
1975	533	+1.48%
1982	592	+1.51%
1990	637	+0.92%
1999	677	+0.68%
2023	812	+0.76%
Source: EHESS and INSEE

== See also ==
- Communes of the Hautes-Alpes department
