= Monêtier-Allemont =

- Commune
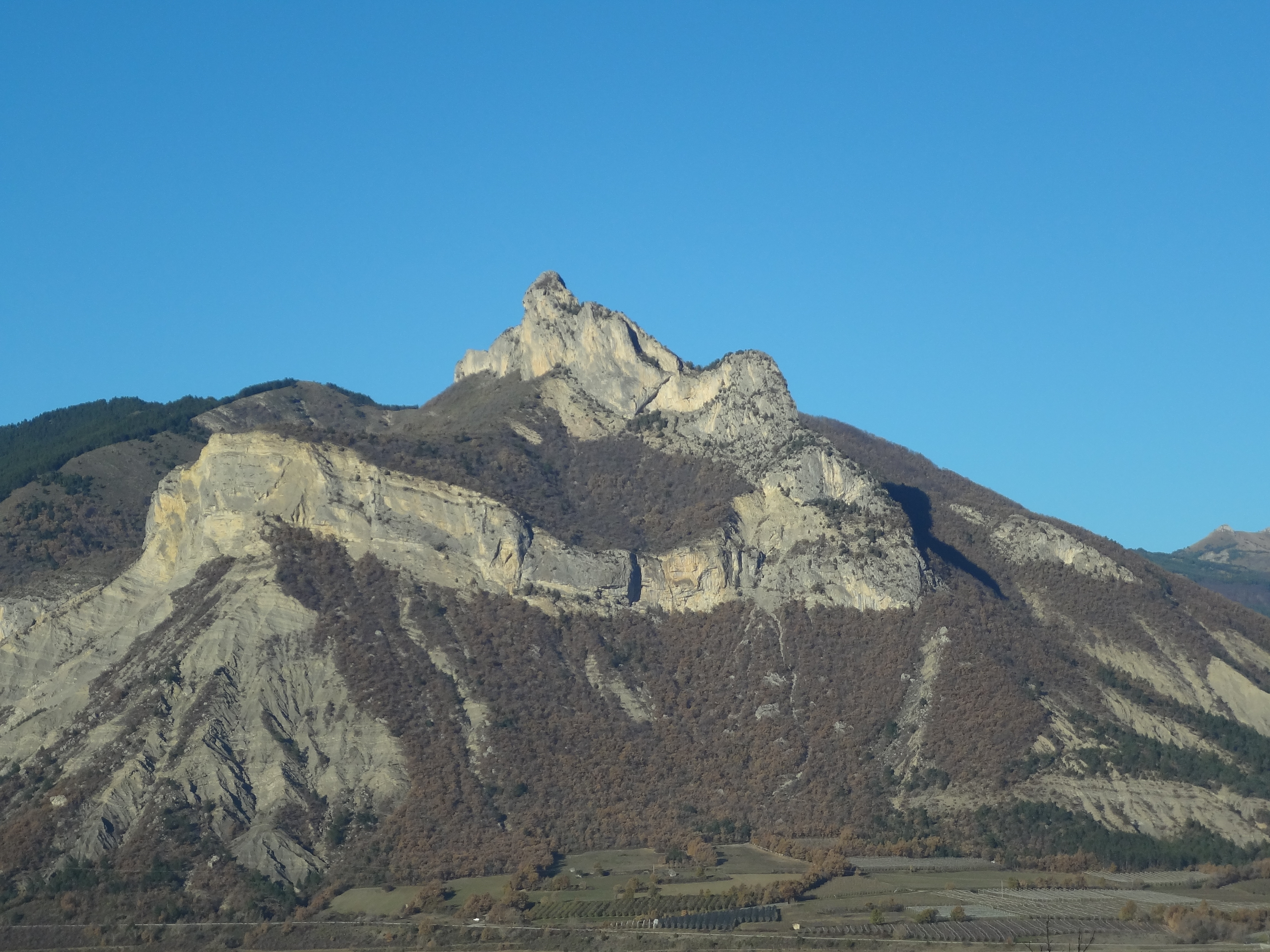
- The Pic de Crigne from the east, in the commune of Monêtier-Allemont

- Coat of arms
- Location of Monêtier-Allemont
- Location within France Location within Provence-Alpes-Côte d'Azur
- Coordinates: 44°23′12″N 5°56′37″E
- Country: France
- Region: Provence-Alpes-Côte d'Azur
- Department: Hautes-Alpes
- Arrondissement: Gap
- Canton: Laragne-Montéglin

Government
  - Mayor (2026–32): Henri Mevolhon
- Area^{1}: 7.15 km^{2} (2.76 sq mi)
- Elevation: 558 m (1,831 ft)
- Highest elevation: 1,373 m (4,505 ft)
- Lowest elevation: 530 m (1,740 ft)
- Population (2023): 302
  - Density: 42.2/km^{2} (109/sq mi)
- Time zone: UTC+01:00 (CET)
  - Summer (DST): UTC+02:00 (CEST)
- INSEE/Postal code: 05078 /05110
- ^{1} French Land Register data, which excludes lakes, ponds, glaciers > 1 km^{2} (0.386 sq mi or 247 acres) and river estuaries.

Monêtier-Allemont (French pronunciation: [mɔnɛtje almɔ̃]; Occitan: Monestier Alamont) is a commune in the Hautes-Alpes department in southeastern France.

== Population ==
Historical population
Year	Pop.	±% p.a.
1968	285	—
1975	286	+0.05%
1982	240	−2.47%
1990	228	−0.64%
1999	265	+1.68%
2007	317	+2.26%
2012	305	−0.77%
2017	283	−1.49%
2023	302	+1.09%
Source: INSEE

== See also ==
- Communes of the Hautes-Alpes department
