= Lazer, Hautes-Alpes =

Lazer
- Commune
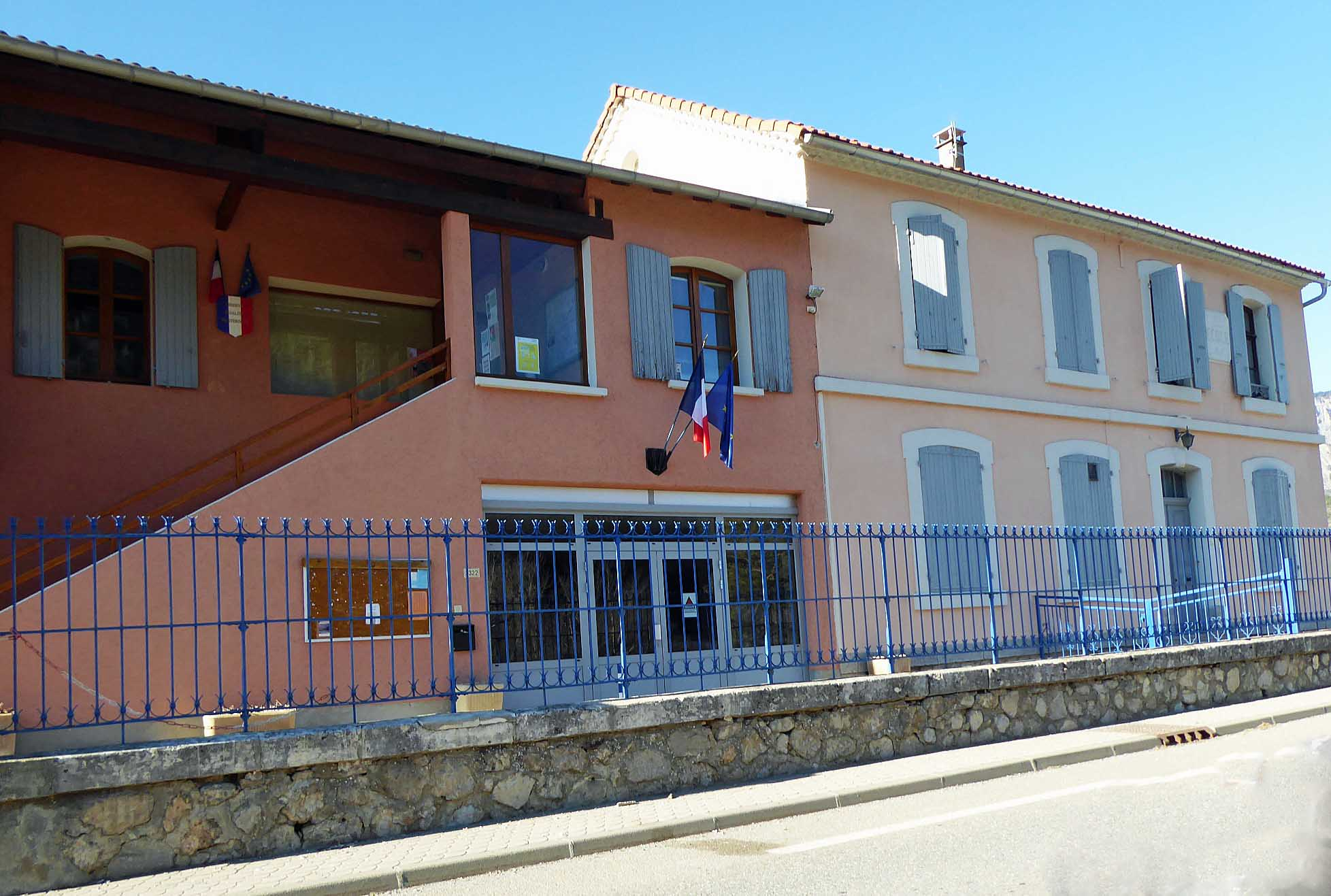
- Lazer Town hall

- Coat of arms
- Location of Lazer
- Location within France Location within Provence-Alpes-Côte d'Azur
- Coordinates: 44°20′57″N 5°50′18″E
- Country: France
- Region: Provence-Alpes-Côte d'Azur
- Department: Hautes-Alpes
- Arrondissement: Gap
- Canton: Laragne-Montéglin

Government
  - Mayor (2026–32): Serge Maoui
- Area^{1}: 21.98 km^{2} (8.49 sq mi)
- Elevation: 600 m (2,000 ft)
- Highest elevation: 1,321 m (4,334 ft)
- Lowest elevation: 565 m (1,854 ft)
- Population (2023): 345
  - Density: 15.7/km^{2} (40.7/sq mi)
- Time zone: UTC+01:00 (CET)
  - Summer (DST): UTC+02:00 (CEST)
- INSEE/Postal code: 05073 /05300
- ^{1} French Land Register data, which excludes lakes, ponds, glaciers > 1 km^{2} (0.386 sq mi or 247 acres) and river estuaries.

Lazer is a commune in the Hautes-Alpes department in southeastern France.

== Population ==
Historical population
Year	Pop.	±% p.a.
1968	174	—
1975	176	+0.16%
1982	258	+5.62%
1990	267	+0.43%
1999	274	+0.29%
2007	336	+2.58%
2012	340	+0.24%
2017	359	+1.09%
2023	345	−0.66%
Source: INSEE

== See also ==
- Communes of the Hautes-Alpes department
