= Val Buëch-Méouge =

- Commune
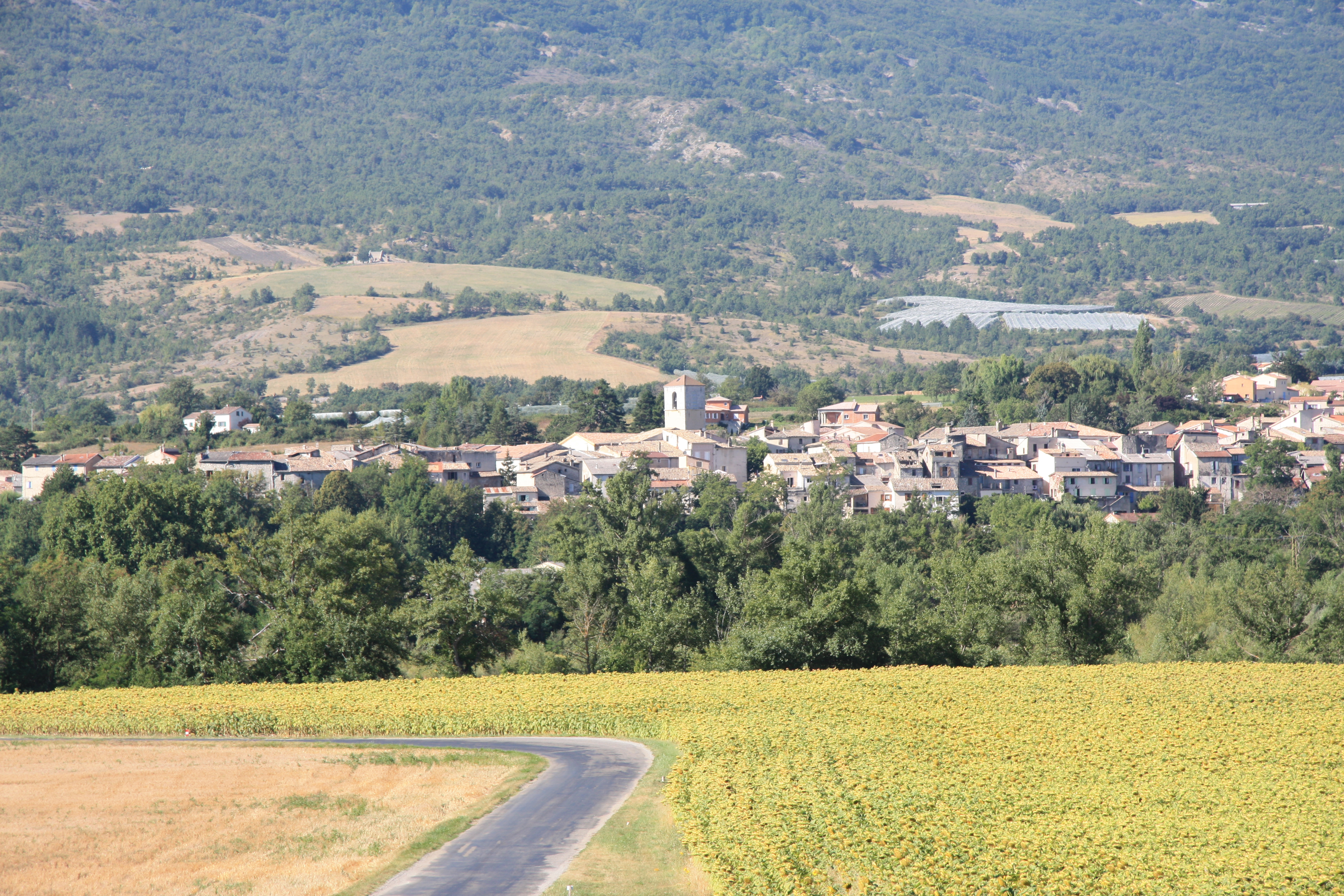
- Location of Val Buëch-Méouge
- Location within France Location within Provence-Alpes-Côte d'Azur
- Coordinates: 44°13′52″N 5°51′22″E
- Country: France
- Region: Provence-Alpes-Côte d'Azur
- Department: Hautes-Alpes
- Arrondissement: Gap
- Canton: Laragne-Montéglin

Government
  - Mayor (2026–32): Gérard Nicolas
- Area^{1}: 68.48 km^{2} (26.44 sq mi)
- Population (2023): 1,354
  - Density: 19.77/km^{2} (51.21/sq mi)
- Time zone: UTC+01:00 (CET)
  - Summer (DST): UTC+02:00 (CEST)
- INSEE/Postal code: 05118 /05300
- ^{1} French Land Register data, which excludes lakes, ponds, glaciers > 1 km^{2} (0.386 sq mi or 247 acres) and river estuaries.

Val Buëch-Méouge (French pronunciation: [la bɥɛʃ meuʒ]) is a commune in the Hautes-Alpes department of southeastern France. The municipality was established on 1 January 2016 and consists of the former communes of Ribiers, Châteauneuf-de-Chabre and Antonaves.

== Geography ==
=== Climate ===
Val Buëch-Méouge has a warm-summer mediterranean climate (Köppen climate classification Csb). The average annual temperature in Val Buëch-Méouge is 11.7 °C (53.1 °F). The average annual rainfall is 913.5 mm (35.96 in) with October as the wettest month. The temperatures are highest on average in July, at around 21.6 °C (70.9 °F), and lowest in January, at around 2.1 °C (35.8 °F). The highest temperature ever recorded in Val Buëch-Méouge was 40.9 °C (105.6 °F) on 28 June 2019; the coldest temperature ever recorded was −15.4 °C (4.3 °F) on 12 January 1987.

Climate data for Ribiers, Val Buëch-Méouge (1981–2010 averages, extremes 1986−present)
Month	Jan	Feb	Mar	Apr	May	Jun	Jul	Aug	Sep	Oct	Nov	Dec	Year
Record high °C (°F)	20.2 (68.4)	23.3 (73.9)	26.3 (79.3)	29.0 (84.2)	32.4 (90.3)	40.9 (105.6)	38.2 (100.8)	38.9 (102.0)	33.4 (92.1)	29.8 (85.6)	20.8 (69.4)	17.6 (63.7)	40.9 (105.6)
Mean daily maximum °C (°F)	6.9 (44.4)	10.2 (50.4)	14.7 (58.5)	17.1 (62.8)	22.1 (71.8)	26.3 (79.3)	29.7 (85.5)	29.3 (84.7)	23.9 (75.0)	18.3 (64.9)	11.3 (52.3)	6.7 (44.1)	18.1 (64.6)
Daily mean °C (°F)	2.1 (35.8)	4.3 (39.7)	8.1 (46.6)	10.6 (51.1)	15.1 (59.2)	18.7 (65.7)	21.6 (70.9)	21.3 (70.3)	16.8 (62.2)	12.5 (54.5)	6.5 (43.7)	2.5 (36.5)	11.7 (53.1)
Mean daily minimum °C (°F)	−2.6 (27.3)	−1.6 (29.1)	1.5 (34.7)	4.1 (39.4)	8.1 (46.6)	11.2 (52.2)	13.4 (56.1)	13.3 (55.9)	9.8 (49.6)	6.7 (44.1)	1.7 (35.1)	−1.7 (28.9)	5.4 (41.7)
Record low °C (°F)	−15.4 (4.3)	−13.9 (7.0)	−12.0 (10.4)	−4.5 (23.9)	−2.0 (28.4)	1.5 (34.7)	6.2 (43.2)	5.5 (41.9)	0.3 (32.5)	−4.1 (24.6)	−10.3 (13.5)	−14.1 (6.6)	−15.4 (4.3)
Average precipitation mm (inches)	73.5 (2.89)	47.6 (1.87)	51.8 (2.04)	91.9 (3.62)	78.1 (3.07)	62.7 (2.47)	36.0 (1.42)	51.5 (2.03)	93.9 (3.70)	123.5 (4.86)	119.5 (4.70)	83.5 (3.29)	913.5 (35.96)
Average precipitation days (≥ 1.0 mm)	6.6	5.3	5.7	9.0	8.2	6.5	4.2	4.7	5.9	8.8	7.6	7.5	80.2
Source: Meteociel

== See also ==
- Communes of the Hautes-Alpes department
