= Antonaves =

- Part of Val Buëch-Méouge
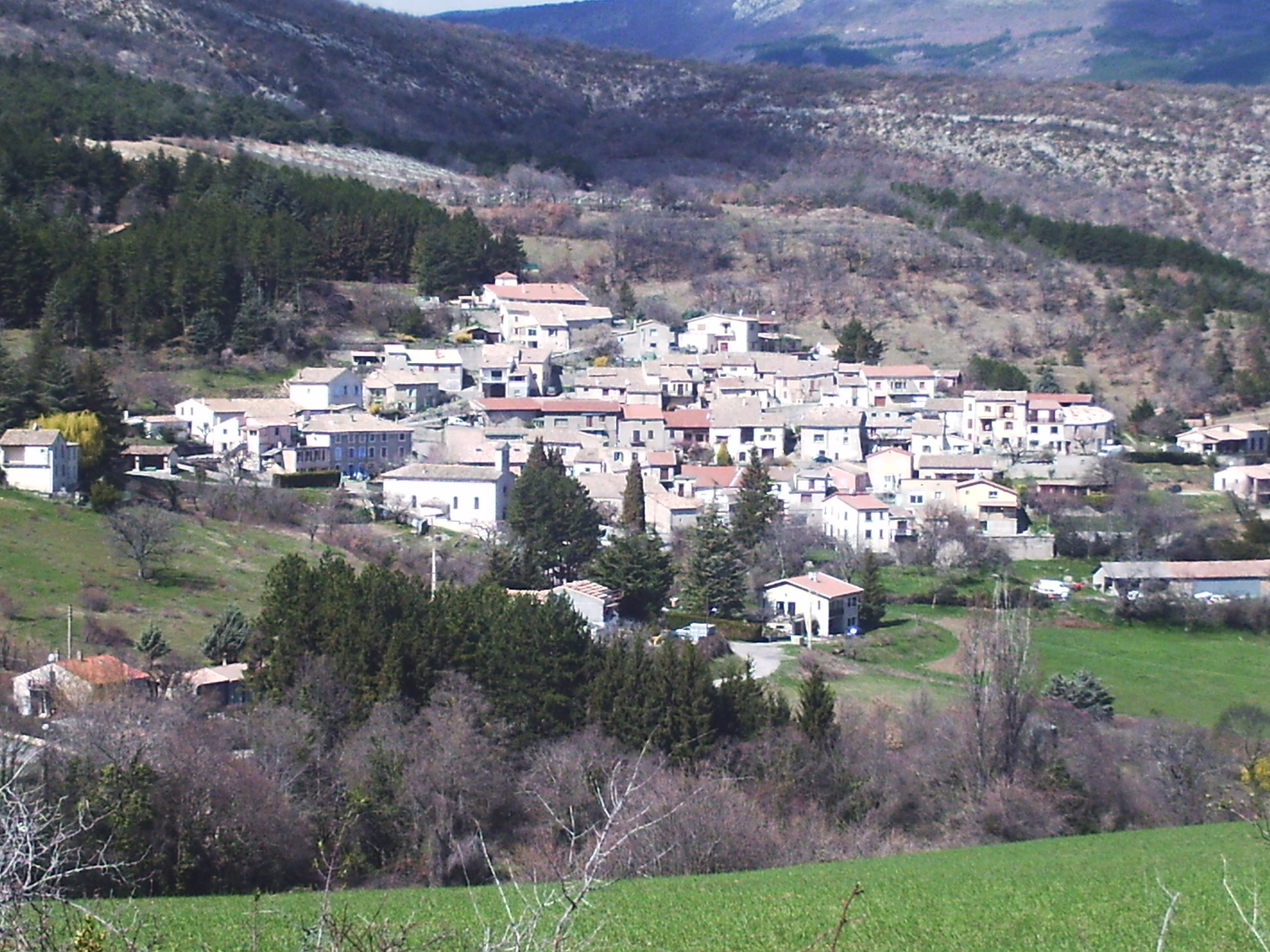
- A view of the village in Antonaves

- Coat of arms
- Location of Antonaves
- Location within France Location within Provence-Alpes-Côte d'Azur
- Coordinates: 44°16′02″N 5°48′20″E
- Country: France
- Region: Provence-Alpes-Côte d'Azur
- Department: Hautes-Alpes
- Arrondissement: Gap
- Canton: Ribiers
- Commune: Val Buëch-Méouge
- Area^{1}: 8.03 km^{2} (3.10 sq mi)
- Elevation: 625 m (2,051 ft)
- Highest elevation: 1,414 m (4,639 ft)
- Lowest elevation: 512 m (1,680 ft)
- Population (2023): 157
  - Density: 19.6/km^{2} (50.6/sq mi)
- Time zone: UTC+01:00 (CET)
  - Summer (DST): UTC+02:00 (CEST)
- Postal code: 05300
- ^{1} French Land Register data, which excludes lakes, ponds, glaciers > 1 km^{2} (0.386 sq mi or 247 acres) and river estuaries.

Antonaves (French pronunciation: [ɑ̃tɔnav]; Vivaro-Alpine: Antonavas) is a former commune of the Hautes-Alpes department in southeastern France. On 1 January 2016, it was merged into the new commune Val Buëch-Méouge. It is located at the confluence of the rivers Méouge and Buëch, and is known as the gateway to the Gorges de la Méouge, a 4 km limestone gorge.

== See also ==
- Communes of the Hautes-Alpes department
