= Le Poët =

- Commune
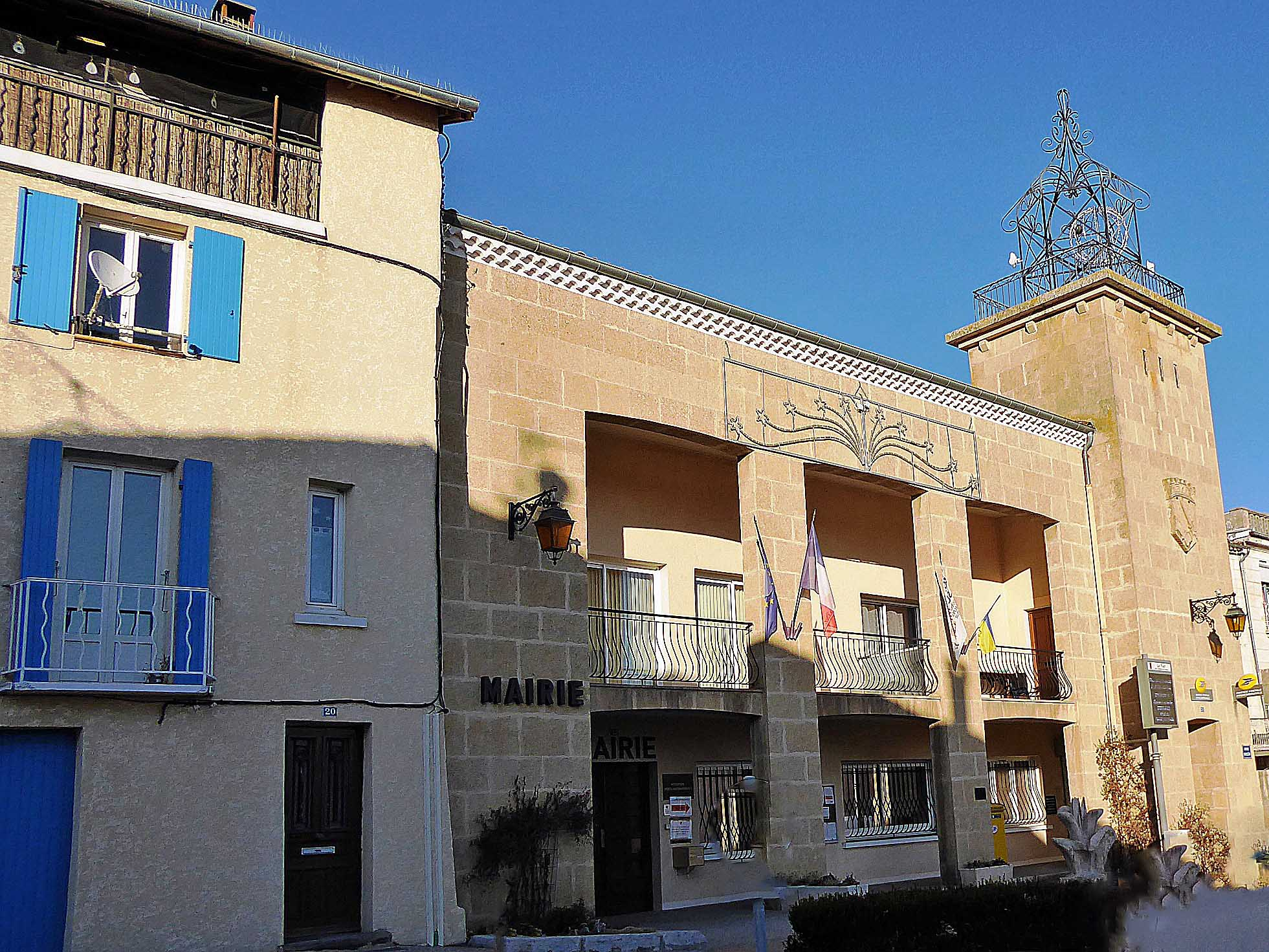
- Le Poët Town hall

- Coat of arms
- Location of Le Poët
- Location within France Location within Provence-Alpes-Côte d'Azur
- Coordinates: 44°17′38″N 5°53′51″E
- Country: France
- Region: Provence-Alpes-Côte d'Azur
- Department: Hautes-Alpes
- Arrondissement: Gap
- Canton: Laragne-Montéglin

Government
  - Mayor (2026–32): Geneviève Givaudan
- Area^{1}: 15.51 km^{2} (5.99 sq mi)
- Elevation: 585 m (1,919 ft)
- Highest elevation: 678 m (2,224 ft)
- Lowest elevation: 460 m (1,510 ft)
- Population (2023): 790
  - Density: 51/km^{2} (130/sq mi)
- Time zone: UTC+01:00 (CET)
  - Summer (DST): UTC+02:00 (CEST)
- INSEE/Postal code: 05103 /05300
- ^{1} French Land Register data, which excludes lakes, ponds, glaciers > 1 km^{2} (0.386 sq mi or 247 acres) and river estuaries.

Le Poët (Occitan: Lo Poèta) is a commune in the Hautes-Alpes department in southeastern France.

== Population ==
Historical population
| Year | Pop. | ±% p.a. |
|---|---|---|
| 1968 | 429 | — |
| 1975 | 511 | +2.53% |
| 1982 | 515 | +0.11% |
| 1990 | 587 | +1.65% |
| 1999 | 690 | +1.81% |
| 2007 | 741 | +0.90% |
| 2012 | 731 | −0.27% |
| 2017 | 798 | +1.77% |
| 2023 | 790 | −0.17% |
Source: INSEE

== See also ==
- Communes of the Hautes-Alpes department
- Vexillology of Hautes-Alpes
