= 1, 2, 3, Sun =

1993 film

- Theatrical release poster
- Directed by: Bertrand Blier
- Written by: Bertrand Blier
- Produced by: Patrice Ledoux
- Starring: Anouk Grinberg; Marcello Mastroianni; Jean-Pierre Marielle
- Cinematography: Gérard de Battista
- Edited by: Claudine Merlin
- Music by: Khaled
- Production companies: Gaumont; Ciné Valse; France 3 Cinéma
- Distributed by: Gaumont Buena Vista International
- Release date: 18 August 1993
- Running time: 104 minutes
- Country: France
- Language: French
- Budget: $9 million
- Box office: $3.1 million

1, 2, 3, Sun (French: Un, deux, trois, soleil) is a 1993 French surrealist black comedy film directed by Bertrand Blier. The title of the film corresponds to the French name for the "Statues" children's game.

== Plot ==
In an impoverished district of Marseille, full of tower blocks populated by people from many parts of Africa and elsewhere, Victorine is maturing with an inadequate mother and an alcoholic father, who keeps giving her half-brothers and half-sisters. She loves him nonetheless, wishing that he would give up drinking and remain home. Well aware of what puberty entails, she is being serially initiated in an abandoned car by a gang of unemployed youths when she cries out that the first time should have some affection and romance. In which case, they say, you need Petit Paul.

Treating her tenderly, he becomes her first love but his career as a burglar is cut short when he is shot by an enraged householder. After exposing herself to a solitary man on a train, he declares that he has fallen in love with her. This is Maurice, whose love never wavers and who marries her.

== Cast ==
- Anouk Grinberg as Victorine
- Myriam Boyer as Daniela Laspada (the mother)
- Olivier Martinez as Petit ("Little") Paul
- Jean-Michel Noirey as Maurice Le Garrec
- Denise Chalem as school teacher
- Jean-Pierre Marielle as the lonely man
- Éva Darlan as Jeanine
- Claude Brasseur as the bad guy
- Irène Tassembedo as Gladys Boigny
- Patrick Bouchitey as Marcel (the barkeeper)
- Marcello Mastroianni as Constantin Laspada (the father)
- Charles Schneider (actor) as Sergeant Boigny
