= Canton of Laragne-Montéglin =

Coordinates: 44°18′57″N 5°49′20″E

Laragne-Montéglin
- Canton
- Country: France
- Region: Provence-Alpes-Côte d'Azur
- Department: Hautes-Alpes
- No. of communes: {{{nbcomm}}}
- Area: 290.96 km^{2} (112.34 sq mi)
- Population (2023): 7,831
  - Density: 26.91/km^{2} (69.71/sq mi)
- INSEE code: 05 11

The canton of Laragne-Montéglin is an administrative division in southeastern France. At the French canton reorganisation which came into effect in March 2015, the canton was expanded from 7 to 13 communes (3 of which merged into the new commune Val Buëch-Méouge):

- Barret-sur-Méouge
- Éourres
- Laragne-Montéglin
- Lazer
- Monêtier-Allemont
- Le Poët
- Saint-Pierre-Avez
- Salérans
- Upaix
- Val Buëch-Méouge
- Ventavon

== Demographics ==
Historical population
Year	Pop.	±% p.a.
2013	7,627	—
2018	7,807	+0.47%
Source: INSEE

== See also ==
- Cantons of the Hautes-Alpes department
- Communes of France
