= Châteauneuf-de-Chabre =

- Part of Val Buëch-Méouge
- Location of Châteauneuf-de-Chabre
- Location within France Location within Provence-Alpes-Côte d'Azur
- Coordinates: 44°17′01″N 5°49′13″E
- Country: France
- Region: Provence-Alpes-Côte d'Azur
- Department: Hautes-Alpes
- Arrondissement: Gap
- Canton: Ribiers
- Commune: Val Buëch-Méouge
- Area^{1}: 23.9 km^{2} (9.2 sq mi)
- Elevation: 525 m (1,722 ft)
- Highest elevation: 1,352 m (4,436 ft)
- Lowest elevation: 514 m (1,686 ft)
- Population (2023): 385
  - Density: 16.1/km^{2} (41.7/sq mi)
- Time zone: UTC+01:00 (CET)
  - Summer (DST): UTC+02:00 (CEST)
- Postal code: 05300
- ^{1} French Land Register data, which excludes lakes, ponds, glaciers > 1 km^{2} (0.386 sq mi or 247 acres) and river estuaries.

Châteauneuf-de-Chabre (French: [ʃɑtonœf də ʃabʁ]; Vivaro-Alpine: Chasteunòu de Chabra) is a former commune in the Hautes-Alpes department in southeastern France. On 1 January 2016, it was merged into the new commune Val Buëch-Méouge.

== See also ==
- Communes of the Hautes-Alpes department
