= Éourres =

- Commune
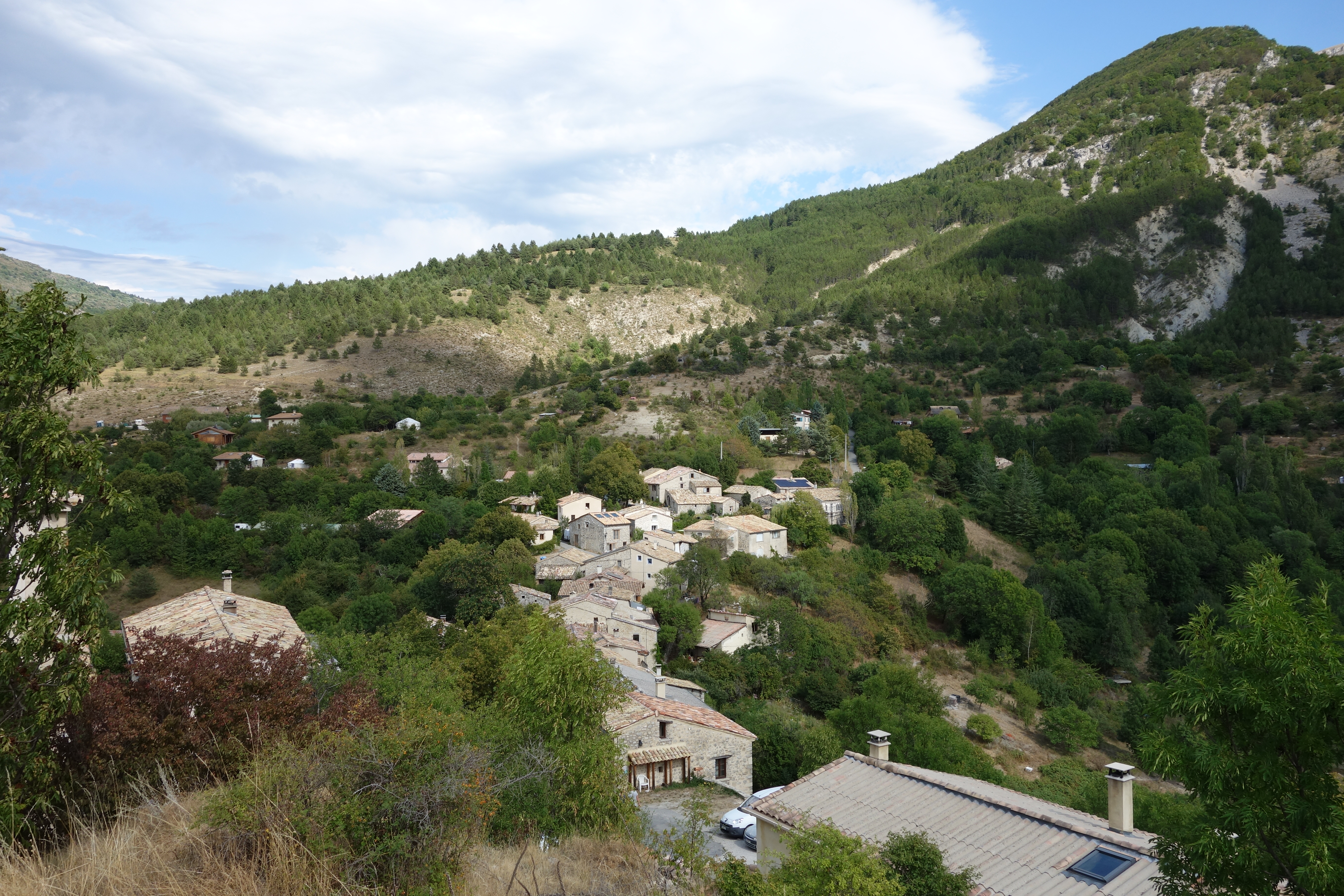
- Location of Éourres
- Location within France Location within Provence-Alpes-Côte d'Azur
- Coordinates: 44°12′47″N 5°42′00″E
- Country: France
- Region: Provence-Alpes-Côte d'Azur
- Department: Hautes-Alpes
- Arrondissement: Gap
- Canton: Laragne-Montéglin

Government
  - Mayor (2026–32): Nathalie De Bruyne
- Area^{1}: 26.47 km^{2} (10.22 sq mi)
- Elevation: 980 m (3,220 ft)
- Highest elevation: 1,613 m (5,292 ft)
- Lowest elevation: 759 m (2,490 ft)
- Population (2023): 151
  - Density: 5.70/km^{2} (14.8/sq mi)
- Time zone: UTC+01:00 (CET)
  - Summer (DST): UTC+02:00 (CEST)
- INSEE/Postal code: 05047 /05300
- ^{1} French Land Register data, which excludes lakes, ponds, glaciers > 1 km^{2} (0.386 sq mi or 247 acres) and river estuaries.

Éourres (French pronunciation: [euʁ]; Occitan: Eüras) is a commune in the Hautes-Alpes department in southeastern France.

== Population ==
Historical population
| Year | Pop. | ±% p.a. |
|---|---|---|
| 1968 | 28 | — |
| 1975 | 28 | +0.00% |
| 1982 | 22 | −3.39% |
| 1990 | 73 | +16.17% |
| 1999 | 85 | +1.71% |
| 2007 | 128 | +5.25% |
| 2012 | 134 | +0.92% |
| 2017 | 137 | +0.44% |
| 2023 | 151 | +1.63% |
Source: INSEE

== See also ==
- Communes of the Hautes-Alpes department
