= Barret-sur-Méouge =

- Commune
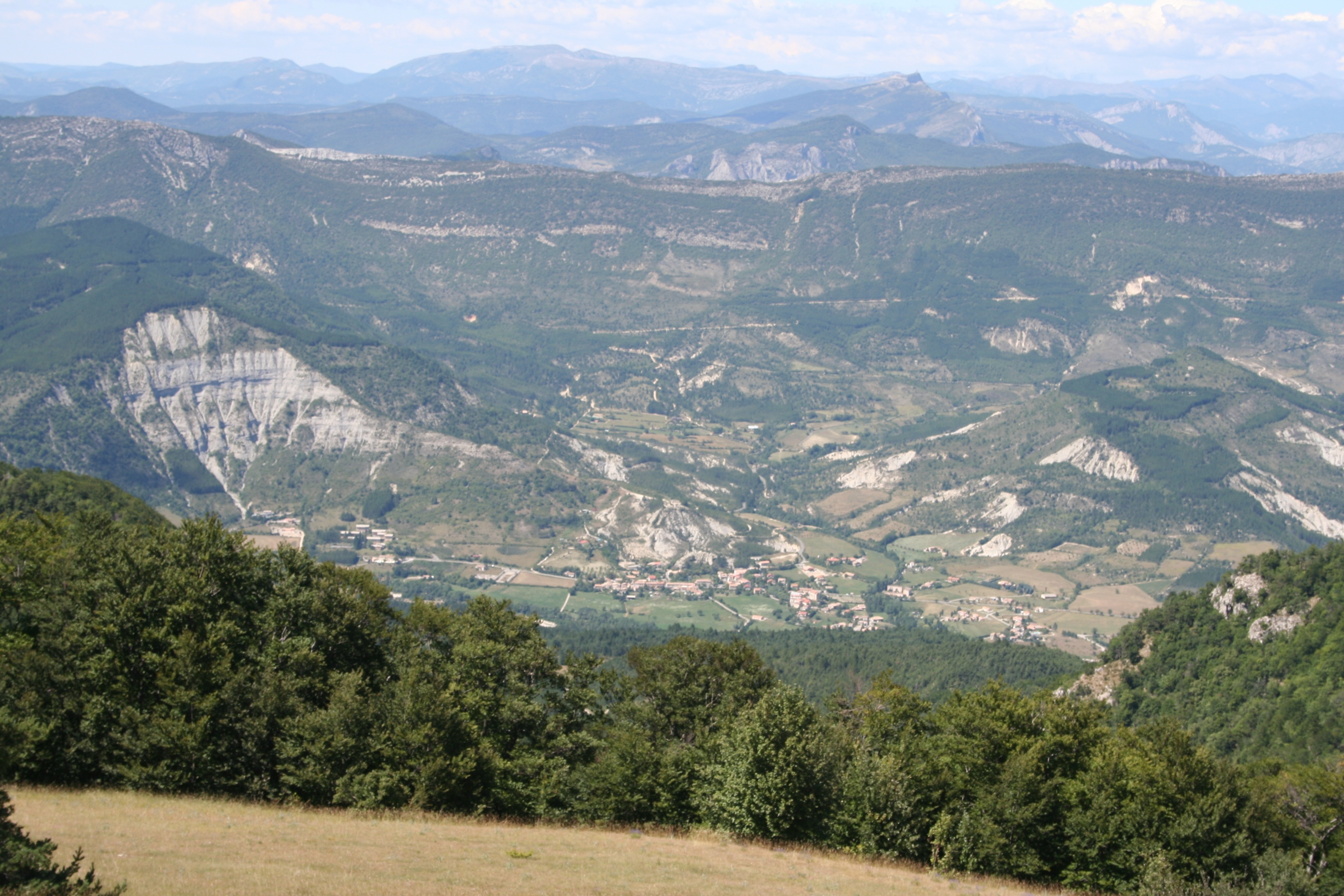
- The village seen from the Col de Branche
- Location of Barret-sur-Méouge
- Location within France Location within Provence-Alpes-Côte d'Azur
- Coordinates: 44°15′48″N 5°44′03″E
- Country: France
- Region: Provence-Alpes-Côte d'Azur
- Department: Hautes-Alpes
- Arrondissement: Gap
- Canton: Laragne-Montéglin

Government
  - Mayor (2026–32): Bruno Lagier
- Area^{1}: 26.72 km^{2} (10.32 sq mi)
- Elevation: 649 m (2,129 ft)
- Highest elevation: 1,555 m (5,102 ft)
- Lowest elevation: 592 m (1,942 ft)
- Population (2023): 193
  - Density: 7.22/km^{2} (18.7/sq mi)
- Time zone: UTC+01:00 (CET)
  - Summer (DST): UTC+02:00 (CEST)
- INSEE/Postal code: 05014 /05300
- ^{1} French Land Register data, which excludes lakes, ponds, glaciers > 1 km^{2} (0.386 sq mi or 247 acres) and river estuaries.

Barret-sur-Méouge (French pronunciation: [baʁɛ syʁ meuʒ], literally Barret on Méouge; Occitan: Barret sus Meüja, before 2001: Barret-le-Bas) is a commune in the Hautes-Alpes department in southeastern France. It is located at the start of the 'Gorges de la Méouge' on the Méouge river.

== Population ==
Historical population
| Year | Pop. | ±% p.a. |
|---|---|---|
| 1968 | 342 | — |
| 1975 | 291 | −2.28% |
| 1982 | 187 | −6.12% |
| 1990 | 237 | +3.01% |
| 1999 | 232 | −0.24% |
| 2007 | 213 | −1.06% |
| 2012 | 233 | +1.81% |
| 2017 | 220 | −1.14% |
| 2023 | 193 | −2.16% |
Source: INSEE

== See also ==
- Communes of the Hautes-Alpes department
