= The Horseman on the Roof (novel) =

1951 book by Jean Giono

The Horseman on the Roof (orig. French Le Hussard sur le toit) is a 1951 adventure novel by French writer Jean Giono. It tells the story of Angelo Pardi, a young Italian carbonaro colonel of hussars, caught up in the 1832 cholera epidemic in Provence.

In 1995, it was made into a film of the same name directed by Jean-Paul Rappeneau.

== See also ==
- Le Monde's 100 Books of the Century
