= Norma Lorre Goodrich =

American writer and professor (1917–2006)

Norma Therese Falby
- Born: May 10, 1917; Huntington, Vermont
- Died: September 19, 2006 (aged 89); Claremont, California
- Other name: Norma Lorre Goodrich
- Education: Columbia University
- Occupations: Author, English and French professor
- Notable work: King Arthur (1986)
- Spouses: Joseph Lorre (div. 1946) John Howard (m. 1964; died 1995)

Norma Therese Falby (May 10, 1917 – September 19, 2006) — pen name Norma Lorre Goodrich — was an American professor of French, comparative literature and writing who taught in the University of Southern California and Claremont Colleges for 45 years and published several popular books on Arthuriana.

Goodrich was noted for her thesis, first presented in a 1986 book titled King Arthur, that the legendary monarch was not a myth, but a real person, who lived not in England or Wales, as conventionally understood, but in Scotland. In her interpretation, Queen Guinevere was a Pictish queen, and Sir Lancelot a Scottish king. Her methodology involved back-translating Latin place names found in Geoffrey of Monmouth’s Historia Regum Britanniae to what she believed to be their Celtic originals. Her findings have not been accepted by Galfridian scholars.

== Discussion of her work ==
In 1986, she held the post professor emerita at the Claremont Colleges and told a Los Angeles Times reporter that she had discovered a void in Arthurian scholarship: “All the books on Arthur have been on the mythology, the legend,” but not the history. (Of course, this was not true; many books had already investigated the “historical Arthur”.) Goodrich traveled extensively in Britain and France and laid claim to having mastered several ancient and modern languages. She claimed that the 12th century pseudo-historian, Geoffrey of Monmouth thought that Arthur had been in Scotland, not England, hiding this by naming Arthur's battles in Latin rather than Scots Gaelic. “When I finally figured out what he was doing, I translated the Latin back into Gaelic,” Goodrich told the Riverside Press-Enterprise in 1994. She then found that the names coincided with places in Scotland. (The conventional view has always been that Geoffrey was describing places in southwestern England or Wales.) She claimed that Guinevere was a Pictish queen and Lancelot a Scottish king.

Rosemary Morris's review of King Arthur in the journal Albion found Goodrich's work to be

“uneven and erratic…. It is so fundamentally unsound that one would take it as an elaborate joke.... For an Arthurian expert, reading this book is a nightmare: familiar details are there, but in the grossest confusion. Even a non-initiate will probably find that the book denounces itself by innumerable inconsistencies and logical absurdities…. She claims to be a specialist on the written texts (p. 27), whose difficulty she greatly exaggerates…. In linguistics she is lost.... Professor Goodrich regularly mangles the history, literature, and language both of the Dark Ages (which she does nothing to illuminate) and of the High Middle Ages (which she totally fails to understand). But modern critics fare no better. If they agree (?) with her, they are "brilliant," but if they "disagree" they are insulted....”

Reviewing "Heroines", noting that the book is mainly useful for anyone interested in her views, A. J. Sobczak wrote:

The book lacks an overarching theme, consisting primarily of plot summaries of major myths and works of fiction, focusing on the actions of female characters. Many of these summaries will mean little to someone not familiar with the myth or book in question, as they illustrate isolated incidents rather than showing how broad themes develop. The telling is not aided by Goodrich’s literary form, which consists of unwieldy, convoluted sentences that all too often do not follow the rules of grammar.

== Final years ==
Her husband John died in February 1995 at the age of 77. Goodrich died on September 19, 2006, of natural causes at her home in Claremont, California. Her obituary in the Los Angeles Times stated that "the fact that her King Arthur findings contradicted those of other scholars did not trouble Goodrich".

== Works ==
- Myths of the Hero (1960)
- The Ancient Myths (1960; PB: Mentor, New American Library)
- Medieval Myths
  - Revised/expanded edition (1977)
- Le Morte D'Arthur, abridged and introduced by Norma Lorre Goodrich (1963; Washington Square Press)
- Charles, Duke of Orleans: Poet and Prince (1963; Macmillan Company)
- The Ways of Love: Eleven Romances of Medieval France (1965; George Allen & Unwin)
- Charles of Orleans: A Study of His French and His English Poetry (1967; Geneva: Libraire Droz)
- Giono: Master of Fictional Modes (1973; Princeton University Press)
- King Arthur (1986)
- Priestesses (1989)
- Merlin (1987; PB 1989: HarperPerennial)
- Guinevere (1992, Franklin Watts; PB: HarperPerennial)
- The Holy Grail (1992, HarperCollins)
- Heroines: Demigoddess, Prima Donna, Movie Star (1994)
- The Doctor and Maria Theresa
- Charlemagne
- The Jungle of Academe: The Poetry of Norma Lorre Goodrich (2013; Compiled by Andrew Whitenack)
