= Ventavon =

- Commune
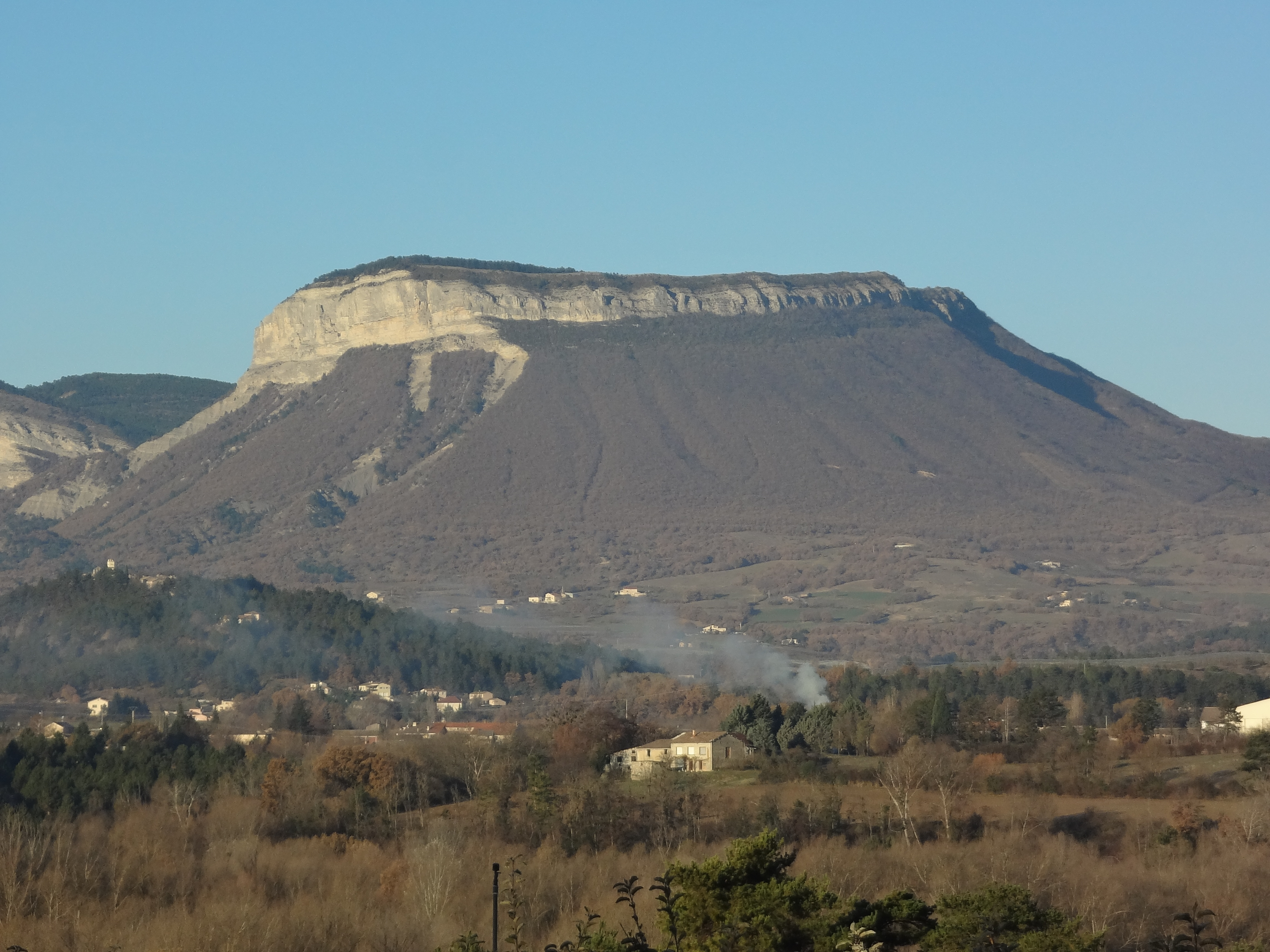
- The Montagne de Saint-Genis seen from Ventavon

- Coat of arms
- Location of Ventavon
- Location within France Location within Provence-Alpes-Côte d'Azur
- Coordinates: 44°22′18″N 5°54′23″E
- Country: France
- Region: Provence-Alpes-Côte d'Azur
- Department: Hautes-Alpes
- Arrondissement: Gap
- Canton: Laragne-Montéglin

Government
  - Mayor (2026–32): Jean-Claude Favier
- Area^{1}: 42.69 km^{2} (16.48 sq mi)
- Elevation: 685 m (2,247 ft)
- Highest elevation: 1,422 m (4,665 ft)
- Lowest elevation: 503 m (1,650 ft)
- Population (2023): 540
  - Density: 13/km^{2} (33/sq mi)
- Time zone: UTC+01:00 (CET)
  - Summer (DST): UTC+02:00 (CEST)
- INSEE/Postal code: 05178 /05300
- ^{1} French Land Register data, which excludes lakes, ponds, glaciers > 1 km^{2} (0.386 sq mi or 247 acres) and river estuaries.

Ventavon is a commune in the Hautes-Alpes department in southeastern France.

== Population ==
Historical population
Year	Pop.	±% p.a.
1968	396	—
1975	392	−0.14%
1982	362	−1.13%
1990	398	+1.19%
1999	456	+1.52%
2007	503	+1.23%
2012	498	−0.20%
2017	575	+2.92%
2023	540	−1.04%
Source: INSEE

== See also ==
- Communes of the Hautes-Alpes department
