= Salérans =

Administrative division in Provence-Alpes-Côte d'Azur, France

- Commune
- Coat of arms
- Location of Salérans
- Location within France Location within Provence-Alpes-Côte d'Azur
- Coordinates: 44°14′38″N 5°42′20″E
- Country: France
- Region: Provence-Alpes-Côte d'Azur
- Department: Hautes-Alpes
- Arrondissement: Gap
- Canton: Laragne-Montéglin

Government
  - Mayor (2026–32): Eric Deguillame
- Area^{1}: 13.9 km^{2} (5.4 sq mi)
- Elevation: 714 m (2,343 ft)
- Highest elevation: 1,526 m (5,007 ft)
- Lowest elevation: 648 m (2,126 ft)
- Population (2023): 78
  - Density: 5.6/km^{2} (15/sq mi)
- Time zone: UTC+01:00 (CET)
  - Summer (DST): UTC+02:00 (CEST)
- INSEE/Postal code: 05160 /05300
- ^{1} French Land Register data, which excludes lakes, ponds, glaciers > 1 km^{2} (0.386 sq mi or 247 acres) and river estuaries.

Salérans is a commune in the Hautes-Alpes department in southeastern France.

== Population ==
Historical population
| Year | Pop. | ±% p.a. |
|---|---|---|
| 1968 | 52 | — |
| 1975 | 61 | +2.31% |
| 1982 | 37 | −6.89% |
| 1990 | 54 | +4.84% |
| 1999 | 83 | +4.89% |
| 2007 | 77 | −0.93% |
| 2012 | 97 | +4.73% |
| 2017 | 90 | −1.49% |
| 2023 | 78 | −2.36% |
Source: INSEE

== See also ==
- Communes of the Hautes-Alpes department
