= Saint-Pierre-Avez =

- Commune
- Coat of arms
- Location of Saint-Pierre-Avez
- Location within France Location within Provence-Alpes-Côte d'Azur
- Coordinates: 44°15′29″N 5°45′42″E
- Country: France
- Region: Provence-Alpes-Côte d'Azur
- Department: Hautes-Alpes
- Arrondissement: Gap
- Canton: Laragne-Montéglin

Government
  - Mayor (2026–32): Alain Laugier
- Area^{1}: 11.37 km^{2} (4.39 sq mi)
- Elevation: 750 m (2,460 ft)
- Highest elevation: 1,480 m (4,860 ft)
- Lowest elevation: 610 m (2,000 ft)
- Population (2023): 35
  - Density: 3.1/km^{2} (8.0/sq mi)
- Demonym: Saint-Pierre-Avéziens
- Time zone: UTC+01:00 (CET)
  - Summer (DST): UTC+02:00 (CEST)
- INSEE/Postal code: 05155 /05300
- ^{1} French Land Register data, which excludes lakes, ponds, glaciers > 1 km^{2} (0.386 sq mi or 247 acres) and river estuaries.

Saint-Pierre-Avez (Vivaro-Alpine: Sant Peire Avez) is a commune in the Hautes-Alpes department in southeastern France.

== Population ==
Historical population
| Year | Pop. | ±% p.a. |
|---|---|---|
| 1968 | 30 | — |
| 1975 | 28 | −0.98% |
| 1982 | 14 | −9.43% |
| 1990 | 20 | +4.56% |
| 1999 | 24 | +2.05% |
| 2007 | 24 | +0.00% |
| 2012 | 32 | +5.92% |
| 2017 | 29 | −1.95% |
| 2023 | 35 | +3.18% |
Source: INSEE

== See also ==
- Communes of the Hautes-Alpes department
