= 39th Academy Awards =

- Date: April 10, 1967
- Site: Santa Monica Civic Auditorium, Santa Monica, California
- Hosted by: Bob Hope
- Produced by: Joe Pasternak
- Directed by: Richard Dunlap

Highlights
- Best Picture: A Man for All Seasons
- Most awards: A Man for All Seasons (6)
- Most nominations: Who's Afraid of Virginia Woolf? (13)

TV in the United States
- Network: ABC
- Duration: 2 hours, 31 minutes

The 39th Academy Awards, honoring the best in film for 1966, were held on April 10, 1967, hosted by Bob Hope at the Santa Monica Civic Auditorium in Santa Monica, California.

The Academy Awards broadcast faced the threat of cancellation due to a strike involving the American Federation of Television and Radio Artists. The dispute was resolved just three hours before the ceremony was set to begin. Bob Hope, during his opening monologue, alluded to this uncertainty, noting that even as late as 30 minutes before the event, it was still unclear whether the telecast would proceed.

In a rare occurrence during the period with five Best Picture nominees, only two were nominated for Best Director this year: Fred Zinnemann for A Man for All Seasons (the winner) and Mike Nichols for Who's Afraid of Virginia Woolf?. The latter was the second film in Oscars history to be nominated in every eligible category (after Cimarron (1931)), as well as the first of three to date to receive acting nominations for the entire credited cast.

For the second time in Oscars history, two siblings were nominated in the same category: Vanessa and Lynn Redgrave, both nominated for Best Actress for their performances in Morgan! and Georgy Girl, respectively. This had previously occurred in 1941, when sisters Joan Fontaine and Olivia de Havilland were each nominated for Best Actress.

Elizabeth Taylor was informed of her having won the Best Actress award in London, but was so frustrated by Richard Burton's loss of the Best Actor award that she refused to hold a press conference for two weeks.

Six films won multiple Oscars this year—A Man for All Seasons, Who's Afraid of Virginia Woolf?, Grand Prix, Fantastic Voyage, A Man and a Woman, and Born Free—a record that was later tied in 2010, 2012, and 2017, and surpassed in 2020/21, when seven films won at least two Oscars. Every Best Picture nominee was nominated for Best Actor as well, the only time in the era of five Best Picture nominees that each nominated film received a nomination in a single acting category.

Uniquely, this year marked the only instance in the history of the Academy Awards where all nominees for Best Actress were born outside the United States. Among the audience was Patricia Neal, who had not made a Hollywood appearance since she suffered a near-fatal stroke two years prior, and she received a standing ovation from the crowd. California's governor at the time, Ronald Reagan, also attended the ceremony, having been a longtime member and supporter of the Academy.

Additionally, this event marked the final year in which separate awards were presented for black-and-white and color films in categories such as Cinematography, Art Direction-Set Decoration, and Costume Design. One standout moment in the broadcast was Mitzi Gaynor's performance of the song "Georgy Girl," which is frequently hailed as one of the most celebrated performances in Oscar history.

== Winners and nominees ==
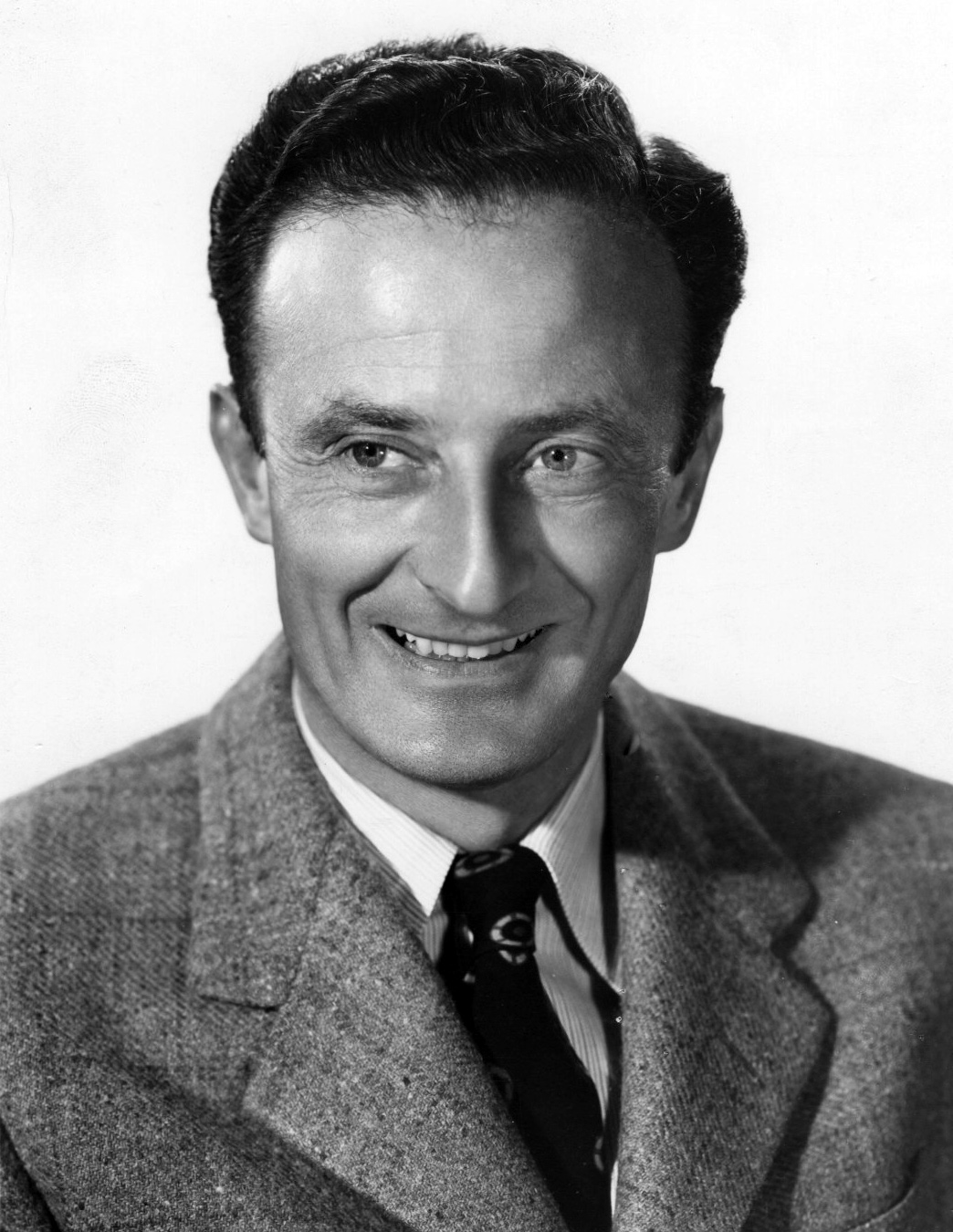
Fred Zinnemann, Best Director and Best Picture winner

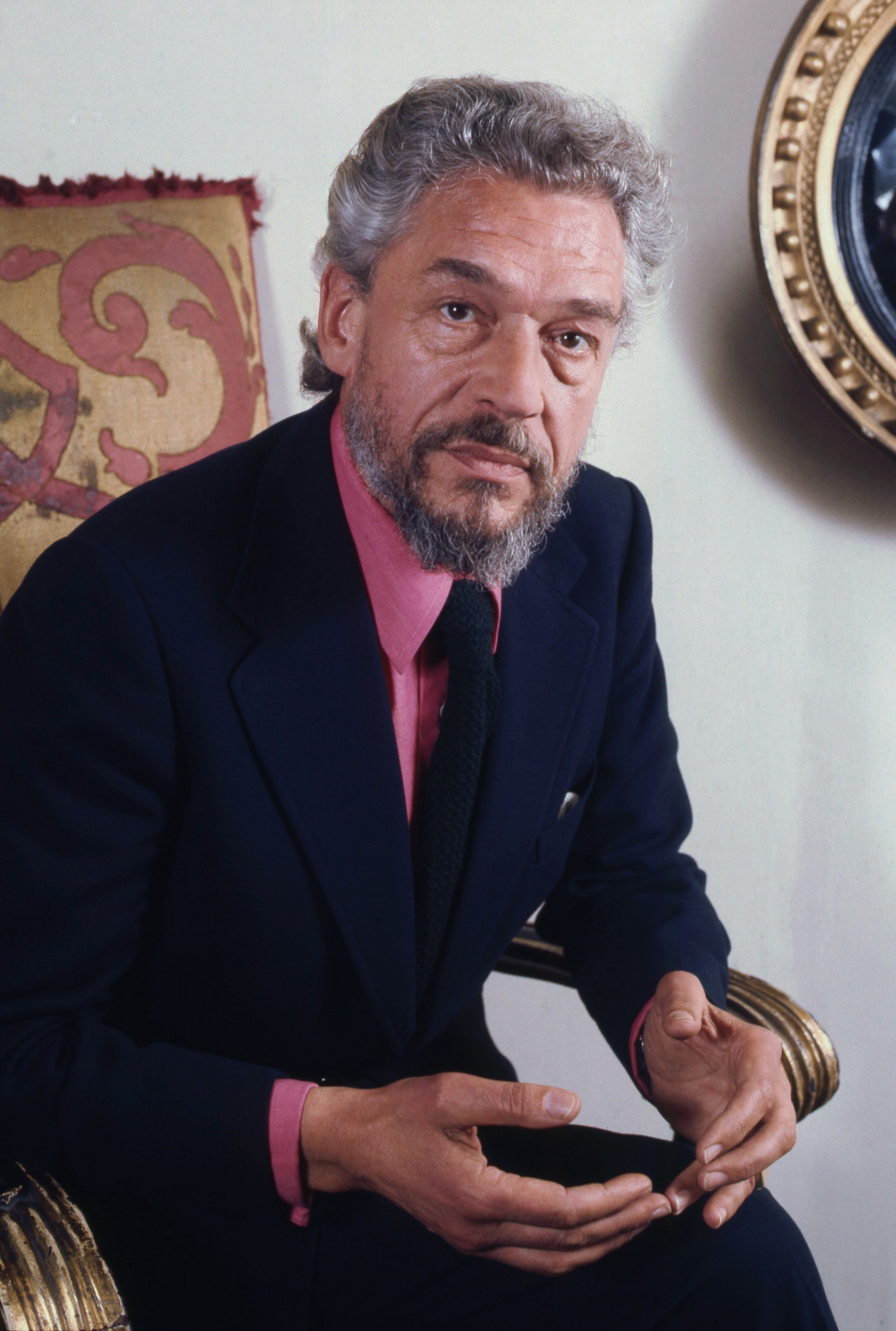
Paul Scofield, Best Actor winner

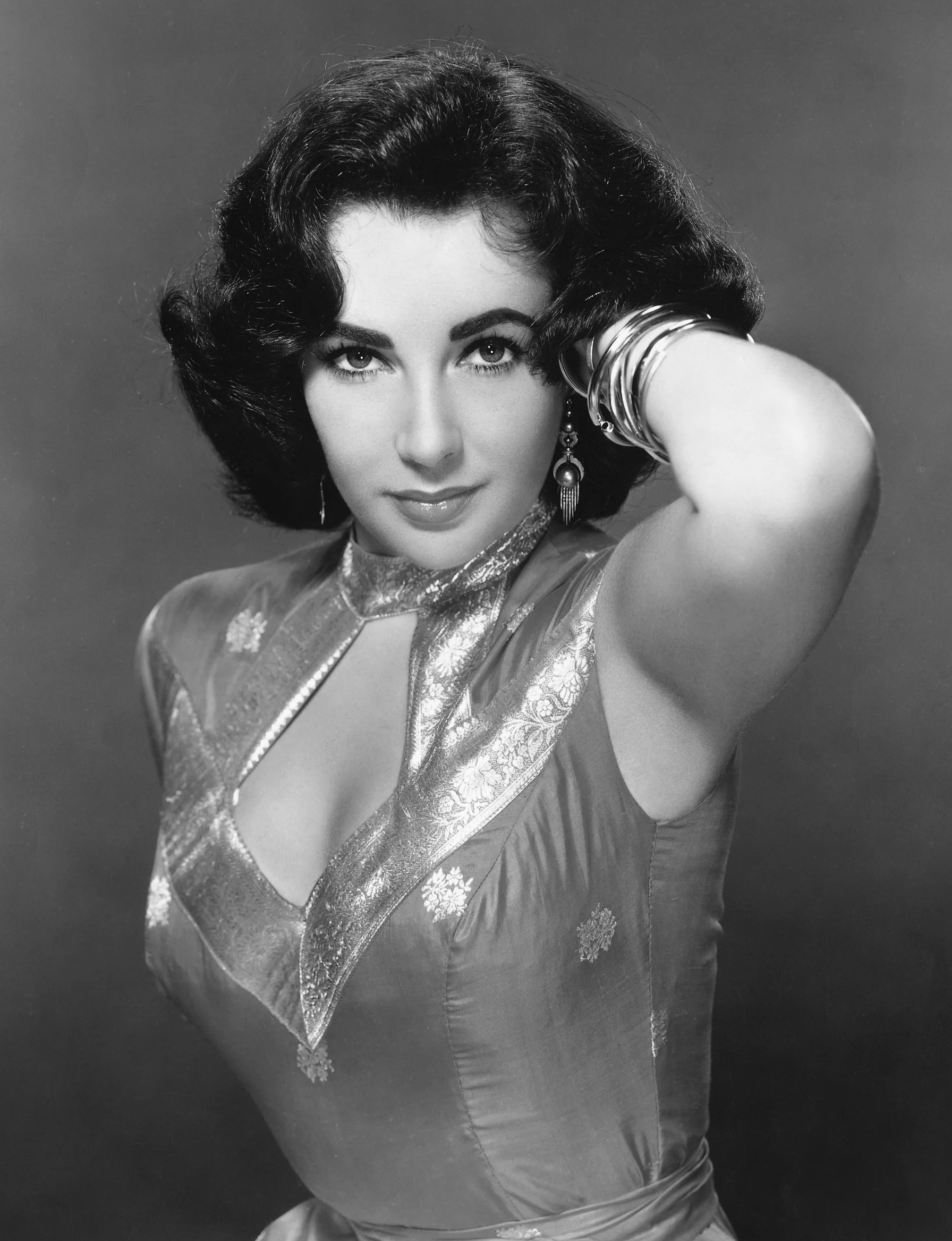
Elizabeth Taylor, Best Actress winner

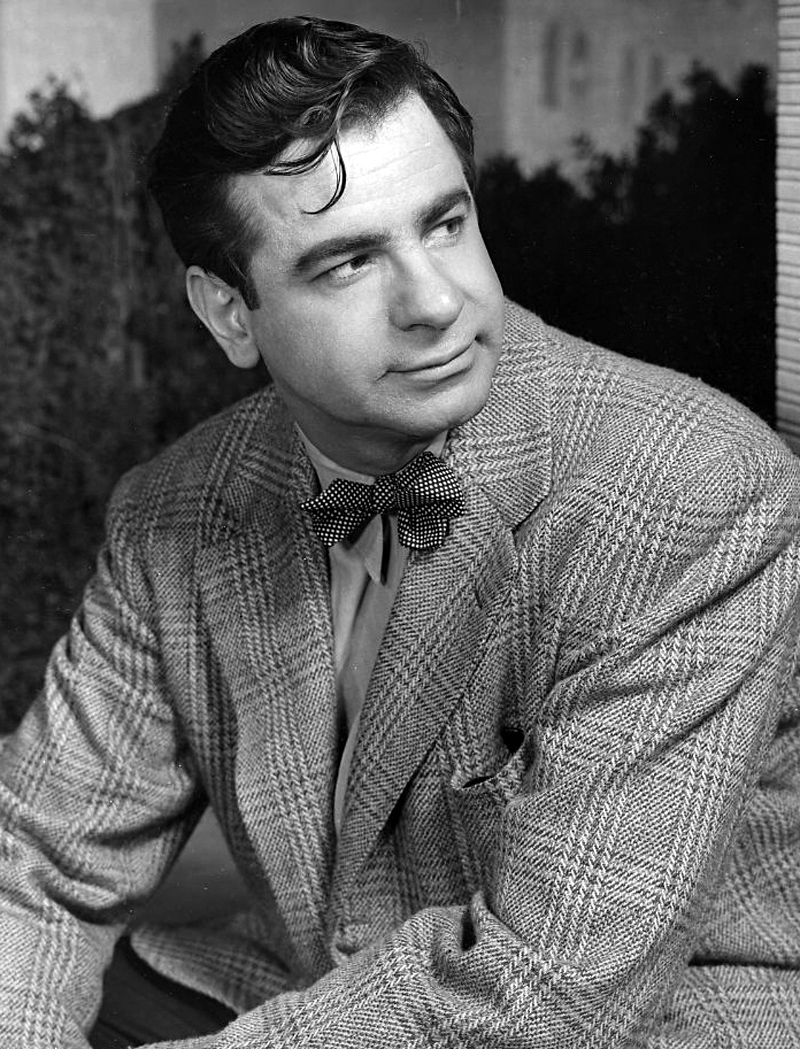
Walter Matthau, Best Supporting Actor winner

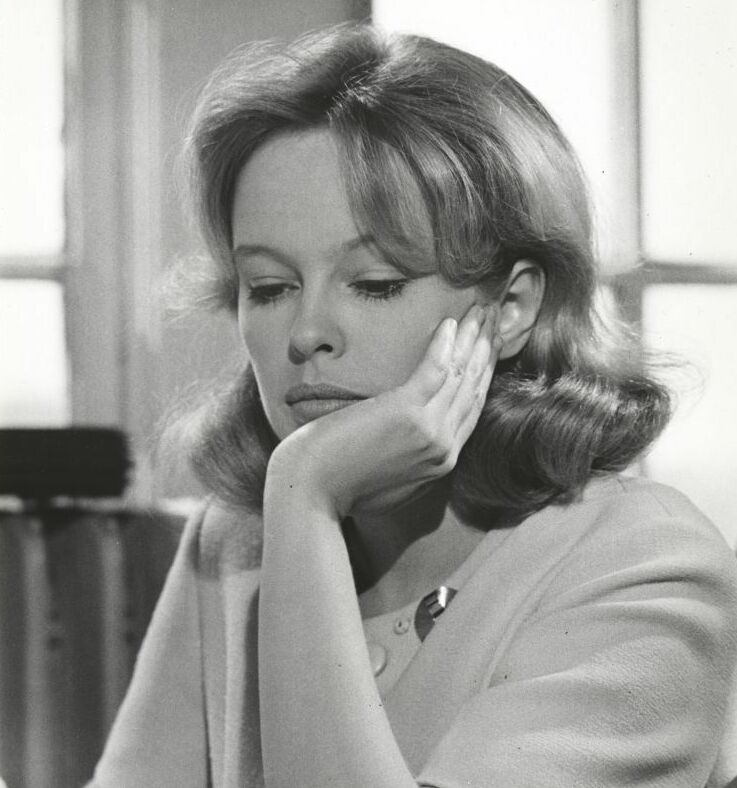
Sandy Dennis, Best Supporting Actress winner

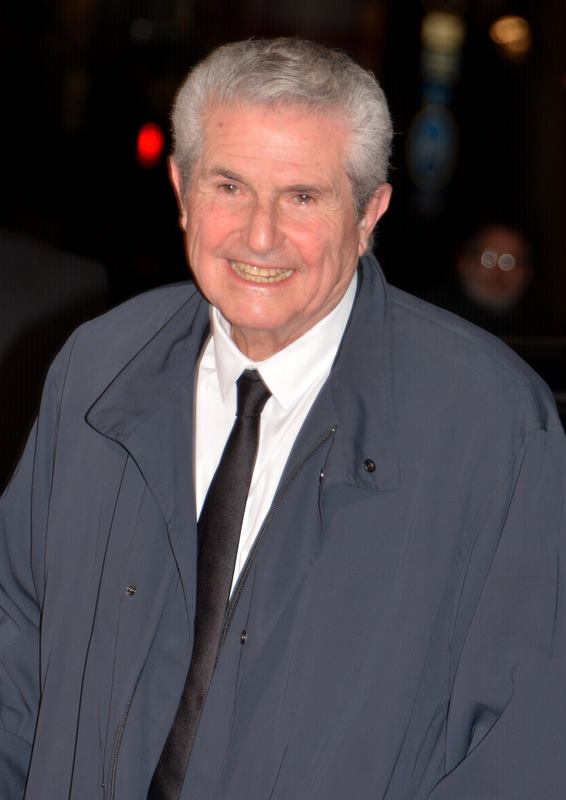
Claude Lelouch, Best Original Screenplay co-winner

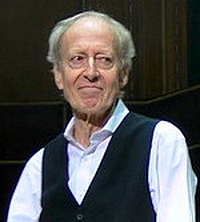
John Barry, Best Original Score winner and Best Original Song co-winner

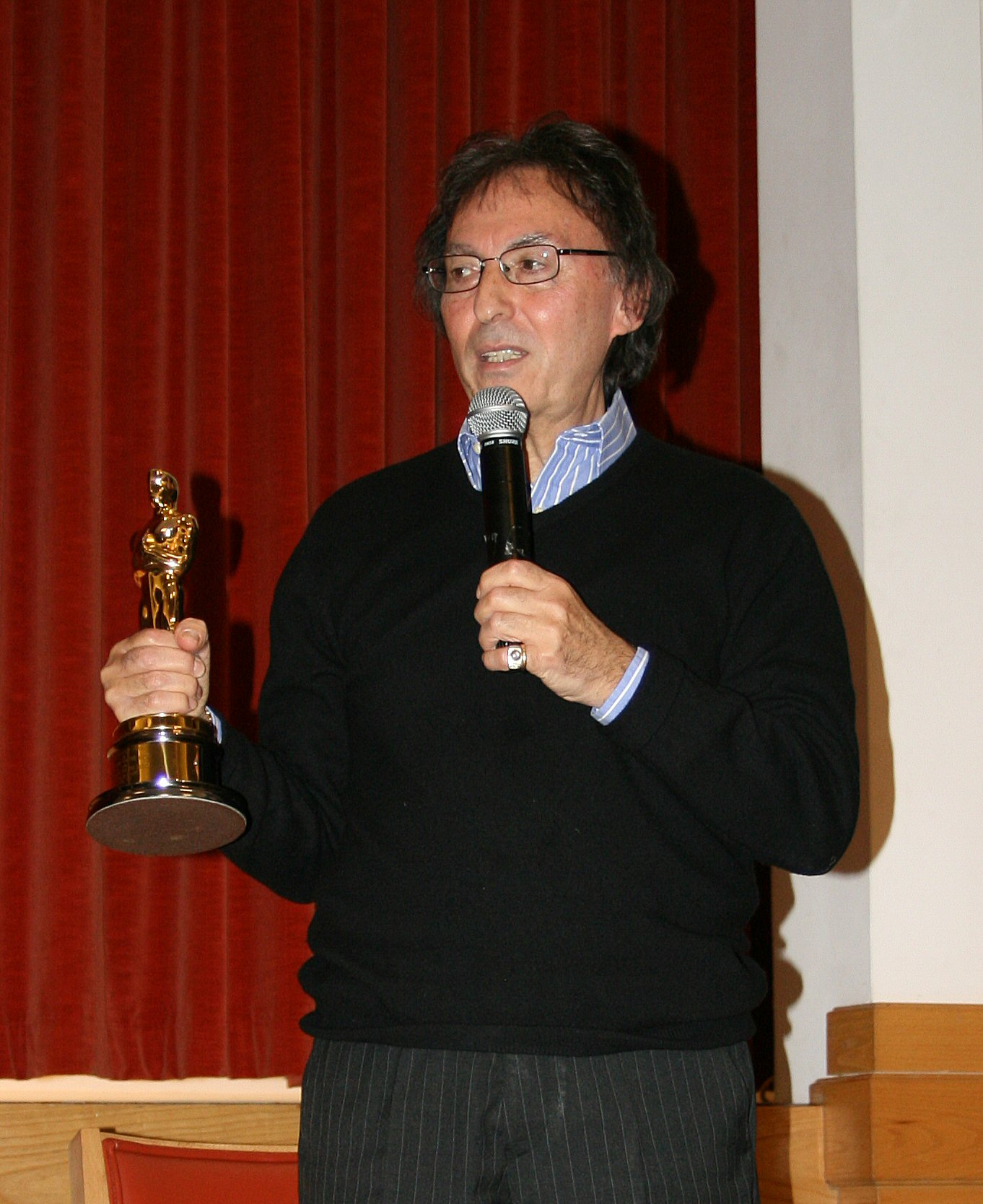
Don Black, Best Original Song co-winner

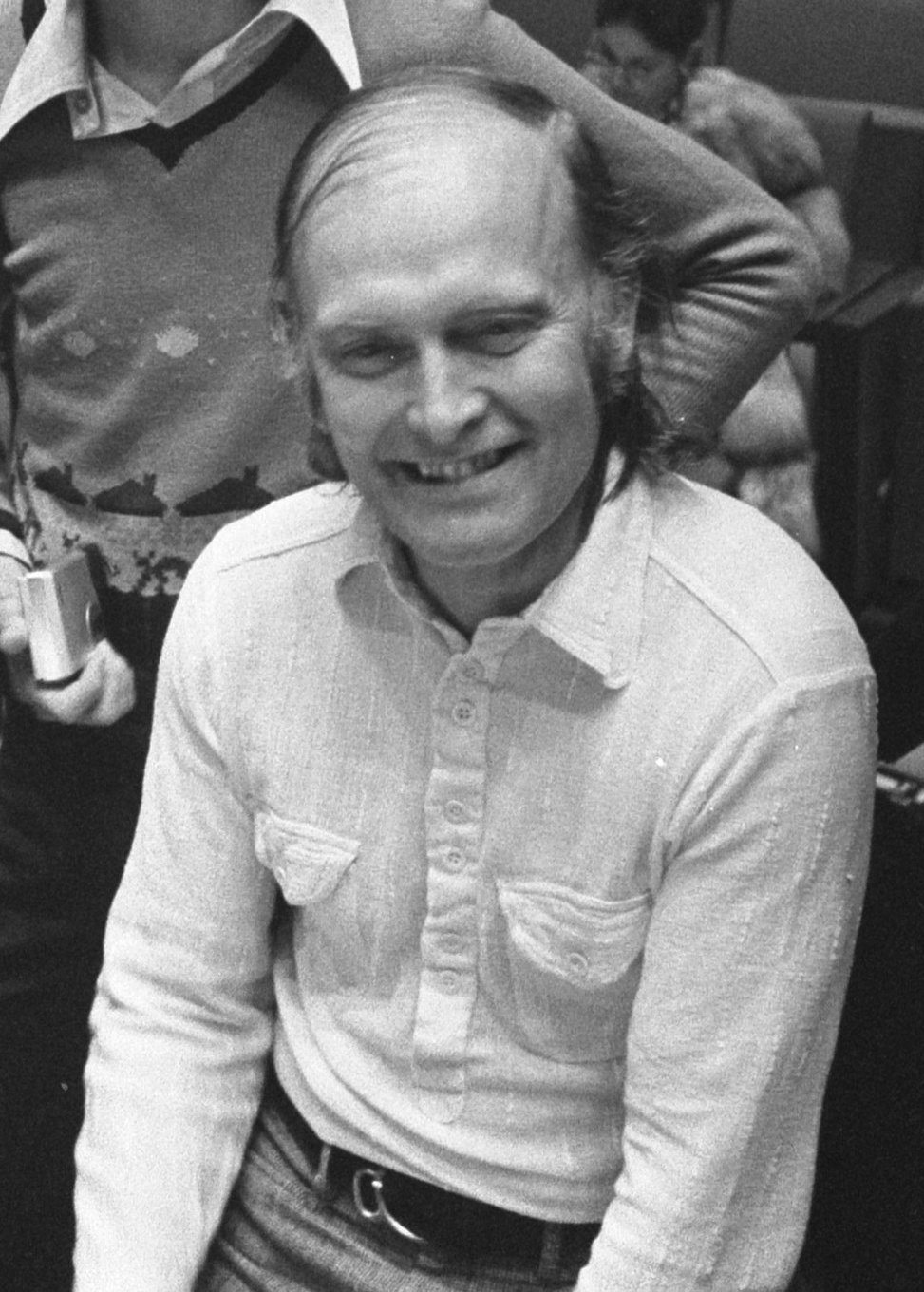
Ken Thorne, Best Adapted Score winner

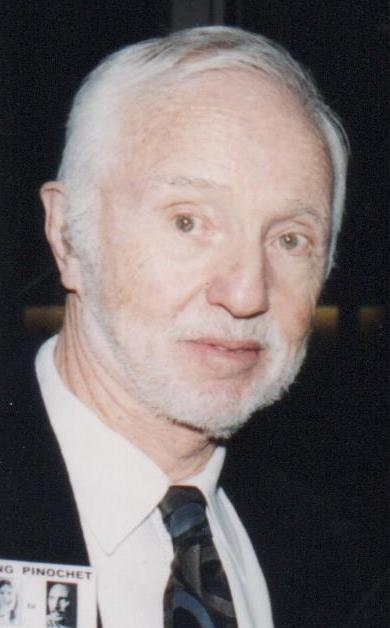
Haskell Wexler, Best Cinematography (Black & White) winner

Nominees were announced on February 20, 1967. Winners are listed first and highlighted in boldface.

**Best Picture**: **A Man for All Seasons – Fred Zinnemann, producer**; Alfie – Lewis Gilbert, producer; The Russians Are Coming, the Russians Are Coming – Norman Jewison, producer; The Sand Pebbles – Robert Wise, producer; Who's Afraid of Virginia Woolf? – Ernest Lehman, producer	**Best Directing**: **Fred Zinnemann – A Man for All Seasons**; Michelangelo Antonioni – Blowup; Claude Lelouch – A Man and a Woman; Richard Brooks – The Professionals; Mike Nichols – Who's Afraid of Virginia Woolf?
**Best Actor**: **Paul Scofield – A Man for All Seasons as Sir Thomas More**; Alan Arkin – The Russians Are Coming, the Russians Are Coming as Lt. Yuri Rozanov; Richard Burton – Who's Afraid of Virginia Woolf? as George; Michael Caine – Alfie as Alfie Elkins; Steve McQueen – The Sand Pebbles as Jake Holman	**Best Actress**: **Elizabeth Taylor – Who's Afraid of Virginia Woolf? as Martha**; Anouk Aimée – A Man and a Woman as Anne Gauthier; Ida Kamińska – The Shop on Main Street as Rozália Lautmannová; Lynn Redgrave – Georgy Girl as Georgina "Georgy" Parkin; Vanessa Redgrave – Morgan! as Leonie Delt
**Best Actor in a Supporting Role**: **Walter Matthau – The Fortune Cookie as "Whiplash Willie" Gingrich**; Mako – The Sand Pebbles as Po-han; James Mason – Georgy Girl as James Leamington; George Segal – Who's Afraid of Virginia Woolf? as Nick; Robert Shaw – A Man for All Seasons as King Henry VIII	**Best Actress in a Supporting Role**: **Sandy Dennis – Who's Afraid of Virginia Woolf? as Honey**; Wendy Hiller – A Man for All Seasons as Alice More; Jocelyne LaGarde – Hawaii as Queen Malama Kanakoa; Vivien Merchant – Alfie as Lily; Geraldine Page – You're a Big Boy Now as Margery Chanticleer
**Best Writing (Story and Screenplay -- Written Directly for the Screen)**: **A Man and a Woman – Screenplay by Claude Lelouch and Pierre Uytterhoeven; Story by Claude Lelouch**; Blowup – Screenplay by Michelangelo Antonioni, Edward Bond and Tonino Guerra; Story by Michelangelo Antonioni; The Fortune Cookie – Billy Wilder and I. A. L. Diamond; Khartoum – Robert Ardrey; The Naked Prey – Clint Johnston and Don Peters	**Best Writing (Screenplay -- Based on Material from Another Medium)**: **A Man for All Seasons – Robert Bolt based on his play**; Alfie – Bill Naughton based on his play; The Professionals – Richard Brooks based on the novel A Mule for the Marquesa by Frank O'Rourke; The Russians Are Coming, the Russians Are Coming – William Rose based on the novel Off-Islanders by Nathaniel Benchley; Who's Afraid of Virginia Woolf? – Ernest Lehman based on the play by Edward Albee
**Best Foreign Language Film**: **A Man and a Woman (France)**; The Battle of Algiers (Italy); Loves of a Blonde (Czechoslovakia); Pharaoh (Poland); Three (Yugoslavia)	**Best Documentary (Feature)**: **The War Game – Peter Watkins**; The Face of a Genius – Alfred R. Kelman; Helicopter Canada – Peter Jones and Tom Daly; The Really Big Family – Alex Grasshoff; Le Volcan interdit – Haroun Tazieff
**Best Documentary (Short Subject)**: **A Year Toward Tomorrow – Edmond A. Levy**; Adolescence – Marin Karmitz and Vladimir Forgency; Cowboy – Michael Ahnemann and Gary Schlosser; The Odds Against – Lee R. Bobker and Helen Kristt Radin; Részletek J.S. Bach Máté passiójából – Mafilm Studio	**Best Short Subject (Live Action)**: **Wild Wings – Edgar Anstey**; Turkey the Bridge – Derek Williams; The Winning Strain – Leslie Winik
**Best Short Subject (Cartoon)**: **A Herb Alpert and the Tijuana Brass Double Feature – John Hubley and Faith Hubley**; The Drag – Wolf Koenig and Robert Verrall; The Pink Blueprint – David H. DePatie and Friz Freleng	**Best Music (Original Music Score)**: **Born Free – John Barry**; The Bible: In the Beginning... – Toshiro Mayuzumi; Hawaii – Elmer Bernstein; The Sand Pebbles – Jerry Goldsmith; Who's Afraid of Virginia Woolf? – Alex North
**Best Music (Scoring of Music -- Adaptation or Treatment)**: **A Funny Thing Happened on the Way to the Forum – Ken Thorne**; The Gospel According to St. Matthew – Luis Bacalov; Return of the Seven – Elmer Bernstein; The Singing Nun – Harry Sukman; Stop the World – I Want to Get Off – Al Ham	**Best Music (Song)**: **"Born Free" from Born Free – Music by John Barry; Lyrics by Don Black**; "Alfie" from Alfie – Music by Burt Bacharach; Lyrics by Hal David; "Georgy Girl" from Georgy Girl – Music by Tom Springfield; Lyrics by Jim Dale; "My Wishing Doll" from Hawaii – Music by Elmer Bernstein; Lyrics by Mack David; "A Time for Love" from An American Dream – Music by Johnny Mandel; Lyrics by Paul Francis Webster
**Best Sound**: **Grand Prix** – **Franklin Milton**; Gambit – Waldon O. Watson; Hawaii – Gordon E. Sawyer; The Sand Pebbles – James Corcoran; Who's Afraid of Virginia Woolf? – George Groves	**Best Sound Effects**: **Grand Prix – Gordon Daniel**; Fantastic Voyage – Walter Rossi
**Best Art Direction (Black-and-White)**: **Who's Afraid of Virginia Woolf? – Art Direction: Richard Sylbert; Set Decoration: George James Hopkins**; The Fortune Cookie – Art Direction: Robert Luthardt; Set Decoration: Edward G. Boyle; The Gospel According to St. Matthew – Art Direction and Set Decoration: Luigi Scaccianoce; Is Paris Burning? – Art Direction: Willy Holt; Set Decoration: Marc Frédérix and Pierre Guffroy; Mister Buddwing – Art Direction: George Davis and Paul Groesse; Set Decoration: Henry Grace and Hugh Hunt	**Best Art Direction (Color)**: **Fantastic Voyage – Art Direction: Jack Martin Smith and Dale Hennesy; Set Decoration: Walter M. Scott and Stuart A. Reiss**; Gambit – Art Direction: Alexander Golitzen and George C. Webb; Set Decoration: John P. Austin and John McCarthy Jr.; Juliet of the Spirits – Art Direction and Set Decoration: Piero Gherardi; The Oscar – Art Direction: Hal Pereira and Arthur Lonergan; Set Decoration: Robert R. Benton and James W. Payne; The Sand Pebbles – Art Direction: Boris Leven; Set Decoration: Walter M. Scott, John Sturtevant and William Kiernan
**Best Cinematography (Black-and-White)**: **Who's Afraid of Virginia Woolf? – Haskell Wexler**; The Fortune Cookie – Joseph LaShelle; Georgy Girl – Kenneth Higgins; Is Paris Burning? – Marcel Grignon; Seconds – James Wong Howe	**Best Cinematography (Color)**: **A Man for All Seasons – Ted Moore**; Fantastic Voyage – Ernest Laszlo; Hawaii – Russell Harlan; The Professionals – Conrad Hall; The Sand Pebbles – Joseph MacDonald
**Best Costume Design (Black-and-White)**: **Who's Afraid of Virginia Woolf? – Irene Sharaff**; The Gospel According to St. Matthew – Danilo Donati; Mandragola – Danilo Donati; Mister Buddwing – Helen Rose; Morgan! – Jocelyn Rickards	**Best Costume Design (Color)**: **A Man for All Seasons – Joan Bridge and Elizabeth Haffenden**; Gambit – Jean Louis; Hawaii – Dorothy Jeakins; Juliet of the Spirits – Piero Gherardi; The Oscar – Edith Head
**Best Film Editing**: **Grand Prix – Fredric Steinkamp, Henry Berman, Stewart Linder and Frank Santillo**; Fantastic Voyage – William B. Murphy; The Russians Are Coming, the Russians Are Coming – Hal Ashby and J. Terry Williams; The Sand Pebbles – William H. Reynolds; Who's Afraid of Virginia Woolf? – Sam O'Steen	**Best Special Visual Effects**: **Fantastic Voyage – Art Cruickshank**; Hawaii – Linwood G. Dunn

=== Honorary Awards ===
- To Y. Frank Freeman for unusual and outstanding service to the Academy during his thirty years in Hollywood.
- To Yakima Canutt for achievements as a stunt man and for developing safety devices to protect stunt men everywhere.

=== Jean Hersholt Humanitarian Award ===
- George Bagnall

=== Irving G. Thalberg Memorial Award ===
- Robert Wise

=== Multiple nominations and awards ===
These films had multiple nominations:

- 13 nominations: Who's Afraid of Virginia Woolf?
- 8 nominations: A Man for All Seasons and The Sand Pebbles
- 7 nominations: Hawaii
- 5 nominations: Alfie and Fantastic Voyage
- 4 nominations: The Fortune Cookie, Georgy Girl, A Man and a Woman and The Russians Are Coming, the Russians Are Coming
- 3 nominations: Gambit, The Gospel According to St. Matthew, Grand Prix and The Professionals
- 2 nominations: Blowup, Born Free, Is Paris Burning?, Juliet of the Spirits, Mister Buddwing, Morgan! and The Oscar

The following films received multiple awards:

- 6 wins: A Man for All Seasons
- 5 wins: Who's Afraid of Virginia Woolf?
- 3 wins: Grand Prix
- 2 wins: Born Free, Fantastic Voyage and A Man and a Woman

== Presenters and performers ==
The following individuals, listed in order of appearance, presented awards or performed musical numbers.

=== Presenters ===
Name	Role
Hank Simms	Announcer of the 39th Academy Awards
Arthur Freed (AMPAS President)	Gave opening remarks welcoming guests to the awards ceremony
Dean Jones; Raquel Welch	Presenters of the award for Best Sound
Shelley Winters	Presenter of the award for Best Supporting Actor
Ann-Margret; Omar Sharif	Presenters of the awards for Best Cinematography
Irene Dunne	Presenter of the Jean Hersholt Humanitarian Award
Olivia de Havilland	Presenter of the Short Subjects Awards
Diahann Carroll	Presenter of the award for Best Sound Effects
Richard Harris; Barbara Rush	Presenters of the Documentary Awards
Fred MacMurray	Presenter of the award for Best Special Visual Effects
Candice Bergen; Robert Mitchum	Presenters of the awards for Best Costume Design
Sidney Poitier	Presenter of the award for Best Supporting Actress
Jack Valenti	Presenter of the Honorary Award to Y. Frank Freeman
Lee Remick; James Stewart	Presenters of the award for Best Film Editing
Charlton Heston	Presenter of the Honorary Award to Yakima Canutt
Patricia Neal	Presenter of the award for Best Foreign Language Film
Rock Hudson; Vanessa Redgrave	Presenters of the awards for Best Art Direction
Fred Astaire; Ginger Rogers	Presenters of the Writing Awards
Arthur Freed	Presenter of the Irving G. Thalberg Memorial Award to Robert Wise
Mary Tyler Moore; Dick Van Dyke	Presenters of the Music Awards
Dean Martin	Presenter of the award for Best Song
Lee Marvin	Presenter of the award for Best Actress
Rosalind Russell	Presenter of the award for Best Director
Julie Christie	Presenter of the award for Best Actor
Audrey Hepburn	Presenter of the award for Best Picture

=== Performers ===
Name	Role	Performed
Johnny Green	Musical arranger and conductor	Orchestral
Dionne Warwick	Performer	"Alfie" from Alfie
Roger Williams; The Young Americans	Performers	"Born Free" from Born Free
Mitzi Gaynor	Performer	"Georgy Girl" from Georgy Girl
John Davidson	Performer	"A Time for Love" from An American Dream
Jackie DeShannon	Performer	"My Wishing Doll" from Hawaii

== See also ==
- 24th Golden Globe Awards
- 1966 in film
- 9th Grammy Awards
- 18th Primetime Emmy Awards
- 19th Primetime Emmy Awards
- 20th British Academy Film Awards
- 21st Tony Awards
- List of submissions to the 39th Academy Awards for Best Foreign Language Film
