= 19th Writers Guild of America Awards =

19th WGA Awards
- Date: 1967
- Organized by: Writers Guild of America, East and the Writers Guild of America, West

The 19th Writers Guild of America Awards honored the best film writers and television writers of 1966. Winners were announced in 1967.

== Winners and nominees ==
=== Film ===
Winners are listed first highlighted in boldface.

| **Best Written American Drama**: **Who's Afraid of Virginia Woolf?, Screenplay by Ernest Lehman**; Harper, Screenplay by William Goldman; Based on the novel by Ross Macdonald; The Professionals, Screenplay by Richard Brooks; Based on the novel by Frank O'Rourke; The Sand Pebbles, Screenplay by Robert Anderson; Based on the novel by Richard McKenna | **Best Written American Comedy**: **The Russians Are Coming, the Russians Are Coming, Screenplay by William Rose; Based on the novel by Nathaniel Benchley**; How to Steal a Million, Screenplay by Harry Kurnitz; Based on a story by George Bradshaw; Our Man Flint, Screenplay by Hal Fimberg and Ben Starr; Based on a story by Hal Fimberg; The Fortune Cookie, Written by Billy Wilder and I. A. L. Diamond; You're a Big Boy Now, Screenplay by Francis Ford Coppola; Based on the novel by David Benedictus |

=== Television ===
| **Episodic Comedy**: **"You Ought to Be in Pictures" – The Dick Van Dyke Show (CBS) – Jack Winter**; "The Great Kahuna" – Gidget (ABC) – Albert Mannheimer (Teleplay), Frederick Kohner (story); "Opie Joins the Marines" – Gomer Pyle: USMC (CBS) – Aaron Ruben; "Go Tell the Birds and the Bees" – The Dick Van Dyke Show (CBS) – Rick Mittleman | **Episodic Drama**: **"No Justice for the Judge" – The Trials of O'Brien (CBS) – David Ellis**; "Judge Them Gently" – Court Martial (CBS) – Gerry Day; "Color Him Red" – Slattery's People (CBS) – Pat Fielder; "When the Wind Blows" – The Fugitive (ABC) – Betty Landgon; "The Horse Fighter" – The Virginian (NBC) – Richard Fielder |

=== Special awards ===
Laurel Award for Screenwriting Achievement

**Richard Brooks**

Valentine Davies Award

**Edmund H. North**

Edmund J. North Award

**Charles Brackett**

**Richard L. Breen**
