= All the Way Home (1957 film) =

- Directed by: Lee R. Bobker
- Written by: Muriel Rukeyser
- Produced by: Nathan Zucker
- Edited by: Yoshio Kishi
- Production company: Dynamic Films
- Release date: 1957 (United States)
- Running time: 28 minutes
- Country: United States
- Language: English

All the Way Home – When A Black Family Moves Next Door is a 1957 American short black and white documentary film directed by Lee R. Bobker and produced by Nathan Zucker. It was written by Muriel Rukeyser and produced by Dynamic Films, Inc., a New York-based film production, documentary and theatrical film and TV production company founded in 1948.

== Premise ==
The film depicts an elderly white family in the 1950s selling their home. When the family's patriarch shows the home to an interested African American family, neighbors within the all-white community begin to gossip. The elderly white family became the target of harassment and threats by bigoted neighbors, who do not want African American families to move into the neighborhood.

This film is notable among a genre of documentary films aimed at curbing white American anxiety and supremacist violence against racial desegregation and racial integration in the 1950s and 1960s. It serves as an earlier anti-discrimination narrative and racial sounding post in the spirit of the documentary Building the American Dream: Levittown, NY, which discussed Levittown, New York, the prototypical Post-World War II tract home suburb built in the late 1940s that excluded African Americans via restricted covenants and supremacist activism.

== Plot ==
The film begins with a male narrator's depiction of a quiet, attractive, well-manicured suburban American neighborhood in the 1950s.

Ed, an elderly white gentleman, nails a "For Sale" sign post in the front yard of his single family home. Suddenly, a well-dressed African American man in a high quality late-model automobile drives up into Ed's driveway. After greeting Ed, the African American man is joined by his wife and daughter. They all enter Ed's home for a grand tour.

Nearby, two white female neighbors begin to gossip franticly, lamenting that Ed may sell the property to an African American family. One of the female neighbors rushes home to call her husband Dick. Soon after, neighbors begin incessant telephone calls to each other's households, fearful of African American incursion in their community.

After the American-American family departs Ed's home, Ed and his wife reminisce on life in their beloved home and neighborhood. When the telephone rings, Ed's wife answers it, put off by what appears to be racially hostile complaint from one of her neighbors.

The next day, Ed stand at a local bus stop with Tom, a neighbor and fellow lodge member. Before the bus arrives, Tom expresses racial animosity towards Ed for inviting an African American family to view Ed's home. Upset, Ed rushes over to the office of Ted, a local real estate broker. Ted, who appears to have a racial bias against African Americans, asks Ed to take down his "For Sale" sign and allow Ted to sell the house to the "right buyer".

Later that day, Ed shares his frustration with his wife, his daughter and son-in-law, Bob. Suddenly, a car aggressively pulls up in Ed's front yard and throws a can of black paint onto the "For Sale" sign. Some of the paint lands onto the dress of Ed's young granddaughter, Laurie. Ed's young grandson, Bobby, attempts to chase the car as it flees down the street.

The next day, Ed stands in a local school yard watching children play. He overhears two neighbors expressing racial animosity against African-American homeownership in their predominately white neighborhood.

Disgruntled, Ted visits a prominent local banker, Ralph. Ted complains to Ralph that Ed will set off a negative chain reaction of African-American homeownership that will lower housing values. Ralph, who considers himself a "practical man", cites studies demonstrating that land values tend to go up when African-American families integrate communities. Undeterred by Ralph's pronouncements, Ted demands that Ralph convince his bank modify its real estate loan policy to curb loans to African-Americans, all to reassure "homeowners of this community, and the merchants and the service companies."

Ed's wife visits her local church minister to discuss recent occurrences in light of her biased upbringing and impulse to do the right thing by the African-American family and their young daughter. Her minister shares his church's position against ignorance and hate.

Undeterred, Ted reconvenes a follow-up meeting at Ralph's bank. Ralph reads Ted his bank's policy: "This bank is in the business of making sound loans properly secured." Ted balks at Ralph's policy pronouncement, warning Ralph that their white neighbors will flee the community, turning it into a slum. Ralph rebuts Ted, reminding him that a man's ability to pay his debts should never have anything to do with the color of his skin or where he came from. Disgruntled, Ted alludes to Ralph that he will not allow bank policy to keep him from selling real estate to white people or helping his neighbors sell their homes and relocate.

In a final scene, various members of the community meet to debate how to protect land values and thwart undesirables from moving into their community. One of them mention that Ted is already meeting with various white residents to help them sell their homes. Ralph retorts, advising the attendees that homeownership should be focused on a person's worth and ability to afford that property, "not the color of the skin, their religion, or where his parents come from."

== Cast and crew ==
- Lee R. Bobker – Director
- Muriel Rukeyser – Writer
- Nathan Zucker – Producer
- Ray E. Long – Director of Photography
- Yoshio Kishi – Film Editor
- Jack Fitzstephens (credited as John J. Fitzstephens) – Production Manager
- James Townsend – Sound Recordist
- William Schwartz – Sound Recordist

== Acknowledgements ==
The end titles state: "The producer gratefully acknowledges the assistance given by the following committee under whose guidance this film was made:"

- Charles Abrams – New York State Commission Against Discrimination
- Algernon D. Black – National Committee Against Discrimination in Housing
- Oscar Cohen – Anti-Defamation League of B'Nai Brith
- Lillian Hatcher – Fair Practices and Anti-Discrimination Department, United Auto Workers
- Frank Smith Horne (credited as Frank S. Horne) – New York Commission on Intergroup Relations
- Reginald Johnson – National Urban League, Inc.
- Madison S. Jones – National Association for the Advancement of Colored People
- Alfred S. Kramer – National Council of Churches of Christ in the U.S.A. (as Rev. Alfred S. Kramer)
- Harold A. Lett – Division Against Discrimination, State of New Jersey
- Edward Rutledge – New York State Commission Against Discrimination
- James H. Scheuer – Housing Advisory Council, New York State Commission Against Discrimination
- George Sehermer – Philadelphia Commission on Human Relations
- Galen Weaver – Congregational Christian Churches (as Rev. Galen Weaver)
