= A Man Called Gannon =

1968 film

- Theatrical release poster
- Directed by: James Goldstone
- Screenplay by: Gene R. Kearney; Borden Chase; D.D. Beauchamp
- Based on: Man Without a Star by Dee Linford
- Produced by: Howard Christie
- Starring: Tony Franciosa; Michael Sarrazin; Judi West; Susan Oliver; John Anderson
- Cinematography: William Margulies
- Edited by: Gene Palmer; Richard M. Sprague
- Music by: Dave Grusin
- Color process: Technicolor
- Production company: Universal Pictures
- Distributed by: Universal Pictures
- Release date: March 8, 1968
- Running time: 105 minutes
- Country: United States
- Language: English

A Man Called Gannon is a 1968 American Western film directed by James Goldstone starring Tony Franciosa, Michael Sarrazin, Judi West, Susan Oliver, and John Anderson. The film is a remake of Man Without a Star (1955) which was based on the novel Man Without a Star by Dee Linford.

Supporting actors in the film are David Sheiner, James Westerfield, Gavin MacLeod, Eddie Firestone, and Ed Peck.

== Plot ==
Cowboy Gannon (Tony Franciosa) rescues Jess Washburn (Michael Sarrazin) from being run over by a train. Together, they got jobs at the ranch working for Beth (Judi West), who has inherited her late husband's spread. Beth is determined to bring in a massive herd of cattle in one season, sell them and move to the city, but neighboring ranchers are worried her plans will destroy their grazing pasture. Beth seduces Jess into fighting the others, and Gannon helps the neighboring ranchers put up barbed wire.

== Cast ==
- Tony Franciosa as Gannon
- Michael Sarrazin as Jess Washburn
- Judi West as Beth
- Susan Oliver as Matty
- John Anderson as Capper
- David Sheiner as Sheriff Polaski
- James Westerfield as Amos
- Gavin MacLeod as Lou
- Eddie Firestone as Maz
- Ed Peck as Delivery Rider
- Harry Davis as Harry
- Robert Sorrells as Goff
- Terry Wilson as Coss
- Eddra Gale as Louisa
- Harry Basch as Ben
- James Callahan as Bo
- Cliff Potter as Ike
- Jason Evers as Mills

== Production ==
The railroad scenes were filmed on the Sierra Railroad in Tuolumne County, California.

== Release ==
=== Critical response ===
Brian Hannan wrote in The Gunslingers of '69: Western Movies' Greatest Year that Journey to Shilouh was a bigger flop than A Man Called Gannon.

== See also ==
- Man Without a Star (1955)
- List of American films of 1968
