= Gambit (1966 film) =

1966 film by Ronald Neame

- Theatrical release poster
- Directed by: Ronald Neame
- Screenplay by: Jack Davies; Alvin Sargent
- Story by: Sidney Carroll
- Produced by: Leo L. Fuchs
- Starring: Shirley MacLaine; Michael Caine; Herbert Lom; Roger C. Carmel; Arnold Moss
- Cinematography: Clifford Stine
- Edited by: Alma Macrorie
- Music by: Maurice Jarre
- Production company: Universal Pictures
- Distributed by: Universal Pictures
- Release dates: December 21, 1966 (limited); January 7, 1967 (United States)
- Running time: 109 minutes
- Country: United States
- Language: English
- Box office: $2.5 million (US and Canada rentals)

Gambit is a 1966 American heist comedy film directed by Ronald Neame from a screenplay by Jack Davies and Alvin Sargent from the original story of Sidney Carroll. It stars Shirley MacLaine and Michael Caine, with Herbert Lom, Roger C. Carmel, and Arnold Moss. The film follows a thief (Caine) who enlists a chorus girl (MacLaine) in an elaborate plot to steal a priceless antique bust owned by multi-millionaire Mr. Shahbandar (Lom). It was nominated for three Academy Awards. A remake was released in 2012, with a script by Joel and Ethan Coen.

== Plot ==
Aspiring Cockney cat burglar Harry Tristan Dean and his sculptor friend Emile Fournier discover exotic Eurasian showgirl Nicole Chang in a crowded Hong Kong nightclub. Nicole bears an uncanny resemblance both to the late wife of the world's richest man, an Arab named Ahmad Shahbandar, as well as to a priceless bust statue of an ancient Chinese Empress, Li Su, owned by the tycoon in tribute to his dead bride. Harry and Emile need Nicole for a scheme to steal the Li Su, replacing it with a copy created by Emile. Harry's explanation to Emile of the caper is supposedly "flawless"—played out onscreen with Nicole meekly obeying instructions without saying a single word. The plot hinges on Shahbandar's being enticed by Nicole to invite them to his private penthouse where his art collection is stored.

In reality, Harry's plot fails his imagined scenario in almost every detail. Nicole—who expresses her skepticism freely—questions the suspicious offer of $5,000 for an unspecified "job", but is convinced by the offer of an "authentic" British passport.

Arriving in the Middle Eastern city of Dammuz, Harry and Nicole, assuming the identities of Sir Harold Dean and Lady Nicole Dean, check into Shahbandar's hotel, where Shahbandar lives in the penthouse. Now learning of her resemblance to Shahbandar's dead bride, Nicole is skeptical that the tycoon will be fooled by such obvious bait. Shahbandar immediately discovers Harry's deceitfulness, ostensibly only playing along with Harry and Nicole to see what they are plotting, but he cannot resist the bait.

Inviting them to lunch, Shahbandar grants Nicole's wish to see his fabulous private quarters, giving Harry the opportunity to case the premises and learn that the statue is guarded by a sophisticated electronic device. Nicole is aghast when she learns what Harry wants to steal but goes along because she is falling in love with him.

Shahbandar invites them to dinner; Harry refuses but persuades Nicole to accept so she will occupy Shahbandar while he steals the statue. At a nightclub, Nicole realizes Shahbandar suspects them and slips away to warn Harry under a pretense that keeps Shahbandar waiting. Working together, they remove the statue without triggering the alarm, but afterwards Nicole accidentally triggers the alarm by exuberantly crossing the electronic beam when Harry declares he loves her.

At Harry's insistence, Nicole immediately flees to the airport to return to Hong Kong, while he will flee separately along a preplanned route. Still in Shahbandar's quarters, Harry conceals himself and watches as the guards note the missing statue and check a secret compartment in the wall, where the real Li Su is hidden: the one in Harry's hands is a decoy copy.

When Shahbandar rechecks the secret compartment, he finds the marked fake in place of the original and has Nicole arrested at the airport. The next morning Shahbandar tells her that his agents have found Harry in Hong Kong, presenting her with a dossier that reveals Harry has no prior criminal convictions. Admitting that his soft spot for Nicole enticed him to play along, underestimate Harry's plot, and lose the game he enabled, Shahbandar is inclined to give them a break. Nicole is free to go if she takes the message to Harry that he will be arrested unless the Li Su is returned.

At Emile's workshop in Hong Kong, Harry reveals that he hid the authentic statue in a hollow compartment inside a Buddha statue Emile had previously sent to Shahbandar. The plot always was to give the appearance the Li Su had been stolen so the theft would be reported. When making the duplicate for Shahbandar, Emile had made another exact replica of the statue. With three prospective buyers already waiting, Harry and Emile will sell the replica as the real thing. Harry sends Shahbandar a telegram revealing the whereabouts of the authentic statue, declaring their game "a draw".

When Nicole decries his dishonesty, Harry smashes the replica to prove she is more important than his criminal aspirations. Nicole and Harry leave Emile supposedly disconsolate. Immediately afterwards, Emile receives a telephone call from a buyer and takes from his closet one of three additional secret replicas of Li Su.

== Cast ==
- Shirley MacLaine as Nicole
- Michael Caine as Harry
- Herbert Lom as Shahbandar
- Roger C. Carmel as Ram
- Arnold Moss as Abdul
- John Abbott as Emile
- Richard Angarola as Colonel Salim
- Maurice Marsac as hotel clerk

== Accolades ==
Award	Year	Category	Recipient(s)	Result	Ref.
Academy Awards	1967	Best Art Direction (Color)	Art Direction: Alexander Golitzen and George C. Webb; Set Decoration: John McCarthy Jr. and John P. Austin	Nominated	
Academy Awards	1967	Best Costume Design (Color)	Jean Louis	Nominated	
Academy Awards	1967	Best Sound	Waldon O. Watson	Nominated	
Golden Globe Awards	1967	Best Motion Picture – Musical or Comedy	Gambit	Nominated	
Golden Globe Awards	1967	Best Actor in a Motion Picture – Musical or Comedy	Michael Caine	Nominated	
Golden Globe Awards	1967	Best Actress in a Motion Picture – Musical or Comedy	Shirley MacLaine	Nominated	
Laurel Awards	1967	Female Comedy Performance	Shirley MacLaine	Nominated	

== Reception ==
On the review aggregator website Rotten Tomatoes, 100% of 7 critics' reviews are positive. Contemporary critical response to Gambit was moderately positive. Variety called it a "firstrate suspense comedy, cleverly scripted, expertly directed". Andrew Sarris was more critical; writing for The Village Voice, he noted that Caine was "performing the divine function of a star in redeeming bad movies from deserved oblivion".

== Remake ==
A remake of Gambit was released in 2012, starring Colin Firth and Cameron Diaz in the leads, with Diaz's character now a Texas rodeo performer who is coaxed by Firth into coming to England and attempting to con a billionaire played by Alan Rickman. The script for this adaptation was written by Joel and Ethan Coen.

== See also ==
- List of American films of 1966
- Nonlinear narrative
