= Psychiatric Nursing =

1958 film

- Directed by: Lee R. Bobker
- Written by: Ann Schoolman, Ralph Schoolman
- Produced by: Nathan Zucker
- Production company: Dynamic Films
- Distributed by: Smith, Kline & French
- Release date: 1958
- Running time: 34 minutes
- Country: United States
- Language: English

Psychiatric Nursing: The Nurse-Patient Relationship is a 1958 American documentary film directed by Lee R. Bobker. The documentary tells about psychiatric nursing practices in a women’s ward of a mental health hospital, focusing on interactions between nurses and patients. It was nominated for an Academy Award for Best Documentary Feature.

== Cast ==
- Susan Davis – self (patient)
- Trudy Calvin – self (nurse)

== See also ==
- The Odds Against
- The Revolving Door

== See also ==
- List of American films of 1958
