= The Secret Place (short story) =

- Short story by Richard McKenna
- Country: United States
- Language: English
- Genre: Science fiction short story

Publication
- Published in: Orbit 1
- Publication type: Anthology
- Publisher: Berkley Medallion
- Media type: Print
- Publication date: October 1966
- Pages: 17
- Award: Nebula Award for Best Short Story (1967)

"The Secret Place" is a short story by the American writer Richard McKenna. It was among papers found after his death in 1964, and it was first published in 1966, in the anthology Orbit 1.

== Story summary ==
The narrator, Duard Campbell, recalls an important period in his life 16 years ago, knowing that his son will ask him what he did in the war. He was one of several geology graduates assigned by the army to search an area of desert in Oregon where it was believed uranium oxide was found. The scientists assume the search is futile. When fieldwork is complete, Campbell alone is told to remain, to give the impression that the project is continuing. He thinks this will blight his academic career.

He thinks there might be something in the local story, and he hires Helen, the sister of the boy found dead with a crystal of uranium oxide, as his secretary. She is "made of frightened ice". She and her brother Owen used to play fairy tales in the desert; she says the search area is "full of just wonderful places". In the desert, she becomes a child again and shows Campbell the places that are important in the fairy stories. He takes part in the make-believe, but Helen eventually says "You're not Owen, you're just a man!" A resident of the township, hearing that Helen is upset, warns him that local men would kill him if he was not careful.

When he receives in the mail the maps showing the results of the fieldwork, and sees the details, he realizes the significance of the fairy stories.

== Reception ==
"The Secret Place" was a finalist for the Hugo Award for Best Short Story in 1967. It won the Nebula Award for Best Short Story in 1967, and was included in Nebula Award Stories Two; in the introduction to the story, the editors wrote: "It is a sensitive piece of writing, a perfect example of second generation science fiction, the retelling and reexamination of a theme that originated in the pulp years of this medium."
