= The Great Bank Robbery =

1969 film by Hy Averback

- Theatrical release poster
- Directed by: Hy Averback
- Screenplay by: William Peter Blatty
- Based on: The Great Bank Robbery by Frank O'Rourke
- Produced by: Malcolm Stuart
- Starring: Zero Mostel; Kim Novak; Clint Walker; Claude Akins
- Cinematography: Fred J. Koenekamp
- Edited by: Gene Milford
- Music by: Nelson Riddle
- Production company: Warner Bros.-Seven Arts
- Distributed by: Warner Bros.-Seven Arts
- Release date: 10 September 1969
- Running time: 98 minutes
- Country: United States
- Language: English
- Box office: $1.5 million (US/ Canada rentals)

The Great Bank Robbery is a 1969 Western comedy film from Warner Bros.-Seven Arts directed by Hy Averback and written by William Peter Blatty, based on the novel by Frank O'Rourke. The movie had a soundtrack with songs by Jimmy Van Heusen.

== Plot ==
Gold stolen by outlaws is stashed in the impenetrable bank of Friendly, a small town in Texas. A preacher, Rev. Pious Blue, is actually a thief. He and his associates, including voluptuous partner Lyda Kebanov, plan to tunnel into the vault and blow it up with TNT, just as a Fourth of July celebration drowns out the noise.

There are complications. A number of rival gangs (which include Mexican bandits and a gunfighter called Slade) are also after the loot. Then there is Ben Quick of the Texas Rangers, a lawman out to find evidence confirming the corruption of the banker and town Mayor Kincaid, who is also inside the vault.

The reverend's band is successful, distracting the bank's guards by having Lyda pretend to be Lady Godiva, riding nude on a white horse, with just small flower pasties covering her nipples and groin. They intend to escape by hot-air balloon. The gold is too heavy for liftoff, however. Lyda volunteers to abandon ship, in part because she has fallen for Quick, who finds the proof he needs to convict Kincaid while the Reverend floats safely away, along with the gold.

== Cast ==
- Zero Mostel as Rev. Pious Blue
- Kim Novak as Sister Lyda Kebanov
- Clint Walker as Ranger Ben Quick
- Claude Akins as Slade
- Sam Jaffe as Brother Lilac Bailey
- Mako as Secret Agent Fong
- Akim Tamiroff as Papa (Juan's father)
- Larry Storch as Juan
- John Anderson as Mayor Kincaid
- Elisha Cook as Jeb
- Ruth Warrick as Mrs. Applebee
- John Larch as Sheriff of Friendly
- Peter Whitney as Brother Jordan Cass (tunneling)
- Norman Alden as The Great Gregory (balloonist)
- Grady Sutton as Rev. Simms
- John Fiedler as Brother Dismas Ostracorn (Explosives)

== Production notes ==
Zero Mostel uses the line "What we have here is a failure to communicate" which is similar to (and possibly a parody of or simply just a misquote of) a line from 1967's Cool Hand Luke. This line by Rev. Pious Blue is actually more often quoted than the original line and usually categorized as merely a misquote.

The railroad scenes were filmed on the Sierra Railroad in Tuolumne County, California.

== Reception ==
Vincent Canby of The New York Times had nothing but disdain for the picture: "The Great Bank Robbery, the Western farce that opened yesterday at neighborhood theaters, is probably the least interesting movie of 1969 through this date. I hedge because there are several films I haven't seen, and because The Great Bank Robbery is so casually inept it can't support even negative superlatives."

Film historian Leonard Maltin seemed to agree: "...A total dud, hardly worthy of the writer who gave us A Shot in the Dark and The Exorcist. Be warned."

== See also ==
- List of American films of 1969
