= The Revolving Door =

1968 film

- Directed by: Lee R. Bobker
- Produced by: Lee R. Bobker
- Production company: Vision Associates
- Distributed by: American Foundation Institute of Corrections
- Release date: 1968
- Running time: 28.5 minutes
- Country: United States
- Language: English

The Revolving Door is a 1968 American short documentary film directed by Lee R. Bobker and produced by Vision Associates. The 28.5 minute film was nominated for an Academy Award for Best Documentary Short.

== See also ==
- Psychiatric Nursing
- The Odds Against
