= The Sand Pebbles (film) =

1966 film by Robert Wise

- Theatrical release poster by Howard Terpning
- Directed by: Robert Wise
- Screenplay by: Robert Anderson
- Based on: The Sand Pebbles by Richard McKenna
- Produced by: Robert Wise
- Starring: Steve McQueen; Richard Attenborough; Richard Crenna; Candice Bergen; Marayat Andriane
- Cinematography: Joseph MacDonald
- Edited by: William Reynolds
- Music by: Jerry Goldsmith
- Production companies: Argyle Enterprises; Solar Productions
- Distributed by: 20th Century-Fox
- Release date: December 20, 1966
- Running time: 182 minutes (Original release); 196 minutes (Roadshow)
- Country: United States
- Languages: English; Mandarin
- Budget: $12.1 million
- Box office: $30 million

The Sand Pebbles is a 1966 American epic war film directed by Robert Wise in Panavision, based on the novel of the same name by Richard McKenna. It tells the story of an independent, rebellious U.S. Navy machinist's mate first class, aboard the fictional river gunboat USS San Pablo, on Yangtze Patrol in 1920s China. The production was filmed on location in Taiwan and Hong Kong.

The film stars Steve McQueen, Richard Attenborough, Richard Crenna, and Candice Bergen, and features Marayat Andriane, Mako, and Larry Gates in supporting roles. Robert Anderson adapted the screenplay from the 1962 novel of the same name by Richard McKenna.

The Sand Pebbles was a critical and commercial success during its general release. It became the fourth-highest-grossing film of 1966, and was nominated for eight Academy Awards, including Best Picture and Best Actor for Steve McQueen, his only Oscar nomination, and eight Golden Globe Awards, with Attenborough winning the Golden Globe for Best Supporting Actor.

== Plot ==
In 1926 China during its Warlord Era, Navy Machinist's Mate First Class Jake Holman transfers to the Yangtze River Patrol gunboat USS San Pablo as their new engineer. Almost immediately, he upsets the crew when he will not accept the coolies they use to do most of their duties. Instead, Holman takes personal responsibility of the engine room. He befriends a seasoned sailor named Frenchy.

After an engine malfunction, caused by a problem Holman noticed but the captain refused to repair, the chief Chinese engine-room worker dies. Lop-eye Shing, leader of all the Chinese workers on board, blames Holman. The captain tells Holman he must find a Chinese replacement, so he chooses the simple but genial Po-han.

The sailors on shore leave visit a bar and brothel run by a former sailor. A high-priced virgin named Maily captivates the crew. Frenchy discovers that her price is the debt she must pay to get her freedom.

Holman's nemesis Stawski conspires with Shing to get Po-han kicked off the boat. In response, Holman proposes a boxing match: if Stawski wins, he gets the money needed for Maily but, if he loses, Po-han keeps his job. Stawski is almost beaten when the alarm sounds, forcing the crew to rush back to their boat, but Holman forces the ten count to finish. A Chinese mob has been angered that British warships have fought a battle with Chinese warlords on the Yangtze River, the Wanhsien incident.

When the Chinese Civil War begins, the San Pablo is ordered to remain neutral, while rescuing stranded Americans up river. Po-han is sent ashore by Shing while the sailors collect Jameson, a missionary, and Shirley Eckert, his schoolteacher assistant. After being caught by a mob, Holman violates the captain's orders to stay neutral by shooting Po-han to end his brutal death on shore.

Back in port, Chinese locals openly show their hatred towards the sailors. Jameson and Eckert head off to a new mission. Frenchy tries to buy Maily's freedom, but instead she is put up for auction. Holman tries to help Frenchy pay the higher price, but a fight breaks out. The three of them escape. Frenchy and Maily have an unofficial marriage in an empty church. Holman and Eckert start to fall in love, but he thinks it cannot last, as he will likely be leaving China soon.

As winter comes, the boat becomes stuck as the river level drops. Shore leave is cancelled when the Chinese workers abandon the crew after Shing plants Opium aboard and Stawski destroys it in the furnace under Collins orders and a flotilla of local civilians blockade the ship. To see Maily, Frenchy regularly swims the freezing waters, but eventually he catches pneumonia and dies. Anti-foreign Chinese forces kill Maily and frame Holman for her murder. They surround the ship and demand his surrender. With tensions rising and the crew also demanding Holman leave, the captain fires a Lewis gun, ending the matter.

Captain Collins decides to rescue Jameson and Eckert from their new mission after hearing of antiforeigner riots in Nanking. However, the San Pablo encounters a line of tethered junks blocking their way, sparking an armed conflict. Under fire, Holman chops through the rope. He kills a Chinese militiaman only to recognize the young man as one of Jameson's and Shirley's students.

The gunboat arrives at the mission, but Jameson and Shirley Eckert refuse to leave. While they argue, Nationalist soldiers attack, killing Jameson. The patrol retreats but, when Collins is killed, Holman takes command. Shirley and he affirm their love, and Holman promises to follow while covering their escape. He kills several soldiers but is fatally shot as he is about to rejoin the others. A dying Holman bewilderedly asks, "I was home... What happened? What the hell happened?"

Shirley and the remaining sailors reach the boat. The San Pablo slowly steams away.

== Cast ==
- Steve McQueen as Holman
- Richard Attenborough as Frenchy
- Richard Crenna as Captain Collins
- Candice Bergen as Shirley
- Marayat Andriane as Maily
- Mako as Po-han
- Larry Gates as Jameson
- Charles Robinson as Ensign Bordelles
- Simon Oakland as Stawski
- Ford Rainey as Harris
- Joe Turkel as Bronson
- Gavin MacLeod as Crosley
- Joseph di Reda as Shanahan
- Richard Loo as Major Chin
- Barney Phillips as Franks
- Gus Trikonis as Restorff
- Shepherd Sanders as Perna
- James Jeter as Farren
- Tom Middleton as Jennings
- Paul Chinpae as Cho-jen
- Tommy Lee as Chien
- Beulah Quo as Mama Chunk
- James Hong as Victor Shu
- Stephen Jahn as Haythorn
- Jay Allan Hopkins as Wilsey
- Steve Ferry as Lamb
- Ted Fish as Wellbeck
- Loren Janes as Coleman
- Glenn Wilder as Waldron

Former child actor and career naval officer Frank Coghlan Jr., was the film's U.S. Navy technical advisor; he made an uncredited appearance as an American businessman.

== Production ==
=== Development ===
For years, Robert Wise had wanted to make The Sand Pebbles, but the film companies were reluctant to finance it. The Sand Pebbles was eventually financed by Twentieth Century-Fox, but because its production required extensive location scouting and preproduction work, as well as being affected by a monsoon in Taipei, its producer and director Wise realized that principal photography could not begin for more than a year. At the insistence of Fox, Wise agreed to direct a "fill-in" project, the Academy Award-winning The Sound of Music.

=== Pre-production ===
Fox spent $250,000 building a replica gunboat named the San Pablo, based on the USS Villalobos — a former Spanish Navy gunboat that was seized by the U.S. Navy in the Philippine Islands during the Spanish–American War (1898–1899) — but with a greatly reduced draft to allow sailing on the shallow Tam Sui and Keelung Rivers. The replica's final design was closer to that of 1928 river gunboats than that of the Villalobos. A seaworthy vessel that was actually powered by Cummins diesel engines, the San Pablo made the voyage from Hong Kong to Taiwan and back under her own power during shooting of The Sand Pebbles. After filming was completed, the San Pablo was sold to the DeLong Timber Company and renamed the Nola D, then later sold to Seiscom Delta Exploration Co., which used it as a floating base camp with significant modifications, including removal of its engines and the addition of a helipad. The boat was towed to Singapore and broken up in 1975.

Robert Wise's cinematographer from The Sound of Music, Ted McCord, had taken a scouting trip to the Asian locations, but he informed Wise that his heart problems made him not capable enough to shoot the film.

=== Filming ===
The Sand Pebbles was filmed in Taiwan and Hong Kong. Its filming, which began on November 22, 1965, in Keelung, was scheduled to take about nine weeks, but it ended up taking seven months. The cast and crew took a break for the Christmas holidays in Tamsui, Taipei.

At one point, a 15-foot camera boat capsized on the Keelung River, setting back the schedule because the soundboard was ruined when it sank. When the filming was finally completed in Taiwan, the government of the Republic of China was rumored to have held the passports of several cast members because of unpaid additional taxes. In March 1966, the filming moved to Hong Kong and Shaw Brothers Studio for three months, mainly for scenes in Sai Kung and Tung Chung. In June, production traveled to Hollywood to finish its interior scenes at Fox Studios.

Due to frequent rain and other difficulties in Hong Kong, the filming was halted and nearly abandoned. McQueen had developed an abscessed molar and returned to California because he did not wish to be treated in Hong Kong. By the time he received treatment in Los Angeles, he was very ill and was ordered by his dentist and physician to take an extended period of rest, one that further delayed production for several more weeks.

Some filming took place on the dreadnought-type battleship USS Texas, but these scenes were cut from the final film. After more than 40 years, 20th Century Fox found 14 minutes of footage that had been cut from the film's initial roadshow version shown at New York's Rivoli Theatre. The restored version has been released on DVD. The sequences are spread throughout the film and add texture to the story, though they do not alter it in any significant way.

== Themes and background ==
The military life of the San Pablo's crew, the titular "Sand Pebbles", portrays the era's culture and colonialism on a small scale through the sailors' relations with the coolies, who run their gunboat, and the bargirls, who serve them off-duty, as well as, on a large scale, with the West's gunboat diplomacy domination of China.

Although the 1962 novel antedated extensive U.S. activity in Vietnam, and was not based on any historic incidents, by the December 1966 release of the film, it was seen as an explicit statement on the U.S.'s extensive combat involvement in the Vietnam War in reviews published by The New York Times and Life.

== Release ==
It rained the night of the premiere, December 20, 1966, at the Rivoli Theatre, 750 Seventh Avenue, New York City. Afterward, McQueen did not do any film work for about a year due to exhaustion, saying that whatever sins he had committed in his life had been paid for when he made The Sand Pebbles. He was not seen on film again until two 1968 films, The Thomas Crown Affair and Bullitt.

According to records at Fox, the film needed to earn $21,200,000 in rentals to break even, and by December 1970, made $20,600,000. In September 1970, the studio recorded a loss of $895,000 on the movie.

== Reception ==
The film was acclaimed by a wide array of critics. The film has an 86% rating on Rotten Tomatoes based on 21 reviews.

Bosley Crowther of The New York Times called it "a beautifully mounted film" with "a curiously turgid and uneven attempt to generate a war romance". Crowther wrote, "It is not as historical romance that it is likely to grab the audience, but as a weird sort of hint of what has happened and is happening in Vietnam."

Arthur D. Murphy of Variety declared it "a handsome production, boasting some excellent characterizations. Steve McQueen delivers an outstanding performance."

Philip K. Scheuer of the Los Angeles Times called it "adventure on the grand scale, of a kind on which the British have too long enjoyed an exclusive monopoly. The Sand Pebbles earns a place up there beside The Bridge on the River Kwai, Lawrence of Arabia, Doctor Zhivago, et al ... Too, the parallel with 1966 and Vietnam could hardly be more timely."

Richard L. Coe of The Washington Post called the film "a strong story with highly unusual backgrounds, a character perfectly suited to Steve McQueen, and an engrossing drive that falters only because three hours is a bit much."

The Monthly Film Bulletin wrote: "History, of course, never really repeats itself in the way script-writers would like it to, and the parallel between China in 1926 and Vietnam today is distinctly dubious. But this striking of attitudes is the film's undoing, since it seriously undermines the narrative by presenting the characters as little more than pawns in a didactic chess game. And in any case, the script never decides which side of the political fence it wants to sit on."

Brendan Gill of The New Yorker wrote that McQueen "works hard and well" in his role, but described Robert Wise's direction as "molasses-in-January".

== Awards and nominations ==
The performance earned Steve McQueen the only Academy Award nomination of his career.

Award	Category	Nominee(s)	Result
Academy Awards	Best Picture	Robert Wise	Nominated
Academy Awards	Best Actor	Steve McQueen	Nominated
Academy Awards	Best Supporting Actor	Mako	Nominated
Academy Awards	Best Art Direction – Color	Art Direction: Boris Leven; Set Decoration: Walter M. Scott, John Sturtevant and William Kiernan	Nominated
Academy Awards	Best Cinematography – Color	Joseph MacDonald	Nominated
Academy Awards	Best Film Editing	William Reynolds	Nominated
Academy Awards	Best Original Music Score	Jerry Goldsmith	Nominated
Academy Awards	Best Sound	James Corcoran	Nominated
American Cinema Editors Awards	Best Edited Feature Film	William Reynolds	Nominated
Directors Guild of America Awards	Outstanding Directorial Achievement in Motion Pictures	Robert Wise	Nominated
Golden Globe Awards	Best Motion Picture – Drama		Nominated
Golden Globe Awards	Best Actor in a Motion Picture – Drama	Steve McQueen	Nominated
Golden Globe Awards	Best Supporting Actor – Motion Picture	Richard Attenborough	Won
Golden Globe Awards	Best Supporting Actor – Motion Picture	Mako	Nominated
Golden Globe Awards	Best Director – Motion Picture	Robert Wise	Nominated
Golden Globe Awards	Best Screenplay – Motion Picture	Robert Anderson	Nominated
Golden Globe Awards	Best Music, Original Score – Motion Picture	Jerry Goldsmith	Nominated
Golden Globe Awards	Most Promising Newcomer – Female	Candice Bergen	Nominated
Laurel Awards	Top Drama		Nominated
Laurel Awards	Top Male Dramatic Performance	Steve McQueen	Nominated
Laurel Awards	Top Male Supporting Performance	Richard Crenna	Nominated
Motion Picture Sound Editors Awards	Best Sound Editing – Dialogue	James Corcoran	Won
Writers Guild of America Awards	Best Written American Drama	Robert Anderson	Nominated

The film is recognized by the American Film Institute in:

- 2005: AFI's 100 Years of Film Scores – nominated

== See also ==
- List of American films of 1966
- On the Town (1949), film
- The Cruel Sea (1953), film
- The Caine Mutiny (1954), film
- Mister Roberts (1955), film
- Blood Alley (1955), film
- Yangtse Incident (1957), film
- The World of Suzie Wong (1960), film
- Brown-water navy
- Gunboat diplomacy
