= Ron Rich =

American actor (born 1938)

Ron Rich (born 1938 in Pittsburgh, Pennsylvania) is an American actor who played the roles of football player Luther "Boom Boom" Jackson in the Billy Wilder comedy The Fortune Cookie (1966), Juno in the film Chubasco (1968) and Richie Lemoine in the TV series Mission Impossible, as well as being a writer and producer on Ghost Fever (1986).

== Selected television work ==
- The Alfred Hitchcock Hour (1964) (Season 2 Episode 13: "The Magic Shop") as Onlooker (uncredited)
- Gomer Pyle U.S.M.C. (1965) (Season 1 Episode 15: "Grandpa Pyle's Good Luck Charm") as Oliver
- Gomer Pyle U.S.M.C. (1965) (Season 1 Episode 30: "Gomer the M.P.") as Marine
- The Man from U.N.C.L.E. (1965) (Season 1 Episode 25: "The Never-Never Affair") as Pedestrian (uncredited)
- The Man from U.N.C.L.E. (1965) (Season 1 Episode 26: "The Love Affair") as Audience Member (uncredited)
- The Man from U.N.C.L.E. (1965) (Season 1 Episode 29: "The Odd Man Affair") as Speech Spectator (uncredited)
- I Spy (1965) (Season 1 Episode 1: "So Long Patrick Henry") as Reporter (uncredited)
- I Spy (1967) (Season 3 Episode 10: "Apollo") as Roger
- Mission Impossible (1968) (Season 3 Episode 2: "The Contender: Part 1") as Richy Lemoine
- Mission Impossible (1968) (Season 3 Episode 3: "The Contender: Part 2") as Richy Lemoine
- Julia (1968) (Season 1 Episode 8: "The Champ is No Chump") as Bob Nybolt
- The Wild Wild West (1968) (Season 4 Episode 1: "The Night of the Big Blackmail") as Dick January
