= Judi West =

American actress (born 1942)

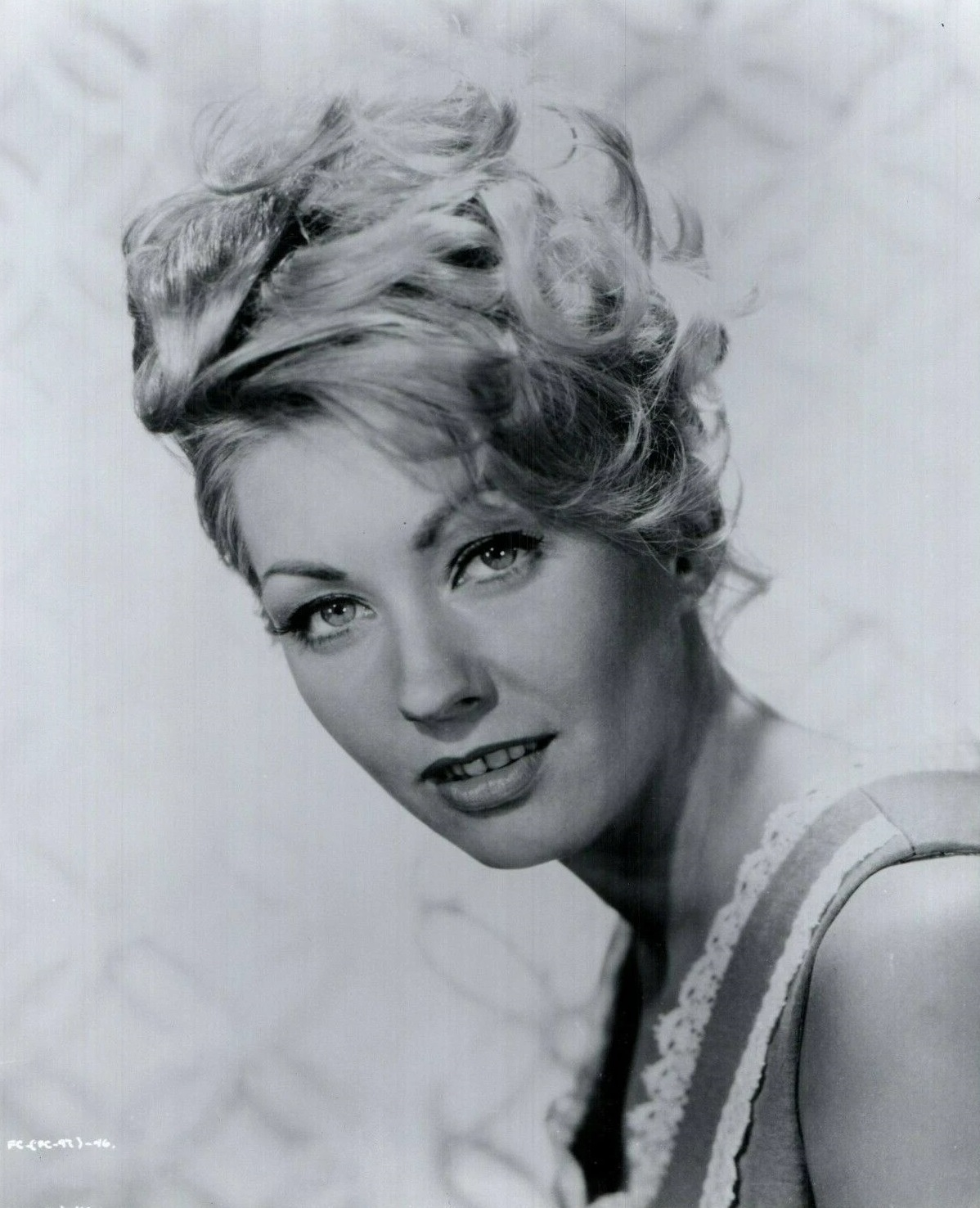
- Born: December 15, 1942 (age 83)
- Occupation: Actress
- Known for: Actress
- Spouse: John Rubinstein (m. 1971; div. 1992)

Judi West (born December 15, 1942) is an American actress, best known for her supporting role opposite Jack Lemmon in the comedy film The Fortune Cookie (1966) in which she sang the 1942 Cole Porter song "You'd Be So Nice to Come Home To".

== Biography ==
Judi West acted in a few films in the 1960s and also appeared in television in the 1960s through the early 1980s, including the role of April Lavery in the 1971 Gunsmoke episode "Lavery" (S16E22). Her main film appearances include:

- The Fortune Cookie, directed by Billy Wilder (US, 1966) - Sandy Hinkle
- La Donna, il sesso e il superuomo, directed by Sergio Spina (Italy, 1967) - Deborah Sands
- A Man Called Gannon, directed by James Goldstone (US, 1968) - Beth Cross

She had earlier worked on the Broadway stage including A Family Affair (1962) and She Loves Me (1963-1964).

Married from 1971 to 1992 to actor John Rubinstein.
