= Gambit (2012 film) =

2012 film by Michael Hoffman

- UK theatrical release poster
- Directed by: Michael Hoffman
- Screenplay by: Joel Coen; Ethan Coen
- Based on: Gambit; 1966 film by: Jack Davies; Alvin Sargent; Sidney Carroll
- Produced by: Mike Lobell; Rob Paris; Adam Ripp
- Starring: Colin Firth; Cameron Diaz; Alan Rickman; Tom Courtenay; Stanley Tucci
- Cinematography: Florian Ballhaus
- Edited by: Paul Tothill
- Music by: Rolfe Kent
- Production companies: Crime Scene Pictures; ArtPhyl; FilmNation Entertainment
- Distributed by: CBS Films (United States); Momentum Pictures (United Kingdom)
- Release dates: 7 November 2012 (Empire Leicester Square); 21 November 2012 (United Kingdom); 25 April 2014 (United States)
- Running time: 89 minutes
- Countries: United Kingdom; United States
- Language: English
- Box office: $14.2 million

Gambit is a 2012 heist comedy film directed by Michael Hoffman from a screenplay by Joel and Ethan Coen, starring Colin Firth, Cameron Diaz, Alan Rickman, Tom Courtenay and Stanley Tucci. It is a remake of the 1966 film starring Shirley MacLaine and Michael Caine.

An art curator schemes to get even with his abusive billionaire boss by enlisting an eccentric Texas rodeo queen to trick him into buying a fake Monet painting.

The film premiered at the Empire Leicester Square in London on 7 November 2012, and was released in the United Kingdom on 21 November by Momentum Pictures. In the United States, Gambit was released in select theaters and through video on demand on 25 April 2014 by CBS Films.

== Plot ==
British art curator Harry Deane seeks revenge on his abusive boss Lord Lionel Shabandar by conning him into buying a fake Monet (Haystacks at Dusk), to complement one he already has (Haystacks at Dawn). He teams up with a master art forger, the Major, and travels to Alpine, Texas where he locates for rodeo queen PJ Puznowski, the granddaughter of the sergeant responsible for capturing Hermann Göring in 1945. Harry enlists her, explaining that her participation will lend authenticity since the Monet was last seen at Carinhall after being plundered by the Nazis. The three drive into the desert a mobile home where PJ and her grandmother pose for photos with the fake Monet. The pictures accompany an article on the rodeo queen in a magazine that is part of Shabandar's media empire.

Harry meets with Shabandar in London and discusses the photos. Shabandar dismissed the Monet a reproduction, since it is hanging on the wall of a mobile home in Texas. Harry convinces him to try and authenticate it, since the painting is so rarely reproduced. PJ offers the painting to Shabandar for £12 million, but only after arranging to meet him at the Savoy Hotel. Harry's frustration at the cost of the hotel room is magnified when PJ accepts Shabandar's romantic overtures. Shabandar meets PJ and tells her he is replacing Harry with art curator Martin Zaidenweber, since he considers Harry an idiot. PJ tells Zaidenweber the painting has been in her house since she was a little girl. PJ returns to the hotel and tells Harry she wants no more part in his plan.

Dining with Shabandar again, they're interrupted by his rival businessman, Akira Takagawa, who wants revenge for losing the Haystacks auction to him in 1992. Harry meanwhile has convinced Zaidenweber to abandon his partnership with Shabandar. PJ agrees once more to work with Harry, and they attend Shabandar's masquerade ball. As Shabandar is about to inspect the painting, Zaidenweber arrives, still loyal to Shabandar. He announces the painting is real, but Harry objects and wipes away paint to reveal the likeness of Queen Elizabeth II underneath. Shabandar announces PJ will be no further use to him and tries to re-hire Harry. Harry turns him down, disapproving of the way Shabandar has treated PJ.

Harry and the Major meet with Takagawa and his men and reveal the Major had painted copies for both Dusk and Dawn paintings. Harry had removed the real Dawn painting and switched it with its copy. Takagawa tells Harry that his payment for the real Haystacks at Dawn by Monet, £10 million, has been transferred to his Swiss bank account. Harry and the Major thank Takagawa and leave.

Meanwhile, while PJ goes through airport security, she finds a painting from Harry and smiles. Harry and the Major walk through the airport talking about Donald Trump's fascination with Picasso.

== Cast ==
- Cameron Diaz as PJ Puznowski
- Colin Firth as Harry Deane
- Alan Rickman as Lord Lionel Shabandar
- Tom Courtenay as The Major
- Stanley Tucci as Martin Zaidenweber
- Cloris Leachman as Grandma
- Togo Igawa as Takagawa

== Production ==
=== Development and writing ===
A remake of Gambit had been mooted for several years. Producer Mike Lobell saw the original film at its London premiere in 1966, and in 1997, Lobell, who was then working at Universal, was looking for a film to remake; he suggested Gambit and Universal approved it. He initially sent the original script to Aaron Sorkin to rewrite it; however, despite being keen to work on the project, the success of Sports Night and more especially The West Wing meant that he could not commit to completing the rewrite. After Sorkin pulled out, Lobell met British producer Andy Paterson, director Anand Tucker and writer Frank Cottrell Boyce. Boyce produced a script moving the story to Japan, but Lobell did not think it was funny enough and decided to move on. Hearing that Joel and Ethan Coen were looking for some rewrite work between films, Lobell gave them the script and they produced a "radical overhaul", moving the story to the United States. The Coens were told the film was specifically intended for Hugh Grant. Half an hour after submitting their completed script, they were informed that Grant had chosen to pass on it. The project remained in development hell.

Initially, Alexander Payne was in talks to direct it, reuniting with Election star Reese Witherspoon, but was reluctant to work on a script he did not write. Witherspoon was willing to remain on the project, but only if Lobell could get Mike Nichols or Robert Altman to direct. After the success of Gosford Park (2001), Altman was keen to make another film in the United Kingdom, especially as Witherspoon was attached. However, prior to signing on, Altman backed out, feeling that the material was not suitable for him. Nichols was not interested and the project stalled.

In March 2004, Jennifer Aniston was announced as the female lead alongside Ben Kingsley, with Bo Welch directing. After the commercial failure of Welch's 2003 live-action adaptation of Dr. Seuss's The Cat in the Hat, Universal lost faith in the project and put it into turnaround. Outside of the studio system, Lobell moved between different financiers in a bid to get the project moving. One group, Alcon Entertainment, had Gerard Butler lined up as Harry Deane, with Richard LaGravenese directing. LaGravenese wanted a script polish, which took a long time, removing a lot of the work the Coen brothers had done. The project was placed on hold again.

The script was well known around Hollywood, and in 2009, Lobell took a call from Roeg Sutherland at CAA. Sutherland knew of a fledgling production company, Crime Scene Pictures, with equity financing from Southeast Asia, who were looking for a marquee project for their new company and felt that Gambit would fit the bill. In 2010, Doug Liman was reportedly considering directing the film. Although initially reluctant to take the project, Lobell persuaded Michael Hoffman to helm the film. In October 2011, Rolfe Kent signed on to compose the score for the film.

=== Casting ===
In an interview in September 2008, Colin Firth denied being involved in the remake. Nevertheless, it was confirmed in February 2011 that Firth and Cameron Diaz had been cast in the lead roles. Alan Rickman was added to the cast the following month, with Stanley Tucci and Cloris Leachman joining in May.

=== Filming ===
Principal photography began in London on 5 May 2011. That July, scenes were filmed in and around Carrizozo, Galisteo, Laguna Pueblo, Los Lunas, Rio Rancho and Socorro, in New Mexico, as well as at the Compton Verney Art Gallery in Warwickshire. Filming wrapped on 28 July 2011, lasting approximately 60 days.

== Release ==
Gambit had its world premiere at the Empire Leicester Square in London on 7 November 2012, and was released in the United Kingdom on 21 November by Momentum Pictures.

In March 2011, CBS Films acquired US distribution rights to the film. Originally scheduled for a wide release in the United States on 11 January 2013, Gambit was moved up to 12 October 2012, before being moved back to early 2013. Due to low international box-office returns and unfavourable reviews, CBS Films released the film simultaneously in 10 theaters and through video on demand in the United States on 25 April 2014. It was released on DVD and Blu-ray on 27 May 2014 by Sony Pictures Home Entertainment.

== Reception ==
The film grossed $1.9 million in the United Kingdom and a worldwide total of $14.2 million.

Gambit received negative reviews. On the review aggregator website Rotten Tomatoes, the film holds an approval rating of 18% based on 45 reviews, with an average rating of 4.2/10. The website's critics consensus reads, "A curiously charmless caper that squanders a starry cast and screenplay by the Coen brothers, this Gambit doesn't pay off."
