= The Professionals (1966 film) =

1966 film by Richard Brooks

- Theatrical release poster by Howard Terpning
- Directed by: Richard Brooks
- Written by: Richard Brooks
- Based on: A Mule for the Marquesa (1964 novel) by Frank O'Rourke
- Produced by: Richard Brooks
- Starring: Burt Lancaster; Lee Marvin; Robert Ryan; Woody Strode; Jack Palance; Ralph Bellamy; Claudia Cardinale
- Cinematography: Conrad L. Hall
- Edited by: Peter Zinner
- Music by: Maurice Jarre
- Production company: Pax Enterprises
- Distributed by: Columbia Pictures
- Release date: November 4, 1966
- Running time: 117 minutes
- Country: United States
- Languages: English; Spanish
- Box office: $19.5 million

The Professionals is a 1966 American revisionist Western film written, directed, and produced by Richard Brooks and starring Burt Lancaster, Lee Marvin, Robert Ryan and Woody Strode, with Jack Palance, Claudia Cardinale and Ralph Bellamy in supporting roles. Based on the 1964 novel A Mule for the Marquesa by Frank O'Rourke, it is about four mercenaries who are hired to rescue a kidnapped bride amidst the Mexican Revolution.

Released by Columbia Pictures, the film was a critical and commercial success. At the 39th Academy Awards, the film received nominations for Best Director, Best Adapted Screenplay, and Best Cinematography – Color. It was also nominated for two Golden Globe Awards, including Best Motion Picture – Drama.

== Plot ==
In the final years of the Mexican Revolution, wealthy American rancher J.W. Grant hires four mercenaries to rescue his kidnapped wife, Maria, from Jesús Raza, a former revolutionary leader-turned-bandit. All the men experts in their fields: Henry "Rico" Fardan is a weapons specialist, Bill Dolworth is an explosives expert, Hans Ehrengard is the horse wrangler, and Jake Sharp is a traditional Apache scout, skilled with a bow and arrow. Fardan and Dolworth, having both fought under the command of Pancho Villa, have a high regard for Raza as a soldier, but have no qualms about killing him.

After entering Mexico, the professionals witness Raza's small army massacering soldiers on a government train. They follow the captured train to the end of the line, then take it over after the bandits leave. Moving on to the camp, they observe Raza and his followers — including a female soldier, Chiquita, a lusty former lover of Dolworth. At nightfall, Fardan and Dolworth infiltrate the camp. They see Maria about to willingly make love to Raza and recognize they've been had. Fardan stops Dolworth from killing Raza, who is knocked out instead.

After bringing Maria back to the train, the professionals find it has been retaken by the bandits. Threatening to kill Maria, they get it back. Pursued by Raza and his men, the professionals are forced to take refuge in nearby canyon lands. That night, Maria reveals that they haven't rescued Grant's "kidnapped wife" but Raza's longtime lover — that Grant had just bought her in an arranged marriage, from which she escaped at the earliest opportunity to return to her true love in Mexico.

The following day, Maria escapes toward a narrow canyon to rejoin Raza, but Dolworth sets off explosives he had planted in the canyon walls, which close it off. As Raza and his remaining men seek another route to renew their chase, Dolworth volunteers to stay behind and stage a rear guard action to allow the others to continue their retreat. In the ensuing fight, Raza is wounded and captured, and Dolworth is almost killed by a dying Chiquita, whose pistol proves out of bullets.

Grant and his men meet the professionals with Maria and Raza in tow at the US border. The men watch as Grant assaults Maria when she stands up to him and declares intends to run away again first chance. Grant tells Fardan that their contract has been satisfactorily concluded. He then orders one of his men to kill Raza. Before he can fire, Dolworth shoots the gun from his hand. The other professionals step in to protect Maria and Raza. They lay Raza on the back of a horse-drawn wagon with Maria at the reins, and send both back to Mexico. Fardan coldly tells Grant that the kidnapper they rescued Maria from is Grant himself.

Grant angrily calls Fardan a "bastard", which Fardan parries: "In my case an accident of birth. But you, sir, you're a self-made man."

The professionals then ride off, following the wagon back towards Mexico.

== Cast ==
- Burt Lancaster as Dolworth
- Lee Marvin as Fardan
- Robert Ryan as Ehrengard
- Woody Strode as Jake
- Jack Palance as Raza
- Claudia Cardinale as Maria
- Ralph Bellamy as Grant
- Joe De Santis as Ortega
- Rafael Bertrand as Fierro
- Jorge Martínez de Hoyos as Padillia
- Marie Gomez as Chiquita
- Jose Chávez as Revolutionary
- Carlos Romero as Revolutionary
- Vaughn Taylor as Banker

== Production ==
=== Writing ===
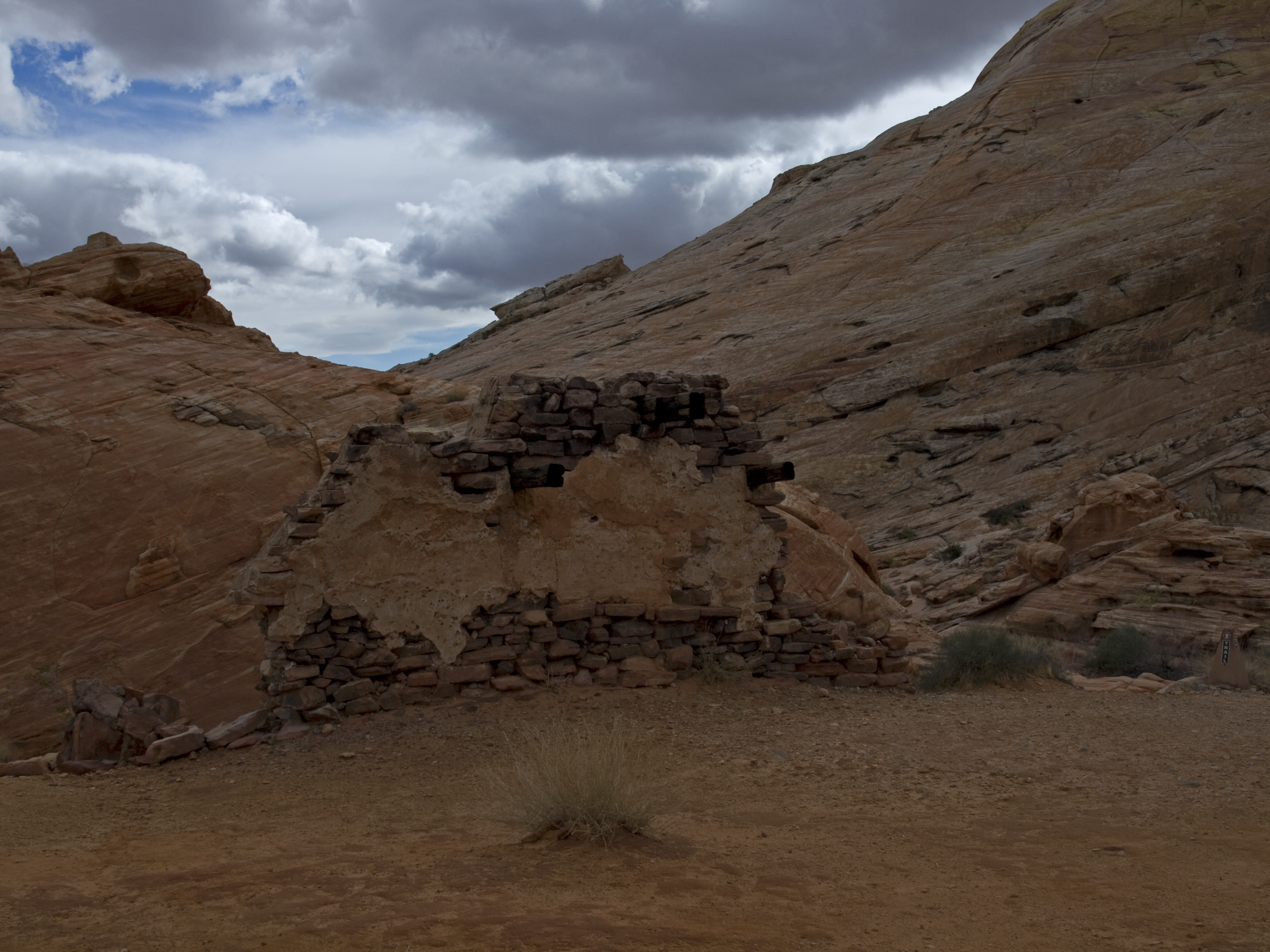
The remains of the Mexican hacienda set for the film, at the Valley of Fire State Park in Nevada, March 2012

The film was adapted for the screen by its director Richard Brooks, who based the screenplay on the novel A Mule for the Marquesa by Frank O'Rourke.

=== Filming ===
Richard Brooks originally wanted to shoot the film on-location in Mexico, until he learned the necessary locations were thousands of miles apart. The movie, which was shot in Technicolor, was filmed in Death Valley and the Coachella Valley in California, as well as Valley of Fire State Park in Nevada. The rail scenes were filmed on Kaiser Steel's Eagle Mountain Railroad. The steam locomotive seen in the movie currently resides on the Heber Valley Railroad.

During filming, the cast and crew stayed in Las Vegas. Actor Woody Strode wrote in his memoir Goal Dust that he and Lee Marvin got into a lot of pranks, on one occasion shooting an arrow into Vegas Vic, the famous smiling cowboy neon sign outside The Pioneer Club.

== Reception ==
=== Box office ===
By 1976, it was estimated the film had earned $8.8 million in rentals in North America.

It was the ninth most popular movie at the French box office in 1966, after La Grande Vadrouille, Doctor Zhivago, Is Paris Burning?, A Fistful of Dollars, Lost Command, A Man and a Woman, For a Few Dollars More and The Big Restaurant.

=== Critical response ===
Variety wrote of the film:

The Professionals is a well-made actioner, set in 1917 on the Mexican-US border, in which some soldiers of fortune rescue the reportedly kidnapped wife of an American businessman. Exciting explosive sequences, good overall pacing, and acting overcome a sometimes thin script...

Quiet and purposeful, Marvin underplays very well as the leader of the rescue troop.

Film critic Roger Ebert, in a 1967 review, notes, "Last year, Richard Brooks' The Professionals was the best-directed film out of Hollywood...

On Rotten Tomatoes, the film has an approval rating of 90% based on reviews from 20 critics.

=== Award and nominations ===
Award	Category	Nominee(s)	Result
Academy Awards	Best Director	Richard Brooks	Nominated
Academy Awards	Best Screenplay – Based on Material from Another Medium	Richard Brooks	Nominated
Academy Awards	Best Cinematography – Color	Conrad L. Hall	Nominated
American Cinema Editors Awards	Best Edited Feature Film	Peter Zinner	Nominated
Directors Guild of America Awards	Outstanding Directorial Achievement in Motion Pictures	Richard Brooks	Nominated
Golden Globe Awards	Best Motion Picture – Drama		Nominated
Golden Globe Awards	Most Promising Newcomer – Female	Marie Gomez	Nominated
Golden Screen Awards			Won
Laurel Awards	Top Action Drama		Won
Laurel Awards	Top Action Performance	Lee Marvin	Won
Turkish Film Critics Association Awards	Best Foreign Film		5th Place
Writers Guild of America Awards	Best Written American Drama	Richard Brooks	Nominated

== Soundtrack ==
The musical score was composed by Maurice Jarre.

== See also ==
- List of American films of 1966
