= The Bravados =

1958 film by Henry King

- Theatrical release poster
- Directed by: Henry King
- Screenplay by: Philip Yordan
- Based on: The Bravados by Frank O'Rourke
- Produced by: Herbert B. Swope Jr.
- Starring: Gregory Peck; Joan Collins
- Cinematography: Leon Shamroy
- Edited by: William Mace
- Music by: Alfred Newman; Hugo Friedhofer; Lionel Newman
- Distributed by: 20th Century-Fox
- Release date: June 25, 1958 (United States)
- Running time: 98 minutes
- Country: United States
- Languages: English; Spanish
- Box office: $2.2 million

The Bravados is a 1958 American Cinemascope Western film (color by DeLuxe) directed by Henry King, starring Gregory Peck and Joan Collins. The CinemaScope film was based on a novel of the same name, written by Frank O'Rourke.

== Plot ==
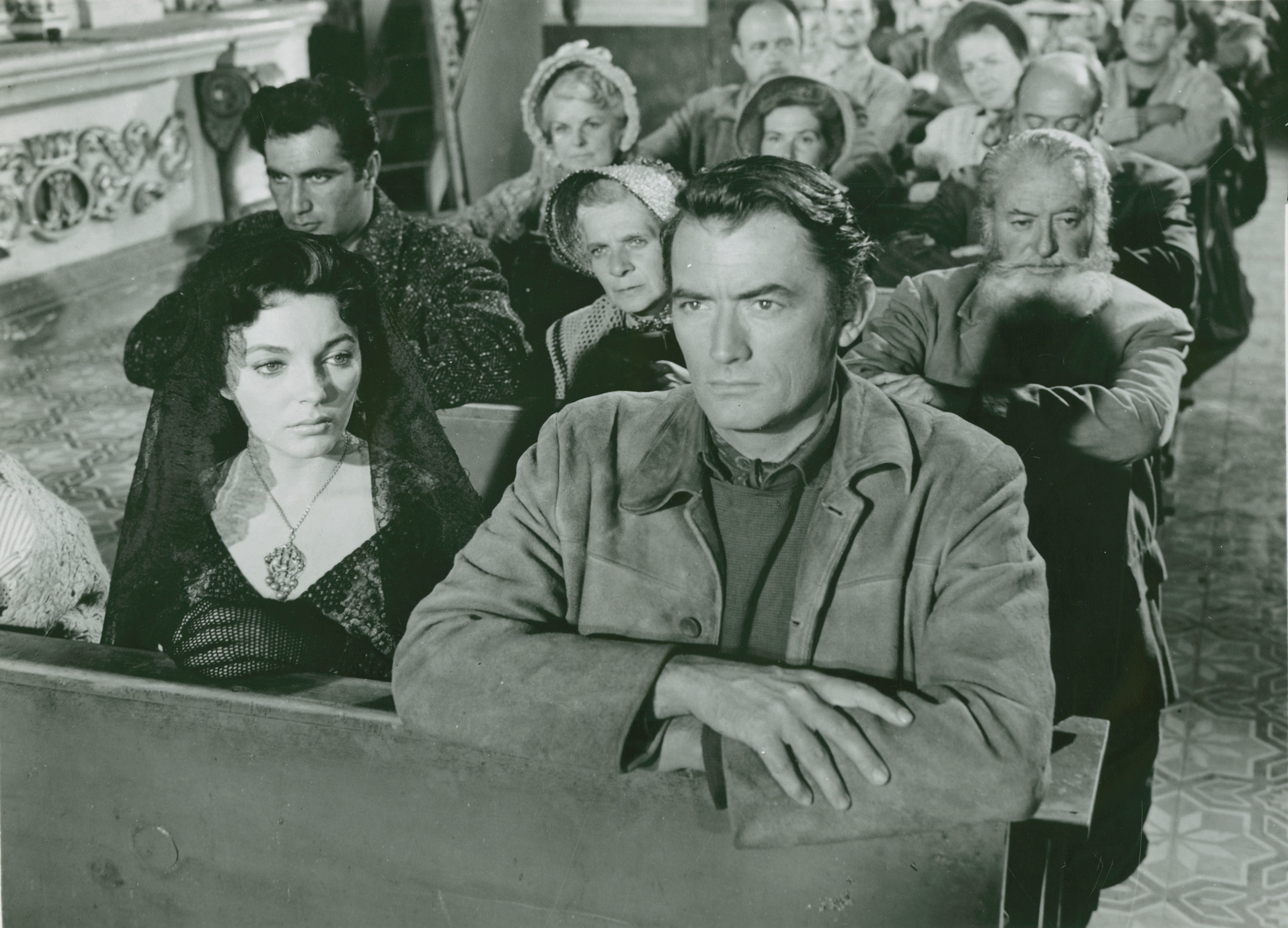
Joan Collins and Gregory Peck in a film still

Jim Douglass is a rancher pursuing four outlaws he is convinced murdered his wife six months before. He rides into Rio Arriba, where these four men, Alfonso Parral, Bill Zachary, Ed Taylor and Lujan, are in jail awaiting execution for an unrelated murder and is allowed to see them by Sheriff Eloy Sanchez.

In town, Douglass meets Josefa Velarde, whom he met and fell in love with nearly five years previously in New Orleans. She has been looking after her late father's ranch and has never married. Douglass reveals that he is now a widower and has a daughter; Josefa later learns, from Rio Arriba's priest, the truth of how Douglass' wife died.

The designated executioner arrives and goes to check the men's height and weight in the jail. He is an imposter however and stabs the sheriff, who then manages to shoot and kill him. The four inmates escape though and take a young woman named Emma hostage. A posse rides in pursuit and Douglass joins them the following day, when they find the body of the real executioner, who was ambushed.

The outlaws realize that Douglass is the man they must deal with, and Parral is assigned the job of ambushing him. He fails and Douglass kills him after showing him a photograph of his dead wife, despite him denying any knowledge of her. Douglass continues to trail the remaining three, confronting Taylor who he captures and ropes by his feet, hanging him upside-down from a tree.

The two remaining fugitives reach the house of John Butler, a miner and Douglass' neighbor. Butler tells the men he needs to get to work outside and tries to escape. Zachary shoots and kills him, whilst Lujan goes to retrieve a sack of coins which Butler had taken with him. While Lujan is doing this, Zachary rapes Emma and, after seeing riders approaching, they both flee, leaving the girl behind. The riders turn out to be Josefa and one of her ranch hands, who spot Douglass coming from another direction. The main posse also arrives.

Douglass goes to his ranch to get fresh mounts, but finds that the fugitives have taken his last horses. In a town just across the Mexican border, Douglass finds Zachary in a bar. The outlaw claims not to know the woman in the picture Douglass shows him, but Douglass draws his gun and shoots him dead. He then goes on to the home of the fourth man, Lujan, who has a family of his own. When shown the photo of Douglass's wife, Lujan also says he has never seen her before. Douglass points to Lujan's sack of coins and tells him that whoever killed his wife stole that from his ranch. Lujan explains that he took the bag from Butler, whereupon Douglass realizes that Butler was the murderer.

Now knowing that the four men whom he pursued had nothing to do with his wife's death, Douglass regrets having killed three of them. He returns to town and goes to the church to ask for forgiveness. The priest says that while he cannot condone Douglass' actions, he respects him for not making excuses for what he has done. Josefa arrives with Douglass' daughter and they exit the church together.

== Cast ==
- Gregory Peck as Jim Douglass
- Joan Collins as Josefa Velarde
- Stephen Boyd as Bill Zachary
- Albert Salmi as Ed Taylor
- Henry Silva as Lujan
- Kathleen Gallant as Emma Steimmetz
- Barry Coe as Thomas
- George Voskovec as Gus Steinmetz
- Herbert Rudley as Sheriff Eloy Sanchez
- Lee Van Cleef as Alfonso Parral
- Andrew Duggan as Padre
- Ken Scott as Deputy Sheriff Primo
- Gene Evans as Butler
- Joe DeRita as Simms' Impostor
- Jason Wingreen as Nichols
- Ada Carrasco as Mrs. Parral

The film is notable for including a rare serious role for Joe DeRita who, around the time the film was released, became "Curly Joe" of The Three Stooges.

== Production ==
The Bravados was filmed in Morelia, Mexico. According to Stephen Boyd, filming was difficult because it was unusually rainy and cold for the region.

== Reception ==
=== Critical response ===
When the film was released The New York Times film critic, A. H. Weiler, gave it a positive review, writing, "...The Bravados emerges as a credit to its makers. Director Henry King, who headed the troupe that journeyed down to the photogenic areas of Mexico's Michoacán and Jalisco provinces, has seen to it that his cast and story move at an unflagging pace...The canyons, towering mountains, forests and waterfalls of the natural locales used, make picturesque material for the color cameras. But the producers have given their essentially grim 'chase' equally colorful and arresting treatment."

On review aggregator website Rotten Tomatoes, the film holds an approval rating of 100% based on 5 critic reviews with an average rating of 8/10.

=== Awards and nominations ===
Award	Category	Nominee(s)	Result
Laurel Awards	Top Action Performance	Gregory Peck	Nominated
National Board of Review Awards	Best Supporting Actor	Albert Salmi (also for The Brothers Karamazov)	Won

== Adaptations ==
The film was later adapted into Malay by the late P. Ramlee in 1969 as Enam Jahanam (Six Plunderers). The film shared the same story premise as The Bravados, but unlike the previous film, the main character used tekpi and silat as his main weapon.

== See also ==
- List of American films of 1958
