= The Fortune Cookie =

1966 film by Billy Wilder

- Theatrical release poster
- Directed by: Billy Wilder
- Written by: Billy Wilder; I. A. L. Diamond
- Produced by: Billy Wilder
- Starring: Jack Lemmon; Walter Matthau; Ron Rich; Cliff Osmond; Judi West
- Cinematography: Joseph LaShelle
- Edited by: Daniel Mandell
- Music by: André Previn
- Production companies: The Mirisch Corporation; Phalanx Productions; Jalem Productions
- Distributed by: United Artists
- Release date: October 19, 1966 (New York City)
- Running time: 125 minutes
- Language: English
- Budget: $3.7 million
- Box office: $6.8 million

The Fortune Cookie (released in the United Kingdom as Meet Whiplash Willie) is a 1966 American black comedy film directed, produced and co-written by Billy Wilder. It is the first film in which Jack Lemmon collaborated with Walter Matthau. Matthau won an Academy Award for Best Supporting Actor for his performance. The film was co-produced by Wilder's Phalanx Productions in cooperation with Lemmon's independent film production company, Jalem Productions.

== Plot ==
CBS cameraman Harold "Harry" Hinkle is injured when (fictional) football player Luther "Boom Boom" Jackson of the Cleveland Browns collides with him during a home game at Municipal Stadium. Though Harry's injuries are minor, his conniving lawyer brother-in-law, William H. "Whiplash Willie" Gingrich, convinces him to pretend that his leg and hand have been partially paralyzed so that they can receive a huge indemnity from the insurance company. Initially opposed, Harry goes along with the scheme after his ex-wife, Sandy, with whom he is still in love, phones to ask about his condition.

The insurance company's lawyers, O'Brien, Thompson, and Kincaid, suspect the paralysis is fake, but all but one of their medical experts say it is real. The experts are convinced by a compressed vertebra injury Harry sustained as a child, enhanced by Harry's responses, along with the numbing novocaine injections given by a paroled dentist engaged by Willie. The one holdout, Swiss Professor Winterhalter, is convinced Harry is a fraud.

Without medical evidence to base their case on, the lawyers hire Cleveland's best private detective, Chester Purkey, to keep Harry under constant surveillance. When he sees Purkey enter the apartment building across the street, however, Willie lets Harry know they are being watched and recorded. After Sandy arrives, he warns Harry not to indulge in any hanky-panky with her. Willie proceeds to feed misinformation to Purkey; he incorporates the "Harry Hinkle Foundation", a non-profit charity to which all the proceeds of any settlement are to go, above and beyond the medical expenses.

When Sandy questions Willie about this in private, he tells her that it is just a scam to put pressure on the insurance company to settle, and that there will be enough money in the settlement for everyone. Harry begins to enjoy having Sandy back again, but he feels bad when he sees Boom-Boom is so guilt-ridden that his performance on the field suffers. After being booed by fans, Boom-Boom is then grounded by the team for getting drunk and involved in a bar fight.

Harry wants Willie to represent Boom-Boom, but Willie says that he is too busy negotiating with O'Brien, Thompson and Kincaid. After Harry obtains a $200,000 settlement check, he learns that Sandy has returned to him strictly out of greed. However, Purkey has a plan to expose the scam. Showing up at the apartment, supposedly to collect his microphones, Purkey makes racist remarks about Boom-Boom. Incensed, Harry jumps up from his wheelchair and decks Purkey, but Purkey's assistant Max is not sure if he recorded it on film because "it's a little dark". Harry asks Purkey if he would like a second take, turns on a light, and advises the cameraman on how to set his exposure. Punching Purkey again, he follows up by swinging from curtain rods and bouncing on the bed. Just before Harry leaves the apartment, he sees Sandy crawling on the floor looking for her lost contact lens; he pushes her down to the ground with his foot.

Claiming he had no idea his client was deceiving him, Willie tears up the settlement check, declaring no fraud exists if money does not change hands. He announces his intention to sue the insurance company lawyers for invasion of privacy, as well as report Purkey's racist remarks to various organizations. Harry drives to the stadium, where he finds Boom-Boom leaving the team to become a wrestler named "The Dark Angel". Harry manages to snap him out of that state, and the two run down the field passing a football back and forth.

== Cast ==
- Jack Lemmon as Harold "Harry" Hinkle
- Walter Matthau as William H. "Whiplash Willie" Gingrich
- Ron Rich as Luther "Boom Boom" Jackson
- Judi West as Sandy Hinkle
- Cliff Osmond as Chester Purkey
- Lurene Tuttle as Hinkle's mother
- Harry Holcombe as O'Brien
- Les Tremayne as Thompson
- Lauren Gilbert as Kincaid
- Marge Redmond as Charlotte Gingrich
- Noam Pitlik as Max
- Keith Jackson as football announcer
- Harry Davis as Dr. Krugman
- Ann Shoemaker as Sister Veronica
- Ned Glass as Doc Schindler
- Jon Silo as Tailer
- Sig Ruman as Professor Winterhalter
- Archie Moore as Mr. Jackson
- Howard McNear as Mr. Cimoli
- William Christopher as Intern (credited as Bill Christopher)
- Dodie Heath as Nun
- Judy Pace as Elvira

== Production ==
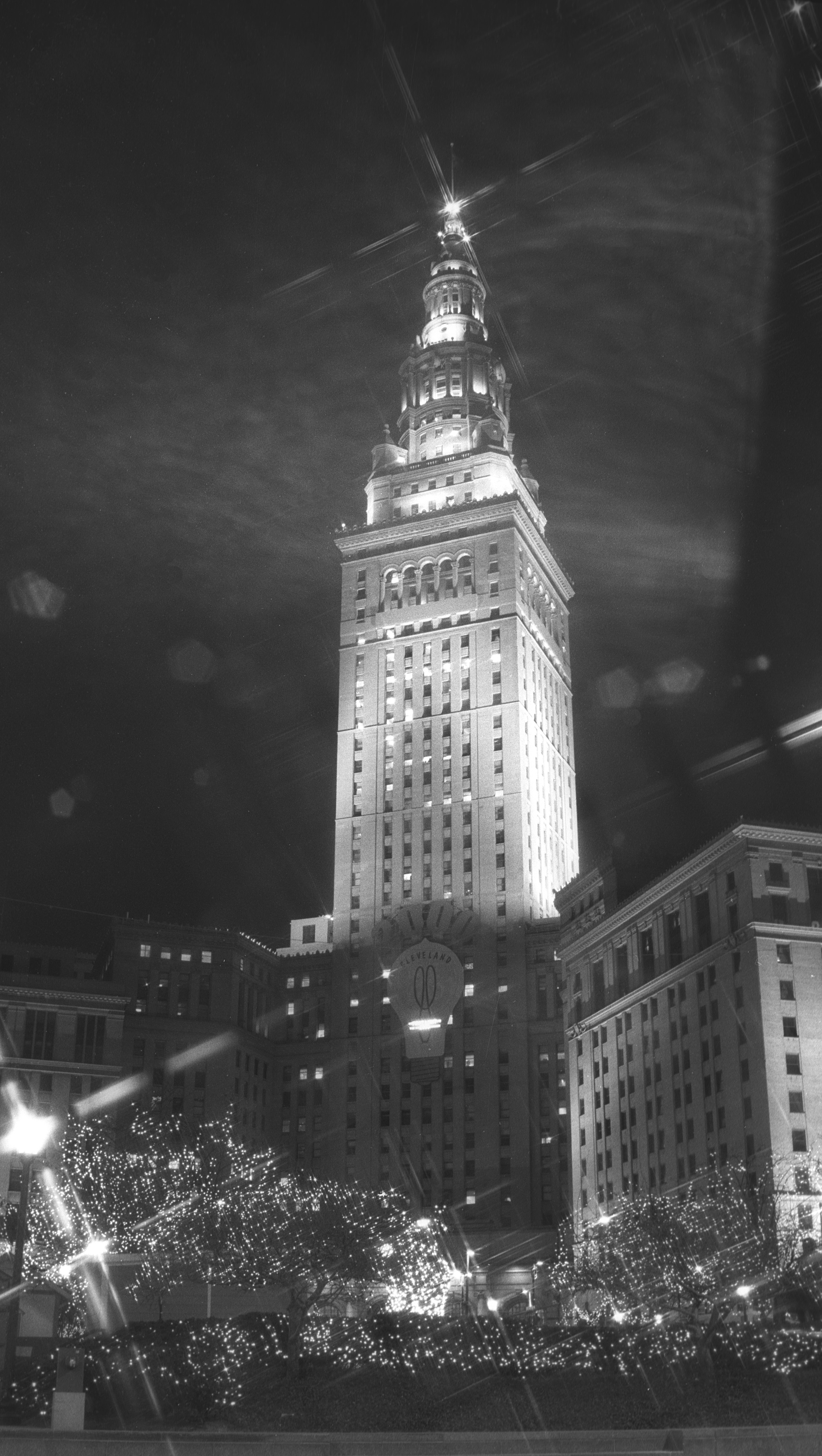
Terminal Tower, a major Cleveland landmark, served as the exterior for the law firms in the film.

Wilder had Matthau in mind when he wrote the part of "Whiplash Willie". He hoped it would boost his career in movies, but the studio wanted a bigger name. Lemmon originally had two other actors proposed to star with him—Frank Sinatra and Jackie Gleason—but Wilder insisted that he do the picture with Matthau.

Production on the film was halted for weeks after Matthau had a heart attack. By the time he was healthy enough to work and filming started up again, he had slimmed down from 190 to 160 pounds and had to wear a heavy black coat and padded clothing to conceal the weight loss. Lemmon also lost 25 pounds during the production.

Scenes were filmed at Cleveland Municipal Stadium during the Cleveland Browns' 27–17 loss to the Minnesota Vikings on the afternoon of October 31, 1965. Over 10,000 Clevelanders served as extras. According to The Saturday Evening Post, additional footage was shot the day after the game with Browns players as themselves and the Vikings.

Luther "Boom Boom" Jackson's uniform number 44 was actually worn by Leroy Kelly, who was deemed "too small to pass for actor Ron Rich at close range", according to the Post. Ernie Green and a stunt performer stood in for Rich, with the latter for only the sideline-collision scene. On the third consecutive day of shooting, the Kent State University freshman football team replaced the Browns, who were unavailable due to beginning preparations for their next opponent.

Saint Mark's Hospital in the film is the newly completed St. Vincent Charity Hospital, a curved building considered ultramodern at that time. An exterior scene was filmed on East 24th Street, outside an older section of the hospital. Terminal Tower served as the exterior of the law firm. In one scene, one can see Erieview Tower and the steel skeleton of the Anthony J. Celebrezze Federal Building under construction.

It featured the 1942 Cole Porter song "You'd Be So Nice to Come Home To" sung by Judi West.

== Reception ==
Vincent Canby of The New York Times called the film "a fine, dark, gag-filled hallucination, peopled by dropouts from the Great Society" and "an explosively funny live-action cartoon about petty chiselers who regard the economic system as a giant pinball machine, ready to pay off to anyone who tilts it properly".

Variety found the film "generally amusing (often wildly so), but overlong".

The Hollywood Reporter asserted that The Fortune Cookie was "Billy Wilder's best picture since The Apartment, his funniest since Some Like It Hot".

On the review aggregator website Rotten Tomatoes, 96% of 28 critics' reviews are positive. The website's consensus reads: "Uniting Jack Lemmon and a never-better Walter Matthau on the screen for the first time, The Fortune Cookie continues director Billy Wilder's winning streak of sweet comedies with a nice snap."

== Box office ==
The film grossed $6 million at the North American box office, making it the 31st highest-grossing film of 1966. The film earned $6.8 million worldwide.

== Awards and Accolades ==
Award	Category	Nominee(s)	Result	Ref.
Academy Awards	Best Supporting Actor	Walter Matthau	Won	
Academy Awards	Best Story and Screenplay – Written Directly for the Screen	Billy Wilder and I. A. L. Diamond	Nominated	
Academy Awards	Best Art Direction – Black-and-White	Robert Luthardt and Edward G. Boyle	Nominated	
Academy Awards	Best Cinematography – Black-and-White	Joseph LaShelle	Nominated	
Golden Globe Awards	Best Actor in a Motion Picture – Musical or Comedy	Walter Matthau	Nominated	
Kansas City Film Critics Circle Awards	Best Supporting Actor	Walter Matthau	Won	
Laurel Awards	Top Male Supporting Performance	Walter Matthau	Won	
Writers Guild of America Awards	Best Written American Comedy	Billy Wilder and I. A. L. Diamond	Nominated	

== See also ==
- List of American films of 1966
