= Robert Luthardt =

American art director

- Born: March 3, 1917
- Died: October 1, 1977 (aged 60); San Diego, California
- Occupation: Art director
- Years active: 1962-1977

Robert Luthardt (March 3, 1917 – October 1, 1977) was an American art director. He was nominated for an Academy Award in the category Best Art Direction for The Fortune Cookie.

== Selected filmography ==
- The Fortune Cookie (1966)
