= Saint Matthew Passion (film) =

1966 film

- Directed by: Tamás Czigány
- Release date: 1966
- Country: Hungary
- Language: Hungarian

Saint Matthew Passion (Hungarian: Részletek J.S. Bach Máté passiójából) is a 1966 Hungarian short documentary film directed by Tamás Czigány. It was nominated for an Academy Award for Best Documentary Short.
