= John Sturtevant =

Set decorator

- Born: April 28, 1913
- Died: May 10, 1974 (aged 61)
- Occupation: Set decorator

John Sturtevant (April 28, 1913 – May 10, 1974) was an American set decorator. He was nominated for an Academy Award in the category Best Art Direction for the film The Sand Pebbles.

== Selected filmography ==
- The Sand Pebbles (1966)
