= Lee R. Bobker =

American filmmaker, producer, writer

Lee Robert Bobker (July 19, 1925 – December 28, 1999) was an American writer, film director and producer, primarily known for his documentary films. He was nominated for three Academy Awards and one Emmy.

== Life and career ==
Bobker was born in Belle Harbor, in Queens, New York. He began to work as a director and producer of documentary films in the late 1950s. He made a film for the Peabody Coal Company that was "an apology for coal mining" and directed All the Way Home, a 1957 film written by Muriel Rukeyser about the community reaction when a white homeowner in an all-white area decides to sell his house to a black family. In 1958, he made the documentary, Psychiatric Nursing, which was nominated for an Academy Award for Documentary Feature in 1958 and Crisis in Levittown, both for Dynamic Films, Inc. He directed The Unending Struggle (1965) documenting the US Alliance for Progress in Ecuador.

In 1966, he made The Odds Against about the correctional system with Helen Kristt Radin. It was nominated for an Academy Award in 1966 for an Academy Award for Best Documentary (Short Subject). His film The Revolving Door was nominated in 1968 for best documentary short film. Bobker's The First Amendment, produced for the American Library Association, was about censorship.

Bobker's PBS television series I, Leonardo, which starred Frank Langella as Leonardo da Vinci, was nominated for an Emmy award. Chandler Knowles and Radin were co-producers with Bobker on the 1983 series. In the early 1990s, Bobker began working in cable television and made the documentary Isaac Stern, a Life, which was critically acclaimed. Bobker won acclaim at both national and international film festivals, collecting hundreds of awards.

Bobker wrote two textbooks about filmmaking and aesthetics and contributed to professional periodicals, as well as other publications.

Bobker was married to Kate Gene Russell and had two daughters, Gene Spieler, and Laurie Mahler and a son, Dr. Daniel Bobker; and seven grandchildren.

== Publications ==
- Lee R. Bobker, Elements of Film (1971)
- Lee R. Bobker, Making Movies: From Script to Screen (1973)
