= The Odds Against =

1966 film

- Directed by: Lee R. Bobker
- Produced by: Lee R. Bobker; Helen Kristt Radin
- Distributed by: American Foundation Institute of Corrections
- Release date: 1966
- Country: United States
- Language: English

The Odds Against is a 1966 American short documentary film directed by Lee R. Bobker. It was nominated for an Academy Award for Best Documentary Short.

== See also ==
- Psychiatric Nursing
- The Revolving Door
