= The Sand Pebbles (novel) =

Book by Richard McKenna

- Cover
- Author: Richard McKenna
- Language: English
- Publisher: Harper & Row
- Publication date: January 2, 1963
- Publication place: United States
- Media type: Print - hardcover
- Pages: 597

The Sand Pebbles is a 1962 novel by American author Richard McKenna about a Yangtze River gunboat and its crew in 1926. It was the winner of the 1963 Harper Prize for fiction. The book was initially serialized in The Saturday Evening Post, and was published in January 1963 by Harper & Row. In 1966 it was adapted into the same-named film starring Steve McQueen.

== Background ==
Richard McKenna served aboard a Yangtze River gunboat in 1936 but set the novel a decade earlier, during the Nationalist Northern Expedition of 1925–27, aboard the fictional USS San Pablo, a captured Spanish gunboat left over from the Spanish–American War. The phrase "sand pebble" is a pun on the boat's name; thus, the sailors who serve on her are the sand pebbles.

== Plot ==
The novel describes a life of boredom and sudden battle action, but the chief conflict is between the traditional western ideas, which saw China in racist and imperialist terms, and emerging nationalism. The protagonist, Machinist Mate First Class Jake Holman, the San Pablo's first assistant (PO3) engineer, teaches his Chinese workers—he refuses to call them "coolies"—to master the ship's machinery by understanding it, not just "monkey see, monkey do". The ship is sent to save the China Light Mission from anti-foreign mobs, setting off a debate: "No man who favors the unequal treaties has the right to call himself a Christian!" Others reply "It is time for the Society for Propagation of the Gospel to step aside. It is time for the Society for Propagation of Cannonballs to bring them to their senses." After the crew burn and destroy a war junk, Holman takes a landing party to rescue the missionaries, including teacher Shirley Eckert whom Jake has met several times and come to love. Holman is pinned down and killed, but Eckert is saved.

== Reception and review ==
It was serialized in The Saturday Evening Post for the three issues from November 17, 1962, through December 1, 1962. The author had completed it in May 1962, just in time to enter it in the 1963 Harper Prize Novel Contest. Not only was it picked over 544 other entries for the $10,000 first prize and accepted for publication by Harper & Row, but also it was chosen as the following January's Book-of-the-Month Club selection.

== References in popular culture ==
In the TV series For All Mankind, the character Ed Baldwin reads to his grandson Alex from The Sand Pebbles in the episode named "Legacy" (season 4 episode 8). Then in season 5 episode 4, Alex finds the book in Ed's stuff.

== Editions ==
- Richard McKenna, The Sand Pebbles: A Novel (New York: Harper & Row, 1962). Reprinted: Annapolis, Md.: Naval Institute Press, 2000. ISBN 1-55750-446-6.
