= John McCarthy Jr. =

American set decorator

- Born: June 1, 1912; California, USA
- Died: January 14, 1994 (aged 81); San Bernardino, California, USA
- Occupation: set decorator
- Years active: 1945-1980

John McCarthy Jr. (June 1, 1912 – January 14, 1994) was an American set decorator with an extensive filmography of over 300 films that began in 1945, when he dressed the set for Along the Navajo Trail.

Gaining experience on a seemingly endless succession of B-movies, his stock began to rise steadily in 1948 when he worked on Frank Borzage's Moonrise and Orson Welles' production of Macbeth. Assignments on Lewis Milestone's The Red Pony and Allan Dwan's Sands of Iwo Jima followed in 1949, films produced for Republic Pictures, with whom McCarthy was associated for many years. He was the recipient of an Oscar nomination in 1952 for John Ford's colourful The Quiet Man, the only Republic film to be so honoured.

By the mid-1950s and early 1960s, however, most of McCarthy's time was spent in television, where he worked on Alfred Hitchcock Presents, Wagon Train and The Munsters. Ironically, his television work led to better feature film assignments, all of them for Universal Pictures: Don Siegel's remake of The Killers (1964), the Doris Day comedy Send Me No Flowers (1964), the James Stewart Western Shenandoah (1965), Ronald Neame's caper movie Gambit (1966), for which he received a second Oscar nomination, the war epic Tobruk (1967), Coogan's Bluff (1968) and Robert Aldrich's acclaimed Ulzana's Raid (1972). Television still called him in the 1970s for programmes like Ironside and Columbo.
