= John P. Austin =

American set decorator

- Born: October 28, 1906; Anderson, Indiana, USA
- Died: May 10, 1997 (aged 90); Riverside, California, USA
- Occupation: Set decorator
- Years active: 1947–1979

John P. Austin (October 28, 1906 – May 10, 1997) was an American set decorator. He was nominated for an Academy Award in the category Best Art Direction for the film Gambit. He worked on more than 100 films between 1947 and 1979.

== Selected filmography ==
- Gambit (1966)
