= Richard McKenna =

American writer

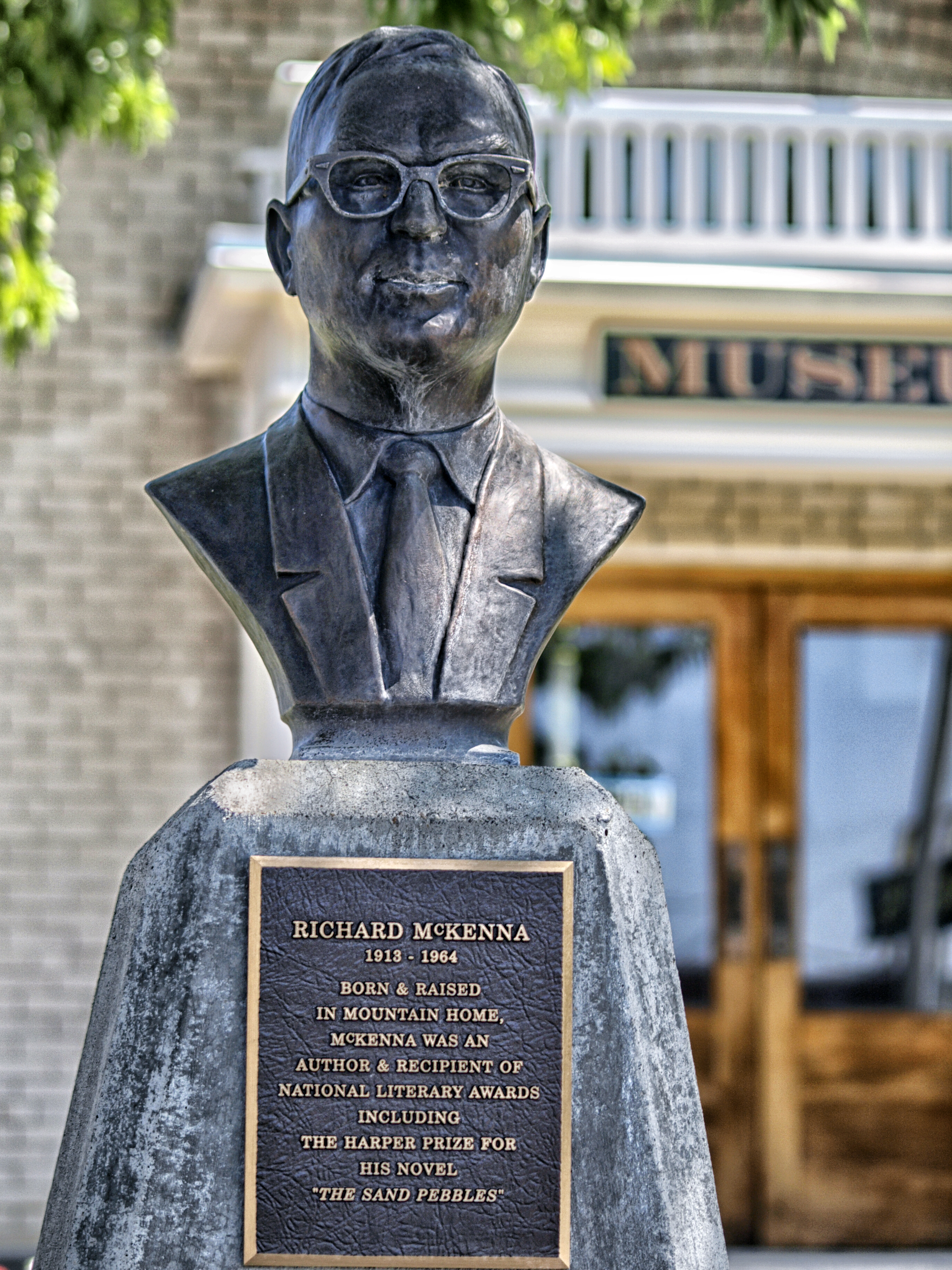
- Born: May 9, 1913; Mountain Home, Idaho, US
- Died: November 1, 1964 (aged 51); Chapel Hill, North Carolina, US
- Occupations: Sailor; writer
- Writing career
- Genres: Science fiction; historical fiction

Richard Milton McKenna (May 9, 1913 – November 1, 1964) was an American sailor and writer. In the late 1950s, he began writing science fiction stories, and is best known for his 1963 historical novel The Sand Pebbles, which tells the story of an American sailor serving aboard a gunboat on the Chinese Yangtze River in 1925.

== Biography ==
=== Early life ===
McKenna was born in Mountain Home, Idaho, on May 9, 1913.

Seeking more opportunities than could be found in such a rural part of the country at the height of the Great Depression, McKenna joined the U.S. Navy in 1931 at the age of 18. He served for 22 years, including 10 years of active sea duty. He served in World War II and the Korean War.

He retired as a Chief Machinist's Mate. Because of the benefits of the GI Bill, McKenna was able to attend college at the University of North Carolina at Chapel Hill, located in Chapel Hill, North Carolina, where he studied creative writing. He also married a librarian, Eva, whom he met at the college.

=== Writing career ===
McKenna began his writing career publishing science fiction, and starting in 1958 he regularly attended the annual Milford Writer's Workshop for science fiction writers. His first science fiction story "Casey Agonistes" immediately established him as a writer to be watched when it appeared in the September 1958 issue of The Magazine of Fantasy and Science Fiction. Only six of his science fiction tales were published during his lifetime, but six more were published posthumously.

McKenna's major work was The Sand Pebbles (1963), a 597-page novel later made into the well-known 1966 film of the same title. The protagonist was an enlisted career sailor on a U.S. Navy river gunboat named the San Pablo in China during the 1920s. McKenna himself served aboard a river gunboat on the Yangtze Patrol, but about ten years after the events in his novel and of more modern construction (San Pablo was an ancient gunboat seized from the Spanish in 1898). The Sand Pebbles won the $10,000 1963 Harper Prize Novel and was chosen as a Book-of-the-Month Club selection. On January 7, 1963, McKenna also appeared on the television quiz program To Tell the Truth.

=== Death and legacy ===
McKenna died of a heart attack at his Chapel Hill N.C. home on November 4, 1964, at age 51.

McKenna's posthumously published short story "The Secret Place" won the Nebula Award for Best Short Story in 1966 and was nominated for the Hugo Award for Best Short Story in 1967. Casey Agonistes and Other Science Fiction and Fantasy Stories (1973) collects the title story and four other short works: "Hunter, Come Home", "The Secret Place", "Mine Own Ways", and "Fiddler's Green". The Sons of Martha and Other Stories (which includes material intended for his second novel) and The Left-Handed Monkey Wrench: Stories and Essays were also published posthumously.

In 1966, The Sand Pebbles was adapted as a film of the same name starring Steve McQueen and Candice Bergen.

His childhood school in Mountain Home was renamed the Richard M. McKenna High School in 1999.

In 2015, a biography by Dennis L. Noble, The Sailor's Homer: The Life and Times of Richard McKenna, was published by Naval Institute Press.

== Bibliography ==
=== Books ===
- The Sand Pebbles (Harper & Row, 1963)
- The Sons of Martha and Other Stories (Harper & Row, 1967)
- New Eyes for Old: Nonfiction Writings, ed. Eva Grice McKenna and Shirley Graves Cochrane (J.F. Blair, 1972)
- Casey Agonistes and Other Science Fiction and Fantasy Stories (Harper & Row, 1973)
- The Left-Handed Monkey Wrench: Stories and Essays (Naval Institute Press, 1984)

=== Stories in magazines and anthologies ===
- "Casey Agonistes", Magazine of Fantasy and Science Fiction (September 1958)
- "The Fishdollar Affair", If (October 1958)
- "The Night of Hoggy Darn", If (December 1958)
- "Love and Moondogs", If (February 1959)
- "Mine Own Ways", Magazine of Fantasy and Science Fiction (February 1960)
- "Hunter, Come Home", Magazine of Fantasy and Science Fiction (March 1963)
- "The Secret Place", in Orbit 1, ed. Damon Knight (Putnam, 1966)
- "Fiddler's Green", in Orbit 2, ed. Damon Knight (Putnam, 1967)
- "Home the Hard Way", Magazine of Fantasy and Science Fiction (October 1967)
- "Bramble Bush", in Orbit 3, ed. Damon Knight (Putnam, 1968)
- "They Are Not Robbed", Magazine of Fantasy and Science Fiction (January 1968)
- "Unclear Call for Lee", in A Pocketful of Stars, ed. Damon Knight (1971)
