= A Mule for the Marquesa =

1964 novel by Frank O'Rourke

- First edition
- Author: Frank O'Rourke
- Language: English
- Genre: Western
- Publisher: William Morrow & Company
- Publication date: 1964
- Publication place: United States
- Media type: Print (Paperback)

A Mule for the Marquesa (1964) is a novel by Frank O'Rourke. The film The Professionals (1966) is based on it. After the release of the film, new editions of the novel were issued under the title The Professionals.
