= List of actors with Academy Award nominations =

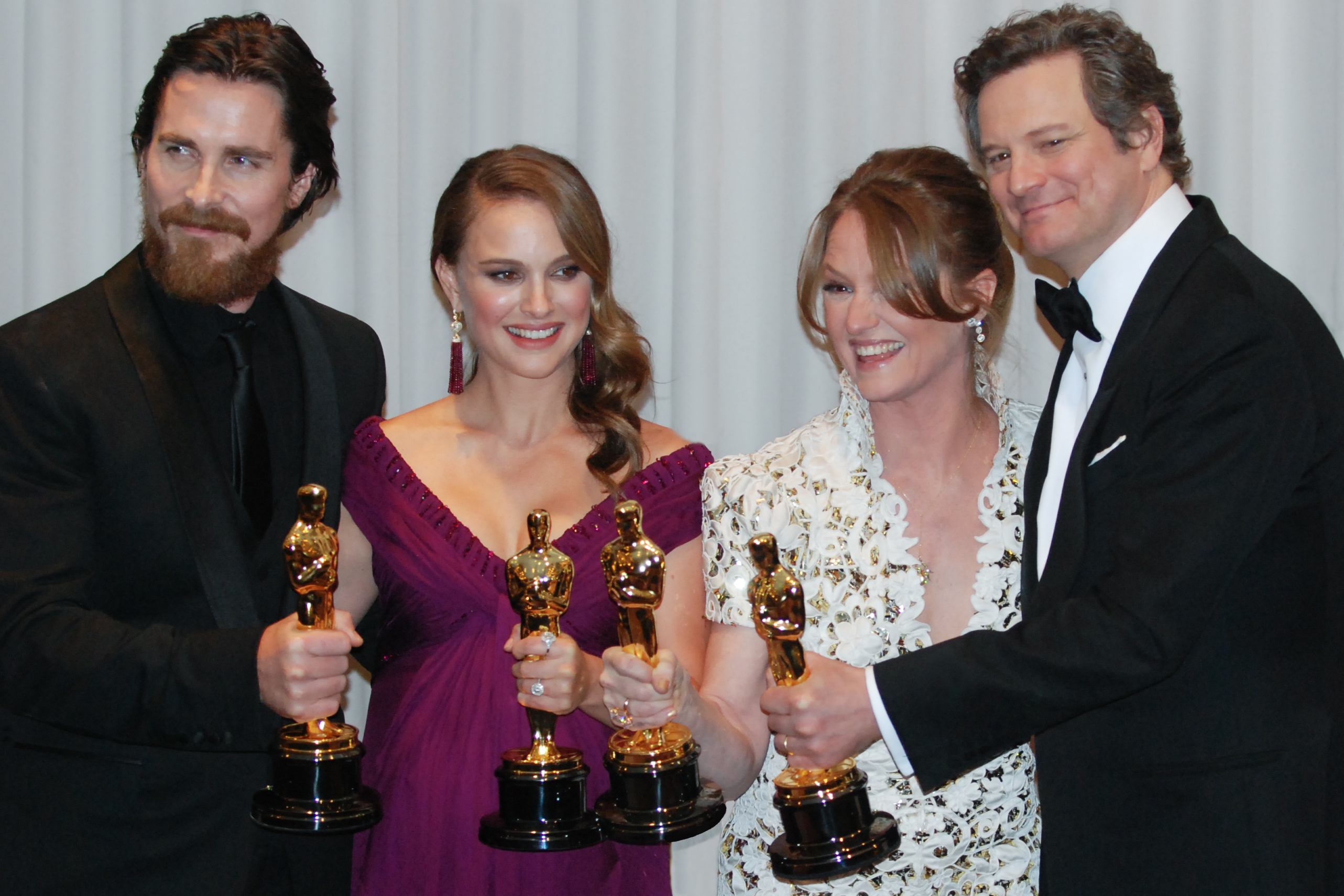
Academy Award winners for 2011 (from left to right): Christian Bale, Best Supporting Actor—The Fighter; Natalie Portman, Best Actress—Black Swan; Melissa Leo, Best Supporting Actress—The Fighter; Colin Firth, Best Actor—The King's Speech; with trophies known as Oscars

This list of actors with Academy Award nominations includes all male and female actors with Academy Award nominations for lead and supporting roles in motion pictures, and the total nominations and wins for each actor. Nominations in non-acting categories—such as for producing, directing, or writing—and Honorary Oscars are not included.

The most recent winners of all four acting categories, as of the 98th Academy Awards, are Michael B. Jordan for Sinners, Jessie Buckley for Hamnet, Sean Penn for One Battle After Another, and Amy Madigan for Weapons.

The award information is available on the Academy Awards website via dynamically generated lists for specific actors, and for each year's nominees and winners via a scrolling timeline of all ceremonies.

== Statistics ==
A total of 1,004 actors appear in the list—504 men and 500 women. Non-winning nominees include 343 men and 338 women—a total of 681. Actors who have won at least once include 161 men and 162 women—a total of 323. Only 46 actors—24 men and 22 women—are multiple Academy Award winners.

Katharine Hepburn won four times from twelve nominations—all for lead roles—making her the actor with the most wins in Academy Awards history. Daniel Day-Lewis has won three times from six lead actor nominations—the most wins for any male actor in the lead category. Frances McDormand has won three times for her lead roles, out of six nominations—three lead and three supporting.

Meryl Streep is the most-nominated actor of all, with twenty-one nominations. Jack Nicholson has received the most Academy Award nominations for any male actor, with twelve nominations. Both actors have had three wins which included two for lead roles and one for a supporting role. Ingrid Bergman, Sean Penn, and Walter Brennan also won three awards each, with Bergman and Penn winning twice for lead roles and once for a supporting role, out of seven total nominations for the former and six total nominations for the latter, and Brennan winning three times from four nominations, all in the supporting actor category.

== Table key ==
§ – a winning actor who refused an award

Born	Birth year – * indicates an uncertain birth year; see actor's article
Age	Current age for living actors, or age at death
Nominations	The total nominations for lead and supporting roles
Wins	The total wins for lead and supporting roles
Lead and supporting details	examples below
L	All nominations were for Lead roles
S	All nominations were for Supporting roles
2L:1S	2 Lead nominations, 1 Supporting nomination - no wins
5L1:2S1	5 Lead nominations with 1 win, 2 Supporting nominations with 1 win
Film	First winning film role, else first nominated film role, with lead roles taking precedence
First year	Year of first nomination (if italicized, it is the year of the listed film)
Last year	Year of last nomination (if italicized, it is the year of the listed film)

An italicized First or Last year indicates the listed film's year of release when it is the first or most recent nomination of an actor with multiple nominations.

== List of actors ==
The list is designed to be sortable by clicking on any of the column headings; however, sorting is only possible if JavaScript is enabled in your web browser. If viewing on a mobile device, switch to the desktop view to enable sorting by clicking on the word Desktop at the bottom of the page. The initial sort order is by actor surnames.

Actor		Born	Died	Age	Nomina- tions	Wins	Lead and sup- porting details	First winning film role or first nomination (also see list of all nominated roles)	First year	Last year
Barkhad Abdi	M	1985	~	41	1	0	S	Captain Phillips	2013	2013
F. Murray Abraham	M	1939	~	87	1	1	L	Amadeus	1984	1984
Amy Adams	F	1974	~	52	6	0	1L:5S	American Hustle	2005	2018
Nick Adams	M	1931	1968	36	1	0	S	Twilight of Honor	1963	1963
Isabelle Adjani	F	1955	~	71	2	0	L	The Story of Adele H.	1975	1989
Casey Affleck	M	1975	~	51	2	1	1L1:1S0	Manchester by the Sea	2007	2016
Shohreh Aghdashloo	F	1952	~	74	1	0	S	House of Sand and Fog	2003	2003
Brian Aherne	M	1902	1986	83	1	0	S	Juarez	1939	1939
Riz Ahmed	M	1982	~	43	1	0	L	Sound of Metal	2020	2020
Danny Aiello	M	1933	2019	86	1	0	S	Do the Right Thing	1989	1989
Anouk Aimée	F	1932	2024	92	1	0	L	A Man and a Woman	1966	1966
Eddie Albert	M	1906	2005	99	2	0	S	Roman Holiday	1953	1972
Jack Albertson	M	1907	1981	74	1	1	S	The Subject Was Roses	1968	1968
Alan Alda	M	1936	~	90	1	0	S	The Aviator	2004	2004
Norma Aleandro	F	1936	~	90	1	0	S	Gaby: A True Story	1987	1987
Jane Alexander	F	1939	~	87	4	0	2L:2S	The Great White Hope	1970	1983
Mahershala Ali	M	1974	~	52	2	2	S	Moonlight (Note: Mahershala Ali also won Best Supporting Actor for Green Book (2018).)	2016	2018
Joan Allen	F	1956	~	70	3	0	1L:2S	The Contender	1995	2000
Woody Allen	M	1935	~	90	1	0	L	Annie Hall	1977	1977
Sara Allgood	F	1880	1950	69	1	0	S	How Green Was My Valley	1941	1941
Don Ameche	M	1908	1993	85	1	1	S	Cocoon	1985	1985
Judith Anderson	F	1897	1992	94	1	0	S	Rebecca	1940	1940
Julie Andrews	F	1935	~	91	3	1	L	Mary Poppins	1964	1982
Ann-Margret	F	1941	~	85	2	0	1L:1S	Tommy	1971	1975
Yalitza Aparicio	F	1993	~	32	1	0	L	Roma	2018	2018
Anne Archer	F	1947	~	79	1	0	S	Fatal Attraction	1987	1987
Eve Arden	F	1908	1990	82	1	0	S	Mildred Pierce	1945	1945
Alan Arkin	M	1934	2023	89	4	1	2L0:2S1	Little Miss Sunshine	1966	2012
George Arliss	M	1868	1946	77	1 (Note: Rules at the time of the first three Academy Awards ceremonies allowed for a performer to receive a single nomination for their work in more than one film. At the 1st ceremony, Emil Jannings won Best Actor for his work in two films and Janet Gaynor won Best Actress for her work in three films. Richard Barthelmess also received a nomination for two films at the 1st ceremony. At the 3rd ceremony, George Arliss, Maurice Chevalier, Ronald Colman, Greta Garbo, and Norma Shearer all received a single nomination for their work in two films. No official reason was ever given as to why Arliss and Shearer were named Best Actor and Best Actress for only one of the two films for which they were listed.)	1	L	Disraeli	1929	1929
Patricia Arquette	F	1968	~	58	1	1	S	Boyhood	2014	2014
Jean Arthur	F	1900	1991	90	1	0	L	The More the Merrier	1943	1943
Peggy Ashcroft	F	1907	1991	83	1	1	S	A Passage to India	1984	1984
Fred Astaire	M	1899	1987	88	1	0	S	The Towering Inferno	1974	1974
Mary Astor	F	1906	1987	81	1	1	S	The Great Lie	1941	1941
Mischa Auer	M	1905	1967	61	1	0	S	My Man Godfrey	1936	1936
Margaret Avery	F	1944 *	~	82	1	0	S	The Color Purple	1985	1985
Dan Aykroyd	M	1952	~	74	1	0	S	Driving Miss Daisy	1989	1989
Lew Ayres	M	1908	1996	88	1	0	L	Johnny Belinda	1948	1948
Lauren Bacall	F	1924	2014	89	1	0	S	The Mirror Has Two Faces	1996	1996
Hermione Baddeley	F	1906	1986	79	1	0	S	Room at the Top	1959	1959
Mary Badham	F	1952	~	74	1	0	S	To Kill a Mockingbird	1962	1962
Fay Bainter	F	1893	1968	74	3	1	1L0:2S1	Jezebel (Note: Fay Bainter was nominated for two awards at the 1939 ceremony: Best Actress for White Banners (1938) and Best Supporting Actress for Jezebel (1938), winning in the supporting actress category.)	1938	1961
Maria Bakalova	F	1996	~	30	1	0	S	Borat Subsequent Moviefilm	2020	2020
Carroll Baker	F	1931	~	95	1	0	L	Baby Doll	1956	1956
Alec Baldwin	M	1958	~	68	1	0	S	The Cooler	2003	2003
Christian Bale	M	1974	~	52	4	1	2L0:2S1	The Fighter	2010	2018
Martin Balsam	M	1919	1996	76	1	1	S	A Thousand Clowns	1965	1965
Anne Bancroft	F	1931	2005	73	5	1	L	The Miracle Worker	1962	1985
George Bancroft	M	1882	1956	74	1 (Note: There was no announcement of nominations for the 2nd Academy Awards ceremony, only the winners were announced. Further research by the Academy resulted in a de facto list of nominees, using records of the films that the judges had given their opinions on.)	0	L	Thunderbolt	1929	1929
Antonio Banderas	M	1960	~	66	1	0	L	Pain and Glory	2019	2019
Ian Bannen	M	1928	1999	71	1	0	S	The Flight of the Phoenix	1965	1965
Monica Barbaro	F	1990	~	36	1	0	S	A Complete Unknown	2024	2024
Javier Bardem	M	1969	~	57	4	1	3L0:1S1	No Country for Old Men	2000	2021
Sacha Baron Cohen	M	1971	~	55	1	0	S	The Trial of the Chicago 7	2020	2020
Marie-Christine Barrault	F	1944	~	82	1	0	L	Cousin Cousine	1976	1976
Adriana Barraza	F	1956	~	70	1	0	S	Babel	2006	2006
Barbara Barrie	F	1931	2026	95	1	0	S	Breaking Away	1979	1979
Ethel Barrymore	F	1879	1959	79	4	1	S	None but the Lonely Heart	1944	1949
Lionel Barrymore	M	1878	1954	76	1	1	L	A Free Soul	1931	1931
Richard Barthelmess	M	1895	1963	68	1	0	L	The Patent Leather Kid	1927	1927
Mikhail Baryshnikov	M	1948	~	78	1	0	S	The Turning Point	1977	1977
Kim Basinger	F	1953	~	72	1	1	S	L.A. Confidential	1997	1997
Albert Bassermann	M	1867	1952	84	1	0	S	Foreign Correspondent	1940	1940
Angela Bassett	F	1958	~	68	2	0	1L:1S	What's Love Got to Do with It	1993	2022
Alan Bates	M	1934	2003	69	1	0	L	The Fixer	1968	1968
Kathy Bates	F	1948	~	78	4	1	1L1:3S0	Misery	1990	2019
Anne Baxter	F	1923	1985	62	2	1	1L0:1S1	The Razor's Edge	1946	1950
Warner Baxter	M	1889	1951	62	1	1	L	In Old Arizona	1928	1928
Ned Beatty	M	1937	2021	83	1	0	S	Network	1976	1976
Warren Beatty	M	1937	~	89	4	0	L	Bonnie and Clyde	1967	1991
Wallace Beery	M	1885	1949	64	2	1	L	The Champ	1930	1931
Ed Begley	M	1901	1970	69	1	1	S	Sweet Bird of Youth	1962	1962
Bérénice Bejo	F	1976	~	50	1	0	S	The Artist	2011	2011
Barbara Bel Geddes	F	1922	2005	82	1	0	S	I Remember Mama	1948	1948
Ralph Bellamy	M	1904	1991	87	1	0	S	The Awful Truth	1937	1937
William Bendix	M	1906	1964	58	1	0	S	Wake Island	1942	1942
Roberto Benigni	M	1952	~	74	1	1	L	Life Is Beautiful	1998	1998
Annette Bening	F	1958	~	68	5	0	4L:1S	American Beauty	1990	2023
Tom Berenger	M	1949	~	77	1	0	S	Platoon	1986	1986
Candice Bergen	F	1946	~	80	1	0	S	Starting Over	1979	1979
Ingrid Bergman	F	1915	1982	67	7	3	6L2:1S1	Gaslight (Note: Ingrid Bergman also won Best Actress for Anastasia (1956) and Best Supporting Actress for Murder on the Orient Express (1974).)	1943	1978
Elisabeth Bergner	F	1897	1986	88	1	0	L	Escape Me Never	1935	1935
Jeannie Berlin	F	1949	~	77	1	0	S	The Heartbreak Kid	1972	1972
Halle Berry	F	1966	~	60	1	1	L	Monster's Ball	2001	2001
Demián Bichir	M	1963	~	63	1	0	L	A Better Life	2011	2011
Charles Bickford	M	1891	1967	76	3	0	S	The Song of Bernadette	1943	1948
Theodore Bikel	M	1924	2015	91	1	0	S	The Defiant Ones	1958	1958
Juliette Binoche	F	1964	~	62	2	1	1L0:1S1	The English Patient	1996	2000
Karen Black	F	1939	2013	74	1	0	S	Five Easy Pieces	1970	1970
Betsy Blair	F	1923	2009	85	1	0	S	Marty	1955	1955
Linda Blair	F	1959	~	67	1	0	S	The Exorcist	1973	1973
Ronee Blakley	F	1945	~	81	1	0	S	Nashville	1975	1975
Cate Blanchett	F	1969	~	57	8	2	5L1:3S1	Blue Jasmine (Note: Cate Blanchett also won Best Supporting Actress for The Aviator (2004).) (Note: Cate Blanchett was nominated for two awards at the 2008 ceremony: Best Actress for Elizabeth: The Golden Age (2007) and Best Supporting Actress for I'm Not There (2007), winning in neither category.)	1998	2022
Brenda Blethyn	F	1946	~	80	2	0	1L:1S	Secrets & Lies	1996	1998
Mary J. Blige	F	1971	~	55	1	0	S	Mudbound	2017	2017
Joan Blondell	F	1906	1979	73	1	0	S	The Blue Veil	1951	1951
Emily Blunt	F	1983	~	43	1	0	S	Oppenheimer	2023	2023
Ann Blyth	F	1927	2026	98	1	0	S	Mildred Pierce	1945	1945
Humphrey Bogart	M	1899	1957	57	3	1	L	The African Queen	1943	1954
Beulah Bondi	F	1888	1981	92	2	0	S	The Gorgeous Hussy	1936	1938
Helena Bonham Carter	F	1966	~	60	2	0	1L:1S	The Wings of the Dove	1997	2010
Shirley Booth	F	1898	1992	94	1	1	L	Come Back, Little Sheba	1952	1952
Ernest Borgnine	M	1917	2012	95	1	1	L	Marty	1955	1955
Yura Borisov	M	1992	~	33	1	0	S	Anora	2024	2024
Chadwick Boseman	M	1976	2020	43	1	0	L	Ma Rainey's Black Bottom	2020	2020
Charles Boyer	M	1899	1978	78	4	0	L	Conquest	1937	1961
Lorraine Bracco	F	1954	~	72	1	0	S	Goodfellas	1990	1990
Alice Brady	F	1892	1939	46	2	1	S	In Old Chicago	1936	1937
Kenneth Branagh	M	1960	~	65	2	0	1L:1S	Henry V	1989	2011
Klaus Maria Brandauer	M	1943	~	83	1	0	S	Out of Africa	1985	1985
Marlon Brando §	M	1924	2004	80	8	2 (Note: Marlon Brando accepted the award for On the Waterfront (1954) but refused the award for The Godfather (1972).)	7L2:1S0	On the Waterfront (Note: Marlon Brando also won Best Actor for The Godfather (1972) but refused the award that year.)	1951	1989
Eileen Brennan	F	1932	2013	80	1	0	S	Private Benjamin	1980	1980
Walter Brennan	M	1894	1974	80	4	3	S	Come and Get It (Note: Walter Brennan also won Best Supporting Actor for Kentucky (1938) and The Westerner (1940).)	1936	1941
Abigail Breslin	F	1996	~	30	1	0	S	Little Miss Sunshine	2006	2006
Jeff Bridges	M	1949	~	76	7	1	3L1:4S0	Crazy Heart	1971	2016
Jim Broadbent	M	1949	~	77	1	1	S	Iris	2001	2001
Adrien Brody	M	1973	~	53	2	2	L	The Pianist (Note: Adrien Brody also won Best Actor for The Brutalist (2024).)	2002	2024
Josh Brolin	M	1968	~	58	1	0	S	Milk	2008	2008
Albert Brooks	M	1947	~	79	1	0	S	Broadcast News	1987	1987
Danielle Brooks	F	1989	~	37	1	0	S	The Color Purple	2023	2023
Sterling K. Brown	M	1976	~	50	1	0	S	American Fiction	2023	2023
Leslie Browne	F	1957	~	69	1	0	S	The Turning Point	1977	1977
Yul Brynner	M	1920	1985	65	1	1	L	The King and I	1956	1956
Jessie Buckley	F	1989	~	36	2	1	1L1:1S0	Hamnet	2021	2025
Geneviève Bujold	F	1942	~	84	1	0	L	Anne of the Thousand Days	1969	1969
Sandra Bullock	F	1964	~	62	2	1	L	The Blind Side	2009	2013
Victor Buono	M	1938	1982	43	1	0	S	What Ever Happened to Baby Jane?	1962	1962
Billie Burke	F	1884	1970	85	1	0	S	Merrily We Live	1938	1938
Catherine Burns	F	1945	2019	73	1	0	S	Last Summer	1969	1969
George Burns	M	1896	1996	100	1	1	S	The Sunshine Boys	1975	1975
Ellen Burstyn	F	1932	~	93	6	1	5L1:1S0	Alice Doesn't Live Here Anymore	1971	2000
Richard Burton	M	1925	1984	58	7	0	6L:1S	The Robe	1952	1977
Gary Busey	M	1944	~	82	1	0	L	The Buddy Holly Story	1978	1978
Austin Butler	M	1991	~	35	1	0	L	Elvis	2022	2022
Red Buttons	M	1919	2006	87	1	1	S	Sayonara	1957	1957
Spring Byington	F	1886	1971	84	1	0	S	You Can't Take It with You	1938	1938
Rose Byrne	F	1979	~	47	1	0	L	If I Had Legs I'd Kick You	2025	2025
James Caan	M	1940	2022	82	1	0	S	The Godfather	1972	1972
Adolph Caesar	M	1933	1986	52	1	0	S	A Soldier's Story	1984	1984
Nicolas Cage	M	1964	~	62	2	1	L	Leaving Las Vegas	1995	2002
James Cagney	M	1899	1986	86	3	1	L	Yankee Doodle Dandy	1938	1955
Michael Caine	M	1933	~	93	6	2	4L0:2S2	Hannah and Her Sisters (Note: Michael Caine also won Best Supporting Actor for The Cider House Rules (1999).)	1966	2002
Louis Calhern	M	1895	1956	61	1	0	L	The Magnificent Yankee	1950	1950
Dyan Cannon	F	1937	~	89	2	0	S	Bob & Carol & Ted & Alice	1969	1978
Steve Carell	M	1962	~	64	1	0	L	Foxcatcher	2014	2014
Harry Carey	M	1878	1947	69	1	0	S	Mr. Smith Goes to Washington	1939	1939
Lynn Carlin	F	1938	~	88	1	0	S	Faces	1968	1968
Art Carney	M	1918	2003	85	1	1	L	Harry and Tonto	1974	1974
Leslie Caron	F	1931	~	95	2	0	L	Lili	1953	1963
Diahann Carroll	F	1935	2019	84	1	0	L	Claudine	1974	1974
Nancy Carroll	F	1903	1965	61	1	0	L	The Devil's Holiday	1930	1930
Peggy Cass	F	1924	1999	74	1	0	S	Auntie Mame	1958	1958
John Cassavetes	M	1929	1989	59	1	0	S	The Dirty Dozen	1967	1967
Seymour Cassel	M	1935	2019	84	1	0	S	Faces	1968	1968
Richard S. Castellano	M	1933	1988	55	1	0	S	Lovers and Other Strangers	1970	1970
Keisha Castle-Hughes	F	1990	~	36	1	0	L	Whale Rider	2003	2003
George Chakiris	M	1932	~	94	1	1	S	West Side Story	1961	1961
Timothée Chalamet	M	1995	~	30	3	0	L	Call Me by Your Name	2017	2025
Jeff Chandler	M	1918	1961	42	1	0	S	Broken Arrow	1950	1950
Carol Channing	F	1921	2019	97	1	0	S	Thoroughly Modern Millie	1967	1967
Stockard Channing	F	1944	~	82	1	0	L	Six Degrees of Separation	1993	1993
Charlie Chaplin	M	1889	1977	88	1 (Note: At the 1st Academy Awards ceremony, Charlie Chaplin originally received three nominations (including Best Actor) for his film The Circus, before the Academy decided to remove his name from the competitive categories and instead honor him with a Special Award "for acting, writing, directing and producing The Circus".)	0	L	The Great Dictator	1940	1940
Jessica Chastain	F	1977	~	49	3	1	2L1:1S0	The Eyes of Tammy Faye	2011	2021
Ruth Chatterton	F	1892	1961	68	2	0	L	Madame X	1929	1930
Hong Chau	F	1979	~	47	1	0	S	The Whale	2022	2022
Don Cheadle	M	1964	~	61	1	0	L	Hotel Rwanda	2004	2004
Michael Chekhov	M	1891	1955	64	1	0	S	Spellbound	1945	1945
Cher	F	1946	~	80	2	1	1L1:1S0	Moonstruck	1983	1987
Maurice Chevalier	M	1888	1972	83	1	0	L	The Love Parade	1929	1929
Julie Christie	F	1940	~	86	4	1	L	Darling	1965	2007
Thomas Haden Church	M	1960	~	66	1	0	S	Sideways	2004	2004
Diane Cilento	F	1933	2011	78	1	0	S	Tom Jones	1963	1963
Candy Clark	F	1947	~	79	1	0	S	American Graffiti	1973	1973
Patricia Clarkson	F	1959	~	66	1	0	S	Pieces of April	2003	2003
Jill Clayburgh	F	1944	2010	66	2	0	L	An Unmarried Woman	1978	1979
Montgomery Clift	M	1920	1966	45	4	0	3L:1S	The Search	1948	1961
George Clooney	M	1961	~	65	4	1	3L0:1S1	Syriana	2005	2011
Glenn Close	F	1947	~	79	8	0	4L:4S	Fatal Attraction	1982	2020
Lee J. Cobb	M	1911	1976	64	2	0	S	On the Waterfront	1954	1958
Charles Coburn	M	1877	1961	84	3	1	S	The More the Merrier	1941	1946
James Coburn	M	1928	2002	74	1	1	S	Affliction	1998	1998
James Coco	M	1930	1987	56	1	0	S	Only When I Laugh	1981	1981
Claudette Colbert	F	1903	1996	92	3	1	L	It Happened One Night	1934	1944
Toni Collette	F	1972	~	54	1	0	S	The Sixth Sense	1999	1999
Patricia Collinge	F	1892	1974	81	1	0	S	The Little Foxes	1941	1941
Pauline Collins	F	1940	2025	85	1	0	L	Shirley Valentine	1989	1989
Olivia Colman	F	1974	~	52	3	1	2L1:1S0	The Favourite	2018	2021
Ronald Colman	M	1891	1958	67	3	1	L	A Double Life	1929	1947
Betty Compson	F	1897	1974	77	1	0	L	The Barker	1928	1928
Kerry Condon	F	1983	~	43	1	0	S	The Banshees of Inisherin	2022	2022
Jennifer Connelly	F	1970	~	55	1	1	S	A Beautiful Mind	2001	2001
Sean Connery	M	1930	2020	90	1	1	S	The Untouchables	1987	1987
Tom Conti	M	1941	~	84	1	0	L	Reuben, Reuben	1983	1983
Bradley Cooper	M	1975	~	51	5	0	4L:1S	Silver Linings Playbook	2012	2023
Chris Cooper	M	1951	~	75	1	1	S	Adaptation	2002	2002
Gary Cooper	M	1901	1961	60	5	2	L	Sergeant York (Note: Gary Cooper also won Best Actor for High Noon (1952).)	1936	1952
Gladys Cooper	F	1888	1971	82	3	0	S	Now, Voyager	1942	1964
Jackie Cooper	M	1922	2011	88	1	0	L	Skippy	1931	1931
Ellen Corby	F	1911	1999	87	1	0	S	I Remember Mama	1948	1948
Valentina Cortese	F	1923	2019	96	1	0	S	Day for Night	1974	1974
Kevin Costner	M	1955	~	71	1	0	L	Dances With Wolves	1990	1990
Marion Cotillard	F	1975	~	51	2	1	L	La Vie en Rose	2007	2014
Tom Courtenay	M	1937	~	89	2	0	1L:1S	The Dresser	1965	1983
Jeanne Crain	F	1925	2003	78	1	0	L	Pinky	1949	1949
Bryan Cranston	M	1956	~	70	1	0	L	Trumbo	2015	2015
Broderick Crawford	M	1911	1986	74	1	1	L	All the King's Men	1949	1949
Joan Crawford	F	1905 *	1977	72	3	1	L	Mildred Pierce	1945	1952
Donald Crisp	M	1882	1974	91	1	1	S	How Green Was My Valley	1941	1941
James Cromwell	M	1940	~	86	1	0	S	Babe	1995	1995
Hume Cronyn	M	1911	2003	91	1	0	S	The Seventh Cross	1944	1944
Bing Crosby	M	1903	1977	74	3	1	L	Going My Way	1944	1954
Rupert Crosse	M	1927	1973	45	1	0	S	The Reivers	1969	1969
Lindsay Crouse	F	1948	~	78	1	0	S	Places in the Heart	1984	1984
Russell Crowe	M	1964	~	62	3	1	L	Gladiator	1999	2001
Tom Cruise	M	1962	~	64	3	0	2L:1S	Born on the Fourth of July	1989	1999
Penélope Cruz	F	1974	~	52	4	1	2L0:2S1	Vicky Cristina Barcelona	2006	2021
Kieran Culkin	M	1982	~	44	1	1	S	A Real Pain	2024	2024
Benedict Cumberbatch	M	1976	~	50	2	0	L	The Imitation Game	2014	2021
Quinn Cummings	F	1967	~	59	1	0	S	The Goodbye Girl	1977	1977
Jamie Lee Curtis	F	1958	~	67	1	1	S	Everything Everywhere All at Once	2022	2022
Tony Curtis	M	1925	2010	85	1	0	L	The Defiant Ones	1958	1958
Joan Cusack	F	1962	~	64	2	0	S	Working Girl	1988	1997
Willem Dafoe	M	1955	~	71	4	0	1L:3S	At Eternity's Gate	1986	2018
Dan Dailey	M	1915	1978	62	1	0	L	When My Baby Smiles at Me	1948	1948
John Dall	M	1920	1971	50	1	0	S	The Corn Is Green	1945	1945
Matt Damon	M	1970	~	56	3	0	2L:1S	Good Will Hunting	1997	2015
Dorothy Dandridge	F	1922	1965	42	1	0	L	Carmen Jones	1954	1954
Bobby Darin	M	1936	1973	37	1	0	S	Captain Newman, M.D.	1963	1963
Jane Darwell	F	1879	1967	87	1	1	S	The Grapes of Wrath	1940	1940
Jaye Davidson	M	1968 *	~	58	1	0	S	The Crying Game	1992	1992
Bette Davis	F	1908	1989	81	11 (Note: Counts include Bette Davis's performance in Of Human Bondage (1934) and Paul Muni's performance in Black Fury (1935) which were not properly nominated for an Oscar. For two years only, the Academy allowed a write-in vote which meant that any performance was eligible for the award. Davis came in 3rd place at the 7th ceremony in 1935, while Muni came in 2nd place at the 8th ceremony in 1936; however, the Academy does not recognize either as official nominees for those years though both actors remain listed as nominees in the Academy's database.)	2	L	Dangerous (Note: Bette Davis also won Best Actress for Jezebel (1938).)	1934	1962
Geena Davis	F	1956	~	70	2	1	1L0:1S1	The Accidental Tourist	1988	1991
Judy Davis	F	1955	~	71	2	0	1L:1S	A Passage to India	1984	1992
Viola Davis	F	1965	~	61	4	1	2L0:2S1	Fences	2008	2020
Bruce Davison	M	1946	~	80	1	0	S	Longtime Companion	1990	1990
Andra Day	F	1984	~	41	1	0	L	The United States vs. Billie Holiday	2020	2020
Doris Day	F	1922	2019	97	1	0	L	Pillow Talk	1959	1959
Daniel Day-Lewis	M	1957	~	69	6	3	L	My Left Foot (Note: Daniel Day-Lewis also won Best Actor for There Will Be Blood (2007) and Lincoln (2012).)	1989	2017
Ana de Armas	F	1988	~	38	1	0	L	Blonde	2022	2022
Olivia de Havilland	F	1916	2020	104	5	2	4L2:1S0	To Each His Own (Note: Olivia de Havilland also won Best Actress for The Heiress (1949).)	1939	1949
Robert De Niro	M	1943	~	83	8	2	5L1:3S1	Raging Bull (Note: Robert De Niro also won Best Supporting Actor for The Godfather Part II (1974).)	1974	2023
Vittorio De Sica	M	1901	1974	73	1	0	S	A Farewell to Arms	1957	1957
Marina de Tavira	F	1974	~	51	1	0	S	Roma	2018	2018
James Dean	M	1931	1955	24	2	0	L	East of Eden	1955	1956
Ariana DeBose	F	1991	~	35	1	1	S	West Side Story	2021	2021
Ruby Dee	F	1922	2014	91	1	0	S	American Gangster	2007	2007
Benicio del Toro	M	1967	~	59	3	1	S	Traffic	2000	2025
William Demarest	M	1892	1983	91	1	0	S	The Jolson Story	1946	1946
Judi Dench	F	1934	~	91	8	1	5L0:3S1	Shakespeare in Love	1997	2021
Catherine Deneuve	F	1943	~	83	1	0	L	Indochine	1992	1992
Sandy Dennis	F	1937	1992	54	1	1	S	Who's Afraid of Virginia Woolf?	1966	1966
Gérard Depardieu	M	1948	~	77	1	0	L	Cyrano de Bergerac	1990	1990
Johnny Depp	M	1963	~	63	3	0	L	Pirates of the Caribbean: The Curse of the Black Pearl	2003	2007
Bruce Dern	M	1936	~	90	2	0	1L:1S	Nebraska	1978	2013
Laura Dern	F	1967	~	59	3	1	1L0:2S1	Marriage Story	1991	2019
Brandon deWilde	M	1942	1972	30	1	0	S	Shane	1953	1953
Leonardo DiCaprio	M	1974	~	52	7	1	6L1:1S0	The Revenant	1993	2025
Marlene Dietrich	F	1901	1992	90	1	0	L	Morocco	1930	1930
Matt Dillon	M	1964	~	62	1	0	S	Crash	2005	2005
Melinda Dillon	F	1939	2023	83	2	0	S	Close Encounters of the Third Kind	1977	1981
Richard Dix	M	1893	1949	56	1	0	L	Cimarron	1931	1931
Colman Domingo	M	1969	~	56	2	0	L	Rustin	2023	2024
Robert Donat	M	1905	1958	53	2	1	L	Goodbye, Mr. Chips	1938	1939
Brian Donlevy	M	1901	1972	71	1	0	S	Beau Geste	1939	1939
Kirk Douglas	M	1916	2020	103	3	0	L	Champion	1949	1956
Melvyn Douglas	M	1901	1981	80	3	2	1L0:2S2	Hud (Note: Melvyn Douglas also won Best Supporting Actor for Being There (1979).)	1963	1979
Michael Douglas	M	1944	~	82	1	1	L	Wall Street	1987	1987
Brad Dourif	M	1950	~	76	1	0	S	One Flew Over the Cuckoo's Nest	1975	1975
Robert Downey Jr.	M	1965	~	61	3	1	1L0:2S1	Oppenheimer	1992	2023
Louise Dresser	F	1878	1965	85	1	0	L	A Ship Comes In	1928	1928
Marie Dressler	F	1868	1934	65	2	1	L	Min and Bill	1930	1932
Richard Dreyfuss	M	1947	~	79	2	1	L	The Goodbye Girl	1977	1995
Adam Driver	M	1983	~	43	2	0	1L:1S	Marriage Story	2018	2019
Minnie Driver	F	1970	~	56	1	0	S	Good Will Hunting	1997	1997
Jean Dujardin	M	1972	~	54	1	1	L	The Artist	2011	2011
Olympia Dukakis	F	1931	2021	89	1	1	S	Moonstruck	1987	1987
Patty Duke	F	1946	2016	69	1	1	S	The Miracle Worker	1962	1962
Faye Dunaway	F	1941	~	85	3	1	L	Network	1967	1976
Michael Clarke Duncan	M	1957	2012	54	1	0	S	The Green Mile	1999	1999
James Dunn	M	1901	1967	65	1	1	S	A Tree Grows in Brooklyn	1945	1945
Michael Dunn	M	1934	1973	38	1	0	S	Ship of Fools	1965	1965
Irene Dunne	F	1898	1990	91	5	0	L	Cimarron	1931	1948
Mildred Dunnock	F	1901	1991	90	2	0	S	Death of a Salesman	1951	1956
Kirsten Dunst	F	1982	~	44	1	0	S	The Power of the Dog	2021	2021
Charles Durning	M	1923	2012	89	2	0	S	The Best Little Whorehouse in Texas	1982	1983
Robert Duvall	M	1931	2026	95	7	1	3L1:4S0	Tender Mercies	1972	2014
Jeanne Eagels	F	1890	1929	39	1	0	L	The Letter	1929	1929
Clint Eastwood	M	1930	~	96	2	0	L	Unforgiven	1992	2004
Samantha Eggar	F	1939	2025	86	1	0	L	The Collector	1965	1965
Jesse Eisenberg	M	1983	~	43	1	0	L	The Social Network	2010	2010
Chiwetel Ejiofor	M	1977	~	49	1	0	L	12 Years a Slave	2013	2013
Denholm Elliott	M	1922	1992	70	1	0	S	A Room with a View	1986	1986
Sam Elliott	M	1944	~	82	1	0	S	A Star Is Born	2018	2018
Aunjanue Ellis-Taylor	F	1969	~	57	1	0	S	King Richard	2021	2021
Jacob Elordi	M	1997	~	29	1	0	S	Frankenstein	2025	2025
Hope Emerson	F	1897	1960	62	1	0	S	Caged	1950	1950
Cynthia Erivo	F	1987	~	39	2	0	L	Harriet	2019	2024
Stuart Erwin	M	1903	1967	64	1	0	S	Pigskin Parade	1936	1936
Edith Evans	F	1888	1976	88	3	0	1L:2S	The Whisperers	1963	1967
Peter Falk	M	1927	2011	83	2	0	S	Murder, Inc.	1960	1961
Elle Fanning	F	1998	~	28	1	0	S	Sentimental Value	2025	2025
Vera Farmiga	F	1973	~	53	1	0	S	Up in the Air	2009	2009
Richard Farnsworth	M	1920	2000	80	2	0	1L:1S	The Straight Story	1978	1999
Colin Farrell	M	1976	~	50	1	0	L	The Banshees of Inisherin	2022	2022
Michael Fassbender	M	1977	~	49	2	0	1L:1S	Steve Jobs	2013	2015
José Ferrer	M	1912	1992	80	3	1	2L1:1S0	Cyrano de Bergerac	1948	1952
America Ferrera	F	1984	~	42	1	0	S	Barbie	2023	2023
Sally Field	F	1946	~	80	3	2	2L2:1S0	Norma Rae (Note: Sally Field also won Best Actress for Places in the Heart (1984).)	1979	2012
Ralph Fiennes	M	1962	~	63	3	0	2L:1S	The English Patient	1993	2024
Peter Finch	M	1916	1977	60	2	1	L	Network	1971	1976
Frank Finlay	M	1926	2016	89	1	0	S	Othello	1965	1965
Albert Finney	M	1936	2019	82	5	0	4L:1S	Tom Jones	1963	2000
Colin Firth	M	1960	~	66	2	1	L	The King's Speech	2009	2010
Peter Firth	M	1953	~	73	1	0	S	Equus	1977	1977
Laurence Fishburne	M	1961	~	65	1	0	L	What's Love Got to Do with It	1993	1993
Barry Fitzgerald	M	1888	1961	72	2	1	1L0:1S1	Going My Way (Note: Barry Fitzgerald was nominated for Best Actor and Best Supporting Actor at the 1945 ceremony for his role in Going My Way (1944), winning in the supporting actor category. A subsequent rule change prevents nominations in both categories for the same role.)	1944	1944
Geraldine Fitzgerald	F	1913	2005	91	1	0	S	Wuthering Heights	1939	1939
Louise Fletcher	F	1934	2022	88	1	1	L	One Flew Over the Cuckoo's Nest	1975	1975
Nina Foch	F	1924	2008	84	1	0	S	Executive Suite	1954	1954
Henry Fonda	M	1905	1982	77	2	1	L	On Golden Pond	1940	1981
Jane Fonda	F	1937	~	88	7	2	6L2:1S0	Klute (Note: Jane Fonda also won Best Actress for Coming Home (1978).)	1969	1986
Peter Fonda	M	1940	2019	79	1	0	L	Ulee's Gold	1997	1997
Joan Fontaine	F	1917	2013	96	3	1	L	Suspicion	1940	1943
Lynn Fontanne	F	1887	1983	95	1	0	L	The Guardsman	1931	1931
Harrison Ford	M	1942	~	84	1	0	L	Witness	1985	1985
Frederic Forrest	M	1936	2023	86	1	0	S	The Rose	1979	1979
Robert Forster	M	1941	2019	78	1	0	S	Jackie Brown	1997	1997
Jodie Foster	F	1962	~	64	5	2	3L2:2S0	The Accused (Note: Jodie Foster also won Best Actress for The Silence of the Lambs (1991).)	1976	2023
Jamie Foxx	M	1967	~	58	2	1	1L1:1S0	Ray (Note: Jamie Foxx was nominated for two awards at the 2005 ceremony: Best Actor for Ray (2004) and Best Supporting Actor for Collateral (2004), winning in the lead actor category.)	2004	2004
Anthony Franciosa	M	1928	2006	77	1	0	L	A Hatful of Rain	1957	1957
James Franco	M	1978	~	48	1	0	L	127 Hours	2010	2010
Brendan Fraser	M	1968	~	57	1	1	L	The Whale	2022	2022
Morgan Freeman	M	1937	~	89	5	1	3L0:2S1	Million Dollar Baby	1987	2009
Leonard Frey	M	1938	1988	49	1	0	S	Fiddler on the Roof	1971	1971
Brenda Fricker	F	1945	2026	81	1	1	S	My Left Foot	1989	1989
Clark Gable	M	1901	1960	59	3	1	L	It Happened One Night	1934	1939
Lady Gaga	F	1986	~	40	1	0	L	A Star Is Born	2018	2018
Greta Garbo	F	1905	1990	84	3	0	L	Anna Christie	1930	1939
Andy García	M	1956	~	70	1	0	S	The Godfather Part III	1990	1990
Vincent Gardenia	M	1920	1992	72	2	0	S	Bang the Drum Slowly	1973	1987
Ava Gardner	F	1922	1990	67	1	0	L	Mogambo	1953	1953
Andrew Garfield	M	1983	~	43	2	0	L	Hacksaw Ridge	2016	2021
John Garfield	M	1913	1952	39	2	0	1L:1S	Body and Soul	1938	1947
William Gargan	M	1905	1979	73	1	0	S	They Knew What They Wanted	1940	1940
Judy Garland	F	1922	1969	47	2	0	1L:1S	A Star Is Born	1954	1961
James Garner	M	1928	2014	86	1	0	L	Murphy's Romance	1985	1985
Teri Garr	F	1944	2024	79	1	0	S	Tootsie	1982	1982
Greer Garson	F	1904	1996	91	7	1	L	Mrs. Miniver	1939	1960
Karla Sofía Gascón	F	1972	~	54	1	0	L	Emilia Pérez	2024	2024
Janet Gaynor	F	1906	1984	77	2	1	L	7th Heaven	1927	1937
Michael V. Gazzo	M	1923	1995	71	1	0	S	The Godfather Part II	1974	1974
Leo Genn	M	1905	1978	72	1	0	S	Quo Vadis	1951	1951
Chief Dan George	M	1899	1981	82	1	0	S	Little Big Man	1970	1970
Gladys George	F	1904	1954	50	1	0	L	Valiant Is the Word for Carrie	1936	1936
Paul Giamatti	M	1967	~	59	2	0	1L:1S	The Holdovers	2005	2023
Giancarlo Giannini	M	1942	~	84	1	0	L	Seven Beauties	1976	1976
John Gielgud	M	1904	2000	96	2	1	S	Arthur	1964	1981
Jack Gilford	M	1907	1990	82	1	0	S	Save the Tiger	1973	1973
Lillian Gish	F	1893	1993	99	1	0	S	Duel in the Sun	1946	1946
Lily Gladstone	F	1986	~	40	1	0	L	Killers of the Flower Moon	2023	2023
Jackie Gleason	M	1916	1987	71	1	0	S	The Hustler	1961	1961
James Gleason	M	1882	1959	76	1	0	S	Here Comes Mr. Jordan	1941	1941
Brendan Gleeson	M	1955	~	71	1	0	S	The Banshees of Inisherin	2022	2022
Paulette Goddard	F	1910	1990	79	1	0	S	So Proudly We Hail!	1943	1943
Whoopi Goldberg	F	1955	~	71	2	1	1L0:1S1	Ghost	1985	1990
Thomas Gomez	M	1905	1971	65	1	0	S	Ride the Pink Horse	1947	1947
Cuba Gooding Jr.	M	1968	~	58	1	1	S	Jerry Maguire	1996	1996
Dexter Gordon	M	1923	1990	67	1	0	L	Round Midnight	1986	1986
Ruth Gordon	F	1896	1985	88	2	1	S	Rosemary's Baby	1965	1968
Ryan Gosling	M	1980	~	46	3	0	2L:1S	Half Nelson	2006	2023
Louis Gossett Jr.	M	1936	2024	87	1	1	S	An Officer and a Gentleman	1982	1982
Elliott Gould	M	1938	~	88	1	0	S	Bob & Carol & Ted & Alice	1969	1969
Gloria Grahame	F	1923	1981	57	2	1	S	The Bad and the Beautiful	1947	1952
Ariana Grande	F	1993	~	33	1	0	S	Wicked	2024	2024
Cary Grant	M	1904	1986	82	2	0	L	Penny Serenade	1941	1944
Lee Grant	F	1925 *	~	101	4	1	S	Shampoo	1951	1976
Richard E. Grant	M	1957	~	69	1	0	S	Can You Ever Forgive Me?	2018	2018
Bonita Granville	F	1923	1988	65	1	0	S	These Three	1936	1936
Graham Greene	M	1952	2025	73	1	0	S	Dances With Wolves	1990	1990
Sydney Greenstreet	M	1879	1954	74	1	0	S	The Maltese Falcon	1941	1941
Joel Grey	M	1932	~	94	1	1	S	Cabaret	1972	1972
Corinne Griffith	F	1894	1979	84	1	0	L	The Divine Lady	1929	1929
Hugh Griffith	M	1912	1980	67	2	1	S	Ben-Hur	1959	1963
Melanie Griffith	F	1957	~	69	1	0	L	Working Girl	1988	1988
Rachel Griffiths	F	1968	~	57	1	0	S	Hilary and Jackie	1998	1998
Alec Guinness	M	1914	2000	86	4	1	2L1:2S0	The Bridge on the River Kwai	1952	1988
Edmund Gwenn	M	1877	1959	81	2	1	S	Miracle on 34th Street	1947	1950
Jake Gyllenhaal	M	1980	~	45	1	0	S	Brokeback Mountain	2005	2005
Maggie Gyllenhaal	F	1977	~	49	1	0	S	Crazy Heart	2009	2009
Joan Hackett	F	1934	1983	49	1	0	S	Only When I Laugh	1981	1981
Gene Hackman	M	1930	2025	95	5	2	2L1:3S1	The French Connection (Note: Gene Hackman also won Best Supporting Actor for Unforgiven (1992).)	1967	1992
Jean Hagen	F	1923	1977	54	1	0	S	Singin' in the Rain	1952	1952
Jackie Earle Haley	M	1961	~	65	1	0	S	Little Children	2006	2006
Grayson Hall	F	1922	1985	62	1	0	S	The Night of the Iguana	1964	1964
Tom Hanks	M	1956	~	70	6	2	5L2:1S0	Philadelphia (Note: Tom Hanks also won Best Actor for Forrest Gump (1994).)	1988	2019
Marcia Gay Harden	F	1959	~	67	2	1	S	Pollock	2000	2003
Ann Harding	F	1902	1981	79	1	0	L	Holiday	1930	1930
Tom Hardy	M	1977	~	49	1	0	S	The Revenant	2015	2015
Tess Harper	F	1950	~	76	1	0	S	Crimes of the Heart	1986	1986
Woody Harrelson	M	1961	~	65	3	0	1L:2S	The People vs. Larry Flynt	1996	2017
Barbara Harris	F	1935	2018	83	1	0	S	Who Is Harry Kellerman and Why Is He Saying Those Terrible Things About Me?	1971	1971
Ed Harris	M	1950	~	75	4	0	1L:3S	Pollock	1995	2002
Julie Harris	F	1925	2013	87	1	0	L	The Member of the Wedding	1952	1952
Naomie Harris	F	1976	~	50	1	0	S	Moonlight	2016	2016
Richard Harris	M	1930	2002	72	2	0	L	This Sporting Life	1963	1990
Rosemary Harris	F	1927	~	99	1	0	S	Tom & Viv	1994	1994
Rex Harrison	M	1908	1990	82	2	1	L	My Fair Lady	1963	1964
Elizabeth Hartman	F	1943	1987	43	1	0	L	A Patch of Blue	1965	1965
Laurence Harvey	M	1928	1973	45	1	0	L	Room at the Top	1959	1959
Anne Hathaway	F	1982	~	44	2	1	1L0:1S1	Les Misérables	2008	2012
Ethan Hawke	M	1970	~	56	3	0	1L:2S	Blue Moon	2001	2025
John Hawkes	M	1959	~	67	1	0	S	Winter's Bone	2010	2010
Sally Hawkins	F	1976	~	50	2	0	1L:1S	The Shape of Water	2013	2017
Goldie Hawn	F	1945	~	80	2	1	1L0:1S1	Cactus Flower	1969	1980
Nigel Hawthorne	M	1929	2001	72	1	0	L	The Madness of King George	1994	1994
Sessue Hayakawa	M	1889	1973	84	1	0	S	The Bridge on the River Kwai	1957	1957
Salma Hayek	F	1966	~	60	1	0	L	Frida	2002	2002
Helen Hayes	F	1900	1993	92	2	2	1L1:1S1	The Sin of Madelon Claudet (Note: Helen Hayes also won Best Supporting Actress for Airport (1970).)	1931	1970
Susan Hayward	F	1917	1975	57	5	1	L	I Want to Live!	1947	1958
Eileen Heckart	F	1919	2001	82	2	1	S	Butterflies Are Free	1956	1972
Lucas Hedges	M	1996	~	29	1	0	S	Manchester by the Sea	2016	2016
Van Heflin	M	1908	1971	62	1	1	S	Johnny Eager	1942	1942
Mariel Hemingway	F	1961	~	64	1	0	S	Manhattan	1979	1979
Brian Tyree Henry	M	1982	~	44	1	0	S	Causeway	2022	2022
Justin Henry	M	1971	~	55	1	0	S	Kramer vs. Kramer	1979	1979
Taraji P. Henson	F	1970	~	56	1	0	S	The Curious Case of Benjamin Button	2008	2008
Audrey Hepburn	F	1929	1993	63	5	1	L	Roman Holiday	1953	1967
Katharine Hepburn	F	1907	2003	96	12	4	L	Morning Glory (Note: Katharine Hepburn also won Best Actress for Guess Who's Coming to Dinner (1967), The Lion in Winter (1968), and On Golden Pond (1981).)	1933	1981
Barbara Hershey	F	1948	~	78	1	0	S	The Portrait of a Lady	1996	1996
Charlton Heston	M	1923	2008	84	1	1	L	Ben-Hur	1959	1959
William Hickey	M	1927	1997	69	1	0	S	Prizzi's Honor	1985	1985
Jonah Hill	M	1983	~	42	2	0	S	Moneyball	2011	2013
Wendy Hiller	F	1912	2003	90	3	1	1L0:2S1	Separate Tables	1938	1966
Ciarán Hinds	M	1953	~	73	1	0	S	Belfast	2021	2021
Judd Hirsch	M	1935	~	91	2	0	S	Ordinary People	1980	2022
Dustin Hoffman	M	1937	~	89	7	2	L	Kramer vs. Kramer (Note: Dustin Hoffman also won Best Actor for Rain Man (1988).)	1967	1997
Philip Seymour Hoffman	M	1967	2014	46	4	1	1L1:3S0	Capote	2005	2012
Hal Holbrook	M	1925	2021	95	1	0	S	Into the Wild	2007	2007
William Holden	M	1918	1981	63	3	1	L	Stalag 17	1950	1976
Judy Holliday	F	1921	1965	43	1	1	L	Born Yesterday	1950	1950
Stanley Holloway	M	1890	1982	91	1	0	S	My Fair Lady	1964	1964
Celeste Holm	F	1917	2012	95	3	1	S	Gentleman's Agreement	1947	1950
Ian Holm	M	1931	2020	88	1	0	S	Chariots of Fire	1981	1981
Oscar Homolka	M	1898	1978	79	1	0	S	I Remember Mama	1948	1948
Anthony Hopkins	M	1937	~	88	6	2	4L2:2S0	The Silence of the Lambs (Note: Anthony Hopkins also won Best Actor for The Father (2020).)	1991	2020
Miriam Hopkins	F	1902	1972	69	1	0	L	Becky Sharp	1935	1935
Dennis Hopper	M	1936	2010	74	1	0	S	Hoosiers	1986	1986
Bob Hoskins	M	1942	2014	71	1	0	L	Mona Lisa	1986	1986
Djimon Hounsou	M	1964	~	62	2	0	S	In America	2003	2006
John Houseman	M	1902	1988	86	1	1	S	The Paper Chase	1973	1973
Leslie Howard	M	1893	1943	50	2	0	L	Berkeley Square	1933	1938
Terrence Howard	M	1969	~	57	1	0	L	Hustle & Flow	2005	2005
Trevor Howard	M	1913	1988	74	1	0	L	Sons and Lovers	1960	1960
Stephanie Hsu	F	1990	~	35	1	0	S	Everything Everywhere All at Once	2022	2022
Jennifer Hudson	F	1981	~	45	1	1	S	Dreamgirls	2006	2006
Kate Hudson	F	1979	~	47	2	0	1L:1S	Song Sung Blue	2000	2025
Rock Hudson	M	1925	1985	59	1	0	L	Giant	1956	1956
Felicity Huffman	F	1962	~	63	1	0	L	Transamerica	2005	2005
Tom Hulce	M	1953	~	72	1	0	L	Amadeus	1984	1984
Josephine Hull	F	1877	1957	80	1	1	S	Harvey	1950	1950
Sandra Hüller	F	1978	~	48	1	0	L	Anatomy of a Fall	2023	2023
Arthur Hunnicutt	M	1910	1979	69	1	0	S	The Big Sky	1952	1952
Helen Hunt	F	1963	~	63	2	1	1L1:1S0	As Good as It Gets	1997	2012
Linda Hunt	F	1945	~	81	1	1	S	The Year of Living Dangerously	1983	1983
Holly Hunter	F	1958	~	68	4	1	2L1:2S0	The Piano (Note: Holly Hunter was nominated for two awards at the 1994 ceremony: Best Actress for The Piano (1993) and Best Supporting Actress for The Firm (1993), winning in the lead actress category.)	1987	2003
Kim Hunter	F	1922	2002	79	1	1	S	A Streetcar Named Desire	1951	1951
Isabelle Huppert	F	1953	~	73	1	0	L	Elle	2016	2016
John Hurt	M	1940	2017	77	2	0	1L:1S	The Elephant Man	1978	1980
William Hurt	M	1950	2022	71	4	1	3L1:1S0	Kiss of the Spider Woman	1985	2005
Ruth Hussey	F	1911	2005	93	1	0	S	The Philadelphia Story	1940	1940
Anjelica Huston	F	1951	~	75	3	1	1L0:2S1	Prizzi's Honor	1985	1990
John Huston	M	1906	1987	81	1	0	S	The Cardinal	1963	1963
Walter Huston	M	1883	1950	67	4	1	2L0:2S1	The Treasure of the Sierra Madre	1936	1948
Timothy Hutton	M	1960	~	66	1	1	S	Ordinary People	1980	1980
Martha Hyer	F	1924	2014	89	1	0	S	Some Came Running	1958	1958
John Ireland	M	1914	1992	78	1	0	S	All the King's Men	1949	1949
Jeremy Irons	M	1948	~	78	1	1	L	Reversal of Fortune	1990	1990
Amy Irving	F	1953	~	73	1	0	S	Yentl	1983	1983
Burl Ives	M	1909	1995	85	1	1	S	The Big Country	1958	1958
Hugh Jackman	M	1968	~	58	1	0	L	Les Misérables	2012	2012
Glenda Jackson	F	1936	2023	87	4	2	L	Women in Love (Note: Glenda Jackson also won Best Actress for A Touch of Class (1973).)	1970	1975
Samuel L. Jackson	M	1948	~	77	1	0	S	Pulp Fiction	1994	1994
Richard Jaeckel	M	1926	1997	70	1	0	S	Sometimes a Great Notion	1971	1971
Sam Jaffe	M	1891	1984	93	1	0	S	The Asphalt Jungle	1950	1950
Dean Jagger	M	1903	1991	87	1	1	S	Twelve O'Clock High	1949	1949
Allison Janney	F	1959	~	67	1	1	S	I, Tonya	2017	2017
Emil Jannings	M	1884	1950	65	1	1	L	The Way of All Flesh	1927	1927
Marianne Jean-Baptiste	F	1967	~	59	1	0	S	Secrets & Lies	1996	1996
Richard Jenkins	M	1947	~	79	2	0	1L:1S	The Visitor	2008	2017
Scarlett Johansson	F	1984	~	41	2	0	1L:1S	Marriage Story (Note: Scarlett Johansson was nominated for two awards at the 2020 ceremony: Best Actress for Marriage Story and Best Supporting Actress for Jojo Rabbit, winning in neither category.)	2019	2019
Glynis Johns	F	1923	2024	100	1	0	S	The Sundowners	1960	1960
Ben Johnson	M	1918	1996	77	1	1	S	The Last Picture Show	1971	1971
Celia Johnson	F	1908	1982	73	1	0	L	Brief Encounter	1946	1946
Angelina Jolie	F	1975	~	51	2	1	1L0:1S1	Girl, Interrupted	1999	2008
Carolyn Jones	F	1930	1983	53	1	0	S	The Bachelor Party	1957	1957
Felicity Jones	F	1983	~	43	2	0	1L:1S	The Theory of Everything	2014	2024
James Earl Jones	M	1931	2024	93	1	0	L	The Great White Hope	1970	1970
Jennifer Jones	F	1919	2009	90	5	1	4L1:1S0	The Song of Bernadette	1943	1955
Shirley Jones	F	1934	~	92	1	1	S	Elmer Gantry	1960	1960
Tommy Lee Jones	M	1946	~	80	4	1	1L0:3S1	The Fugitive	1991	2012
Michael B. Jordan	M	1987	~	39	1	1	L	Sinners	2025	2025
Katy Jurado	F	1924	2002	78	1	0	S	Broken Lance	1954	1954
Madeline Kahn	F	1942	1999	57	2	0	S	Paper Moon	1973	1974
Daniel Kaluuya	M	1989	~	37	2	1	1L0:1S1	Judas and the Black Messiah	2017	2020
Ida Kamińska	F	1899	1980	80	1	0	L	The Shop on Main Street	1966	1966
Carol Kane	F	1952	~	74	1	0	L	Hester Street	1975	1975
Diane Keaton	F	1946	2025	79	4	1	L	Annie Hall	1977	2003
Michael Keaton	M	1951	~	75	1	0	L	Birdman	2014	2014
Lila Kedrova	F	1909	2000	90	1	1	S	Zorba the Greek	1964	1964
Catherine Keener	F	1959	~	67	2	0	S	Being John Malkovich	1999	2005
Harvey Keitel	M	1939	~	87	1	0	S	Bugsy	1991	1991
Cecil Kellaway	M	1890	1973	82	2	0	S	The Luck of the Irish	1948	1967
Sally Kellerman	F	1937	2022	84	1	0	S	M*A*S*H	1970	1970
Gene Kelly	M	1912	1996	83	1	0	L	Anchors Aweigh	1945	1945
Grace Kelly	F	1929	1982	52	2	1	1L1:1S0	The Country Girl	1953	1954
Nancy Kelly	F	1921	1995	73	1	0	L	The Bad Seed	1956	1956
Anna Kendrick	F	1985	~	41	1	0	S	Up in the Air	2009	2009
Arthur Kennedy	M	1914	1990	75	5	0	1L:4S	Bright Victory	1949	1958
George Kennedy	M	1925	2016	91	1	1	S	Cool Hand Luke	1967	1967
Barry Keoghan	M	1992	~	34	1	0	S	The Banshees of Inisherin	2022	2022
Deborah Kerr	F	1921	2007	86	6	0	L	Edward, My Son	1949	1960
Nicole Kidman	F	1967	~	59	5	1	4L1:1S0	The Hours	2001	2021
Rinko Kikuchi	F	1981	~	45	1	0	S	Babel	2006	2006
Regina King	F	1971	~	55	1	1	S	If Beale Street Could Talk	2018	2018
Ben Kingsley	M	1943	~	82	4	1	2L1:2S0	Gandhi	1982	2003
Greg Kinnear	M	1963	~	63	1	0	S	As Good as It Gets	1997	1997
Vanessa Kirby	F	1988	~	38	1	0	L	Pieces of a Woman	2020	2020
Sally Kirkland	F	1941	2025	84	1	0	L	Anna	1987	1987
Kevin Kline	M	1947	~	79	1	1	S	A Fish Called Wanda	1988	1988
Shirley Knight	F	1936	2020	83	2	0	S	The Dark at the Top of the Stairs	1960	1962
Keira Knightley	F	1985	~	41	2	0	1L:1S	Pride & Prejudice	2005	2014
Alexander Knox	M	1907	1995	88	1	0	L	Wilson	1944	1944
Susan Kohner	F	1936	~	90	1	0	S	Imitation of Life	1959	1959
Miliza Korjus	F	1909	1980	71	1	0	S	The Great Waltz	1938	1938
Troy Kotsur	M	1968	~	58	1	1	S	CODA	2021	2021
Jack Kruschen	M	1922	2002	80	1	0	S	The Apartment	1960	1960
Diane Ladd	F	1935	2025	89	3	0	S	Alice Doesn't Live Here Anymore	1974	1991
Jocelyne LaGarde	F	1924	1979	55	1	0	S	Hawaii	1966	1966
Christine Lahti	F	1950	~	76	1	0	S	Swing Shift	1984	1984
Burt Lancaster	M	1913	1994	80	4	1	L	Elmer Gantry	1953	1981
Elsa Lanchester	F	1902	1986	84	2	0	S	Come to the Stable	1949	1957
Martin Landau	M	1928	2017	89	3	1	S	Ed Wood	1988	1994
Diane Lane	F	1965	~	61	1	0	L	Unfaithful	2002	2002
Hope Lange	F	1933	2003	70	1	0	S	Peyton Place	1957	1957
Jessica Lange	F	1949	~	77	6	2	5L1:1S1	Blue Sky (Note: Jessica Lange also won Best Supporting Actress for Tootsie (1982).) (Note: Jessica Lange was nominated for two awards at the 1983 ceremony: Best Actress for Frances (1982) and Best Supporting Actress for Tootsie (1982), winning in the supporting actress category.)	1982	1994
Frank Langella	M	1938	~	88	1	0	L	Frost/Nixon	2008	2008
Angela Lansbury	F	1925	2022	96	3	0	S	Gaslight	1944	1962
Brie Larson	F	1989	~	37	1	1	L	Room	2015	2015
Queen Latifah	F	1970	~	56	1	0	S	Chicago	2002	2002
Charles Laughton	M	1899	1962	63	3	1	L	The Private Life of Henry VIII	1933	1957
Piper Laurie	F	1932	2023	91	3	0	1L:2S	The Hustler	1961	1986
Jude Law	M	1972	~	53	2	0	1L:1S	Cold Mountain	1999	2003
Jennifer Lawrence	F	1990	~	36	4	1	3L1:1S0	Silver Linings Playbook	2010	2015
Eva Le Gallienne	F	1899	1991	92	1	0	S	Resurrection	1980	1980
Cloris Leachman	F	1926	2021	94	1	1	S	The Last Picture Show	1971	1971
Heath Ledger	M	1979	2008	28	2	1	1L0:1S1	The Dark Knight	2005	2008
Peggy Lee	F	1920	2002	81	1	0	S	Pete Kelly's Blues	1955	1955
Andrea Leeds	F	1914	1984	69	1	0	S	Stage Door	1937	1937
Janet Leigh	F	1927	2004	77	1	0	S	Psycho	1960	1960
Jennifer Jason Leigh	F	1962	~	64	1	0	S	The Hateful Eight	2015	2015
Vivien Leigh	F	1913	1967	53	2	2	L	Gone with the Wind (Note: Vivien Leigh also won Best Actress for A Streetcar Named Desire (1951).)	1939	1951
Margaret Leighton	F	1922	1976	53	1	0	S	The Go-Between	1971	1971
Jack Lemmon	M	1925	2001	76	8	2	7L1:1S1	Save the Tiger (Note: Jack Lemmon also won Best Supporting Actor for Mister Roberts (1955).)	1955	1982
Lotte Lenya	F	1898	1981	83	1	0	S	The Roman Spring of Mrs. Stone	1961	1961
Melissa Leo	F	1960	~	66	2	1	1L0:1S1	The Fighter	2008	2010
Michael Lerner	M	1941	2023	81	1	0	S	Barton Fink	1991	1991
Jared Leto	M	1971	~	54	1	1	S	Dallas Buyers Club	2013	2013
Juliette Lewis	F	1973	~	53	1	0	S	Cape Fear	1991	1991
Inga Ibsdotter Lilleaas	F	1989	~	37	1	0	S	Sentimental Value	2025	2025
Delroy Lindo	M	1952	~	74	1	0	S	Sinners	2025	2025
Laura Linney	F	1964	~	62	3	0	2L:1S	You Can Count on Me	2000	2007
John Lithgow	M	1945	~	81	2	0	S	The World According to Garp	1982	1983
Sondra Locke	F	1944	2018	74	1	0	S	The Heart Is a Lonely Hunter	1968	1968
Gene Lockhart	M	1891	1957	65	1	0	S	Algiers	1938	1938
Robert Loggia	M	1930	2015	85	1	0	S	Jagged Edge	1985	1985
Carole Lombard	F	1908	1942	33	1	0	L	My Man Godfrey	1936	1936
Sophia Loren	F	1934	~	92	2	1	L	Two Women	1961	1964
Joan Lorring	F	1926	2014	88	1	0	S	The Corn Is Green	1945	1945
Bessie Love	F	1898	1986	87	1	0	L	The Broadway Melody	1929	1929
Paul Lukas	M	1891	1971	80	1	1	L	Watch on the Rhine	1943	1943
Alfred Lunt	M	1892	1977	84	1	0	L	The Guardsman	1931	1931
Ali MacGraw	F	1939	~	87	1	0	L	Love Story	1970	1970
Shirley MacLaine	F	1934	~	92	5	1	L	Terms of Endearment	1958	1983
Aline MacMahon	F	1899	1991	92	1	0	S	Dragon Seed	1944	1944
William H. Macy	M	1950	~	76	1	0	S	Fargo	1996	1996
Amy Madigan	F	1950	~	76	2	1	S	Weapons	1985	2025
Mikey Madison	F	1999	~	27	1	1	L	Anora	2024	2024
Virginia Madsen	F	1961	~	65	1	0	S	Sideways	2004	2004
Anna Magnani	F	1908	1973	65	2	1	L	The Rose Tattoo	1955	1957
Marjorie Main	F	1890	1975	85	1	0	S	The Egg and I	1947	1947
Mako	M	1933	2006	72	1	0	S	The Sand Pebbles	1966	1966
Karl Malden	M	1912	2009	97	2	1	S	A Streetcar Named Desire	1951	1954
Rami Malek	M	1981	~	45	1	1	L	Bohemian Rhapsody	2018	2018
John Malkovich	M	1953	~	72	2	0	S	Places in the Heart	1984	1993
Dorothy Malone	F	1924	2018	93	1	1	S	Written on the Wind	1956	1956
Joe Mantell	M	1915	2010	94	1	0	S	Marty	1955	1955
Lesley Manville	F	1956	~	70	1	0	S	Phantom Thread	2017	2017
Rooney Mara	F	1985	~	41	2	0	1L:1S	The Girl with the Dragon Tattoo	2011	2015
Fredric March	M	1897	1975	77	5	2	L	Dr. Jekyll and Mr. Hyde (Note: Fredric March also won Best Actor for The Best Years of Our Lives (1946).)	1930	1951
Colette Marchand	F	1925	2015	90	1	0	S	Moulin Rouge	1952	1952
John Marley	M	1907	1984	76	1	0	S	Love Story	1970	1970
Lee Marvin	M	1924	1987	63	1	1	L	Cat Ballou	1965	1965
James Mason	M	1909	1984	75	3	0	1L:2S	A Star Is Born	1954	1982
Marsha Mason	F	1942	~	84	4	0	L	Cinderella Liberty	1973	1981
Daniel Massey	M	1933	1998	64	1	0	S	Star!	1968	1968
Raymond Massey	M	1896	1983	86	1	0	L	Abe Lincoln in Illinois	1940	1940
Mary Elizabeth Mastrantonio	F	1958	~	68	1	0	S	The Color of Money	1986	1986
Marcello Mastroianni	M	1924	1996	72	3	0	L	Divorce Italian Style	1962	1987
Marlee Matlin	F	1965	~	61	1	1	L	Children of a Lesser God	1986	1986
Walter Matthau	M	1920	2000	79	3	1	2L0:1S1	The Fortune Cookie	1966	1975
Rachel McAdams	F	1978	~	48	1	0	S	Spotlight	2015	2015
Mercedes McCambridge	F	1916	2004	87	2	1	S	All the King's Men	1949	1956
Kevin McCarthy	M	1914	2010	96	1	0	S	Death of a Salesman	1951	1951
Melissa McCarthy	F	1970	~	56	2	0	1L:1S	Can You Ever Forgive Me?	2011	2018
Matthew McConaughey	M	1969	~	57	1	1	L	Dallas Buyers Club	2013	2013
Patty McCormack	F	1945	~	81	1	0	S	The Bad Seed	1956	1956
Hattie McDaniel	F	1893	1952	59	1	1	S	Gone with the Wind	1939	1939
Mary McDonnell	F	1952	~	74	2	0	1L:1S	Passion Fish	1990	1992
Frances McDormand	F	1957	~	69	6	3	3L3:3S0	Fargo (Note: Frances McDormand also won Best Actress for Three Billboards Outside Ebbing, Missouri (2017) and Nomadland (2020).)	1988	2020
Elizabeth McGovern	F	1961	~	65	1	0	S	Ragtime	1981	1981
Dorothy McGuire	F	1916	2001	85	1	0	L	Gentleman's Agreement	1947	1947
Ian McKellen	M	1939	~	87	2	0	1L:1S	Gods and Monsters	1998	2001
Victor McLaglen	M	1886	1959	72	2	1	1L1:1S0	The Informer	1935	1952
Maggie McNamara	F	1928	1978	49	1	0	L	The Moon Is Blue	1953	1953
Steve McQueen	M	1930	1980	50	1	0	L	The Sand Pebbles	1966	1966
Janet McTeer	F	1961	~	65	2	0	1L:1S	Tumbleweeds	1999	2011
Kay Medford	F	1919	1980	60	1	0	S	Funny Girl	1968	1968
Adolphe Menjou	M	1890	1963	73	1	0	L	The Front Page	1931	1931
Vivien Merchant	F	1929	1982	53	1	0	S	Alfie	1966	1966
Melina Mercouri	F	1920	1994	73	1	0	L	Never on Sunday	1960	1960
Burgess Meredith	M	1907	1997	89	2	0	S	The Day of the Locust	1975	1976
Una Merkel	F	1903	1986	82	1	0	S	Summer and Smoke	1961	1961
Paul Mescal	M	1996	~	30	1	0	L	Aftersun	2022	2022
Laurie Metcalf	F	1955	~	71	1	0	S	Lady Bird	2017	2017
Bette Midler	F	1945	~	80	2	0	L	The Rose	1979	1991
Sarah Miles	F	1941	~	84	1	0	L	Ryan's Daughter	1970	1970
Sylvia Miles	F	1924	2019	94	2	0	S	Midnight Cowboy	1969	1975
Penelope Milford	F	1948	2025	77	1	0	S	Coming Home	1978	1978
Ray Milland	M	1907	1986	79	1	1	L	The Lost Weekend	1945	1945
Jason Miller	M	1939	2001	62	1	0	S	The Exorcist	1973	1973
John Mills	M	1908	2005	97	1	1	S	Ryan's Daughter	1970	1970
Sal Mineo	M	1939	1976	37	2	0	S	Rebel Without a Cause	1955	1960
Liza Minnelli	F	1946	~	80	2	1	L	Cabaret	1969	1972
Helen Mirren	F	1945	~	81	4	1	2L1:2S0	The Queen	1994	2009
Thomas Mitchell	M	1892	1962	70	2	1	S	Stagecoach	1937	1939
Robert Mitchum	M	1917	1997	79	1	0	S	The Story of G.I. Joe	1945	1945
Mo'Nique	F	1967	~	58	1	1	S	Precious	2009	2009
Fernanda Montenegro	F	1929	~	97	1	0	L	Central Station	1998	1998
Robert Montgomery	M	1904	1981	77	2	0	L	Night Must Fall	1937	1941
Ron Moody	M	1924	2015	91	1	0	L	Oliver!	1968	1968
Demi Moore	F	1962	~	64	1	0	L	The Substance	2024	2024
Dudley Moore	M	1935	2002	66	1	0	L	Arthur	1981	1981
Grace Moore	F	1898	1947	48	1	0	L	One Night of Love	1934	1934
Juanita Moore	F	1914	2014	99	1	0	S	Imitation of Life	1959	1959
Julianne Moore	F	1960	~	65	5	1	3L1:2S0	Still Alice (Note: Julianne Moore was nominated for two awards at the 2003 ceremony: Best Actress for Far from Heaven (2002) and Best Supporting Actress for The Hours (2002), winning in neither category.)	1997	2014
Mary Tyler Moore	F	1936	2017	80	1	0	L	Ordinary People	1980	1980
Terry Moore	F	1929	~	97	1	0	S	Come Back, Little Sheba	1952	1952
Agnes Moorehead	F	1900	1974	73	4	0	S	The Magnificent Ambersons	1942	1964
Rita Moreno	F	1931	~	94	1	1	S	West Side Story	1961	1961
Frank Morgan	M	1890	1949	59	2	0	1L:1S	The Affairs of Cellini	1934	1942
Cathy Moriarty	F	1960	~	65	1	0	S	Raging Bull	1980	1980
Pat Morita	M	1932	2005	73	1	0	S	The Karate Kid	1984	1984
Robert Morley	M	1908	1992	84	1	0	S	Marie Antoinette	1938	1938
Chester Morris	M	1901	1970	69	1	0	L	Alibi	1929	1929
Viggo Mortensen	M	1958	~	68	3	0	L	Eastern Promises	2007	2018
Samantha Morton	F	1977	~	49	2	0	1L:1S	In America	1999	2003
Wunmi Mosaku	F	1986	~	40	1	0	S	Sinners	2025	2025
Wagner Moura	M	1976	~	50	1	0	L	The Secret Agent	2025	2025
Armin Mueller-Stahl	M	1930	~	95	1	0	S	Shine	1996	1996
Carey Mulligan	F	1985	~	41	3	0	L	An Education	2009	2023
Paul Muni	M	1895	1967	71	6	1	L	The Story of Louis Pasteur	1929	1959
Cillian Murphy	M	1976	~	50	1	1	L	Oppenheimer	2023	2023
Eddie Murphy	M	1961	~	65	1	0	S	Dreamgirls	2006	2006
Bill Murray	M	1950	~	76	1	0	L	Lost in Translation	2003	2003
Don Murray	M	1929	2024	94	1	0	S	Bus Stop	1956	1956
J. Carrol Naish	M	1896	1973	77	2	0	S	Sahara	1943	1945
Mildred Natwick	F	1905	1994	89	1	0	S	Barefoot in the Park	1967	1967
Patricia Neal	F	1926	2010	84	2	1	L	Hud	1963	1968
Liam Neeson	M	1952	~	74	1	0	L	Schindler's List	1993	1993
Ruth Negga	F	1982	~	44	1	0	L	Loving	2016	2016
Kate Nelligan	F	1950	~	76	1	0	S	The Prince of Tides	1991	1991
Paul Newman	M	1925	2008	83	9	1	8L1:1S0	The Color of Money	1958	2002
Haing S. Ngor	M	1940	1996	55	1	1	S	The Killing Fields	1984	1984
Jack Nicholson	M	1937	~	89	12	3	8L2:4S1	One Flew Over the Cuckoo's Nest (Note: Jack Nicholson also won Best Actor for As Good as It Gets (1997) and Best Supporting Actor for Terms of Endearment (1983).)	1969	2002
Bill Nighy	M	1949	~	76	1	0	L	Living	2022	2022
David Niven	M	1910	1983	73	1	1	L	Separate Tables	1958	1958
Nick Nolte	M	1941	~	85	3	0	2L:1S	The Prince of Tides	1991	2011
Edward Norton	M	1969	~	57	4	0	1L:3S	American History X	1996	2024
Lupita Nyong'o	F	1983	~	43	1	1	S	12 Years a Slave	2013	2013
Edmond O'Brien	M	1915	1985	69	2	1	S	The Barefoot Contessa	1954	1964
Arthur O'Connell	M	1908	1981	73	2	0	S	Picnic	1955	1959
Dan O'Herlihy	M	1919	2005	85	1	0	L	Robinson Crusoe	1954	1954
Michael O'Keefe	M	1955	~	71	1	0	S	The Great Santini	1980	1980
Ryan O'Neal	M	1941	2023	82	1	0	L	Love Story	1970	1970
Tatum O'Neal	F	1963	~	63	1	1	S	Paper Moon	1973	1973
Barbara O'Neil	F	1910	1980	70	1	0	S	All This, and Heaven Too	1940	1940
Peter O'Toole	M	1932	2013	81	8	0	L	Lawrence of Arabia	1962	2006
Jack Oakie	M	1903	1978	74	1	0	S	The Great Dictator	1940	1940
Merle Oberon	F	1911	1979	68	1	0	L	The Dark Angel	1935	1935
Leslie Odom Jr.	M	1981	~	45	1	0	S	One Night in Miami...	2020	2020
Sophie Okonedo	F	1968	~	58	1	0	S	Hotel Rwanda	2004	2004
Gary Oldman	M	1958	~	68	3	1	L	Darkest Hour	2011	2020
Lena Olin	F	1955	~	71	1	0	S	Enemies, A Love Story	1989	1989
Edna May Oliver	F	1883	1942	59	1	0	S	Drums Along the Mohawk	1939	1939
Laurence Olivier	M	1907	1989	82	10	1	9L1:1S0	Hamlet	1939	1978
Edward James Olmos	M	1947	~	79	1	0	L	Stand and Deliver	1988	1988
Nancy Olson	F	1928	~	98	1	0	S	Sunset Boulevard	1950	1950
Haley Joel Osment	M	1988	~	38	1	0	S	The Sixth Sense	1999	1999
Maria Ouspenskaya	F	1876	1949	73	2	0	S	Dodsworth	1936	1939
Clive Owen	M	1964	~	62	1	0	S	Closer	2004	2004
Al Pacino	M	1940	~	86	9	1	5L1:4S0	Scent of a Woman (Note: Al Pacino was nominated for two awards at the 1993 ceremony: Best Actor for Scent of a Woman (1992) and Best Supporting Actor for Glengarry Glen Ross (1992), winning in the lead actor category.)	1972	2019
Elliot Page	M (Note: Transgender actor who was nominated while identifying as a woman, Ellen Page.)	1987	~	39	1	0	L	Juno	2007	2007
Geraldine Page	F	1924	1987	62	8	1	4L1:4S0	The Trip to Bountiful	1953	1985
Jack Palance	M	1919	2006	87	3	1	S	City Slickers	1952	1991
Chazz Palminteri	M	1952	~	74	1	0	S	Bullets Over Broadway	1994	1994
Gwyneth Paltrow	F	1972	~	54	1	1	L	Shakespeare in Love	1998	1998
Anna Paquin	F	1982	~	44	1	1	S	The Piano	1993	1993
Eleanor Parker	F	1922	2013	91	3	0	L	Caged	1950	1955
Larry Parks	M	1914	1975	60	1	0	L	The Jolson Story	1946	1946
Estelle Parsons	F	1927	~	99	2	1	S	Bonnie and Clyde	1967	1968
Dev Patel	M	1990	~	36	1	0	S	Lion	2016	2016
Marisa Pavan	F	1932	2023	91	1	0	S	The Rose Tattoo	1955	1955
Katina Paxinou	F	1900	1973	72	1	1	S	For Whom the Bell Tolls	1943	1943
David Paymer	M	1954	~	72	1	0	S	Mr. Saturday Night	1992	1992
Guy Pearce	M	1967	~	59	1	0	S	The Brutalist	2024	2024
Gregory Peck	M	1916	2003	87	5	1	L	To Kill a Mockingbird	1945	1962
Sean Penn	M	1960	~	66	6	3	5L2:1S1	Mystic River (Note: Sean Penn also won Best Actor for Milk (2008) and Best Supporting Actor for One Battle After Another (2025).)	1995	2025
Rosie Perez	F	1964	~	62	1	0	S	Fearless	1993	1993
Anthony Perkins	M	1932	1992	60	1	0	S	Friendly Persuasion	1956	1956
Valerie Perrine	F	1943	2026	82	1	0	L	Lenny	1974	1974
Joe Pesci	M	1943	~	83	3	1	S	Goodfellas	1980	2019
Susan Peters	F	1921	1952	31	1	0	S	Random Harvest	1942	1942
Michelle Pfeiffer	F	1958	~	68	3	0	2L:1S	The Fabulous Baker Boys	1988	1992
Joaquin Phoenix	M	1974	~	52	4	1	3L1:1S0	Joker	2000	2019
River Phoenix	M	1970	1993	23	1	0	S	Running on Empty	1988	1988
Mary Pickford	F	1892	1979	87	1	1	L	Coquette	1929	1929
Walter Pidgeon	M	1897	1984	87	2	0	L	Mrs. Miniver	1942	1943
Rosamund Pike	F	1979	~	47	1	0	L	Gone Girl	2014	2014
Brad Pitt	M	1963	~	62	4	1	2L0:2S1	Once Upon a Time in Hollywood	1995	2019
Jesse Plemons	M	1988	~	38	1	0	S	The Power of the Dog	2021	2021
Joan Plowright	F	1929	2025	95	1	0	S	Enchanted April	1992	1992
Christopher Plummer	M	1929	2021	91	3	1	S	Beginners	2009	2017
Sidney Poitier	M	1927	2022	94	2	1	L	Lilies of the Field	1958	1963
Michael J. Pollard	M	1939	2019	80	1	0	S	Bonnie and Clyde	1967	1967
Natalie Portman	F	1981	~	45	3	1	2L1:1S0	Black Swan	2004	2016
Pete Postlethwaite	M	1946	2011	64	1	0	S	In the Name of the Father	1993	1993
William Powell	M	1892	1984	91	3	0	L	The Thin Man	1934	1947
Robert Preston	M	1918	1987	68	1	0	S	Victor/Victoria	1982	1982
Jonathan Pryce	M	1947	~	79	1	0	L	The Two Popes	2019	2019
Florence Pugh	F	1996	~	30	1	0	S	Little Women	2019	2019
Randy Quaid	M	1950	~	76	1	0	S	The Last Detail	1973	1973
Ke Huy Quan	M	1971	~	55	1	1	S	Everything Everywhere All at Once	2022	2022
Anthony Quayle	M	1913	1989	76	1	0	S	Anne of the Thousand Days	1969	1969
Kathleen Quinlan	F	1954	~	72	1	0	S	Apollo 13	1995	1995
Anthony Quinn	M	1915	2001	86	4	2	2L0:2S2	Viva Zapata! (Note: Anthony Quinn also won Best Supporting Actor for Lust for Life (1956).)	1952	1964
Paul Raci	M	1948	~	78	1	0	S	Sound of Metal	2020	2020
Luise Rainer	F	1910	2014	104	2	2	L	The Great Ziegfeld (Note: Luise Rainer also won Best Actress for The Good Earth (1937).)	1936	1937
Claude Rains	M	1889	1967	77	4	0	S	Mr. Smith Goes to Washington	1939	1946
Marjorie Rambeau	F	1889	1970	80	2	0	S	Primrose Path	1940	1953
Charlotte Rampling	F	1946	~	80	1	0	L	45 Years	2015	2015
Anne Ramsey	F	1929	1988	59	1	0	S	Throw Momma from the Train	1987	1987
Da'Vine Joy Randolph	F	1986	~	40	1	1	S	The Holdovers	2023	2023
Basil Rathbone	M	1892	1967	75	2	0	S	Romeo and Juliet	1936	1938
Stephen Rea	M	1946	~	80	1	0	L	The Crying Game	1992	1992
Robert Redford	M	1936	2025	89	1	0	L	The Sting	1973	1973
Lynn Redgrave	F	1943	2010	67	2	0	1L:1S	Georgy Girl	1966	1998
Michael Redgrave	M	1908	1985	77	1	0	L	Mourning Becomes Electra	1947	1947
Vanessa Redgrave	F	1937	~	89	6	1	4L0:2S1	Julia	1966	1992
Joyce Redman	F	1915	2012	96	2	0	S	Tom Jones	1963	1965
Eddie Redmayne	M	1982	~	44	2	1	L	The Theory of Everything	2014	2015
Donna Reed	F	1921	1986	64	1	1	S	From Here to Eternity	1953	1953
John C. Reilly	M	1965	~	61	1	0	S	Chicago	2002	2002
Renate Reinsve	F	1987	~	38	1	0	L	Sentimental Value	2025	2025
Lee Remick	F	1935	1991	55	1	0	L	Days of Wine and Roses	1962	1962
Jeremy Renner	M	1971	~	55	2	0	1L:1S	The Hurt Locker	2009	2010
Anne Revere	F	1903	1990	87	3	1	S	National Velvet	1943	1947
Burt Reynolds	M	1936	2018	82	1	0	S	Boogie Nights	1997	1997
Debbie Reynolds	F	1932	2016	84	1	0	L	The Unsinkable Molly Brown	1964	1964
Beah Richards	F	1920	2000	80	1	0	S	Guess Who's Coming to Dinner	1967	1967
Miranda Richardson	F	1958	~	68	2	0	1L:1S	Tom & Viv	1992	1994
Ralph Richardson	M	1902	1983	80	2	0	S	The Heiress	1949	1984
Andrea Riseborough	F	1981	~	45	1	0	L	To Leslie	2022	2022
Thelma Ritter	F	1902	1969	66	6	0	S	All About Eve	1950	1962
Emmanuelle Riva	F	1927	2017	89	1	0	L	Amour	2012	2012
Jason Robards	M	1922	2000	78	3	2	S	All the President's Men (Note: Jason Robards also won Best Supporting Actor for Julia (1977).)	1976	1980
Margot Robbie	F	1990	~	36	2	0	1L:1S	I, Tonya	2017	2019
Tim Robbins	M	1958	~	68	1	1	S	Mystic River	2003	2003
Eric Roberts	M	1956	~	70	1	0	S	Runaway Train	1985	1985
Julia Roberts	F	1967	~	59	4	1	2L1:2S0	Erin Brockovich	1989	2013
Rachel Roberts	F	1927	1980	53	1	0	L	This Sporting Life	1963	1963
Cliff Robertson	M	1923	2011	88	1	1	L	Charly	1968	1968
Flora Robson	F	1902	1984	82	1	0	S	Saratoga Trunk	1946	1946
May Robson	F	1858	1942	84	1	0	L	Lady for a Day	1933	1933
Sam Rockwell	M	1968	~	58	2	1	S	Three Billboards Outside Ebbing, Missouri	2017	2018
Ginger Rogers	F	1911	1995	83	1	1	L	Kitty Foyle	1940	1940
Howard Rollins	M	1950	1996	46	1	0	S	Ragtime	1981	1981
Saoirse Ronan	F	1994	~	32	4	0	3L:1S	Brooklyn	2007	2019
Mickey Rooney	M	1920	2014	93	4	0	2L:2S	Babes in Arms	1939	1979
Diana Ross	F	1944	~	82	1	0	L	Lady Sings the Blues	1972	1972
Katharine Ross	F	1940 *	~	86	1	0	S	The Graduate	1967	1967
Isabella Rossellini	F	1952	~	74	1	0	S	Conclave	2024	2024
Tim Roth	M	1961	~	65	1	0	S	Rob Roy	1995	1995
Mickey Rourke	M	1952	~	74	1	0	L	The Wrestler	2008	2008
Gena Rowlands	F	1930	2024	94	2	0	L	A Woman Under the Influence	1974	1980
Mercedes Ruehl	F	1948	~	78	1	1	S	The Fisher King	1991	1991
Mark Ruffalo	M	1967	~	58	4	0	S	The Kids Are All Right	2010	2023
Geoffrey Rush	M	1951	~	75	4	1	2L1:2S0	Shine	1996	2010
Harold Russell	M	1914	2002	88	1	1	S	The Best Years of Our Lives	1946	1946
Rosalind Russell	F	1907	1976	69	4	0	L	My Sister Eileen	1942	1958
Margaret Rutherford	F	1892	1972	80	1	1	S	The V.I.P.s	1963	1963
Amy Ryan	F	1969	~	56	1	0	S	Gone Baby Gone	2007	2007
Robert Ryan	M	1909	1973	63	1	0	S	Crossfire	1947	1947
Winona Ryder	F	1971	~	55	2	0	1L:1S	Little Women	1993	1994
Mark Rylance	M	1960	~	66	1	1	S	Bridge of Spies	2015	2015
Eva Marie Saint	F	1924	2026	102	1	1	S	On the Waterfront	1954	1954
Zoe Saldaña	F	1978	~	48	1	1	S	Emilia Pérez	2024	2024
George Sanders	M	1906	1972	65	1	1	S	All About Eve	1950	1950
Catalina Sandino Moreno	F	1981	~	45	1	0	L	Maria Full of Grace	2004	2004
Chris Sarandon	M	1942	~	84	1	0	S	Dog Day Afternoon	1975	1975
Susan Sarandon	F	1946	~	80	5	1	L	Dead Man Walking	1981	1995
Telly Savalas	M	1922	1994	72	1	0	S	Birdman of Alcatraz	1962	1962
Diana Scarwid	F	1955	~	71	1	0	S	Inside Moves	1980	1980
Roy Scheider	M	1932	2008	75	2	0	1L:1S	All That Jazz	1971	1979
Maximilian Schell	M	1930	2014	83	3	1	2L1:1S0	Judgment at Nuremberg	1961	1977
Joseph Schildkraut	M	1896	1964	67	1	1	S	The Life of Emile Zola	1937	1937
Paul Scofield	M	1922	2008	86	2	1	1L1:1S0	A Man for All Seasons	1966	1994
George C. Scott §	M	1927	1999	71	4	1 (Note: George C. Scott refused the award for Patton (1970).)	2L1:2S0	Patton	1959	1971
Martha Scott	F	1912	2003	90	1	0	L	Our Town	1940	1940
Kristin Scott Thomas	F	1960	~	66	1	0	L	The English Patient	1996	1996
George Segal	M	1934	2021	87	1	0	S	Who's Afraid of Virginia Woolf?	1966	1966
Peter Sellers	M	1925	1980	54	2	0	L	Dr. Strangelove	1964	1979
Chloë Sevigny	F	1974	~	52	1	0	S	Boys Don't Cry	1999	1999
Amanda Seyfried	F	1985	~	40	1	0	S	Mank	2020	2020
Michael Shannon	M	1974	~	52	2	0	S	Revolutionary Road	2008	2016
Omar Sharif	M	1932	2015	83	1	0	S	Lawrence of Arabia	1962	1962
Robert Shaw	M	1927	1978	51	1	0	S	A Man for All Seasons	1966	1966
Norma Shearer	F	1902	1983	80	5	1	L	The Divorcee	1930	1938
Sam Shepard	M	1943	2017	73	1	0	S	The Right Stuff	1983	1983
Talia Shire	F	1946	~	80	2	0	1L:1S	Rocky	1974	1976
Anne Shirley	F	1918	1993	75	1	0	S	Stella Dallas	1937	1937
Elisabeth Shue	F	1963	~	63	1	0	L	Leaving Las Vegas	1995	1995
Gabourey Sidibe	F	1983	~	43	1	0	L	Precious	2009	2009
Sylvia Sidney	F	1910	1999	88	1	0	S	Summer Wishes, Winter Dreams	1973	1973
Simone Signoret	F	1921	1985	64	2	1	L	Room at the Top	1959	1965
J. K. Simmons	M	1955	~	71	2	1	S	Whiplash	2014	2021
Jean Simmons	F	1929	2010	80	2	0	1L:1S	The Happy Ending	1948	1969
Frank Sinatra	M	1915	1998	82	2	1	1L0:1S1	From Here to Eternity	1953	1955
Gary Sinise	M	1955	~	71	1	0	S	Forrest Gump	1994	1994
Lilia Skala	F	1896	1994	98	1	0	S	Lilies of the Field	1963	1963
Stellan Skarsgård	M	1951	~	75	1	0	S	Sentimental Value	2025	2025
Kodi Smit-McPhee	M	1996	~	30	1	0	S	The Power of the Dog	2021	2021
Maggie Smith	F	1934	2024	89	6	2	2L1:4S1	The Prime of Miss Jean Brodie (Note: Maggie Smith also won Best Supporting Actress for California Suite (1978).)	1965	2001
Will Smith	M	1968	~	58	3	1	L	King Richard	2001	2021
Carrie Snodgress	F	1945	2004	58	1	0	L	Diary of a Mad Housewife	1970	1970
Gale Sondergaard	F	1899	1985	86	2	1	S	Anthony Adverse	1936	1946
Mira Sorvino	F	1967	~	59	1	1	S	Mighty Aphrodite	1995	1995
Ann Sothern	F	1909	2001	92	1	0	S	The Whales of August	1987	1987
Sissy Spacek	F	1949	~	76	6	1	L	Coal Miner's Daughter	1976	2001
Kevin Spacey	M	1959	~	67	2	2	1L1:1S1	American Beauty (Note: Kevin Spacey also won Best Supporting Actor for The Usual Suspects (1995).)	1995	1999
Octavia Spencer	F	1970	~	56	3	1	S	The Help	2011	2017
June Squibb	F	1929	~	97	1	0	S	Nebraska	2013	2013
Robert Stack	M	1919	2003	84	1	0	S	Written on the Wind	1956	1956
Sylvester Stallone	M	1946	~	80	2	0	1L:1S	Rocky	1976	2015
Terence Stamp	M	1938	2025	87	1	0	S	Billy Budd	1962	1962
Sebastian Stan	M	1982	~	44	1	0	L	The Apprentice	2024	2024
LaKeith Stanfield	M	1991	~	35	1	0	S	Judas and the Black Messiah	2020	2020
Kim Stanley	F	1925	2001	76	2	0	1L:1S	Séance on a Wet Afternoon	1964	1982
Barbara Stanwyck	F	1907	1990	82	4	0	L	Stella Dallas	1937	1948
Maureen Stapleton	F	1925	2006	80	4	1	S	Reds	1958	1981
Imelda Staunton	F	1956	~	70	1	0	L	Vera Drake	2004	2004
Mary Steenburgen	F	1953	~	73	1	1	S	Melvin and Howard	1980	1980
Rod Steiger	M	1925	2002	77	3	1	2L1:1S0	In the Heat of the Night	1954	1967
Hailee Steinfeld	F	1996	~	29	1	0	S	True Grit	2010	2010
James Stephenson	M	1889	1941	52	1	0	S	The Letter	1940	1940
Jan Sterling	F	1921	2004	82	1	0	S	The High and the Mighty	1954	1954
James Stewart	M	1908	1997	89	5	1	L	The Philadelphia Story	1939	1959
Kristen Stewart	F	1990	~	36	1	0	L	Spencer	2021	2021
Dean Stockwell	M	1936	2021	85	1	0	S	Married to the Mob	1988	1988
Emma Stone	F	1988	~	38	5	2	3L2:2S0	La La Land (Note: Emma Stone also won Best Actress for Poor Things (2023).)	2014	2025
Lewis Stone	M	1879	1953	73	1	0	L	The Patriot	1928	1928
Sharon Stone	F	1958	~	68	1	0	L	Casino	1995	1995
Beatrice Straight	F	1914	2001	86	1	1	S	Network	1976	1976
Lee Strasberg	M	1901	1982	80	1	0	S	The Godfather Part II	1974	1974
David Strathairn	M	1949	~	77	1	0	L	Good Night, and Good Luck	2005	2005
Robert Strauss	M	1913	1975	61	1	0	S	Stalag 17	1953	1953
Meryl Streep	F	1949	~	77	21	3	17L2:4S1	Sophie's Choice (Note: Meryl Streep also won Best Actress for The Iron Lady (2011) and Best Supporting Actress for Kramer vs. Kramer (1978).)	1978	2017
Barbra Streisand	F	1942	~	84	2	1	L	Funny Girl	1968	1973
Jeremy Strong	M	1978	~	47	1	0	S	The Apprentice	2024	2024
Gloria Stuart	F	1910	2010	100	1	0	S	Titanic	1997	1997
Margaret Sullavan	F	1909	1960	50	1	0	L	Three Comrades	1938	1938
Janet Suzman	F	1939	~	87	1	0	L	Nicholas and Alexandra	1971	1971
Hilary Swank	F	1974	~	52	2	2	L	Boys Don't Cry (Note: Hilary Swank also won Best Actress for Million Dollar Baby (2004).)	1999	2004
Gloria Swanson	F	1899	1983	84	3	0	L	Sadie Thompson	1928	1950
Tilda Swinton	F	1960	~	66	1	1	S	Michael Clayton	2007	2007
Russ Tamblyn	M	1934	~	91	1	0	S	Peyton Place	1957	1957
Akim Tamiroff	M	1899	1972	72	2	0	S	The General Died at Dawn	1936	1943
Jessica Tandy	F	1909	1994	85	2	1	1L1:1S0	Driving Miss Daisy	1989	1991
Elizabeth Taylor	F	1932	2011	79	5	2	L	BUtterfield 8 (Note: Elizabeth Taylor also won Best Actress for Who's Afraid of Virginia Woolf? (1966).)	1957	1966
Teyana Taylor	F	1990	~	35	1	0	S	One Battle After Another	2025	2025
Charlize Theron	F	1975	~	51	3	1	L	Monster	2003	2019
Emma Thompson	F	1959	~	67	4	1	3L1:1S0	Howards End (Note: Emma Thompson was nominated for two awards at the 1994 ceremony: Best Actress for The Remains of the Day (1993) and Best Supporting Actress for In the Name of the Father (1993), winning in neither category.)	1992	1995
Billy Bob Thornton	M	1955	~	71	2	0	1L:1S	Sling Blade	1996	1998
Uma Thurman	F	1970	~	56	1	0	S	Pulp Fiction	1994	1994
Lawrence Tibbett	M	1896	1960	63	1	0	L	The Rogue Song	1930	1930
Gene Tierney	F	1920	1991	70	1	0	L	Leave Her to Heaven	1945	1945
Jennifer Tilly	F	1958	~	68	1	0	S	Bullets Over Broadway	1994	1994
Meg Tilly	F	1960	~	66	1	0	S	Agnes of God	1985	1985
Richard Todd	M	1919	2009	90	1	0	L	The Hasty Heart	1949	1949
Marisa Tomei	F	1964	~	61	3	1	S	My Cousin Vinny	1992	2008
Lily Tomlin	F	1939	~	87	1	0	S	Nashville	1975	1975
Franchot Tone	M	1905	1968	63	1	0	L	Mutiny on the Bounty	1935	1935
Topol	M	1935	2023	87	1	0	L	Fiddler on the Roof	1971	1971
Rip Torn	M	1931	2019	88	1	0	S	Cross Creek	1983	1983
Fernanda Torres	F	1965	~	61	1	0	L	I'm Still Here	2024	2024
Lee Tracy	M	1898	1968	70	1	0	S	The Best Man	1964	1964
Spencer Tracy	M	1900	1967	67	9	2	L	Captains Courageous (Note: Spencer Tracy also won Best Actor for Boys Town (1938).)	1936	1967
Henry Travers	M	1874	1965	91	1	0	S	Mrs. Miniver	1942	1942
John Travolta	M	1954	~	72	2	0	L	Saturday Night Fever	1977	1994
Claire Trevor	F	1910	2000	90	3	1	S	Key Largo	1937	1954
Massimo Troisi	M	1953	1994	41	1	0	L	Il Postino: The Postman	1995	1995
Stanley Tucci	M	1960	~	66	1	0	S	The Lovely Bones	2009	2009
Tom Tully	M	1908	1982	73	1	0	S	The Caine Mutiny	1954	1954
Kathleen Turner	F	1954	~	72	1	0	L	Peggy Sue Got Married	1986	1986
Lana Turner	F	1921	1995	74	1	0	L	Peyton Place	1957	1957
Susan Tyrrell	F	1945	2012	67	1	0	S	Fat City	1972	1972
Cicely Tyson	F	1924	2021	96	1	0	L	Sounder	1972	1972
Liv Ullmann	F	1938	~	87	2	0	L	The Emigrants	1972	1976
Miyoshi Umeki	F	1929	2007	78	1	1	S	Sayonara	1957	1957
Mary Ure	F	1933	1975	42	1	0	S	Sons and Lovers	1960	1960
Peter Ustinov	M	1921	2004	82	3	2	S	Spartacus (Note: Peter Ustinov also won Best Supporting Actor for Topkapi (1964).)	1951	1964
Brenda Vaccaro	F	1939	~	87	1	0	S	Once Is Not Enough	1975	1975
Jo Van Fleet	F	1915	1996	80	1	1	S	East of Eden	1955	1955
Diane Varsi	F	1938	1992	54	1	0	S	Peyton Place	1957	1957
Robert Vaughn	M	1932	2016	83	1	0	S	The Young Philadelphians	1959	1959
Alicia Vikander	F	1988	~	38	1	1	S	The Danish Girl	2015	2015
Jon Voight	M	1938	~	87	4	1	3L1:1S0	Coming Home	1969	2001
Erich von Stroheim	M	1885	1957	71	1	0	S	Sunset Boulevard	1950	1950
Max von Sydow	M	1929	2020	90	2	0	1L:1S	Pelle the Conqueror	1988	2011
Mark Wahlberg	M	1971	~	55	1	0	S	The Departed	2006	2006
Christopher Walken	M	1943	~	83	2	1	S	The Deer Hunter	1978	2002
Quvenzhané Wallis	F	2003	~	23	1	0	L	Beasts of the Southern Wild	2012	2012
Julie Walters	F	1950	~	76	2	0	1L:1S	Educating Rita	1983	2000
Christoph Waltz	M	1956	~	70	2	2	S	Inglourious Basterds (Note: Christoph Waltz also won Best Supporting Actor for Django Unchained (2012).)	2009	2012
Jack Warden	M	1920	2006	85	2	0	S	Shampoo	1975	1978
H. B. Warner	M	1875	1958	83	1	0	S	Lost Horizon	1937	1937
Lesley Ann Warren	F	1946	~	80	1	0	S	Victor/Victoria	1982	1982
Denzel Washington	M	1954	~	71	9	2	7L1:2S1	Training Day (Note: Denzel Washington also won Best Supporting Actor for Glory (1989).)	1987	2021
Ken Watanabe	M	1959	~	67	1	0	S	The Last Samurai	2003	2003
Ethel Waters	F	1896	1977	80	1	0	S	Pinky	1949	1949
Sam Waterston	M	1940	~	86	1	0	L	The Killing Fields	1984	1984
Emily Watson	F	1967	~	59	2	0	L	Breaking the Waves	1996	1998
Lucile Watson	F	1879	1962	83	1	0	S	Watch on the Rhine	1943	1943
Naomi Watts	F	1968	~	58	2	0	L	21 Grams	2003	2012
John Wayne	M	1907	1979	72	2	1	L	True Grit	1949	1969
Jacki Weaver	F	1947	~	79	2	0	S	Animal Kingdom	2010	2012
Sigourney Weaver	F	1949	~	77	3	0	2L:1S	Aliens (Note: Sigourney Weaver was nominated for two awards at the 1989 ceremony: Best Actress for Gorillas in the Mist (1988) and Best Supporting Actress for Working Girl (1988), winning in neither category.)	1986	1988
Clifton Webb	M	1889	1966	76	3	0	1L:2S	Sitting Pretty	1944	1948
Rachel Weisz	F	1970 *	~	56	2	1	S	The Constant Gardener	2005	2018
Tuesday Weld	F	1943	~	83	1	0	S	Looking for Mr. Goodbar	1977	1977
Orson Welles	M	1915	1985	70	1	0	L	Citizen Kane	1941	1941
Oskar Werner	M	1922	1984	61	1	0	L	Ship of Fools	1965	1965
Forest Whitaker	M	1961	~	65	1	1	L	The Last King of Scotland	2006	2006
Stuart Whitman	M	1928	2020	92	1	0	L	The Mark	1961	1961
James Whitmore	M	1921	2009	87	2	0	1L:1S	Give 'em Hell, Harry!	1949	1975
May Whitty	F	1865	1948	82	2	0	S	Night Must Fall	1937	1942
Richard Widmark	M	1914	2008	93	1	0	S	Kiss of Death	1947	1947
Dianne Wiest	F	1948	~	78	3	2	S	Hannah and Her Sisters (Note: Dianne Wiest also won Best Supporting Actress for Bullets Over Broadway (1994).)	1986	1994
Jack Wild	M	1952	2006	53	1	0	S	Oliver!	1968	1968
Cornel Wilde	M	1912	1989	77	1	0	L	A Song to Remember	1945	1945
Gene Wilder	M	1933	2016	83	1	0	S	The Producers	1968	1968
Tom Wilkinson	M	1948	2023	75	2	0	1L:1S	In the Bedroom	2001	2007
Cara Williams	F	1925	2021	96	1	0	S	The Defiant Ones	1958	1958
Michelle Williams	F	1980	~	46	5	0	3L:2S	Blue Valentine	2005	2022
Robin Williams	M	1951	2014	63	4	1	3L0:1S1	Good Will Hunting	1987	1997
Chill Wills	M	1902	1978	76	1	0	S	The Alamo	1960	1960
Paul Winfield	M	1939	2004	64	1	0	L	Sounder	1972	1972
Oprah Winfrey	F	1954	~	72	1	0	S	The Color Purple	1985	1985
Debra Winger	F	1955	~	71	3	0	L	An Officer and a Gentleman	1982	1993
Mare Winningham	F	1959	~	67	1	0	S	Georgia	1995	1995
Kate Winslet	F	1975	~	51	7	1	4L1:3S0	The Reader	1995	2015
Shelley Winters	F	1920	2006	85	4	2	1L0:3S2	The Diary of Anne Frank (Note: Shelley Winters also won Best Supporting Actress for A Patch of Blue (1965).)	1951	1972
Reese Witherspoon	F	1976	~	50	2	1	L	Walk the Line	2005	2014
Natalie Wood	F	1938	1981	43	3	0	2L:1S	Splendor in the Grass	1955	1963
Peggy Wood	F	1892	1978	86	1	0	S	The Sound of Music	1965	1965
Alfre Woodard	F	1952	~	74	1	0	S	Cross Creek	1983	1983
James Woods	M	1947	~	79	2	0	1L:1S	Salvador	1986	1996
Joanne Woodward	F	1930	~	96	4	1	L	The Three Faces of Eve	1957	1990
Monty Woolley	M	1888	1963	74	2	0	1L:1S	The Pied Piper	1942	1944
Jeffrey Wright	M	1965	~	60	1	0	L	American Fiction	2023	2023
Teresa Wright	F	1918	2005	86	3	1	1L0:2S1	Mrs. Miniver (Note: Teresa Wright was nominated for two awards at the 1943 ceremony: Best Actress for The Pride of the Yankees (1942) and Best Supporting Actress for Mrs. Miniver (1942), winning in the supporting actress category.)	1941	1942
Margaret Wycherly	F	1881	1956	74	1	0	S	Sergeant York	1941	1941
Jane Wyman	F	1917	2007	90	4	1	L	Johnny Belinda	1946	1954
Ed Wynn	M	1886	1966	79	1	0	S	The Diary of Anne Frank	1959	1959
Diana Wynyard	F	1906	1964	58	1	0	L	Cavalcade	1933	1933
Michelle Yeoh	F	1962	~	64	1	1	L	Everything Everywhere All at Once	2022	2022
Steven Yeun	M	1983	~	42	1	0	L	Minari	2020	2020
Susannah York	F	1939	2011	72	1	0	S	They Shoot Horses, Don't They?	1969	1969
Youn Yuh-jung	F	1947	~	79	1	1	S	Minari	2020	2020
Burt Young	M	1940	2023	83	1	0	S	Rocky	1976	1976
Gig Young	M	1913	1978	64	3	1	S	They Shoot Horses, Don't They?	1951	1969
Loretta Young	F	1913	2000	87	2	1	L	The Farmer's Daughter	1947	1949
Roland Young	M	1887	1953	65	1	0	S	Topper	1937	1937
Renée Zellweger	F	1969	~	57	4	2	3L1:1S1	Judy (Note: Renée Zellweger also won Best Supporting Actress for Cold Mountain (2003).)	2001	2019
Catherine Zeta-Jones	F	1969	~	57	1	1	S	Chicago	2002	2002

== See also ==
- Best Actor
- Best Actress
- Best Supporting Actor
- Best Supporting Actress
- List of Academy Award records
- List of superlative Academy Award winners and nominees
- List of films with all four Academy Award acting nominations
- List of actors with two or more Academy Awards in acting categories
- List of actors with more than one Academy Award nomination in the acting categories
- List of actors nominated for multiple Academy Awards in the same year
- List of oldest and youngest Academy Award winners and nominees

== Notes ==
Actors with multiple nominations at a single ceremony:

Additional winning roles:

Other:

== Bibliography ==
- Levy, Emanuel (2003), All About Oscar: The History and Politics of the Academy Awards, New York, United States: Continuum International Publishing Group, ISBN 978-0-82641-452-6
- Wiley, Mason; Bona, Damien (1996), Inside Oscar: The Unofficial History of the Academy Awards (5 ed.), New York, United States: Ballantine Books, ISBN 978-0-34540-053-6, OCLC 779680732
