= Miracle in the Rain =

1943 novella by Ben Hecht

- First edition cover
- Author: Ben Hecht
- Language: English
- Genre: Romance
- Publisher: Alfred A. Knopf
- Publication date: 1943
- Publication place: United States
- Pages: 52 pages
- OCLC: 01747800

Miracle in the Rain is a United States home front during World War II-themed novella by screenwriter Ben Hecht, first published in the April 3, 1943 issue of The Saturday Evening Post weekly magazine. By October 1943, the story was reissued into a novella. 13 years later, the novella was adapted into multiple live television productions (in 1947, 1949, 1950, and 1953), which reduced the story to plot essentials. It was then adapted into a Warner Bros. feature film released in 1956, with Hecht writing the script adaptation.

== Synopsis ==
Ruth Wood, a lonely secretary who works in New York City, lives with her psychotic mother who hasn't spoken a word since the death of her husband. During one rainy day, she is greeted by Arthur Hugenon, who is enlisted as a private. He helps carry her groceries back home, and insists on accompanying her for dinner. Before long, Ruth falls in love with Arthur and her life blossoms. Later on, Arthur leaves for active service overseas. Every night, Ruth writes to him but does not hear back. She eventually learns that Arthur has been killed in combat. Ruth falls into a deep depression. Bedridden with pneumonia, Ruth persists in venturing outside on a rainy night to St. Patrick's Cathedral. On the cathedral steps, Ruth sees a manifestation of Arthur and the two embrace for the last time.

== Adaptations ==
=== NBC Television Theater (1947) ===
During the late 1940s and early 1950s, at the start of a period in American TV which was subsequently characterized as the Golden Age of Television or, more precisely, "Golden Age of Live TV Drama", four anthology drama showcases used varying time formats to broadcast adaptations of Miracle in the Rain. The first of these aired during NBC's 1946–1947 season, an early period of irregular programming, nearly two years before the start of network TV's first full-schedule season in October 1948. Beginning in January 1946, NBC had been presenting on Sunday evenings, between 8:30 and 9:30 or between 9 and 10, a series of live dramas under the umbrella title of Broadway Previews (later changed to NBC Television Theater).

On Sunday, February 23, 1947, from 9:05 to 9:50, presentation records indicate a sponsored (by Borden) production of Ben Hecht's Miracle in the Rain, adapted by NBC's resident director and head of the network's drama division, Fred Coe. The records are missing details regarding members of the cast or whether Coe also directed the episode.

=== Chevrolet on Broadway (1949) ===
The second presentation of the story aired as the February 14, 1949 episode of NBC's 30-minute weekly live drama series, Chevrolet Tele-Theater which, during its earliest months, was titled Chevrolet on Broadway. Presented on a high budget by the automaker, the show's productions tended to use established Hollywood talent which was more expensive than lesser-known actors from the New York stage. Reducing the plot to its core elements, the twenty-six-minute Valentine's Day encapsulation of the original novella starred, as Ruth, Mary Anderson who, in the previous five years, had played the female lead or second lead in six major studio films, including 1944's Lifeboat and Wilson, 1946's To Each His Own and 1947's Whispering City.

Art was portrayed, in his TV debut, by John Dall who, a few months earlier, in 1948, had co-starred as one of the two Leopold and Loeb-like thrill killers in Alfred Hitchcock's first Technicolor film, Rope and, two years before that, at the 18th Academy Awards, was one of the nominees for Best Supporting Actor as a result of his first film role, playing a young Welsh coal miner given a chance for a better life in 1945's The Corn Is Green. The episode was produced by former actor Owen Davis, Jr. (who drowned in a boating accident three months later, on May 21), directed by Gordon Duff and adapted by The Corn Is Green playwright Emlyn Williams. NBC's records indicate that despite the brevity of the adaptation, the storyline included three other cast members, Viola Frayne, Lee Harris and Jesse White, but the identities of their characters were not specified.

=== Studio One (1950) ===
The following year, Westinghouse Studio One, which started, in 1948, as CBS' first regularly scheduled weekly anthology drama series and, unlike Chevrolet Tele-Theater, had an hour-long time slot, presented its adaptation (by David Shaw) on May 1, 1950. Directed by Franklin Schaffner, whose helming of Patton, twenty years later, would win him an Academy Award for Best Director, the live production starred Jeffrey Lynn as Art Hugenon. In the three years between his film debut in 1938 and the start of his World War II service in 1941, Lynn played leads and second leads in eighteen films and was touted by his studio, Warner Bros., as a potential top star of the future. However, upon returning to the screen after a seven-year absence, he found that his initial six films in the 1948–50 period, including the acclaimed A Letter to Three Wives, did not restore his career as leading man and he turned to television, making his small-screen debut with Miracle in the Rain.

The role of Ruth Wood was given to Joy Geffen, a New York stage actress with a number of undocumented appearances during TV's earliest days and at least six confirmed roles in live dramas airing between 1949 and 1953; The on-screen credits also list Catherine Squire as Mrs. Wood and Eleanor Wilson as Flora Ullman, a name that deviated from the 1956 film's "Grace Ullman". Announcer Paul Brinson states that "others in the cast of 'Miracle in the Rain' were Howard Caine [auctioneer selling the Roman coin], Cyrus Steele [restaurant maitre d'], Julian Noa [doctor attending to Ruth] and Carl Dodd".

=== Tales of the City (1953) ===
Just over three years later, on August 20, 1953, another production of the story, once again pared down to a half-hour, was presented by a live drama showcase based on the stories of the novella's original author. A seven-episode CBS summer series, referenced as Tales of the City, but bearing the official title, Willys Theatre Presenting Ben Hecht's Tales of the City, used Hecht as the unseen narrator, setting the scenes at the opening of his stories, filling in gaps, and offering closing comments. Miracle in the Rain, the fifth episode, adapted, as were all the others, by Hecht, and directed by Robert Stevens, starred, as Art and Ruth, two familiar TV faces, William Prince and Phyllis Thaxter.

Prince, who served in World War II, and briefly appeared as a serviceman in one of 1944's highest-grossing films, the wartime morale booster Hollywood Canteen, played second and third leads in seven additional films made between 1943 and 1950, with the last of these giving him the third-billed role of Cyrano's friend Christian de Neuvillette in José Ferrer's Oscar-winning portrayal of Cyrano de Bergerac, and then devoted his career primarily to television and theater. Likewise, Phyllis Thaxter, at the start of a long TV career, after playing a couple of minor leads and several second and third leads in seventeen films produced between 1944 and 1952, made her first small-screen appearance in this twenty-six-minute miniaturization of Miracle in the Rain, which also included Una Merkel as Ruth's mother and Mildred Dunnock as Grace.

=== 1956 film ===
A film adaptation starring Jane Wyman and Van Johnson, and directed by Rudolph Maté, was released in 1956 by Warner Bros. Hecht wrote the script adaptation of his novella.
