= Something in the Wind =

1947 film by Irving Pichel

- Theatrical release poster
- Directed by: Irving Pichel
- Screenplay by: Harry Kurnitz; William Bowers
- Story by: Fritz Rotter; Charles O'Neal
- Produced by: Joseph Sistrom
- Starring: Deanna Durbin; Donald O'Connor; John Dall
- Cinematography: Milton R. Krasner
- Edited by: Otto Ludwig
- Production company: Universal Pictures
- Distributed by: Universal Pictures
- Release date: July 21, 1947 (US)
- Running time: 94 minutes
- Country: United States
- Language: English

Something in the Wind is a 1947 American musical comedy film directed by Irving Pichel and starring Deanna Durbin, Donald O'Connor, and John Dall.

Durbin's third husband Charles David said she "hated" making her last three films and that she would watch all her old movies except those three.

== Plot ==
The film is about the grandson of a recently deceased millionaire who mistakes a beautiful female disc jockey for her aunt, who once dated his grandfather. It was O'Connor's first film after he returned from military service in World War II. The film includes the famous "I Love a Mystery" number performed by O'Connor.

== Cast ==
- Deanna Durbin as Mary Collins
- Donald O'Connor as Charlie Read
- John Dall as Donald Read
- Charles Winninger as Uncle Chester Read
- Helena Carter as Clarissa Prentice
- Margaret Wycherly as Grandma Read
- Jean Adair as Aunt Mary Collins
- The Williams Brothers as Singing Quartet
- Jacqueline deWit as Fashion Show Saleslady
- Jan Peerce as Tony, the Policeman
- Bess Flowers as Woman in Audience (uncredited)
- Andy Williams as himself (uncredited)

== Production ==
The film was based on an original story by Fritz Rotter and Charles O'Neal called For the Love of Mary. Universal bought it in August 1946 and William Bowers did the script. In December the studio announced it as Deanna Durbin's next vehicle. Irving Pichel would direct for producer Joseph Sistrom. Filming was to begin in January - the film substituted Up in Central Park in Durbin's schedule because the latter required color and there was a delay with the Technicolor lab. In January John Dall and Donald O'Connor were cast. It was O'Connor's first film after he got out of the army. Filming started February 1947. It was the second film for Helena Carter.

In April 1947 the film was retitled Something in the Wind.

== Reception ==
Filmink called it "probably Durbin’s worst movie and Dall very uncomfortable in his role – it’s only worth seeing for Durbin completists and the performance of Donald O’Connor."
