= John Dall =

American actor (1920–1971)

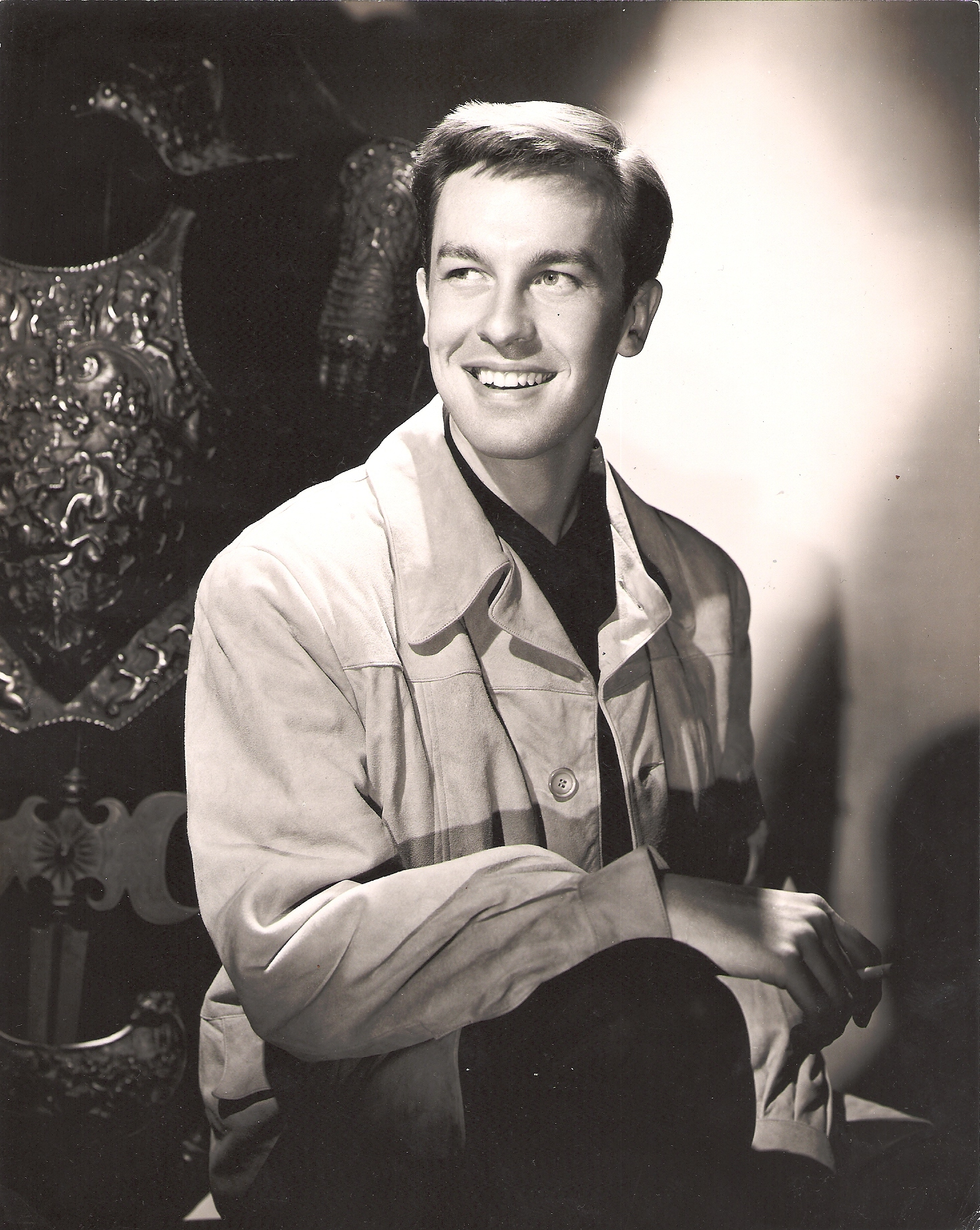
- Dall in 1948
- Born: John Dall Thompson; May 26, 1920 (Note: While some sources cite Dall's year of birth as 1918, the date of 1920 is supported by the majority of sources, including published obituaries, ship manifests, and social security/death records. The John D. Thompson recorded in New York City's birth indexes as having been born in Manhattan on May 26, 1920 is likely to be Dall. Dall's name does not appear alongside his parents and elder brother in the United States Census conducted in January 1920, casting further doubt on a 1918 birthdate.); New York City, U.S.
- Died: January 15, 1971 (aged 50); Beverly Hills, California, U.S.
- Occupation: Actor
- Years active: 1941–1965

John Dall (born John Dall Thompson; May 26, 1920 – January 15, 1971) was an American actor. Primarily a stage actor, he is best remembered today for portraying the cool-minded intellectual killer in Alfred Hitchcock's Rope (1948), and the companion of trigger-happy femme fatale Peggy Cummins in the 1950 film noir Gun Crazy. He also had a substantial role in Stanley Kubrick's Spartacus (1960). He first came to fame as the young Welsh mining prodigy who comes alive under the tutelage of Bette Davis in The Corn Is Green (1945), for which he was nominated for the Academy Award for Best Supporting Actor.

== Early life ==
Dall, who used his middle name for his acting career, was born in New York City on May 26, 1920, the younger son of Charles Jenner Thompson and his wife, Henry (née Worthington). (Sources which cite Dall's birth name as John Jenner Thompson and his birth year as 1918 appear to be in error.) His father was a civil engineer. His elder brother, Worthington Thompson, was later a decorated lieutenant in the 517th Parachute Regimental Combat Team.

In the 1920s, the Thompsons moved to Panama, where Charles worked on the construction of the airport there. While in Panama, Dall was in a theater when a cast member fell ill and Dall stepped in; this inspired his desire to act. His father committed suicide in 1929, and his widow returned to New York City with John the following year. (Note: Dall later claimed in media interviews to have acted on stage in Panama as a teenager with his parents in the audience, but sources indicate he had returned to the US at the age of 10.)

Dall attended Horace Mann School and briefly enrolled at Columbia University, where he intended to follow in his father's footsteps by studying engineering. Deciding that acting was his true vocation, he left Columbia and studied at the Theodora Irvine School of Theater and the Pasadena Playhouse. He also studied at the Petit Theatre in New Orleans.

== Career ==
=== Theater ===
Dall spent six years acting in various stock companies, notably Clare Tree Major's Children's Theatre. He also worked in companies headed by Aline MacMahon, Arthur Byron, and Edith Atwater, among others.

Dall had small roles on Broadway during the 1941–42 season in R.U.R. and Janie. In 1942–43, he played the lead of Quizz Martin in the touring company The Eve of St Mark. He was well received and replaced William Prince on Broadway so Prince could take a vacation. His performance was spotted by Jack Warner's wife and resulted in a Warner's screen test for Dall. Warner Bros. offered him a contract but he would only take it if he could have time off to do a play. (Warners also signed Prince.)

=== The Corn Is Green ===
Dall made his film debut in The Corn Is Green (1945), under the direction of Irving Rapper. Richard Waring was originally slated to play the role, but had been called into the army. The film was shot in the middle of 1944. Warners were impressed with the rushes and signed Dall to a new contract.

=== Dear Ruth ===
Dall returned to the stage to play the lead in Norman Krasna's Dear Ruth (1944), under the direction of Moss Hart. It was a huge success. The New York Times said Dall gives "a graceful and easy performance". Even before The Corn Is Green was released Warners announced Dall was one of six contractees they intended to build into a star (the others were Lauren Bacall, Dane Clark, Faye Emerson, Robert Hutton and William Prince.) After The Corn Is Green was released, Dall received an Oscar nomination for Best Supporting Actor. He was called one of the "hottest finds" in Hollywood, and Warners tried to find a film for him and co-star Joan Lorring.

The film rights to Dear Ruth were sold to Paramount who cast William Holden in the part originated by Dall. Warners brought the screen rights to John Patrick's play The Hasty Heart and announced Dall would play the role originated by Richard Basehart. Warners gave Dall three months leave to perform The Hasty Heart (1945) on stage on the road. However the film was not made for several more years by which time Richard Todd had been cast in the role.

In May 1946, Warners released Dall from his contract. He only made one film for the studio.

=== Universal ===
Paramount announced they were interested in signing Dall and Edward G. Robinson for a role in an adaptation of The Wayfarers. In May 1946 he signed a seven-year deal with David O. Selznick's Vanguard Films. Dall performed Hasty Heart in summer stock.

Dall wound up making no films for Selznick. Instead he went over to Universal, where he signed a contract. He played Deanna Durbin's love interest in Something in the Wind (1947); the Los Angeles Times described him as "ill at ease". He was in Another Part of the Forest (1948), based on the play by Lillian Hellman.

=== Rope and Gun Crazy ===
Alfred Hitchcock cast Dall in Rope (1948) as one of the Leopold and Loeb-like thrill killers (the other played by Farley Granger) who match wits with James Stewart. The film was not a big hit on release but its reputation has since grown.

After Rope it was reported he would make Shadow of Fear for Michael Curtiz but this did not materialize.

Dall did "The Wind and the Rain" for Theatre Guild on the Air then returned to Broadway to appear in Daniel Taradash's adaptation of Jean-Paul Sartre's Red Gloves with Charles Boyer, directed by Jed Harris. It was a minor hit. Brooks Atkinson said Boyer and Dall's acting were the best thing about the production.

Dall made his TV debut in "Miracle in the Rain" for The Chevrolet Tele-Theatre in 1949. He appeared as one of the leads in Gun Crazy (1950) opposite Irish actress Peggy Cummins.

Dall had a supporting role in The Man Who Cheated Himself (1950). He was in the short-run revival of The Heiress (1950) on Broadway with Basil Rathbone.

=== Television and stage ===
In October 1950 Dall said that TV acting was better done by movie actors, who understood technique, than stage actors, who needed audience response.

In late 1950, he appeared in The Man by Mel Dinelli on stage in Los Angeles with Gladys George. The Los Angeles Times said he played his role with "tremendous assurance".

In stock he appeared in The Hasty Heart (1952), Gramercy Ghost (1952), The Moon is Blue (1953), The Man Who Came to Dinner, and Born Yesterday (1953).

Dall did much work in television, appearing in guest roles on such shows as Lights Out ("Pit of the Dead"), The Clock ("A Right Smart Trick"), Studio One in Hollywood ("The Doctor's Wife"), Broadway Television Theatre ("Outward Bound", "The Hasty Heart"), Suspense ("The Invisible Killer", "The Tenth Reunion"), General Electric Theatre ("The Coward of Fort Bennett") and Schlitz Playhouse ("And Practically Strangers"). Other theatre performances in stock included The Male Animal (1954).

Dall returned to Broadway for Leslie Stevens's Champagne Complex, which had a short run in 1955.

=== Later career ===
Dall's first film in eight years was Spartacus (1960), where he played a Roman soldier based on Gaius Claudius Glaber. He was the villain in MGM's Atlantis, the Lost Continent (1961), his final theatrical feature.

Dall guest-starred in four episodes of TV's Perry Mason, including playing murder victim Edward Franklin in the 1962 episode "The Case of the Weary Watchdog" and murder victim Colin Durant in the 1963 episode "The Case of the Reluctant Model".

== Personal life ==
Film historians William J. Mann and Karen Burroughs Hannsberry have remarked that Dall was gay but claimed in media interviews to have had a brief marriage in the early 1940s. No marriage certificate has come to light, and his death certificate records him as "never married". At a studio request, Hedda Hopper once linked his name with Jane Withers romantically. According to music journalist Phil Milstein, at the time of his death Dall had lapsed into alcoholism and was living with his partner, actor Clement Brace (died 1996).

== Death ==
Dall sustained a serious fall while visiting London in October 1970 and died of cardiac arrest, a complication of myocarditis, at his home in Beverly Hills, California, on January 15, 1971, aged 50. His body was donated to medical science. (Note: Online sources attributing Dall's death to a "punctured lung" may be a garbled reference to his accident in London.)

Dall's papers are held at the Margaret Herrick Library in Beverly Hills, California.

Filmink magazine argued "Dall never got his due, it would seem, despite a strong career that included Rope and at least two other classic movies and an Oscar nomination... One can’t help but feel, however, that he could and should have done more. Because he was a hugely talented man."

== Filmography ==
Year	Title	Role	Notes
1945	The Corn Is Green	Morgan Evans	
1947	Something in the Wind	Donald Read	
1948	Another Part of the Forest	John Bagtry	
1948	Rope	Brandon Shaw	
1950	Gun Crazy	Bart Tare	
1950	The Man Who Cheated Himself	Andy Cullen	
1960	Spartacus	Marcus Glabrus	
1961	Atlantis, the Lost Continent	Zaren	

=== Television ===
Year	TV show	Role	Episode
1949	The Chevrolet Tele-Theatre		"Miracle in the Rain"
1951	Lights Out		"Pit of the Dead"
1951	The Clock		"A Right Smart Trick"
1952	Studio One		"The Doctor's Wife"
1952	Suspense	Jim	"The Invisible Killer"
1952	Broadway Television Theatre	Henry	"Outward Bound"
1953	Broadway Television Theatre		"The Hasty Heart"
1954	Suspense	Jim	"The Tenth Reunion"
1958	General Electric Theater	Lt. Reese	"The Coward of Fort Bennett"
1959	Schlitz Playhouse	Hugh Mitchell	"And Practically Strangers"
1962	Perry Mason	Julian Kirk	"The Case of the Lonely Eloper"
1962	Perry Mason	Edward Franklin	"The Case of the Weary Watchdog"
1963	Perry Mason	Colin Durant	"The Case of the Reluctant Model"
1965	Perry Mason	Roan Daniel	Episode – "The Case of the Laughing Lady", (final appearance)

== Radio credits ==
Year	Program	Episode/source
1953	Theatre Guild on the Air	Quiet Wedding

== Discography ==
Year	Album	Credits	Label	Notes
1949	This Is My Beloved	Narrator	Atlantic Records	Walter Benton's poems set to music by Vernon Duke
