= The Corn Is Green (1945 film) =

1945 film by Irving Rapper

- Theatrical release poster
- Directed by: Irving Rapper
- Written by: Frank Cavett; Casey Robinson
- Based on: The Corn Is Green; 1938 play by Emlyn Williams
- Produced by: Jack Chertok
- Starring: Bette Davis; Nigel Bruce; John Dall
- Cinematography: Sol Polito
- Edited by: Frederick Richards
- Music by: Max Steiner
- Distributed by: Warner Bros. Pictures
- Release date: July 14, 1945
- Running time: 115 minutes
- Country: United States
- Language: English
- Budget: $1,545,000
- Box office: $3,649,000

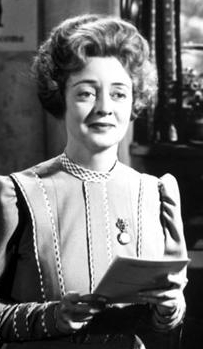
Bette Davis as Miss Moffat

The Corn Is Green is a 1945 American drama film starring Bette Davis as a schoolteacher determined to bring education to a Welsh coal mining town despite great opposition. It was adapted from the 1938 play of the same name by Emlyn Williams, which originally starred Ethel Barrymore.

John Dall and Joan Lorring were nominated for the Oscar for Best Supporting Actor and Best Supporting Actress, respectively.

In 1979, the play was adapted once again, for the made-for-television film The Corn Is Green starring Katharine Hepburn.

== Plot ==
In 1895, L.C. (Lily Cristobel) Moffat, M.A, comes to a Welsh coal mining area, to the village of Glansarno (English spelling). She is determined to set up a school to serve the boys who go by singing on their way home from work. (They go into the mine at age 12.) She gets off on the wrong foot with the local squire, ensuring his resistance to and obstruction of her efforts. She enlists the help of Mr. Jones and Miss Ronberry, and plans to buy a nearby barn and turn it into a schoolhouse. She meets so much resistance that eventually, she considers giving up. Then she discovers a promising student, Morgan Evans, a miner seemingly destined for a life of hard work and heavy drink. She is captivated by an essay he writes that begins “If a light come into the mine...” With renewed hope, she works hard to help him realize his potential and opens her home to give lessons to people of all ages.

Miss Moffat brings with her her housekeeper, Mrs. Watty and Watty's illegitimate daughter Bessie, who is in her early teens. Bessie is a vain, selfish, discontented, lascivious liar, and she only gets worse as time passes. One day she throws a tantrum when she is told she cannot go to the fair, and Miss Moffat locks her in her room, promising to send her out to work the next day, since she finds school so boring. That night, Bessie sneaks out the window to waylay Morgan as he leaves the house. He is drunk and has just had a huge row with Miss Moffat, rebelling at the constant control and the humiliation from those who call him “the teacher’s little dog.” Bessie sings a sweet-sounding but bawdy Welsh song to him, and they fall into each other's arms.

Miss Moffat brings the Squire around by skillfully playing on his vanity, suggesting that if the Earl of Southampton can patronize a Shakespeare, he can support a Morgan Evans. He agrees to vouch for Morgan with the University of Oxford, a condition that must be met before the university will consider Morgan's application.

Morgan and Miss Moffat are reconciled, and they continue their studies. In order to teach him Greek, she must learn it herself and, as she says, stay at least a day ahead of him. Three months pass, and it is time for the written examination for Oxford. Morgan's friends — who teased him unmercifully in the beginning — come for him, singing, and bring him to Miss Moffat's, where the Squire will invigilate. If he succeeds with the written examination, Morgan will go to Oxford for an interview.

Then Bessie walks through the door. She tells Miss Moffat that she is pregnant with Morgan's child. Miss Moffat tells her that nothing must interfere with the examination. They will talk later—and Bessie is to tell no one, not even her mother. When Bessie resists, Miss Moffat calmly tells her that she is in such a nervous state that if she were to strike Bessie she would probably kill her. Bessie believes her and goes off to the kitchen. The Squire arrives, and Mr. Jones and Miss Ronberry wish Morgan good luck. The test begins.

It is winter. The Squire is fully involved with the expanded school, saying that it is quite a thrill “watching these eager little beggars soaking up education.” According to Miss Ronberry, there are rumors in the village about Bessie. Miss Moffat says she is still in Cheltenham. The audience sees that Moffat has been sending Bessie checks and telling her Morgan has been drinking heavily.

Morgan is returning from the interview at Oxford and everyone—teachers, students, the Squire are eagerly waiting, many of them at the train station. But the last train from London arrives, and Morgan isn't on it. In fact, he has taken an earlier train and walked from the stop before Glansarno to Miss Moffat's house. He wants to see her first. He tells her about his time at Oxford. He is ecstatic. The Squire, Mr Jones and Miss Ronberry all come in and receive the same news: the results will arrive by post in two days. Mr. Jones goes to light the lamp in the window and sees a cart pull up. It is Bessie, decked in a white fur cape and glittering jewelry, heavily made up and looking jaded and older than her years.

Mr. Jones sends Morgan to the kitchen to get something to eat before she comes in. Miss Moffat goes with him. it turns out that Bessie read about the scholarship in the MidWales Gazette. Her mother comes out of the kitchen, followed by Miss Moffat. Watty is pleased at the news that she has just become a grandmother until she realizes that the baby is Morgan's.

Mr. Jones suddenly offers to marry Bessie, but she can't because her boyfriend Alf wouldn't like it. Alf doesn't want the baby, nor does Bessie. She admits that if Morgan marries her, she'll leave him with the baby, eventually. Watty suggests that Miss Moffat adopt the child. She resists on the grounds that she knows nothing about babies. But Bessie thinks this a perfect solution, and pressures Miss Moffat by suggesting that it might grow up to be like its father. She promises that Morgan will never know. But after Bessie leaves, Morgan bursts in. The Squire has told him. Then the Postmistress comes in with a telegram. Morgan has won the scholarship, placing first. The Postmistress and Mr. Jones leave to spread the news.

Through a heartfelt and persuasive conversation, Moffat convinces him to continue his higher education. She made out to the Squire that he might become a writer, but she believes that he could be much more, “a man for a future nation to be proud of.” He could bring that light into the mine—and free the children. But he must never come into contact with the child, and therefore they will not see each other again. The village arrives carrying torches, with the band playing and everyone singing Men of Harlech. They carry Morgan off on their shoulders to celebrate. Watty comes in with an envelope from Bessie—the baby's birth certificate. “Moffat my girl,” she says to herself, “you mustn’t be clumsy this time....” She looks out the window at the parade, full of pride. Tears glisten in her eyes.

== Cast ==
Rhys Williams, Rosalind Ivan, Mildred Dunnock and Gene Moss, members of the Broadway cast, reprised their roles for this film.

- Bette Davis as Lily Cristobel Moffat. The character was supposed to be in her 50s. To help her look the part, the 36-year-old Davis wore a gray wig and a "fat suit" that added 30 pounds (14 kg).
- Nigel Bruce as the Squire
- John Dall as Morgan Evans. Richard Waring was originally cast for the part, but was drafted for World War II.
- Rhys Williams as Mr. Jones
- Rosalind Ivan as Mrs. Watty
- Mildred Dunnock as Miss Ronberry
- Arthur Shields as Glyn Thomas
- Gwyneth Hughes as Sarah Pugh
- Thomas Louden as Old Tom
- Rhoda Williams As Wylodine
- Joan Lorring as Bessie Watty

== Production ==
It was the film debut of John Dall.

== Reception ==
=== Critical reviews ===
In The Nation in 1945, critic James Agee wrote, "I like and respect Miss Davis as a most unusually sincere and hard-working actress, and I have seen her play extremely well; but I did not find much in this performance to bring one beyond liking, respect, and, I am afraid, a kind of sympathy which no healthily functioning artist needs ... To be sure, the role is not a deeply perceived or well-written one, and the whole play seems stolid and weak." Decades later, Pauline Kael commented, "Lacking the moral authority of age and the solidity, Davis substituted an air of pedantic refinement that is too thin-spirited for the material. The film lingers in the memory anyway ... the director, Irving Rapper, rose to the occasion, and the supporting players ... have stronger personalities than in most Davis films."

=== Box office ===
According to financial records at Warner Bros., the film earned $2,202,000 domestically and $1,447,000 foreign.
