= List of awards and nominations received by Elmer Bernstein =

Elmer Bernstein awards and nominations
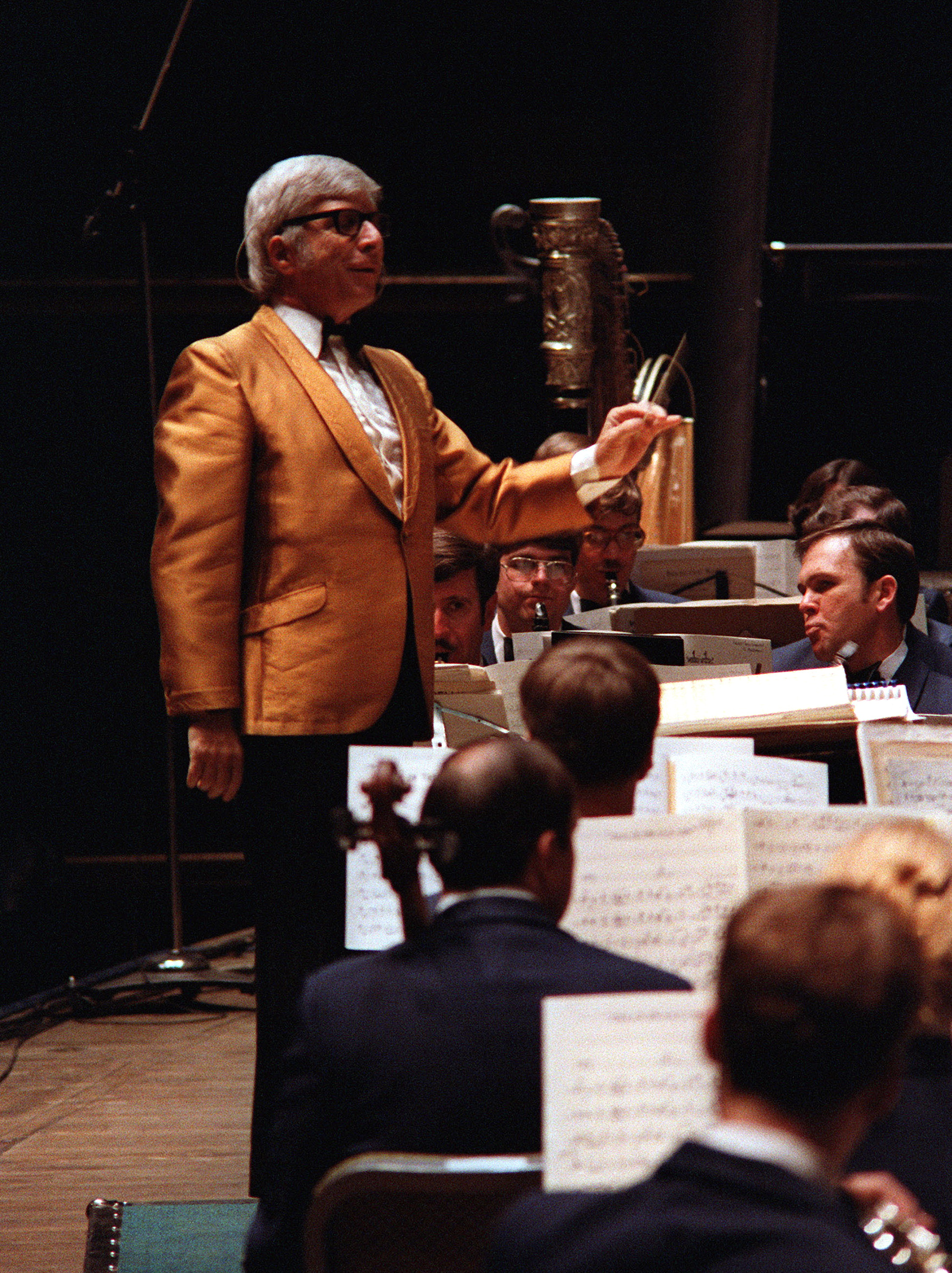
- Bernstein guest conducting the U.S. Air Force Band in 1981
Award	Wins	Nominations
Academy Awards	1	14
Emmy Awards	1	2
Golden Globe Awards	2	7
Grammy Awards	0	5
Tony Awards	0	2

Elmer Bernstein is an American composer, conductor, and songwriter.

In a career that spanned more than five decades, he composed "some of the most recognizable and memorable themes in Hollywood history", including over 150 original film scores, as well as scores for nearly 80 television productions. For his work he received an Academy Award for Thoroughly Modern Millie (1967) and Primetime Emmy Award. He also received seven Golden Globe Award, five Grammy Award, and two Tony Award nominations.

He composed and arranged scores for over 100 film scores including such films as Sudden Fear (1952), The Man with the Golden Arm (1955), The Ten Commandments (1956), Sweet Smell of Success (1957), The Magnificent Seven (1960), To Kill a Mockingbird (1962), The Great Escape (1963), Hud (1963), Thoroughly Modern Millie (1967), True Grit (1969), My Left Foot, The Grifters (1990), Cape Fear (1991) and Far from Heaven (2002).

== Major associations ==
=== Academy Awards ===
Year	Category	Nominated work	Result	Ref.
1956	Music Score of a Dramatic or Comedy Picture	The Man with the Golden Arm	Nominated	
1961	Music Score of a Dramatic or Comedy Picture	The Magnificent Seven	Nominated	
1962	Music Score of a Dramatic or Comedy Picture	Summer and Smoke	Nominated	
1963	Music Score — Substantially Original	To Kill a Mockingbird	Nominated	
1963	Best Original Song	"Walk on the Wild Side", Walk on the Wild Side	Nominated	
1967	Best Original Score	Hawaii	Nominated	
1967	Best Scoring of Music - Adaptation or Treatment	Return of the Seven	Nominated	
1967	Best Original Song	My Wishing Doll, Hawaii	Nominated	
1968	Best Original Score	Thoroughly Modern Millie	Won	
1970	Best Original Song	"True Grit", True Grit	Nominated	
1975	Best Original Song	"Wherever Love Takes Me", Gold	Nominated	
1984	Best Original Score	Trading Places	Nominated	
1994	Best Original Score	The Age of Innocence	Nominated	
2003	Best Original Score	Far from Heaven	Nominated	

=== Emmy Award ===
Year	Category	Nominated work	Result	Ref.
1964	Outstanding Composing Original Music for Television	The Making of the President 1960	Won	
1977	Outstanding Music Composition for a Series (Dramatic Underscore)	Captains and the Kings (for "Chapter 8")	Nominated	

=== Golden Globe Award ===
Year	Category	Nominated work	Result	Ref.
1962	Best Original Score	Summer and Smoke	Nominated	
1963	Best Original Score	To Kill a Mockingbird	Won	
1967	Best Original Score	Hawaii	Won	
1968	Best Original Score	Thoroughly Modern Millie	Nominated	
1970	Best Original Song	"True Grit", True Grit	Nominated	
1977	Best Original Song	"Hello and Goodbye", From Noon Till Three	Nominated	
2003	Best Original Score	Far from Heaven	Nominated	

=== Grammy Award ===
Year	Category	Nominated work	Result	Ref.
1963	Best Instrumentalist with an Orchestra	Walk on the Wild Side	Nominated	
1963	Best Instrumental Theme	Walk on the Wild Side	Nominated	
1985	Best Instrumental Theme	"Ghostbusters Theme", Ghostbusters	Nominated	
1985	Best Score Written for a Motion Picture	Ghostbusters	Nominated	
1994	Best Score Written for a Motion Picture	The Age of Innocence	Nominated	

=== Tony Award ===
Year	Category	Nominated work	Result	Ref.
1968	Best Original Score	How Now, Dow Jones	Nominated	
1983	Best Original Score	Merlin	Nominated	

== Miscellaneous awards ==
=== Chicago Film Critics Association ===
Year	Category	Nominated work	Result	Ref.
2002	Best Original Score	Far from Heaven	Won	

=== Los Angeles Film Critics Association ===
Year	Category	Nominated work	Result	Ref.
1991	Lifetime Achievement Award		Received	
2002	Best Original Score	Far from Heaven	Won	

=== National Board of Review ===
Year	Category	Nominated work	Result	Ref.
2002	Career Achievement Award		Received	

=== Phoenix Film Critics Society ===
Year	Category	Nominated work	Result	Ref.
2002	Best Original Score	Far from Heaven	Won	

=== Seattle Film Critics Awards ===
Year	Category	Nominated work	Result	Ref.
2002	Best Music	Far from Heaven	Won	

=== Telluride Film Festival ===
Year	Category	Nominated work	Result	Ref.
1992	Silver Medallion		Received	

=== Walk of Fame ===
Year	Category	Nominated work	Result	Ref.
1996	Star on the Walk of Fame		Received	
