= Robinson in Ruins =

- Directed by: Patrick Keiller
- Produced by: Patrick Keiller
- Starring: Vanessa Redgrave (narrator)
- Distributed by: British Film Institute
- Release date: 19 November 2010
- Running time: 101 minutes
- Country: United Kingdom
- Language: English

Robinson in Ruins is a 2010 British documentary film by Patrick Keiller and narrated by Vanessa Redgrave. It is a sequel to Keiller's previous films, London (1994) and Robinson in Space (1997). It documents the journey of the fictional title character around the south of England. It premiered at the 67th Venice International Film Festival in September 2010.

== Overview ==
After the death of Paul Scofield, Vanessa Redgrave assumes the role of narrator, who had narrated the previous films. Redgrave takes the part of the previous narrator's former lover. Similarly to her predecessor, she guides us through the actions of the main character, Robinson. There is a special focus on the importance of nature as we are guided through the surroundings of Oxfordshire and Berkshire. The director Keiller includes several subjects in this study of the natural world, such as philosophy, architecture, science, and politics.

== Release ==
The World Premiere was on 4 September at the 67th Venice International Film Festival. It was also screened at the New York Film Festival on 26 September 2010. It was released and distributed by the British Film Institute on 19 November 2010.
