= Rhubaba gallery and studios =

Coordinates: 55°57′54″N 3°10′39″W

Rhubaba Gallery and Studios
- Established: 2009
- Dissolved: 2021
- Location: 25 Arthur Street, Edinburgh, EH6 5DA
- Type: Art Gallery
- Website: http://www.rhubaba.org/

Rhubaba Gallery and Studios (established 2009) was an artist-run gallery and studios in Edinburgh, Scotland, co-founded by Edinburgh College of Art (ECA) graduates Frances Stacey, Rachel Adams, Tom Nolan, Catherine Payton and Claire Davies. They provided studio spaces for artists and practitioners alongside an annual changing programme of exhibitions and events. Rhubaba is a Scottish Charitable Incorporated Organisation, charity number SC043963 and received Open Project funding from Creative Scotland in 2016 and 2015. The physical gallery and studio space closed in 2021

== Notable exhibitions and events ==
1. Blind Love Bad Taste (2017), Siôn Parkinson & Rhubaba Choir
2. The Dilapidated Dwelling (2015), Patrick Keiller
3. OUTPOST Open: Film, a touring programme of films selected from OUTPOST artist membership, 2011, 2012 and 2013.
4. Subject to Alignment (2011), Frances Stacey and Tom Nolan

Their exhibitions and events have featured in Edinburgh Art Festival's (EAF) programme in 2013 and 2016.
