= Unseen Pictures =

- French: L’Œuvre Invisible
- Literally: The Invisible Work
- Directed by: Vladimir Rodionov & Avril Tembouret
- Produced by: Delastre Films; Les Productions de l’Aventure
- Starring: Jean Rochefort, Anouk Aimée, Jacques Perrin, Claude Lelouch, Jean-Claude Carrière, Édouard Baer
- Cinematography: Avril Tembouret, David Tabourier, Nicolas Legal
- Edited by: Maxime Cappello & Julien Munschy
- Music by: Frédéric Alvarez
- Release date: 8 April 2026
- Running time: 71 min.
- Language: French

Unseen Pictures (original title in French: L’Œuvre Invisible, The Invisible Work) is a documentary directed by Vladimir Rodionov and Avril Tembouret, on the career of "phantom" film maker Alexandre Trannoy, released in 2026.

== Subject ==
The film traces the "career" of Alexandre Trannoy, an "enigmatic" and "ghostly" French film maker, born in 1926, who worked for almost three decades in cinema, collaborating with stars such as Marlene Dietrich, Lino Ventura, Anouk Aimée, or Marcello Mastroianni, yet never completed one single movie, shaping a figure denoted as "the Don Quixote of cinema." Viewed retrospectively as a "noble dreamer," Trannoy's "elusive" figure was an obsession shared by the two directors since they were adolescent friends, hearing about him for the first time from veteran actor Jean Rochefort.

The film is unable to shed light on the post-cinema years of Trannoy, who, in the words of a reviewer, "disappear[ed] into the folds of film history," the world eventually learning only that he died in 1980 at the age of 54, in a plane crash, still scouting for film locations.

The documentary shows clips from film shot by Trannoy and contains numerous interviews with people who knew him, worked with him, or admired his work. Veteran French director Claude Lelouch relates the time he worked as assistant to Trannoy.
