= 24th Golden Globe Awards =

Film award ceremony in 1967

- Date: February 15, 1967

The 24th Golden Globe Awards, honoring the best in film and television for 1966, were held on February 15, 1967.

== Winners ==
=== Film ===
Best Motion Picture
Drama	Comedy or Musical
A Man for All Seasons; Born Free; The Professionals; The Sand Pebbles; Who's Afraid of Virginia Woolf?	The Russians Are Coming, the Russians Are Coming; A Funny Thing Happened on the Way to the Forum; Gambit; Not with My Wife, You Don't!; You're a Big Boy Now
Best Performance in a Motion Picture – Drama
Actor	Actress
Paul Scofield — A Man for All Seasons; Richard Burton — Who's Afraid of Virginia Woolf?; Michael Caine — Alfie; Steve McQueen — The Sand Pebbles; Max von Sydow — Hawaii	Anouk Aimée — A Man and a Woman (Un homme et une femme); Ida Kamińska — The Shop on Main Street (Obchod na korze); Virginia McKenna — Born Free; Elizabeth Taylor — Who's Afraid of Virginia Woolf?; Natalie Wood — This Property Is Condemned
Best Performance in a Motion Picture – Comedy or Musical
Actor	Actress
Alan Arkin — The Russians Are Coming, the Russians Are Coming; Alan Bates — Georgy Girl; Michael Caine — Gambit; Lionel Jeffries — The Spy with a Cold Nose; Walter Matthau — The Fortune Cookie	Lynn Redgrave — Georgy Girl; Jane Fonda — Any Wednesday; Elizabeth Hartman — You're a Big Boy Now; Shirley MacLaine — Gambit; Vanessa Redgrave — Morgan!
Best Supporting Performance in a Motion Picture – Drama, Comedy or Musical
Supporting Actor	Supporting Actress
Richard Attenborough — The Sand Pebbles; Mako — The Sand Pebbles; John Saxon — The Appaloosa; George Segal — Who's Afraid of Virginia Woolf?; Robert Shaw — A Man for All Seasons	Jocelyne LaGarde — Hawaii; Sandy Dennis — Who's Afraid of Virginia Woolf?; Vivien Merchant — Alfie; Geraldine Page — You're a Big Boy Now; Shelley Winters — Alfie
Other
Best Director	Best Screenplay
Fred Zinnemann — A Man for All Seasons; Lewis Gilbert — Alfie; Claude Lelouch — A Man and a Woman; Mike Nichols — Who's Afraid of Virginia Woolf?; Robert Wise — The Sand Pebbles	A Man for All Seasons — Robert Bolt; Alfie — Bill Naughton; The Russians Are Coming, the Russians Are Coming — William Rose; The Sand Pebbles — Robert Anderson; Who's Afraid of Virginia Woolf? — Ernest Lehman
Best Original Score	Best Original Song
Hawaii — Elmer Bernstein; A Man and a Woman — Francis Lai; Is Paris Burning? (Paris brûle-t-il?) — Maurice Jarre; The Bible: In the Beginning... — Toshiro Mayuzumi; The Sand Pebbles — Jerry Goldsmith	"Strangers in the Night" — A Man Could Get Killed; "Un Homme et une Femme (A Man and a Woman)" - A Man and a Woman; "Born Free" - Born Free; "Alfie" - Alfie; "Georgy Girl" - Georgy Girl

=== Television ===
Best Television Series
Best TV Show
I Spy; The Fugitive; The Man from U.N.C.L.E.; Run for Your Life; That Girl
Best Performance in a Television Series
Best TV Star - Male	Best TV Star - Female
Dean Martin — The Dean Martin Show; Bill Cosby — I Spy; Robert Culp — I Spy; Ben Gazzara — Run for Your Life; Christopher George — The Rat Patrol	Marlo Thomas — That Girl; Phyllis Diller — The Pruitts of Southampton; Barbara Eden — I Dream of Jeannie; Elizabeth Montgomery — Bewitched; Barbara Stanwyck — The Big Valley
