= 1966 National Society of Film Critics Awards =

Annual US film award ceremony

1st NSFC Awards

January 1967

Best Picture:
Blow-Up

The 1st National Society of Film Critics Awards, given by the National Society of Film Critics in January 1967, honored the best in film for 1966.

== Winners ==
=== Best Picture ===
- Blow-Up

=== Best Director ===
- Michelangelo Antonioni – Blow-Up

=== Best Actor ===
1. Michael Caine – Alfie
2. Richard Burton – Who's Afraid of Virginia Woolf?
2. Max von Sydow – Hawaii
4. Laurence Olivier – Othello
4. Paul Scofield – A Man for All Seasons

=== Best Actress ===
1. Sylvie – The Shameless Old Lady (La vieille dame indigne)
2. Vanessa Redgrave – Morgan!
3. Anouk Aimée – A Man and a Woman (Un homme et une femme)
