= King Lear (1971 British film) =

1971 film

- Film poster
- Directed by: Peter Brook
- Written by: Peter Brook; William Shakespeare
- Produced by: Michael Birkett; Mogens Skot-Hansen
- Starring: Paul Scofield
- Cinematography: Henning Kristiansen
- Edited by: Kasper Schyberg
- Production companies: Filmways; Royal Shakespeare Company
- Distributed by: Columbia Pictures
- Release date: 4 February 1971
- Running time: 137 minutes
- Country: United Kingdom
- Language: English

King Lear is a 1971 British film adaptation of the Shakespeare play directed by Peter Brook and starring Paul Scofield. Filmed in stark black-and-white, the film was inspired by the absurdist theatre of playwrights such as Samuel Beckett and upon release was noted for its bleak tone and wintry atmosphere.

== Cast ==
- Cyril Cusack as Albany
- Susan Engel as Regan
- Tom Fleming as Kent
- Anne-Lise Gabold as Cordelia
- Ian Hogg as Edmund
- Søren Elung Jensen as Duke of Burgundy
- Robert Langdon Lloyd as Edgar (as Robert Lloyd)
- Jack MacGowran as Fool
- Patrick Magee as Cornwall
- Paul Scofield as King Lear
- Barry Stanton as Oswald
- Alan Webb as Gloucester
- Irene Worth as Goneril

== Production ==
Peter Brook’s version of King Lear was prompted by an essay by Polish critic Jan Kott titled “King Lear or Endgame”, where Kott writes that Shakespeare's play is a tragedy of the grotesque, “an ironic, clownish morality play, […] a mockery of all eschatologies: of the heaven promised on earth, and the heaven promised after death.” The film was shot in 16mm black-and-white and mostly made in the mid-winter dune country of the Jutland Peninsula of Denmark.

== Review ==
Brook's film starkly divided the critics: Pauline Kael said "I didn't just dislike this production, I hated it!" and suggested the alternative title "Night of the Living Dead". Yet Robert Hatch in The Nation thought it as "excellent a filming of the play as one can expect" and Vincent Canby in The New York Times called it "an exalting Lear, full of exquisite terror". The film drew heavily on the ideas of Jan Kott, in particular his observation that King Lear was the precursor of absurdist theatre: in particular, the film has parallels with Beckett's Endgame. Film critic John Simon described King Lear as "catastrophic".

Critics who dislike the film particularly draw attention to its bleak nature from its opening: complaining that the world of the play does not deteriorate with Lear's suffering, but commences dark, colourless and wintry, leaving (in Douglas Brode's words) "Lear, the land, and us with nowhere to go". Cruelty pervades the film, which does not distinguish between the violence of ostensibly good and evil characters, presenting both as savagery. Paul Scofield, as Lear, eschews sentimentality: this demanding old man with a coterie of unruly knights provokes audience sympathy for the daughters in the early scenes, and his presentation explicitly rejects the tradition (as Daniel Rosenthal describes it) of playing Lear as "poor old white-haired patriarch".
