= The Big Brother =

- Directed by: Francis Girod
- Written by: Francis Girod; Michel Grisolia
- Story by: Sam Ross
- Starring: Gérard Depardieu
- Cinematography: Bernard Zitzermann
- Edited by: Henri Colpi
- Music by: Pierre Jansen
- Distributed by: Gaumont Distribution
- Release date: 1982
- Language: French

The Big Brother (French: Le Grand Frère) is a 1982 French crime drama film written and directed by Francis Girod and starring Gérard Depardieu.

The film was entered into the main competition at the 39th edition of the Venice Film Festival. For her performance Souad Amidou was nominated for Most Promising Actress at the 1983 César Awards.

== Cast ==
- Gérard Depardieu as Gérard Berger / Bernard Vigo
- Souad Amidou as Zina
- Hakim Ghanem as Ali
- Jean Rochefort as Charles-Henri Rossi
- Jacques Villeret as Inspector Coleau
- Roger Planchon as Inspector Valin
- Smaïn as Abdel
- Jean-Michel Ribes as Client of Zina
- Corinne Dacla as Gérard's lover
- Christine Fersen as Jane
- François Clavier as Castel
