= The Best Job in the World (film) =

1996 film

- Directed by: Gérard Lauzier
- Written by: Gérard Lauzier
- Produced by: Jean-Louis Livi
- Starring: Gérard Depardieu; Michèle Laroque; Ticky Holgado; Souad Amidou; Guy Marchand
- Cinematography: Jean-Yves Le Mener
- Edited by: Georges Klotz
- Music by: Vladimir Cosma
- Distributed by: AMLF
- Release date: 11 December 1996
- Running time: 105 minutes
- Country: France
- Language: French
- Budget: $9.9 million
- Box office: $13.6 million

The Best Job in the World (French: Le Plus Beau Métier du monde) is a 1996 French comedy drama film directed by Gérard Lauzier. It was entered into the 20th Moscow International Film Festival.

== Cast ==
- Gérard Depardieu as Laurent Monier
- Michèle Laroque as Hélène Monier
- Ticky Holgado as Baudouin
- Souad Amidou as Radia Ben Saïd
- Guy Marchand as Gauthier
- Philippe Khorsand as Le gardien de l'immeuble
- Daniel Prévost as Albert Constantini, le voisin
- Roschdy Zem as Ahmed Raouch
- Mouss Diouf as Momo
- Joseph Malerba as Taxi driver
