= Geneviève Sorya =

French actress

- Born: Geneviève Marie Thérèse Durand; 23 June 1912; Paris, France
- Died: 23 March 2008 (aged 95); Paris, France
- Occupation: Actress
- Spouse: Henry Murray (born Henri Dreyfus)
- Children: Anouk Aimée

Geneviève Sorya (born Geneviève Marie Thérèse Durand; 23 June 1912 – 23 March 2008) was a French stage and film actress. She was also known as the mother of actress Anouk Aimée.

Sorya performed in over 15 films, including The End of the Day, and The Man of the Hour (1937) with Maurice Chevalier although she was primarily a stage actress in her native Paris. In 1981 she appeared in the film What Puts David with her daughter.

Sorya was the daughter of André Hippolyte Durand and Émilie Marguerite Mélanie (née Boussiron) Durand. She was married to French actor Henry Murray (born Henri Dreyfus), with whom she had a daughter, who became actress Anouk Aimée. Sorya studied at the Conservatory of Dramatic Art in Paris.

== Selected filmography ==
- The Brighton Twins (1936)
