= Souad Amidou =

French actress

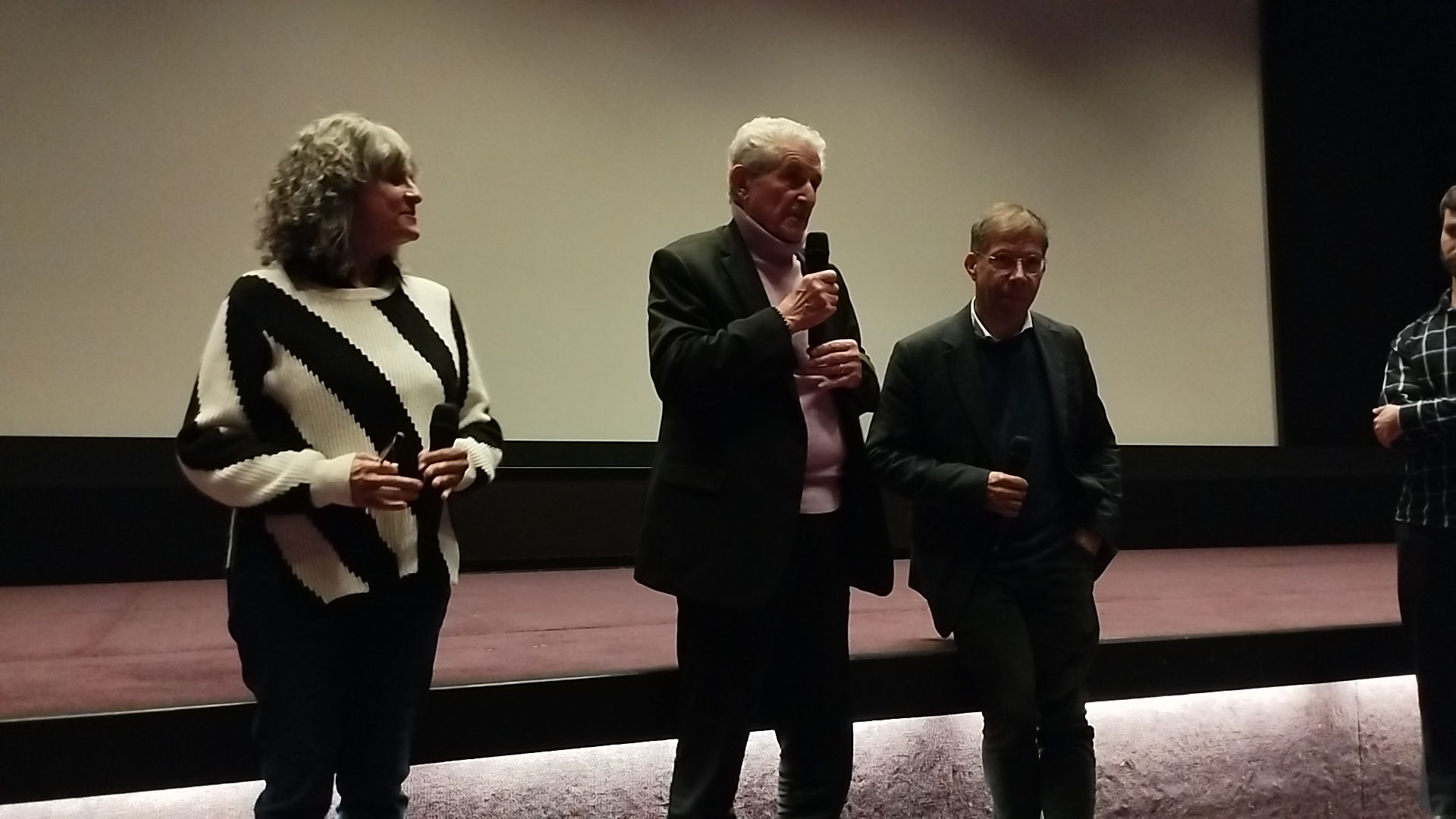
- Born: 4 July 1959 (age 67); Nanterre, Hauts-de-Seine, France
- Occupation: Actress
- Years active: 1966–present
- Spouse: Fabien Onteniente (m. 1987; div. 1991)
- Father: Amidou

Souad Amidou (born 4 July 1959) is a French actress.

== Biography ==
She is the daughter of the actor Amidou. Her career started working with her father on the short film Le thé à la menthe in 1963. Then she was chosen by Claude Lelouch to play the daughter of Anouk Aimée in Un homme et une femme in 1966.

As a young woman, she studied acting lessons with Anicette Fray. She trained at the New Square Sylvia Monfort, then continued with Jean-Louis Martin-Barbaz, and later with John Strasberg and Andreas Voutsinas.

Since the early 1980s, she has acted in cinema and television. She became popular with her role in Le Grand frère from Francis Girod that got her a nomination for the César Award for Most Promising Actress. She also worked with Gérald Oury, Jacques Deray, Ariel Zeitoun, Gérard Lauzier and Steven Spielberg.

On 23 December 1987, she married director Fabien Onteniente; the couple broke up on 15 March 1991.

She received the Legion of Honour decoration in 2008

In 2009, she directed the first short film Camille and Jamila, but she proved her talent as a filmmaker with her second film Rendez-vous avec Ninette, presented in many festivals.

== Civic engagement ==
Souad Amidou is vegan and a member of the sponsorship committee of the Institut citoyen du cinéma as well as the NGO Vegan Marathon.

== Filmography ==
Year	Title	Role	Director	Notes
1966	A Man and a Woman	Françoise Gauthier	Claude Lelouch	
1981	Les filles de Grenoble	Liliane	Joël Le Moigné	
1982	The Big Brother	Zina Khelifa	Francis Girod	Nominated - César Award for Most Promising Actress
1984	Julien Fontanes, magistrat	Mina	Daniel Moosmann	TV series (1 episode)
1984	P'tit Con	Salima	Gérard Lauzier	
1985	Diesel	Kim	Robert Kramer	
1985	Néo Polar	Dany	Daniel Moosmann (2); Marc Villard	TV series (1 episode)
1987	Lévy et Goliath	Malika	Gérard Oury	
1987	Le passager du Tassili		Sarah Maldoror	TV movie
1987	Maladie d'amour	Farida	Jacques Deray	
1987	Vaines recherches	Soledad	Nicolas Ribowski	TV movie
1988	A Mala de Cartão	Linda	Michel Wyn	TV mini-series
1988	L'affaire Saint-Romans	Judith Saint-Romans	Michel Wyn (2)	TV mini-series
1989	Bobby et l'aspirateur		Fabien Onteniente	Short
1990	La batalla de los Tres Reyes		Souheil Ben-Barka; Uchkun Nazarov	
1991	Les hordes	Sarah	Jean-Claude Missiaen	TV mini-series
1992	Sun Child	Aicha	Driss Tahri	Short
1992	Neige dans le midi	Françoise Choukri	Michèle Ferrand-Lafaye	TV movie
1993	Le nombril du monde	Amina	Ariel Zeitoun	
1993-95	Rocca	Inspector Fred Dubreuil	Paul Planchon; Bernard Dumont	TV series (4 episodes)
1994	La danse du feu	Habiba M'Sika	Selma Baccar	
1995	Tom est tout seul	The nurse	Fabien Onteniente (2)	
1996	The Best Job in the World	Radia Ben Saïd	Gérard Lauzier (2)	
1996	Et si l'on vivait ensemble	Marie	Nathalie Camidebach	Short
1997-99	Mission protection rapprochée	Diane Rousseau		TV series (6 episodes)
2001	Joséphine, ange gardien	Nizah	Jacob Berger	TV series (1 episode)
2002	3 zéros	Fabienne	Fabien Onteniente (3)	
2002	And Now... Ladies and Gentlemen	Chambermaid	Claude Lelouch (2)	
2005	L'homme qui voulait passer à la télé	Jenissa	Amar Arhab; Fabrice Michelin	TV movie
2005	Permis d'aimer	Sama	Rachida Krim	TV movie
2005	Munich	Yussef's Wife	Steven Spielberg	
2006	Commissaire Moulin	The Attorney	José Pinheiro	TV series (2 episodes)
2007	Adieu mères	Ruth	Mohamed Ismail	
2008	Il faut sauver Saïd	The mother	Didier Grousset	TV movie
2010	La maison des Rocheville	Antonella	Jacques Otmezguine	TV mini-series (5 episodes)
2012	Le noir (te) vous va si bien	Maléké	Jacques Bral	
2019	The Best Years of a Life	Françoise Gauthier	Claude Lelouch	
2019	La Loi de...	Sabine Bernel		TV series
