= Jan Kott =

Polish political activist, critic and theoretician of the theatre

- Born: October 27, 1914; Warsaw, Congress Poland
- Died: December 22, 2001 (aged 87); Santa Monica, California
- Writing career
- Notable works: Shakespeare, Our Contemporary
- Notable awards: Herder Prize (1964)

Jan Kott (October 27, 1914 – December 22, 2001) was a Polish political activist, critic and theoretician of the theatre. A leading proponent of Stalinism in Poland for nearly a decade after the Soviet takeover, Kott renounced his Communist Party membership in 1957 following the anti-Stalinist Polish October of 1956. He defected to the United States in 1965. He is regarded as having considerable influence upon Western productions of Shakespeare in the second half of the 20th century.

== Life ==
Born in Warsaw in 1914 to a Jewish family, Kott was baptized into the Catholic Church at the age of five. He became a communist in the 1930s, and took part in the defense of Warsaw. In June 1939 he married Lidia Steinhaus, the daughter of the mathematician and educator Hugo Steinhaus.

In September 1939, Kott fought in the Polish army in its campaign against the German invasion and then, after a period in Lvov, returned to Nazi-occupied Warsaw. After World War II he became known initially as the editor-in-chief of the literary magazine Kuźnica and as Poland's leading theorist of Socialist realism. In 1949, as the communist authorities tightened their control over all aspects of life, Kott obtained a position as a professor in Wrocław and moved away from political life. He praised Joseph Stalin, but mostly concentrated on theater. In 1951, during the darkest period of Soviet terror, Kott published an ideological manifesto about the role of theater, entitled "O teatr godny naszej epoki" (For theater worthy of our times), in which he demanded a "new" theater subservient to the Party and its ideology. Historian Teresa Wilniewczyc noted, that his zeal for totalitarian control over the world of Polish culture was "far more than was required". Only after the Stalin era came to an end, did he become its ardent critic (March 1956). He renounced his membership of the communist party in 1957. In 1964 he was one of the signatories of the so-called Letter of 34 to Prime Minister Józef Cyrankiewicz regarding freedom of culture.

=== Later career ===
Kott traveled to the United States in 1965 on a scholarship from the Ford Foundation. He lectured at Yale and Berkeley, but spent the years 1969 to 1983 teaching at Stony Brook University until he retired. The Polish authorities refused to extend his passport after three years, at which point he decided to defect. As a result, he was stripped of his professorship at Warsaw University. A poet, translator, and literary critic, he became one of the more prolific essayists of the Polish school in America. He died in Santa Monica, California after a heart attack in 2001.

As a theatrical reviewer, Kott received praise for his readings of the classics, and above all of Shakespeare. In his influential volume Shakespeare, Our Contemporary (1964), he interpreted the plays in the light of philosophical and existential experiences of the 20th century, augmented with his own life's story. This autobiographical accent became a hallmark of his criticism, as exemplified in his collection of essays on theater, The Gender of Rosalind. Kott sought to juxtapose Shakespeare with Eugène Ionesco and Samuel Beckett, but his greatest insight came from the juxtaposition of Shakespeare with his own life. He took a similar approach to his reading of Greek tragedy in The Eating of the Gods. Reportedly, Peter Brook's film King Lear and Roman Polanski's Macbeth (both made in 1971) were influenced by Kott's view of Shakespearean high tragedy in relation to the 20th-century "nightmare of history". Another Kott collection of essays, The Memory of the Body: Essays on Theatre and Death, extended his influence beyond theater in the English-speaking world.

Kott wrote many books and articles published in American journals such as The New Republic, Partisan Review and The New York Review of Books. Aside from Shakespeare and Greek tragedy, he also wrote about theatre of Japan, Tadeusz Kantor and Jerzy Grotowski. He translated works by Jean-Paul Sartre, Denis Diderot, Eugène Ionesco and Molière into Polish and English.
