= The Best Years of a Life =

2019 film

- Film poster
- French: Les plus belles années d'une vie
- Directed by: Claude Lelouch
- Written by: Claude Lelouch
- Starring: Anouk Aimée; Jean-Louis Trintignant
- Release dates: 18 May 2019 (Cannes); 22 May 2019 (France)
- Running time: 90 minutes
- Country: France
- Language: French

The Best Years of a Life (French: Les plus belles années d'une vie) is a 2019 French drama film directed by Claude Lelouch. It was screened out of competition at the 2019 Cannes Film Festival. It follows the lead characters featured in the earlier films A Man and a Woman (1966) and A Man and a Woman: 20 Years Later (1986). It was also Trintignant's and Aimée's final film roles during their lifetimes, prior to their deaths in 2022 and 2024.

== Plot ==
The once-charming racing driver Jean-Louis Duroc lives in a retirement home in Varengeville-sur-Mer in Normandy. An octogenarian in the twilight of his life, he cherishes nostalgic memories and dreams of his greatest love story, with Anne, whom he met 52 years earlier at the boarding school of their respective children, Antoine and Françoise, in Deauville... Antoine then organizes a romantic, moving, and nostalgic reunion for them, in a backdrop of Normandy, by using the sounds of "chabadabada," love telegrams, the telephone number "Montmartre 15 40," the racing number "184" on the doors of the Ford Mustang from the Monte Carlo Rally, the room number "26" at the Normandy Barrière hotel, and the beaches of Deauville's boardwalk...

== Cast ==
- Jean-Louis Trintignant as Jean-Louis Duroc
- Anouk Aimée as Anne Gauthier
- Souad Amidou as Françoise Gauthier, daughter of Anne
- Antoine Sire as Antoine Duroc, son of Jean-Louis
- Marianne Denicourt as La responsible
- Monica Bellucci as Elena, daughter of Jean-Louis Duroc
