= Paul Scofield =

English actor (1922–2008)

Paul Scofield CH CBE
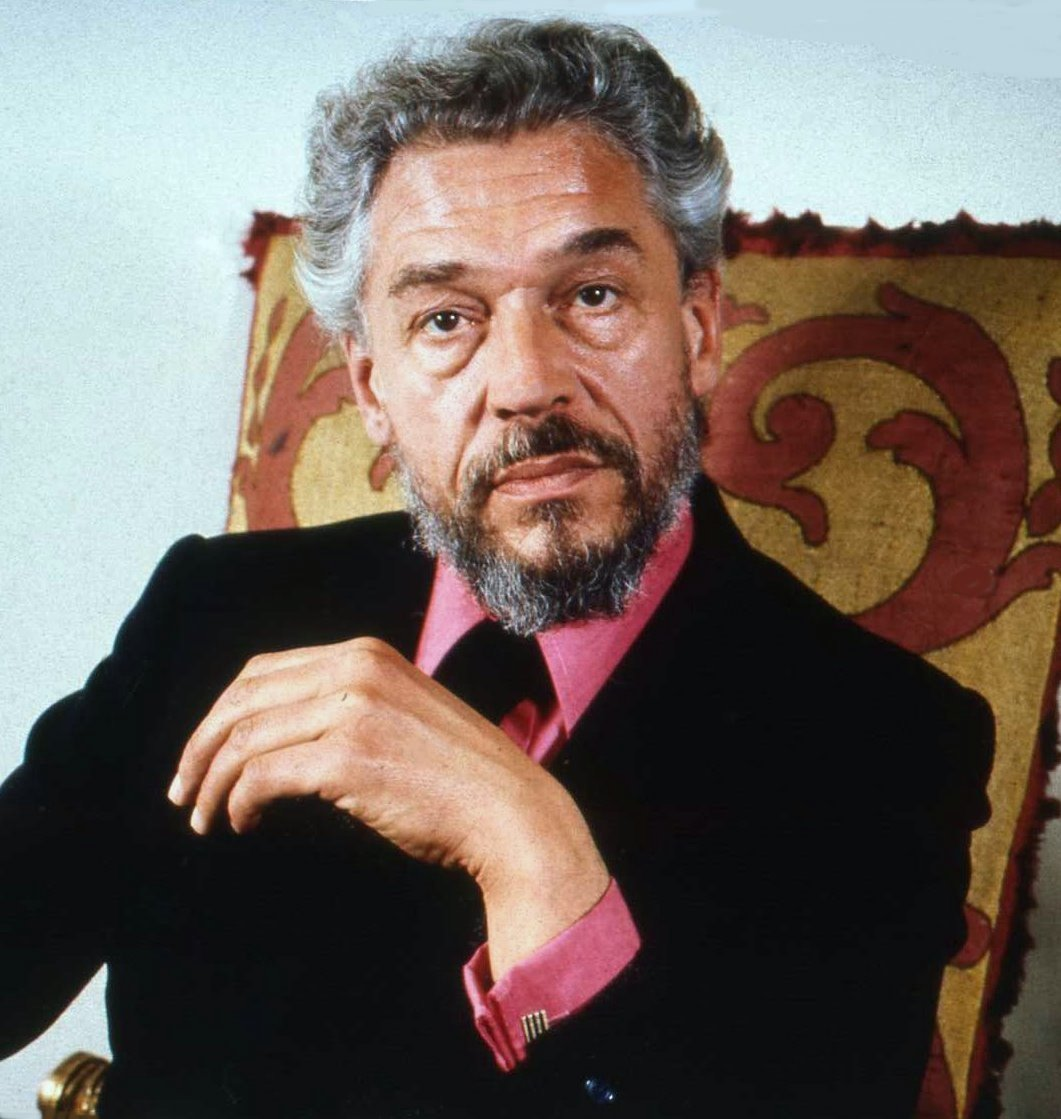
- Scofield in 1975
- Born: David Paul Scofield; 21 January 1922; Birmingham, Warwickshire, England
- Died: 19 March 2008 (aged 86); Brighton, East Sussex, England
- Resting place: St Mary's Churchyard, Balcombe, West Sussex
- Occupation: Actor
- Years active: 1940–2006
- Spouse: Joy Parker (m. 1943)
- Children: 2

David Paul Scofield (21 January 1922 – 19 March 2008) was an English actor. During a six-decade career, Scofield achieved the Triple Crown of Acting, winning an Academy Award, a Primetime Emmy Award, and a Tony Award for his work. Completing the feat in just seven years, no actor has achieved the Triple Crown faster than Scofield. He is celebrated for his reputation as one of the greatest Shakespearean performers. He declined the honour of a knighthood on three separate occasions (in 1968, 1974, and 1987), but was appointed CBE in 1956 and became a CH in 2001.

Scofield received the Tony Award for Best Actor in a Play for portraying Sir Thomas More in the Broadway production of A Man for All Seasons (1962). Four years later, he won the Academy Award for Best Actor when he reprised the role in the 1966 film adaptation, making him one of eleven to receive a Tony and Academy Award for the same role. He received the Primetime Emmy Award for Male of the Species (1969).

Scofield garnered acclaim for his roles in films such as The Train (1964), King Lear (1971), A Delicate Balance (1973), Henry V (1989), and Hamlet (1990). He portrayed Mark Van Doren in the historical drama Quiz Show (1994), for which he earned a nomination for the Academy Award for Best Supporting Actor. For his role as Thomas Danforth in the film adaptation of The Crucible (1996) he received the BAFTA Award for Best Actor in a Supporting Role.

== Early life and education ==
Paul Scofield was born on 21 January 1922 in Edgbaston, Birmingham, Warwickshire, England, the son of Mary and Edward Harry Scofield. When Scofield was a few weeks old, his family moved to Hurstpierpoint, Sussex, where his father became headmaster at the Hurstpierpoint Church of England School. Scofield told his biographer, Garry O'Connor, that his upbringing was divided. His father was an Anglican and his mother a Roman Catholic. Baptised into his mother's faith, Scofield said, "some days we were little Protestants and, on others, we were all devout little Catholics." He added, "A lack of direction in spiritual matters is still with me."

Scofield recalled: "I was a dunce at school. But at the age of twelve I went to Varndean School at Brighton where I discovered Shakespeare. They did one of his plays every year, and I lived just for that." In 1961, Scofield wrote, "I don't have a psychological approach to acting; fundamentally, I have an intuitive approach. For me, the totally intellectual approach is never satisfactory. What matters to me is whether I like the play, for one thing, and, for another, whether I can recognize and identify myself with the character I'm to play." In 1939, Scofield left school at the age of seventeen and began training at the Croydon Repertory Theatre. Shortly after the outbreak of the Second World War, Scofield arrived for a physical examination and was ruled unfit for service in the British Army. He later recalled, "They found I had crossed toes. I was unable to wear boots. I was deeply ashamed."

== Career ==
=== 1940–1959: Rise to prominence ===
Scofield began his stage career in 1940 with a debut performance in American playwright Eugene O'Neill's Desire Under the Elms at the Westminster Theatre, and was soon being compared to Laurence Olivier. He played at the Birmingham Repertory Theatre. From there he went to the Shakespeare Memorial Theatre in Stratford, where he starred in Walter Nugent Monck's 1947 revival of Pericles, Prince of Tyre.

In 1948, Scofield appeared as Hamlet at the Shakespeare Memorial Theatre in Stratford alongside a then unknown Claire Bloom as Ophelia. Scofield's performance was so highly praised that it caused him to be dubbed, "The Hamlet of his generation." He was also Bassanio in The Merchant of Venice with Bloom as an Attendee. J. C. Trewin commented, "He is simply a timeless Hamlet... None could forget Scofield's pathos, the face folded in grief, at, 'When you are desirous to be blessed, I'll blessing beg of you.' We have known many correct, almost formal Hamlets, aloof from Elsinore. Scofield was ever a prisoner within its bounds: the world had many confines, wards, and dungeons, Denmark being one of the worst."

John Harrison, Director of the Leeds Playhouse, later recalled of Scofield's Hamlet, "'Get thee to a nunnery,' so often delivered with rage or scorn, he says so gently. You have visions of quiet and prayer. A future for Ophelia." In her later book, Leaving a Doll's House: A Memoir, Claire Bloom recalls that during the production she had a very serious crush on Scofield. As Scofield "was happily married and the father of a son", Bloom hoped only "to be flirted with and taken some notice of." But Scofield never so much as glanced at Bloom or any of the other pretty actresses in the cast. Unusually, the production had two Hamlets: Scofield and Robert Helpmann took turns playing the title role and Bloom later recalled, "I could never make up my mind which of my two Hamlets I found the more devastating: the openly homosexual, charismatic Helpmann, or the charming, shy young man from Sussex."

Scofield's versatility at the height of his career is exemplified by his starring roles in theatrical productions as diverse as the musical Expresso Bongo (1958) and Peter Brook's celebrated production of King Lear (1962). Brook wrote in his memoir, Threads of Time, "The door at the back of the set opened, and a small man entered. He was wearing a black suit, steel-rimmed glasses and holding a suitcase. For a moment we wondered who this stranger was and why he was wandering onto our stage. Then we realised that it was Paul, transformed. His tall body had shrunk; he had become insignificant. The new character now possessed him entirely."

Scofield also played in a big box office hit, Carve Her Name with Pride.

=== 1960–1979: A Man for All Seasons and acclaim ===
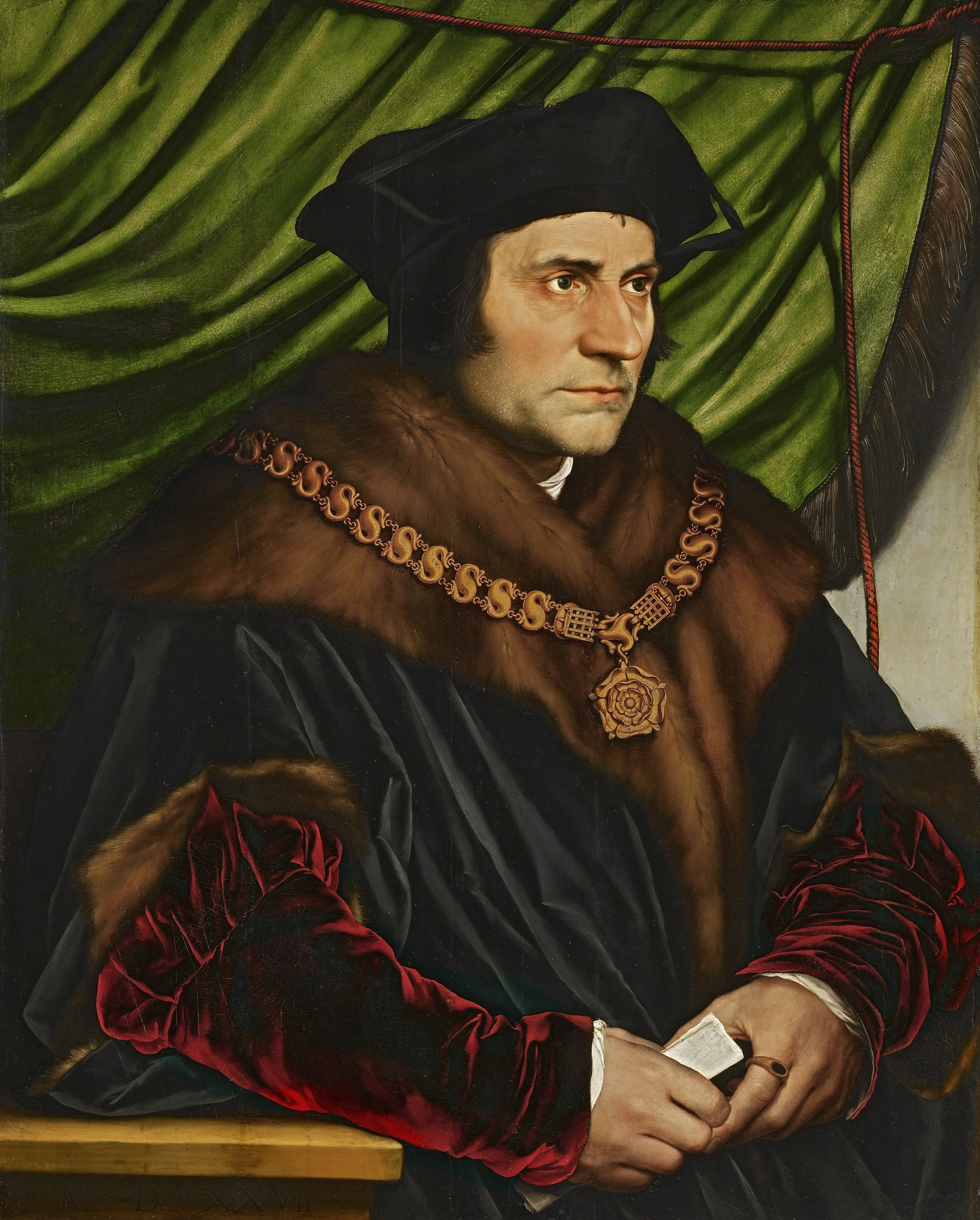
Scofield portrayed Sir Thomas More in the film and stage version of A Man for All Seasons

One of the highlights of Scofield's career in modern theatre is the role of Sir Thomas More in Robert Bolt's A Man for All Seasons, which opened in July 1960. Scofield later referred to the part as the only time "my intuition for the part has failed me." Theatre reviewers published very harsh criticism of Scofield's performance at first, which forced him to "start from scratch and just work on facts, making myself totally faithful to what was on the page". After realizing "I had to find the way the man would feel; then I was able to find the way he should sound", and the vital importance of conveying complete sincerity and humility when "playing a man of spiritual depth", Scofield successfully developed a means of performing as Thomas More through trial and error.

Austrian-American filmmaker Fred Zinnemann later recalled of seeing the play onstage, "It dealt with the sixteenth-century English statesman Thomas More, beheaded on the orders of his King, Henry VIII, for refusing to sanction his marriage to Anne Boleyn. With Paul Scofield in the lead, the play was a powerful emotional experience. It dramatized the nation's unquestioning submission to the absolute power of the king, in stark contrast to More, whose last words before the execution were, 'I die the King's good servant, but God's first.'"

When Fred Zinnemann was first approached about directing the 1966 film adaptation of A Man For All Seasons by Columbia Pictures executive Mike Frankovich in 1965 and enthusiastically agreed, the studio did not wish to cast Scofield as the lead. Preferring a more internationally bankable cast, the studio desired either Laurence Olivier or Richard Burton as Thomas More, Alec Guinness as Cardinal Wolsey, and Peter O'Toole as King Henry VIII. Both Zinnemann and screenwriter Robert Bolt disagreed, however, but still went through the motions of meeting with Olivier and then informing him politely that he had not been chosen. Scofield, who was cast after Columbia grudgingly "fell in with Zinnemann's wishes", later recalled, "I was surprised and honoured to be chosen for the film, being almost unknown in the movie world... My own task was unaltered except that I now focused on my thoughts on to a camera instead of an audience."

Even though defying the studio's casting wishes forced him to film A Man For All Seasons on a shoestring budget, Fred Zinnemann felt very differently about Scofield and later recalled of the film shoot, "For the first few days the crew did their usual work very well, the way they would have done any job, but on the third day, when Scofield made his speech about the majesty of the law, they were suddenly mesmerized by the magic of those words and they remained that way throughout the rest of the filming. So totally did Paul convey the scope of More's character that for months afterwards I couldn't help but look at him in awe, as a saint rather than an actor."

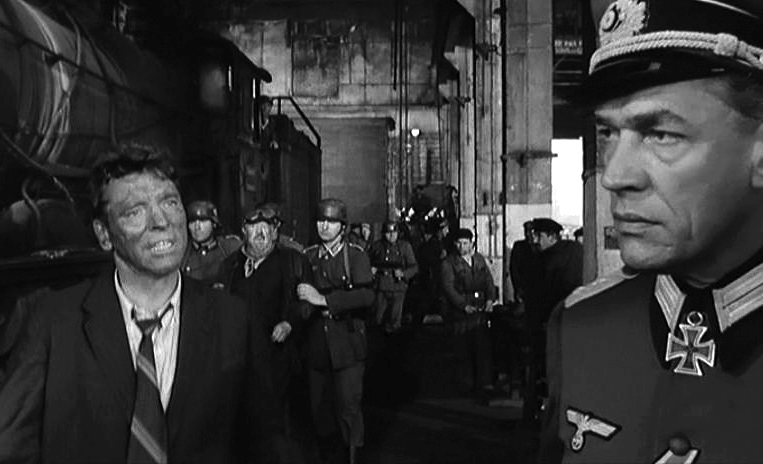
Burt Lancaster and Scofield in The Train (1964)

In 1964, Scofield acted in the John Frankenheimer war film The Train alongside Burt Lancaster. The film is set in August 1944 during World War II, it pits French Resistance-member Paul Labiche (Lancaster) against German Colonel Franz von Waldheim (Scofield), who is attempting to move stolen art masterpieces by train to Germany. The film received positive acclaim and was ranked as one of the best films by the National Board of Review.

Writing in 1961, Scofield explained, "Output in the theatre requires greater energy than anything else I know. Doubt of one's energy is the worst of all. One's output in the theatre requires energy of a sort that is never a factor in family life. Family energy generates itself. Social life outside the family can be exhausting. I don't care much for social life with people in the theatre. I'm rather good at being with people when I want to make the effort, but I'm bad at listening to people when I know what they're going to say. It isn't very interesting, and on the whole it's very draining. The interesting thing in the theatre is the work and working with people. I usually like the people in the work, but I can't go on with them outside the work as long as most actors can. And when I'm working on a part I'm thinking about it all the time, going over all the possibilities in my mind. I like to be alone when I'm working."

In a career devoted chiefly to the classical theatre, Scofield starred in many Shakespeare plays and played the title role in Ben Jonson's Volpone in Peter Hall's production for the Royal National Theatre (1977). In a 1994 interview, Scofield explained, "One of the great strengths of the theatre is that it is ephemeral. It does exist only in what you remember and you can't check up on it afterwards and think, 'That's not as good as I remember.' If any performance I've ever given stays in someone's mind that's so much more exciting than being able to put it on the video and play it again. It's not that I don't want to take risks - the opposite is true, in fact. But the more you know about acting, the more you're aware of the pitfalls and the more nerve-racking it becomes. When I was young, I wasn't nervous at all. Even doing Hamlet, I just had a go."

Scofield also appeared as Charles Dyer in Dyer's play Staircase, staged by the Royal Shakespeare Company in 1966; Laurie in John Osborne's A Hotel in Amsterdam (1968); and Antonio Salieri in the original stage production of Peter Shaffer's Amadeus (1979). He was subsequently the voice of the Dragon in another play by Robert Bolt, a children's drama The Thwarting of Baron Bolligrew. Expresso Bongo, Staircase and Amadeus were filmed with other actors, but Scofield starred in the screen version of King Lear (1971). His other major screen roles include the art-obsessed Wehrmacht Colonel von Waldheim in The Train (1964), Strether in a 1977 TV adaptation of Henry James's novel The Ambassadors, and Tobias in Edward Albee's A Delicate Balance (1973).

=== 1980–1999 ===
Scofield was cast in the lead role of Sir Randolph Nettleby in the 1985 film The Shooting Party, but was forced to withdraw due to an injury he suffered on set. According to the DVD extras documentary for the film, Scofield and the other male lead actors were to come into shot on a horse-drawn shooting brake driven by the renowned film horse-master George Mossman as the first shot of the first day of filming. As they turned the first corner, the plank that Mossman was standing on broke in two and he was hurled forward and down, falling between the sets of wheels and taking the reins with him. He was struck by a horse's hoof and concussed. The horses shied and broke into a gallop. Actor Rupert Frazer admitted that he was the first to jump off, landing safely, but bruised. Out of control, the horses turned to the right when confronted by a stone wall, causing the shooting brake to roll completely, catapulting the actors into a pile of scaffolding that had been stacked next to the wall. Robert Hardy stood up and realised to his amazement that he was unhurt. He looked across to see Edward Fox stand up, "turn completely green and collapse in a heap", having broken five ribs and his shoulder blade. He noticed that Scofield was lying very still on the ground "and I saw that his shin-bone was sticking out through his trousers". As the film takes place in October during the partridge-shooting season, the filmmakers had to make a choice whether to delay filming for a year or re-cast. The Shooting Party schedule was ultimately changed to allow James Mason to take over the part of Sir Randolph Nettleby six weeks later. Scofield's broken leg also deprived him of the part of O'Brien in Nineteen Eighty-Four, in which he was replaced by Richard Burton.

Helen Mirren, who appeared with Scofield in the 1989 film When the Whales Came, said, "He aspires to the soul rather than the character. He has no sense of personal ambition. He's one of our great, great actors. We're lucky to have him." Scofield also portrayed the Ghost in Franco Zeffirelli's 1990 film adaptation of Hamlet alongside Mel Gibson in the title role. Despite being an A-list actor at the time, Gibson, who had grown up idolising Scofield, compared the experience of performing Shakespeare alongside him to being "thrown into the ring with Mike Tyson". Scofield, on the other hand, never felt similarly intimidated and later recalled about working with Gibson, "Not the actor you'd think would make an ideal Hamlet, but he had enormous integrity and intelligence." Scofield portrayed Professor Moroi in the film of János Nyíri's If Winter Comes (1980), for BBC Television; poet Mark Van Doren in Robert Redford's film Quiz Show (1994), and Deputy Governor Thomas Danforth in Nicholas Hytner's film adaptation (1996) of Arthur Miller's The Crucible.

== Personal life and death ==
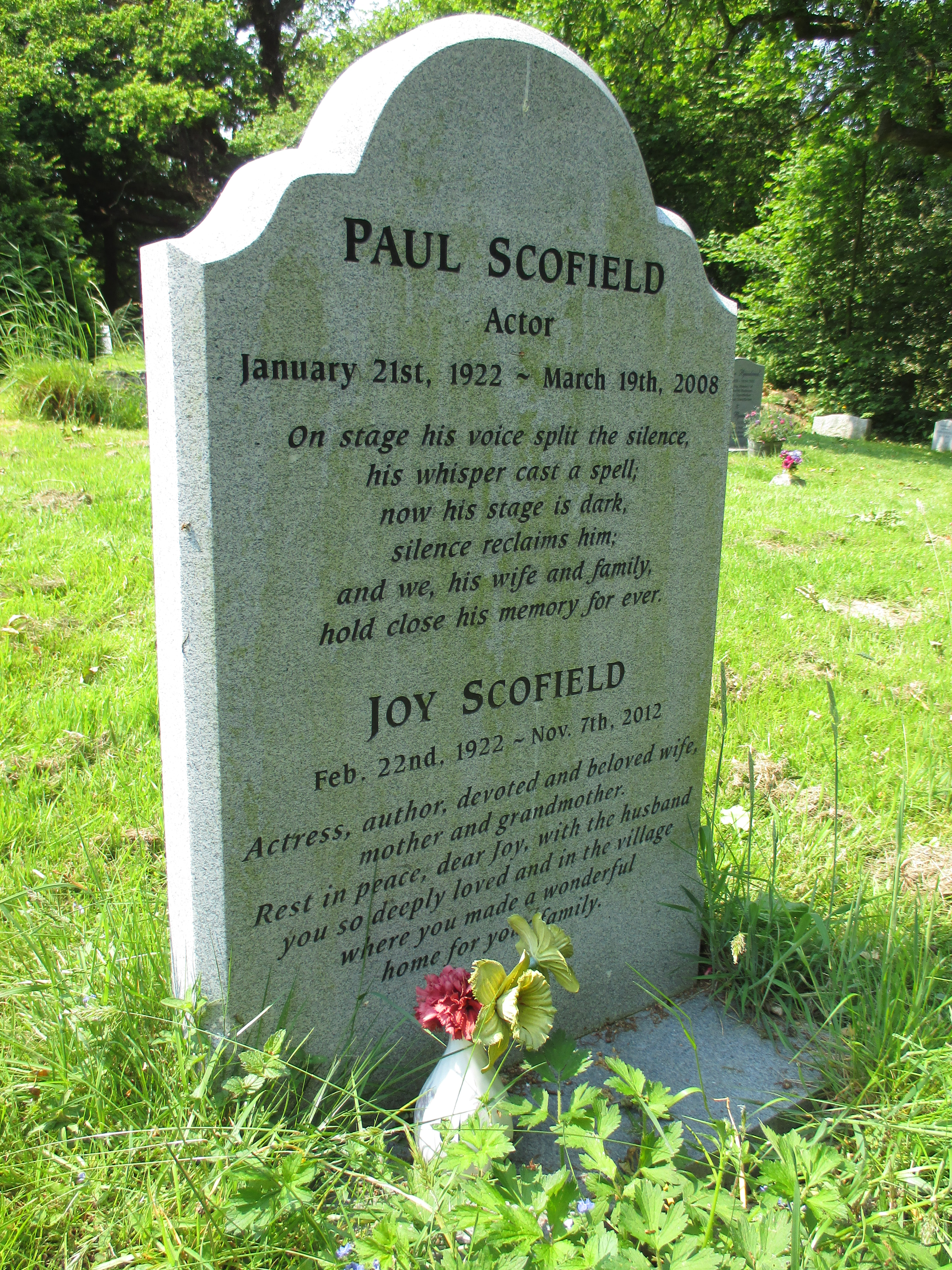
Paul and Joy Scofield's gravestone in St Mary's churchyard, Balcombe, West Sussex

Scofield married actress Joy Mary Parker on 15 May 1943. They had met while he played Hamlet to her Ophelia. Scofield later said "Joy and I simply decided to be married. We were both of age and were determined. Any doubts from our families were overruled, and they were the usual ones – too young, etc. We had a week out at the end of The Moon Is Down tour, married during that week, and went straight into the Whitehall Theatre."

Paul and Joy Scofield had two children: Martin (born 1945) who became a senior lecturer in English and American literature at the University of Kent and Sarah (born 1951). When asked by Garry O'Connor how he wished to be remembered, Scofield responded "If you have a family, that is how to be remembered." When O'Connor asked about his seventieth birthday, Scofield replied, "Birthdays are a bore, really. It's true, I do like my fallow times... I hate missing anything that might be happening outside on a summer evening, something in the garden." Filmmaker Michael Winner accordingly described Paul and Joy Scofield as "one of the few very happily married couples I've ever met."

Scofield died from leukaemia on 19 March 2008 at the age of 86 at the Royal Sussex County Hospital in Brighton, East Sussex, England. His memorial service was held at Westminster Abbey on the first anniversary of his death. His wife Joy died four years later on 7 November 2012, aged 90.

== Filmography ==
=== Film ===
Year	Title	Role	Director	Notes
1955	That Lady	King Philip II of Spain	Terence Young	
1958	Carve Her Name with Pride	Tony Fraser	Lewis Gilbert	
1964	The Train	Col. von Waldheim	John Frankenheimer	
1966	A Man for All Seasons	Sir Thomas More	Fred Zinnemann	
1968	Tell Me Lies	Guest	Peter Brook	
1969	The Red Tent	The Main Judge	Mikhail Kalatozov	Uncredited
1970	Bartleby	The Accountant	Anthony Friedman	
1970	Nijinsky: Unfinished Project	Sergei Diaghilev	Tony Richardson	
1971	King Lear	King Lear	Peter Brook	
1973	Scorpio	Zharkov	Michael Winner	
1973	A Delicate Balance	Tobias	Tony Richardson	
1983	Ill Fares the Land	Narrator	Bill Bryden	Voice
1984	Summer Lightning	Old Robert Clarke	Paul Joyce	
1985	1919	Alexander Scherbatov	Hugh Brody	
1989	When the Whales Came	Zachariah "The Birdman" Woodcock	Clive Reeves	
1989	Henry V	Charles VI of France	Kenneth Branagh	
1990	Hamlet	The Ghost	Franco Zeffirelli	
1992	Utz	Doctor Vaclav Orlik	George Sluizer	
1992	London	Narrator	Patrick Keiller	
1994	Quiz Show	Mark Van Doren	Robert Redford	
1996	The Crucible	Judge Thomas Danforth	Nicholas Hytner	
1997	Robinson in Space	Narrator	Patrick Keiller	
1999	Animal Farm	Boxer	John Stephenson	Voice
1999	Rashi: A Light After the Dark Ages	Ashley Lazarus		Voice

=== Television ===
Year	Title	Role	Notes	Ref.
1965	The State Funeral of Sir Winston Churchill	Narrator	ITV television special	
1969	Male of the Species	Sir Emlyn Bowen	Television movie	
1977	The Ambassadors	Lewis Lambert Strether	Television movie	
1980	If Winter Comes	Professor Moroi	Television movie	
1980	The Curse of King Tut's Tomb	Narrator	Voice; Television movie	
1981	Celebrity Playhouse	James Callifer	Episode: The Potting Shed	
1982	A Song at Twilight	Sir Hugh Latymer		
1984	Arena: The Life and Times of Don Luis Buñuel	Narrator		
1985	Anna Karenina	Aleksei Karenin	Television Movie	
1987	Mister Corbett's Ghost	Mr. Corbett	Television movie	
1988	The Attic: The Hiding of Anne Frank	Otto Frank	Television movie	
1994	Genesis: The Creation and the Flood	Narrator	Voice	
1994	Martin Chuzzlewit	Old Martin Chuzzlewit; Anthony Chuzzlewit	6 episodes	
1999	The Disabled Century	Narrator	Voice; 3 episodes	

== Sound recordings ==
Scofield can be heard on Caedmon Records productions of Hamlet, A Midsummer Night's Dream, Twelfth Night, T.S. Eliot's The Family Reunion and Murder in the Cathedral, and an adaptation of A Christmas Carol.

== Awards and honours ==
Year	Award	Category	Nominated work	Result	Ref.
1966	Academy Awards	Best Actor	A Man for All Seasons	Won	
1994	Academy Awards	Best Supporting Actor	Quiz Show	Nominated	
1971	Bodil Awards	Best Actor	King Lear	Won	
1955	British Academy Film Awards	Most Promising Newcomer to Film	That Lady	Won	
1967	British Academy Film Awards	Best British Actor	A Man for All Seasons	Won	
1994	British Academy Film Awards	Best Actor in a Supporting Role	Quiz Show	Nominated	
1996	British Academy Film Awards	Best Actor in a Supporting Role	The Crucible	Won	
1994	British Academy Television Awards	Best Actor	Martin Chuzzlewit	Nominated	
1994	Dallas–Fort Worth Film Critics Association Awards	Best Supporting Actor	Quiz Show	Nominated	
1966	Golden Globe Awards	Best Actor in a Motion Picture – Drama	A Man for All Seasons	Won	
1996	Golden Globe Awards	Best Supporting Actor – Motion Picture	The Crucible	Nominated	
1967	Grammy Awards	Best Spoken Word, Documentary or Drama Recording	A Man for All Seasons	Nominated	
1968	Grammy Awards	Best Spoken Word Recording	Murder in the Cathedral	Nominated	
1966	Kansas City Film Critics Circle Awards	Best Actor	A Man for All Seasons	Won (Note: Tied with Rod Steiger for In the Heat of the Night.)	
1966	Laurel Awards	Top Male Dramatic Performance	A Man for All Seasons	Nominated	
1980	Laurence Olivier Awards	Actor of the Year in a New Play	Amadeus	Nominated	
1986	Laurence Olivier Awards	Best Comedy Performance	I'm Not Rappaport	Nominated	
1993	Laurence Olivier Awards	Best Actor	Heartbreak House	Nominated	
1997	Laurence Olivier Awards	Best Actor	John Gabriel Borkman	Nominated	
1997	London Film Critics Circle Awards	Lifetime Achievement Award	—N/a	Won	
1966	Moscow International Film Festival	Best Actor	A Man for All Seasons	Won	
1966	National Board of Review Awards	Best Actor	A Man for All Seasons	Won	
1966	National Society of Film Critics Awards	Best Actor	A Man for All Seasons	4th Place	
1994	National Society of Film Critics Awards	Best Supporting Actor	Quiz Show	3rd Place	
1966	New York Film Critics Circle Awards	Best Actor	A Man for All Seasons	Won	
1994	New York Film Critics Circle Awards	Best Supporting Actor	Quiz Show	Nominated	
1969	Primetime Emmy Awards	Outstanding Single Performance by an Actor in a Leading Role	Male of the Species	Won	
1996	Satellite Awards	Best Actor in a Supporting Role – Drama	The Crucible	Nominated	
1996	Southeastern Film Critics Association Awards	Best Supporting Actor	The Crucible	Runner-up	
1962	Tony Awards	Best Leading Actor in a Play	A Man for All Seasons	Won	

Scofield declined the honour of a knighthood on three occasions, but was appointed Commander of the Order of the British Empire (CBE) in the 1956 New Year Honours, and became a Member of the Order of the Companions of Honour in 2001. When asked the reason for his decision to decline the knighthood, Scofield responded, "I have every respect for people who are offered [a knighthood] and accept it gratefully. It is just not an aspect of life that I would want." His biographer Garry O'Connor described being knighted as "the kind of honour from which [Scofield] instinctively recoiled. Never the actor before the part he plays."

In 1972, the Hamburg-based Alfred Toepfer Foundation awarded Scofield its annual Shakespeare Prize. When Scofield was nominated for the Academy Award for Best Actor for A Man for All Seasons, he declined to travel to Los Angeles to attend the ceremony. When Scofield won the award, his leading lady Wendy Hiller, whom Fred Zinnemann had cast as Lady Alice More for being "particularly marvelous at doing a 'slow burn'", went up on stage to receive the Award Statue on Scofield's behalf. According to O'Connor, Scofield always kept his Oscar Statue "put... away in the corner of his workroom". Scofield explained, "Although it was nice to get, it's not decorative, really. I suppose that's why I don't display it. But if anyone wants to see it I'll get it out." Scofield was subsequently nominated as Best Supporting Actor for Quiz Show.

Scofield's many theatrical accolades include a 1962 Tony Award for A Man for All Seasons. In 1969, Scofield became the sixth performer to win the Triple Crown of Acting, winning an Emmy Award for Outstanding Single Performance by an Actor in a Leading Role for Male of the Species. He accomplished this in only seven years (1962–1969), which is still a record. He was also one of only eleven actors to win both the Tony and the Oscar for the same role on stage and film, for A Man for All Seasons. In 2002 he was awarded the honorary degree of D. Litt by the University of Oxford.

In 2004, a poll of actors of the Royal Shakespeare Company, including Ian McKellen, Donald Sinden, Janet Suzman, Ian Richardson, Antony Sher and Corin Redgrave, acclaimed Scofield's Lear as the greatest Shakespearean performance ever. Scofield appeared in many radio dramas for BBC Radio 4, including in later years plays by Peter Tinniswood: On the Train to Chemnitz (2001) and Anton in Eastbourne (2002). The latter was Tinniswood's last work and was written especially for Scofield, an admirer of Anton Chekhov. He was awarded the 2002 Sam Wanamaker Prize.

== Discography ==
Paul Scofield led the cast in several dramas issued by Caedmon Records:

- King Lear, directed by Howard Sackler (Text edited by G.B. Harrison), with Pamela Brown (Goneril), Rachel Roberts (Regan), Ann Bell (Cordelia); Wallace Eaton (France), John Rogers (Burgundy), Trevor Martin (Cornwall), Michael Aldridge (Albany), Andrew Keir (Kent), Cyril Cusack (Gloucester), Robert Stephens (Edgar), John Stride (Edmund), Ronnie Stevens (Fool); Arthur Hewlett (Curan, Doctor), Ronald Ibbs (Gentleman, Knight), Willoughby Goddard (Oswald). Eight sides, SRS 233 (first published 1965).
- Hamlet, directed by Howard Sackler, (Unabridged), with Diana Wynyard (Queen), Roland Culver (Claudius), Donald Houston (Laertes), Zena Walker (Ophelia), Wilfrid Lawson. Eight sides, SRS 232 (first published 1963).
- A Midsummer Night's Dream, directed by Howard Sackler, with Barbara Jefford, Joy Parker, John Stride, etc. Six sides, SRS 208 (first published 1964).
- T.S. Eliot, The Family Reunion, with Flora Robson, Sybil Thorndike, Alan Webb. Six sides, TRS 308.
- Charles Dickens, A Christmas Carol, with Ralph Richardson as Scrooge. Scofield only narrated. (Caedmon)
- T.S. Eliot, Murder in the Cathedral, full-cast recording of the play, directed by Howard Sackler, Scofield as Thomas a Becket, with Cyril Cusack, Julian Glover, Michael Gwynn, Alec McCowen, Geoffrey Dunn, Anthony Nicholls, Patrick Magee, Harry Andrews, Douglas Wilmer, James Hayter, Michael Aldridge, Cathleen Nesbitt, Glenda Jackson, Wendy Hiller, June Jago, Stephen Moore. Caedmon 1968 [TRS-330; LC R68-3173]

Also:

- Homage to T.S. Eliot, with Laurence Olivier, John Le Mesurier, Cleo Laine, Bernard Cribbins, George Devine, Alec McGowen, Anna Quayle, Clive Revill, Ian Richardson, and Nicol Williamson (1965)
- King Lear, with Harriet Walter (Goneril), Sara Kestelman (Regan), Emilia Fox (Cordelia), Alec McCowen (Gloucester), Kenneth Branagh (Fool), David Burke, Richard A. McCabe, Toby Stephens, etc. Released 2002 to coincide with Scofield's 80th birthday. (Naxos Audiobooks, 3-CD set).
- Virgil, The Aeneid, Paul Scofield (narrator), Jill Balcon and Toby Stephens (readers). (Naxos Audiobook CD).
- T.S. Eliot, The Waste Land and Four Quartets (BBC Radiobooks CD).
- Sandor Marai, Embers (Penguin Audiobooks) – Narrator
- With David Suchet and Ron Moody, Scofield led the cast of a radio dramatization of the Narnia books by C.S. Lewis, made available as CD issues. (Tynedale Entertainment) – Narrator
- Scofield recorded abridged readings of Dickens's A Christmas Carol and Bleak House (Blackstone Audiobooks).
- Façade (Sitwell-Walton), performed by Paul Scofield and Peggy Ashcroft, with London Sinfonietta conducted by William Walton. (Argo Records, 1972).
- Don Quixote: The Musical, with Roy Hudd as Sancho Panza. Based on Purcell and D'Urfey's The Comical History of Don Quixote. Later released on CD (Musica Oscura, 1994).

(For a more exhaustive list, see this note:)

== See also ==
- List of Academy Award winners and nominees from Great Britain
- List of actors in Royal Shakespeare Company productions
- List of actors with Academy Award nominations
- List of actors with more than one Academy Award nomination in the acting categories
- List of British actors
- List of Golden Globe winners
- List of people who have declined a British honour
- List of Primetime Emmy Award winners
- List of Royal National Theatre Company actors
