= Jocelyne LaGarde =

French Polynesian actor

- Tetuanuira
- Born: Jocelyne Bredin LaGarde; 24 April 1924; Papeete, Tahiti
- Died: 12 September 1979 (aged 55); Papeete, Tahiti
- Occupation: Actress
- Notable work: Hawaii
- Children: 1 (adopted)

Jocelyne Bredin LaGarde (24 April 1924 – 12 September 1979) was a indigenous Tahitian actress who became famous for her first and only acting role in the 1966 motion picture, Hawaii, for which she was nominated for an Academy Award for Best Supporting Actress.

== Biography ==
The film Hawaii was a big-budget drama based on the best-selling novel of the same name by James A. Michener that tells the story of 19th-century white missionaries bringing Christianity to the island natives. LaGarde was a Polynesian woman who fit perfectly the physical attributes of an important character in the film. Although she had never acted before, and could not speak English (speaking only fluent Tahitian and French), she was hired by Mirisch Productions and given a coach who taught her enough English to handle her character's dialogue.

As "Queen Malama Kanakoa, Aliʻi Nui of Hawaii", LaGarde's personality and facial beauty, combined with a reported 300-pound (140 kg) frame, brought a commanding presence to the screen. Surrounded by a cast of Hollywood all-stars, she stole the show not only with the audience but with the professional members of the film industry. The Academy of Motion Picture Arts and Sciences nominated her for the Academy Award for Best Supporting Actress, the only performer in the film so nominated. She was the first Polynesian and first Indigenous person ever nominated for an Academy Award. LaGarde remains to date the only actor ever nominated for an Academy Award for her only film appearance. A number of other actors have been nominated, some successfully, for their debut film performances, but all of them have gone on to make other films. The Hollywood Foreign Press Association voted her the winner of their Golden Globe Award for Best Supporting Actress. Hawaii was LaGarde's only acting role. In 1972, she traveled back to Honolulu to receive medical treatment for complications of diabetes which resulted in the amputation of one foot. She died at her home in Papeete, Tahiti, in 1979, without a reported cause of death.
