= Hawaii (1966 film) =

1966 film by George Roy Hill

- original 1966 Spanish language film poster
- Directed by: George Roy Hill
- Screenplay by: Daniel Taradash; Dalton Trumbo
- Based on: Hawaii by James A. Michener
- Produced by: Walter Mirisch
- Starring: Julie Andrews; Max von Sydow; Richard Harris
- Cinematography: Russell Harlan
- Edited by: Stuart Gilmore
- Music by: Elmer Bernstein
- Production company: The Mirisch Corporation
- Distributed by: United Artists
- Release date: October 10, 1966
- Running time: 188 minutes (Roadshow release); 161 minutes (General release)
- Country: United States
- Language: English
- Budget: $15 million
- Box office: $34.5 million

Hawaii is a 1966 American epic drama film directed by George Roy Hill. It is based on the eponymous 1959 novel by James A. Michener. It tells the story of an 1820s divinity student from Yale University who, accompanied by his new bride, becomes a Calvinist missionary in the Hawaiian Islands. It was filmed at Old Sturbridge Village, in Sturbridge, Massachusetts, and on the islands of Kauai and Oahu in Hawaii.

The film was released on October 10, 1966. It received mixed to favorable reviews but was a box-office success. It received seven nominations at the 39th Academy Awards, including Best Supporting Actress (for Jocelyne LaGarde).

== Plot ==
In 1819, Prince Keoki Kanakoa appeals to the Yale Divinity School to bring Christianity to the Hawaiian Islands. Among the volunteers is newly ordained Reverend Abner Hale, who is required to be married before embarking on the mission. Reverend Thorn introduces Abner to his young niece, Jerusha Bromley, who is in love with Captain Rafer Hoxworth, a whaler currently away at sea. Believing Hoxworth has forgotten her, Jerusha agrees to marry Abner after a brief courtship.

The couple, along with other missionaries and Keoki, sail to Lahaina on the island of Maui. They are shocked by what they see as the sinful ways of the islanders, including the practice of incest among the royal family. Keoki’s father, Kelolo, is both the husband and biological brother of Keoki's mother, Malama Kanakoa, the ruler of the island. This incestuous tradition is meant to preserve the royal bloodline, and Keoki, despite wanting to become a minister, is expected to marry his sister, Noelani, who is next in line to rule.

While other missionaries sail to Honolulu, the Hales remain in Lahaina, living in a grass hut as they work to build a church. Jerusha takes an active role in helping the natives, including efforts to end the practice of infanticide after rescuing a baby with a facial birthmark. After a challenging labor, she gives birth to a son, Micah. During a stopover in one of his whaling voyages, Rafer Hoxworth discovers Jerusha’s marriage to Abner and, filled with jealousy, threatens to kill Abner. Despite the tension, Abner baptizes his first convert, a young Hawaiian girl named Iliki, who was given to the Hales as a servant.

Malama agrees to learn about Christianity but resists conversion, knowing it would require her to send Kelolo away. At the Hales' insistence, Malama imposes a curfew on sailors and forbids them from fraternizing with native women, inciting a riot among the sailors. Hoxworth tries to convince Jerusha to leave with him, but she refuses. When the sailors retaliate by partially burning the church, the Hawaiians come to the Hales’ aid, driving the sailors back to their ships. In a final act of vengeance, Hoxworth entices Iliki to leave the island with him and throws Abner overboard when he attempts to retrieve her. Attacked by a shark, Abner is left permanently lame.

Years later, Abner reveals to Keoki that he will never be ordained as a minister because he is not white, offering him instead the role of deacon to oversee the natives' activities. Keoki refuses, straining their friendship and renouncing Christianity. On her deathbed, Malama agrees to be baptized as a Christian and renounces Kelolo as her husband. As the natives foretold, a strong gale strikes the town and destroys the church upon Malama’s death.

Noelani becomes the new Ali'i Nui and marries Keoki. Abner crashes the wedding, discovering that Malama’s conversion was only for the good of her people. As Kelolo departs for Bora Bora with Malama’s heart, Abner prays for divine retribution to punish the natives. When Noelani and Keoki’s child is born severely deformed, Abner sees it as God's punishment and refuses Jerusha’s pleas to save the infant. Keoki drowns the child, and soon after, a measles outbreak devastates the native population, killing hundreds, including Keoki, who dies denouncing God.

Jerusha’s years of toil and childbearing take a toll on her health, leading to her early death. Devastated, Abner becomes more compassionate toward the Hawaiians, even joining them in opposing settlers and plantation owners from seizing more land. When the other ministers vote to profit from the land, Abner refuses and is reassigned to Connecticut. He stays in Hawaii, sending his children to New England. Returning to his hut, Abner is greeted by a young Hawaiian man who wishes to be his assistant. Abner is overjoyed when he realizes the man is the disfigured infant Jerusha had saved from drowning years before.

== Cast ==
- Julie Andrews as Jerusha Bromley Hale
- Max von Sydow as Reverend Abner Hale
- Richard Harris as Capt. Rafer Hoxworth
- Gene Hackman as Dr. John Whipple
- Carroll O'Connor as Charles Bromley
- Jocelyne LaGarde as Aliʻi Nui, Malama Kanakoa
- Manu Tupou as Prince Keoki Kanakoa, narrator in the prologue
- Ted Nobriga as Prince Kelolo Kanakoa
- Elizabeth Logue as Noelani Kanakoa
- John Cullum as Rev. Immanuel Quigley
- George Rose as Capt. Janders
- Lou Antonio as Rev. Abraham Hewlett
- Torin Thatcher as Rev. Dr. Thorn
- Michael Constantine as Mason, sailor
- Malcolm Atterbury as Gideon Hale
- Diane Sherry as Charity Bromley
- Lokelani S. Chicarell as Iliki
- Robert Oakley as Micah Hale at age 4
- Henrik von Sydow as Micah Hale at age 7
- Claes von Sydow as Micah Hale at age 12
- Bertil Weriefelt as Micah Hale at age 18

Bette Midler also had her first on-screen movie appearance as an extra in the film (she can be seen behind a woman covered in a white shawl during Abner's sermon). Heather Menzies (who co-starred with Andrews in The Sound of Music a year earlier) appears as Jerusha's sister Mercy Bromley. Claes von Sydow and his younger brother Henrik are Max's real-life sons. The film's costume designer Dorothy Jeakins makes a credited cameo as the Hales matriarch Hepzibah Hale.

== Production ==
The film was based on the book's third chapter (out of six), entitled From the Farm of Bitterness, which covered the settlement of the island kingdom by its first American missionaries. There are some differences between the novel's third chapter and the film, such as Abner, who was already lame at the time they landed in Lahaina, the riots had already started before Malama enforces laws in the Island, Urania Hewlett's difficult childbirth was changed into Jerusha's, Rafer's character was introduced earlier in the novel (before the missionaries landed in Hawaii), and the whistling wind scene was more chaotic in the novel than in the film (several whaling ships sank) and occurred the day after Malama's funeral. Other key scenes (such as Rafer bombarding Lahaina and damaging the Fort and the Mission House) were omitted for the film.

Needing a Polynesian female for the key role of Malama, the Alii Nui, the producers hired a native Tahitian for the role. French-speaking Jocelyne LaGarde had never acted before and could not speak English; however, her screen test showed a powerful presence, and the producers hired a coach to train her phonetically to handle the character's dialogue. Of the all-star cast, LaGarde would be the only one to earn an Academy Award nomination and the only one to win a Golden Globe Award. Making early screen appearances in this film were Bette Midler, John Cullum, and future Oscar winner Gene Hackman.

Originally, it was to be directed by Fred Zinnemann, and intending to cast Audrey Hepburn and Alec Guinness as leads. But Zinnemann had fought with United Artists a few years before the film was made and left the production to go to England, to work on A Man for All Seasons. Director George Roy Hill was subsequently asked to work on the film, which he agreed to do, and the film became the only epic he directed. To cast the lead roles, Julie Andrews, fresh from her role as the titular character in Mary Poppins, signed in December 1964 while Max Von Sydow and Richard Harris on February and March 1965 respectively. The film would also feature appearances from Henrik von Sydow and Claes von Sydow, the real sons of star Max von Sydow, who play Abner's son Micah at different ages.

The film was filmed in various locations throughout Oahu in the state of Hawaii, the perfect replica of Lahaina during the 1820s is built on Makua Beach and the surrounding Makua Valley. Despite the Hawaiian setting and filming locations, a significant portion of the props used in the film were imported from Mexico, Taiwan, Ireland, Hong Kong, Japan, and the Philippines.

Principal photography began in April 1965, on location in Old Sturbridge Village for scenes set in Walpole, New Hampshire and the Hales' farm (interiors were filmed in Hollywood soundstages for seven weeks, along with scenes set in Yale College and on board the Thetis). Then on location in the island of Oahu in Hawaii in June. Location filming in Oahu bogged down with heavy rain and tidal wave alerts, which caused the budget to balloon to over $10 million; despite this producer Walter Mirisch sacked Hill as director, and intended to hire Arthur Hiller as director. Polynesian extras protested and refused to work with another director, so Hill was hired back. Principal photography ended in November 1965.

Andrews received top billing around the world except in continental Europe, where Sydow's contract stipulated that he receive first and same line billing.

== Release ==
Hawaii had its premiere at the DeMille Theatre in New York City on October 10, 1966. It also opened the same week at the Egyptian Theatre in Los Angeles. It expanded into five further cities the following week, including Honolulu, and another three the following week.

=== Availability of different versions ===
The film as originally released ran 189 minutes (including overture, intermission, entr'acte, and exit music). This roadshow version would be issued on VHS and LaserDisc from the best available elements. For general release, this was then subsequently cut by United Artists to 161 minutes and is the version seen on the 2005 DVD release from MGM Home Video (as the best elements suitable for DVD came from the general release). Both versions have been broadcast on Turner Classic Movies and This TV Network.

On October 9, 2015, Twilight Time Movies announced on the Home Theater Forum that they would release a Blu-ray edition of Hawaii (along with The Hawaiians) on January 19, 2016. The Hawaiians would be released the next month on February 9, 2016. The Hawaii Blu-ray has both the long and short versions, but the long, original version is in standard definition and not anamorphic widescreen.

== Reception ==
=== Critical reception ===
The film's critical response was mixed to favorable. Vincent Canby of The New York Times wrote that "one comes out the theater not so much moved as numbed — by the cavalcade of conventional if sometimes eyepopping scenes of storm and seascape, of pomp and pestilence, all laid out in large strokes of brilliant De Luxe color on the huge Panavision screen." Arthur D. Murphy of Variety stated, "Superior production, acting and direction give depth and credibility to a personal tragedy, set against the clash of two civilizations." Philip K. Scheuer of the Los Angeles Times wrote that even at three hours in length, the filmmakers "still haven't given themselves enough leeway" to adapt Michener's epic novel, but "'Hawaii' will still be one of the outstanding Hollywood pictures of 1966."

Time magazine felt that "Instead of portraying the death of one culture and the birth of another, he [George Roy Hill] has restricted himself to the story of one man and his ministry. The spectator is rather too frequently allowed to feel that he is watching a rather small film on a very large screen and to wonder, with a mounting sense of lumbar crisis, why he must pay advanced prices $2.25 to $4.25) for the privilege of sitting through a 3 1/2-hour story that could have been told just as well in two." Richard L. Coe of The Washington Post found the romance between Abner and Jerusha "more trite than credible" and wrote that Max von Sydow "seems to have based his concept of the leading role on a quick course in Roots of Modern America." Brendan Gill of The New Yorker called it "perhaps the biggest empty movie, or the emptiest big movie, ever made. Despite its length and its look of being extremely ambitious, it contains scarcely a single action worth dramatizing." The Monthly Film Bulletin praised the "intelligent and literate" script and "deeply felt performances from the whole cast," but felt "a distinct slackening of interest" after the intermission, as once Malama dies "there is little left except for Jerusha to join her. The real drama is over, and a colorful local wedding hardly compensates for the lack of tension."

The film holds a score of 70% on Rotten Tomatoes based on 10 reviews.

=== Box office ===
After expanding to 10 cities, Hawaii reached number one at the US box office. In its first seven weeks of release, it had grossed $1,545,688. The film grossed $34.5 million in North America, making it the highest-grossing film of 1966. It went on to earn $15.6 million in theatrical rentals.

=== Accolades ===
Award	Category	Nominee(s)	Result
Academy Awards	Best Supporting Actress	Jocelyne LaGarde	Nominated
Academy Awards	Best Cinematography – Color	Russell Harlan	Nominated
Academy Awards	Best Costume Design – Color	Dorothy Jeakins	Nominated
Academy Awards	Best Original Music Score	Elmer Bernstein	Nominated
Academy Awards	Best Song	"My Wishing Doll"; Music by Elmer Bernstein; Lyrics by Mack David	Nominated
Academy Awards	Best Sound	Gordon E. Sawyer	Nominated
Academy Awards	Best Special Visual Effects	Linwood G. Dunn	Nominated
Golden Globe Awards	Best Actor in a Motion Picture – Drama	Max von Sydow	Nominated
Golden Globe Awards	Best Supporting Actress – Motion Picture	Jocelyne LaGarde	Won
Golden Globe Awards	Best Original Score – Motion Picture	Elmer Bernstein	Won
Laurel Awards	Top Song	"My Wishing Doll"; Music by Elmer Bernstein; Lyrics by Mack David	Nominated
National Society of Film Critics Awards	Best Actor	Max von Sydow	Nominated

The film is recognized by American Film Institute in these lists:

- 2005: AFI's 100 Years of Film Scores – Nominated

== See also ==
- George Roy Hill filmography
- List of American films of 1966
- "Hawaii" (Elmer Bernstein song), the theme song from the film.
- The Hawaiians, a 1970 sequel, which covered later chapters of James Michener's book
- Hawaiian religion
- Kapu, the ancient Hawaiian code of conduct of laws and regulations
- Ancient Hawaii
- Carthaginian, the 1921 ship converted to a square-rigged whaler for the film

== Bibliography ==
- Balio, Tino (1987). United Artists: The Company That Changed the Film Industry. University of Wisconsin Press. ISBN 978-0-299-11440-4.
- Horton, Andrew (2005). The Films of George Roy Hill (Revised ed.). Jefferson, North Carolina: McFarland & Company. ISBN 978-0-786-41931-9.
- Mirisch, Walter (2008). I Thought We Were Making Movies, Not History. University of Wisconsin Press. ISBN 978-0-299-22640-4.
