= London (1994 film) =

1994 film by Patrick Keiller

- Directed by: Patrick Keiller
- Produced by: Keith Griffiths
- Narrated by: Paul Scofield
- Distributed by: BFI; Channel 4
- Release date: June 3, 1994
- Running time: 1 hour 25 minutes
- Country: United Kingdom
- Language: English

London is a 1994 British essay film written and directed by Patrick Keiller, narrated by Paul Scofield.

== Content ==
The film consists of documentary images of London, with narration chronicling one year in the life of two fictional characters inhabiting the city. Paul Scofield's unnamed narrator has returned to London after a seven year absence, during which time he has worked as a photographer on a cruise ship. His narration recollects the actions of his reclusive, unseen friend and one-time lover Robinson. Named for the Daniel Defoe character, Robinson is an underemployed lecturer who is attempting to solve the "problem of London." Keiller's camera captures, and the narrator and Robinson are said to interact with, numerous real-life incidents which took place over the course of filming, including the re-election of Conservative Prime Minister John Major and the Baltic Exchange bombing.

The character's experiences of the city are structured through a series of three walks around London, taking in Vauxhall, Brixton Market, Brent Cross Shopping Centre, Putney, Clapham Common and Stoke Newington. The narration includes numerous quotations from and references to writers and thinkers who have lived in London, including Edgar Allan Poe, Charles Baudelaire and Arthur Rimbaud.

== Production ==
Keiller had produced several short films over the course of the 1980s, while working part-time as a lecturer in architecture at a polytechnic university. He was inspired by the writing of Alexander Herzen, and Chris Marker and Pierre Lhomme's Le Joli Mai, a documentary interviewing passers-by on the streets of Paris, to create his own film about London. The film was shot over the course of 11 months in 1992. Keiller has claimed that his initial pitch for funding, which came from the British Film Institute and Channel 4, was one page: a list of proposed shots, and some sample narration, the majority of which did not make it into the finished feature. There was no audio recorded during filming, with all the ambient sound, narration and music added in post-production.

== Release and reception ==
London was released on VHS in the UK on 23 January 1995 through Academy Video, and on DVD (with Robinson In Space) in the UK on 23 May 2005 through the British Film Institute.

The film received positive reviews upon release. Writing for The Independent, Sheila Johnston compared Keiller's work to that of Peter Greenaway, Humphrey Jennings and Chris Marker. Time Out included it in their 100 Best British Films of All Time.

== Legacy ==
The film has been cited as an example of psychogeography, although Keiller has distanced himself from the term "out of respect for the people who devised both the term and the practice in the 1950s." Nevertheless, the film has proven influential on practitioners of psychogeography such as Iain Sinclair.

Keiller produced two more films in the same style, again centering on the character of Robinson. Robinson in Space, released in 1997, saw Scofield returning as narrator to chronicle the characters' journey through the English provinces. The third and final film, Robinson in Ruins, was produced after Scofield's death, and saw Vanessa Redgrave taking over the role of narrator. Keiller brought back the title character again for "The Robinson Institute," an exhibition at Tate Britain which drew on over 120 works from the gallery's collection paired with his own films and photography to further explore the cultural history of British identity.

In 2020, the film's full script and select images were published as a book, also titled London, with an afterword and location notes from Keiller.
