= Patrick Keiller =

British film-maker, writer and lecturer (born 1950)

- Born: Blackpool, England
- Occupations: Architectural educator; film director
- Website: https://patrickkeiller.org/

Patrick Keiller (born 1950) is a British film-maker, writer and lecturer.

== Biography ==
Keiller was born in 1950, in Blackpool and studied at the Bartlett School of Architecture, University College London. In 1979 he joined the Royal College of Art's Department of Environmental Media as a postgraduate student. For a time he taught architecture at the University of East London and fine art at Middlesex University.

His first film was Stonebridge Park (1981) followed by Norwood (1983), The End (1986), Valtos (1987) and The Clouds (1989). These films are typified by their use of subjective camera and voice-over. This was a technique that was further refined in his longer films London (1994) and Robinson in Space (1997), both of which are narrated by an unnamed character (voiced by Paul Scofield) who accompanies his friend and onetime lover, the unseen Robinson, in a series of excursions around London. Robinson is involved with research into the "problems" of London and, in the second film, England. The films were described by cultural theorist Mark Fisher as a critique of the United Kingdom's economic landscape under the Conservative governments of 1979–1997. A third film, Robinson in Ruins was released in November 2010. It was one of the outcomes of a three-year research project entitled The Future of Landscape and the Moving Image. The actress Vanessa Redgrave assumed the role of narrator.

In 2000, Keiller completed The Dilapidated Dwelling. This film was made for television, but was never broadcast. It features the voice of Tilda Swinton, and its subject matter is the state of the UK's housing.

== Filmography ==
Source, unless specified:

Feature films

Year	Title
1994	London
1997	Robinson In Space
2000	The Dilapidated Dwelling
2010	Robinson In Ruins

Short films

Year	Title
1981	Stonebridge Park
1984	Norwood
1986	The End
1987	Valtos or The Veil
1989	The Clouds

== Bibliography ==
=== By Patrick Keiller ===
- Robinson in Space (Reaktion Books 1999)
- The View from the Train: Cities and Other Landscapes (Verso 2013)
- London (FUEL 2020)

=== About Patrick Keiller ===
- Christie, Ian, "The Man on the Ealing Tram: Retro Futures and Patrick Keiller's The City of the Future at the BFI Gallery" in Elisabetta Fabrizi, ed., The BFI Gallery Book (BFI 2011)
