= Anouk Aimée =

French actress (1932–2024)

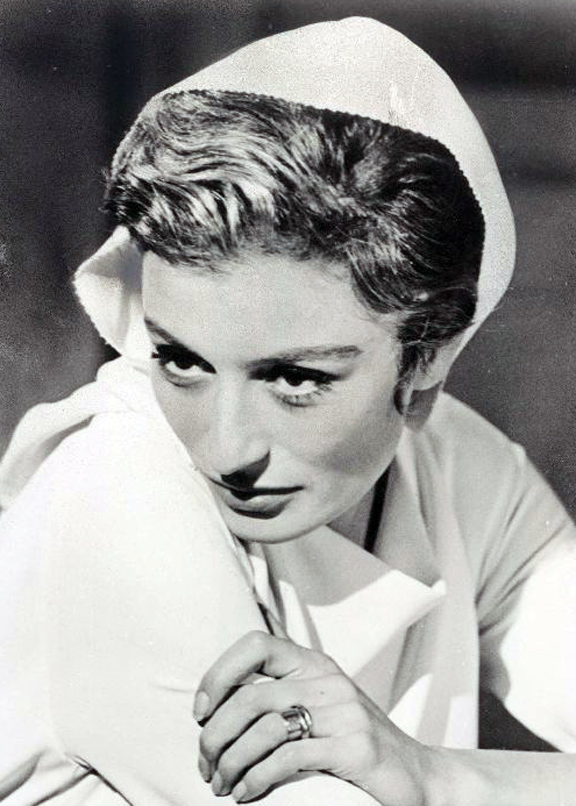
- Aimée in 1963
- Born: Nicole Françoise Florence Dreyfus; 27 April 1932; Paris, France
- Died: 18 June 2024 (aged 92); Paris, France
- Resting place: Saint-Vincent Cemetery, 18th arrondissement of Paris
- Occupation: Actress
- Years active: 1947–2019
- Spouses: Edouard Zimmermann (m. 1949; div. 1950) Nikos Papatakis (m. 1951; div. 1954) Pierre Barouh (m. 1966; div. 1969) Albert Finney (m. 1970; div. 1978)
- Children: 1
- Parents: Henry Murray (father); Geneviève Sorya (mother)

Nicole Françoise Florence Dreyfus (French pronunciation: [nikɔl fʁɑ̃swaz flɔʁɑ̃s dʁɛfys]; 27 April 1932 – 18 June 2024), known professionally as Anouk Aimée (French: [anuk ɛme]) or Anouk, was a French film actress who appeared in 70 films from 1947 until 2019. Having begun her film career at age 14, she studied acting and dance in her early years, besides her regular education. Although the majority of her films were French, she also made films in Spain, the United Kingdom, Italy and Germany, along with some American productions.

Among her films are Federico Fellini's La dolce vita (1960), after which she was considered a "rising star who exploded" onto the film world. She subsequently acted in Fellini's 8½ (1963), Jacques Demy's Lola (1961), George Cukor's Justine (1969), Bernardo Bertolucci's Tragedy of a Ridiculous Man (1981), and Robert Altman's Prêt à Porter (1994). She won the Golden Globe Award for Best Actress in a Motion Picture – Drama and the BAFTA Award for Best Actress and was nominated for the Academy Award for Best Actress for her acting in A Man and a Woman (1966). The film "virtually reignited the lush on-screen romance in an era of skeptical modernism", and brought her international fame.

She won the Award for Best Actress at the Cannes Film Festival for Marco Bellocchio's film A Leap in the Dark (1980). In 2002, she received an honorary César Award, France's national film award. Aimée was known for her "striking features" and beauty, and considered "one of the hundred sexiest stars in film history", according to a 1995 poll conducted by Empire magazine. She often portrayed a femme fatale with a melancholy aura. In the 1960s, Life magazine commented: "after each picture her enigmatic beauty lingered" in the memories of her audience, and called her "the Left Bank's most beautiful resident".

== Early years ==
Aimée was born in Paris to actor Henry Murray (born Henri Dreyfus; 30 January 1907 – 29 January 1984) and actress Geneviève Sorya (née Durand; 23 June 1912 – 23 March 2008). According to one historian, although some have speculated that her background may be related to Captain Alfred Dreyfus, this has never been confirmed. Her father was Jewish, whereas her mother was Roman Catholic. She was raised Catholic but later converted to Judaism as an adult.

Her early education took place at l'École de la rue Milton, in Paris; École de Barbezieux; Pensionnat de Bandol; and Institution de Megève. She studied dance at Marseille Opera. During World War II she was a pupil at Mayfield School, East Sussex, but left before taking final exams. She studied theatre in England, after which she studied dramatic art and dance with Andrée Bauer-Thérond.

== Career ==
Aimée (then still Françoise Dreyfus) made her film debut, at the age of 14, in the role of Anouk in La Maison sous la mer (The House Under the Sea, 1946), and she kept the name afterwards. Jacques Prévert, while writing Les amants de Vérone (The Lovers of Verona, 1949) specifically for her, suggested she take the symbolic last name Aimée, "that would forever associate her with the affective power of her screen roles." In French, it means "beloved."

Among her films were Alexandre Astruc's The Crimson Curtain (Le Rideau Cramoisi, 1953), Federico Fellini's La Dolce Vita (1960), Fellini's 8½ (1963), Jacques Demy's Lola (1961), André Delvaux's One Night... A Train (Un Soir, un Train, 1968), George Cukor's Justine (1969), Bernardo Bertolucci's Tragedy of a Ridiculous Man (1981), Robert Altman's Prêt à Porter (Ready to Wear, 1994), and Claude Lelouch's A Man and a Woman (Un Homme et une femme, 1966) — described as a "film that virtually reignited the lush on-screen romance in an era of skeptical modernism." Words like "regal," "intelligent", and "enigmatic" are frequently associated with her, notes one author, giving Aimée "an aura of disturbing and mysterious beauty" that earned her the status of "one of the hundred sexiest stars in film history," according to a 1995 poll conducted by Empire Magazine.

Because of her "striking features" and her beauty, she has been compared to Jacqueline Kennedy. Film historian Ginette Vincendeau has commented that Aimée's films "established her as an ethereal, sensitive and fragile beauty with a tendency to tragic destinies or restrained suffering."

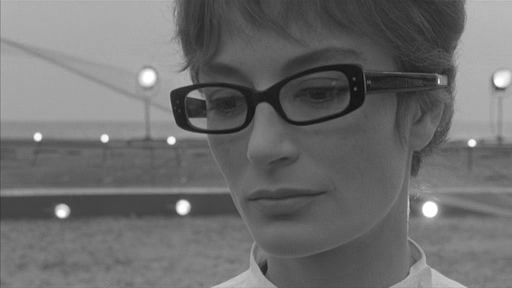
Anouk Aimée in 8½, 1963

Her abilities as an actress and the photogenic qualities of her face, its "fine lines, expression of elation and a suggestive gaze," helped her achieve success in her early films. Émile Savitry made an early portrait of her at 15, holding a kitten on the set of Carné's La Fleur de l'âge (1947). Among others of her films of this period were Pot-Bouille (1957), Les Amants de Montparnasse (Montparnasse 19) (The Lovers of Montparnasse, (1958), and La tête contre les murs (Head Against the Wall, 1958).

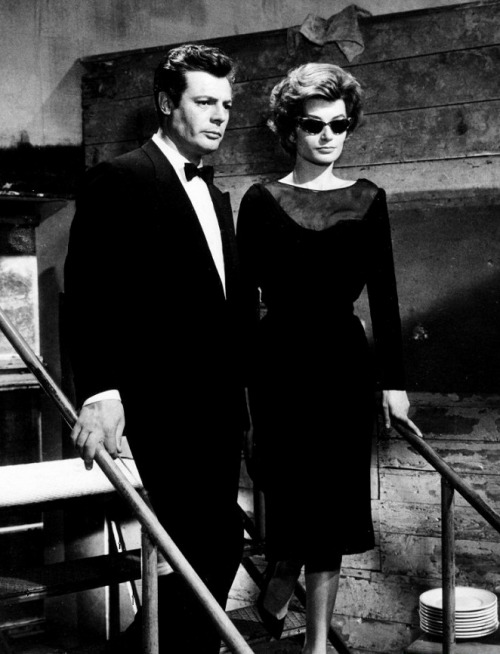
Anouk Aimée with Marcello Mastroianni

Besides the French cinema, Aimée's career included films made in Spain, Great Britain, Italy, and Germany. She achieved worldwide attention in Fellini's La Dolce Vita (1960) and Lola (1961). She appeared again in Fellini's 8½, and would remain in Italy during the first half of the 1960s, making films for a number of Italian directors. Because of her role in La Dolce Vita, biographer Dave Thompson describes Aimée as a "rising star who exploded" onto the film world. He adds that singer-songwriter Patti Smith, who in her teens saw the film, began to idolise her, and "dreamed of being an actress like Aimée."

Aimée's greatest success came with the film A Man and a Woman (Un homme et une femme, 1966) directed by Claude Lelouch. Primarily due to the excellent acting by its stars, Aimée and Jean-Louis Trintignant, and the beautiful musical score, the film became an international success, winning both the Grand Prize at the Cannes Film Festival in 1966 and two Oscars including Best Foreign Language Film. Tabery states that with her "subtle portrayal of the heroine—self-protective, then succumbing to a new love—Aimée seemed to create a new kind of femme fatale."

Film historian Jurgen Muller adds, "whether one likes the film or not, it's still hard for anyone to resist the melancholy aura of Anouk Aimée." In many of her subsequent films, she would continue to play that type of role, "a woman of sensitivity whose emotions are often kept secret."

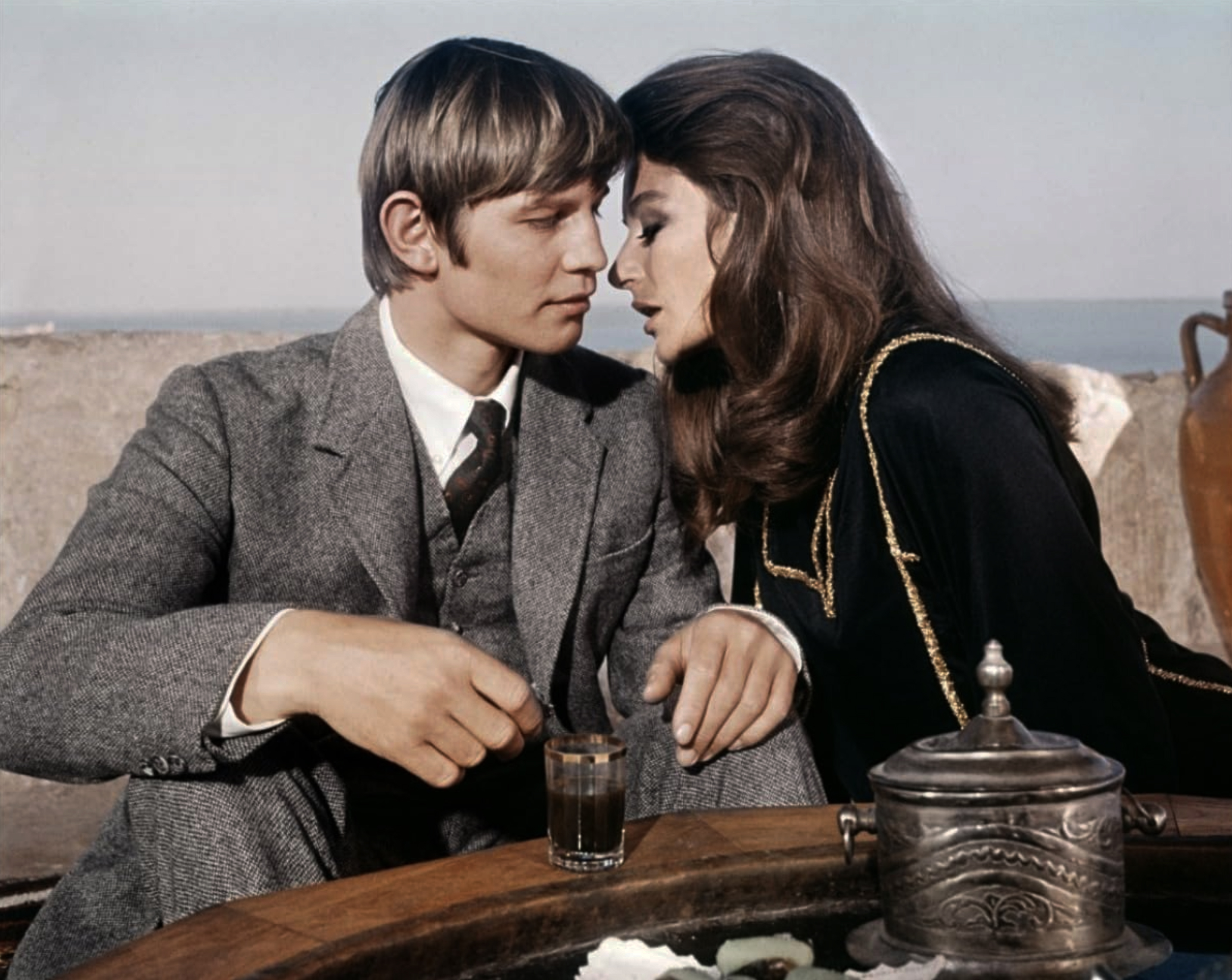
Anouk Aimée and Michael York in Justine, 1969

She starred in the American film production of Justine (1969), costarring Dirk Bogarde and directed by George Cukor and Joseph Strick. Filmed in the city of Alexandria, Egypt, the film contained some nudity, with one writer observing, "Anouk is always impeccable, oozing the sexy, detached air of the elite . . . when she drops these trappings, along with her couture clothing, Anouk's naked perfection will annihilate you."

Photojournalist Eve Arnold, assigned to photograph and write a story about Aimée and her role, spoke to Dirk Bogarde, who had known her since she was fifteen. He said that "She is never so happy as when she is miserable between love affairs," referencing her recent love affair with Omar Sharif, her co-star in The Appointment (1969). Arnold photographed Aimée, who talked about her role as the character Justine. Justine was also Jewish. Arnold recalls one of their talks:

I am still haunted by two things she quoted. They seemed to say more about her than anything else I experienced with her during the three weeks I knew her on the film:
Quote from Treblinka: 'The Jews are prone to anguish but seldom given to despair.'
And a quote by an anonymous Jewish poet to his wife when the Nazis came to get them: 'Till now we have lived with fear, now we can know hope.'

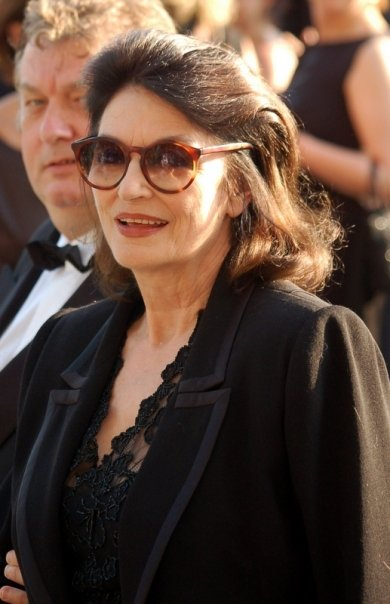
Anouk Aimée at Cannes, 2007

Another American film, La Brava, starring Dustin Hoffman, was set to be made in 1984 but was never completed. Hoffman at first decided it would play better if he were in love with a younger girl rather than the original story's older woman. "Where are you going to get a good-looking older woman?" he asked. He rejected Faye Dunaway, feeling she was "too obvious." A month later, after a chance meeting with Aimée in Paris, he changed his mind, telling his producer, "I can fall in love with the older woman. I met Anouk Aimée over the weekend. She looks great." He begged his producer to at least talk to her: "Come on, get on the phone, say hello to her. . . Just listen to her voice, it's great."

Robert Altman, at another time, wanted to use Aimée in a film to be called Lake Lugano, about a woman who was a Holocaust survivor returning long after the war. She "loved the script," according to Altman. However, she backed out after discussing the part with him more thoroughly:

I do remember he was like a bomb. He had a strong personality. He was tall, and he had a big voice. 'I want this,' and 'I want that.' I remember thinking it would be very difficult to work with him, and we didn't make the film.

In 2002, she received an honorary César Award, France's national film award, and in 2003 received an Honorary Golden Bear at the Berlin International Film Festival. In the 1960s, Life magazine called her "the Left Bank's most beautiful resident ... after each picture her enigmatic beauty lingered" in the memories of her audience.

In late 2013, the Cinemania film festival in Montréal paid tribute to Aimée's career.

Aimée reunited with director Claude Lelouch and co-star Jean-Louis Trintignant for a follow-up to Un homme et une femme and its sequel, A Man and a Woman: 20 Years Later (Un homme et une femme, 20 ans deja, 1986) which is her final film. The result, The Best Years of a Life (Les plus belles années d'une vie, 2019), was shown at Cannes out of competition.

== Personal life ==
Aimée was married and divorced four times: Édouard Zimmermann (1949–1950), director Nico Papatakis (1951–1954), actor and musical producer Pierre Barouh (1966–1969), and actor Albert Finney (1970–1978). She had one child, Manuela Papatakis (born 1951), from her second marriage. Her daughter (in marriage: Mujdei) became a painter.

She died at her home in Paris on 18 June 2024, at the age of 92. She was buried privately at the Saint-Vincent Cemetery in Paris on 25 June.

== Status and legacy ==
Aimée was nominated for the Academy Award for Best Actress for her role opposite Jean-Louis Trintignant in A Man and a Woman, becoming one of a relatively small number of actors to be nominated for a non-English language performance.

The Guardian film critic Peter Bradshaw wrote in an obituary for her that "The enigma, sensuality and vulnerability of Aimee's screen persona are all there in essence – and above all the loneliness that comes with beauty." According to Bradshaw, "She had something of the young Joan Crawford, or Marlene Dietrich, or her contemporary, the French model and actress Capucine. Aimée radiated an enigmatic sexual aura flavoured with melancholy, sophistication and worldly reserve" and "had a unique screen presence that was at once alluring and forbidding" He wrote about her role in La dolce vita that the actress's "natural hauteur made her a natural for the role and, with her airy detachment and beauty, could be said almost to have invented Italian cinema's modish ennui which Michelangelo Antonioni later developed."

French Culture Minister Rachida Dati tweeted on X: "We bid farewell to a world-famous icon, to a great actress of French cinema who took on roles for some of the biggest names, such as (Jacques) Demy, Lelouch and (Federico) Fellini."

== Selected filmography ==
Year	Title	Role	Director	Ref
1947	La Maison sous la mer	Anouk	Henri Calef	
1949	Les amants de Vérone ("The Lovers Of Verona")	Georgia Maglia (a modern Juliet)	André Cayatte	
1950	Golden Salamander	Anna	Ronald Neame	
1952	La Bergère et le ramoneur (animation film)	Voice (the female shepherd)	Paul Grimault	
1952	Le Rideau cramoisi	Albertine	Alexandre Astruc	
1952	The Man Who Watched Trains Go By ("Paris Express")	Jeanne	Harold French	
1955	Contraband Spain	Elena Vargas	Lawrence Huntington	
1955	Les Mauvaises rencontres ("Bad Liaisons")	Catherine Racan	Alexandre Astruc	
1956	Ich suche Dich ("I seek you")	Françoise Maurer	O.W. Fischer	
1956	Nina	Nina Iwanowa	Rudolf Jugert	
1957	Pot-Bouille ("Lovers of Paris")	Marie	Julien Duvivier	
1957	Anyone Can Kill Me	Isabelle	Henri Decoin	
1958	Les Amants de Montparnasse (Montparnasse 19)	Jeanne Hébuterne	Jacques Becker	
1959	The Journey	Eva	Anatole Litvak	
1959	La tête contre les murs	Stéphanie	Georges Franju	
1959	Les Dragueurs ("The Chasers")	Jeanne	Jean-Pierre Mocky	
1960	La Dolce Vita	Maddalena	Federico Fellini	
1960	The Joker	Hélène Laroche	Philippe de Broca	
1961	Il giudizio universale ("The Last Judgement")	Irene	Vittorio De Sica	
1961	Lola	Lola	Jacques Demy	
1962	Sodom and Gomorrah	Queen Bera	Robert Aldrich	
1962	Il giorno più corto ("The shortest Day")	cameo appearance	Sergio Corbucci	
1963	8½	Luisa Anselmi	Federico Fellini	
1964	Le voci bianche ("White Voices")	Lorenza	Pasquale Festa Campanile	
1965	La fuga ("The Escape")	Luisa	Paolo Spinola	
1965	The Dreamer ("Il Morbidone")	Valeria	Massimo Franciosa	
1966	Un homme et une femme ("A Man and a Woman")	Anne Gauthier	Claude Lelouch	
1968	Un soir, un train (One Night... A Train)	Anne	André Delvaux	
1969	Model Shop	Lola	Jacques Demy	
1969	The Appointment	Carla	Sidney Lumet	
1969	Justine	Justine	George Cukor	
1976	Si c'était à refaire ("Second Chance")	Sarah Gordon	Claude Lelouch	
1978	Mon premier amour	Jane Romain (the mother)	Élie Chouraqui	
1979	(Salto nel vuoto) ("A Leap in the Dark")	Marta Ponticelli	Marco Bellocchio	
1981	La Tragedia di un uomo ridicolo ("Tragedy of a Ridiculous Man")	Barbara Spaggiari	Bernardo Bertolucci	
1983	Il generale dell'armata morte ("The General of the Dead Army")	Countess Betsy Mirafiore	Luciano Tovoli	
1983	Viva la vie	Anouk	Claude Lelouch	
1984	Success Is the Best Revenge	Monique des Fontaines	Jerzy Skolimowski	
1986	Un Homme et une femme : vingt ans déjà ("A Man and a Woman: 20 Years Later")	Anne Gauthier	Claude Lelouch	
1990	Bethune: The Making of a Hero	Marie-France Coudaire	Phillip Borsos	
1994	Les Cent et une nuits de Simon Cinéma ("A Hundred and One Nights")	Anouk	Agnès Varda	
1994	Prêt-à-Porter ("Ready to wear")	Simone Lowenthal	Robert Altman	
1996	Hommes, femmes : mode d'emploi	the widow	Claude Lelouch	
1997	Solomon	Bathsheba	Roger Young	
1998	L.A. Without a Map	as herself	Mika Kaurismäki	
1999	Une pour toutes ("One 4 All")	the musician's wife	Claude Lelouch	
2002	Festival in Cannes	Millie Marquand	Henry Jaglom	
2002	Napoléon	Letizia Bonaparte	Yves Simoneau	
2003	Ils se marièrent et eurent beaucoup d'enfants ("Happily Ever After")	Vincent's mother	Yvan Attal	
2003	La Petite prairie aux bouleaux	Myriam	Marceline Loridan-Ivens	
2010	Paris Connections	Agnès	Harley Cokeliss	
2011	Tous les soleils ("Silence of love")	Agathe	Philippe Claudel	
2012	Mince alors!	mother	Charlotte de Turckheim	
2019	The Best Years of a Life	Anne Gauthier	Claude Lelouch	

== See also ==
- List of Academy Award winners and nominees from France
- List of actors with Academy Award nominations
- List of actors nominated for Academy Awards for non-English performances
- List of actors who have appeared in multiple Palme d'Or winners
