= 2016 in film =

2016 in film is an overview of events, including the highest-grossing films, award ceremonies, festivals, a list of films released, and notable deaths.

== Evaluation of the year ==
In his article highlighting the best films of 2016, Richard Brody of The New Yorker stated,

Hollywood is the world's best money-laundering machine. It takes in huge amounts of money from the sale of mass-market commodities and cleanses some of it with the production of cinematic masterworks. Earning billions of dollars from C.G.I. comedies for children, superhero movies, sci-fi apocalypses, and other popular genres, the big studios channel some of those funds into movies by Wes Anderson, Sofia Coppola, Spike Lee, Martin Scorsese, James Gray, and other worthies. Sometimes there's even an overlap between the two groups of movies, as when Ryan Coogler made Creed, or when Scorsese made the modernist horror instant-classic Shutter Island, or when Clint Eastwood makes just about anything.

== Highest-grossing films ==
The top ten films released in 2016 by worldwide gross are as follows:

Highest-grossing films of 2016
Rank	Title	Distributor	Worldwide gross
1	Captain America: Civil War	Disney	$1,153,296,293
2	Rogue One: A Star Wars Story	Disney	$1,056,057,273
3	Finding Dory	Disney	$1,029,266,989
4	Zootopia	Disney	$1,023,784,195
5	The Jungle Book	Disney	$966,550,600
6	The Secret Life of Pets	Universal	$875,457,937
7	Batman v Superman: Dawn of Justice	Warner Bros.	$874,360,194
8	Fantastic Beasts and Where to Find Them	Warner Bros.	$814,037,575
9	Deadpool	20th Century Fox	$782,612,155
10	Suicide Squad	Warner Bros.	$746,846,894

Captain America: Civil War, Rogue One: A Star Wars Story, Finding Dory, and Zootopia grossed more than $1 billion each, making them among the highest-grossing films of all time. This is the first year that two animated films (Finding Dory and Zootopia) grossed over $1 billion in a single year, and are among the highest-grossing animated films.

Captain America: Civil War, Zootopia, Kung Fu Panda 3, Warcraft, and The Great Wall have all grossed more than ¥1 billion at the Chinese box office, making them among the highest-grossing films in China.

=== 2016 box office records ===
==== Studio records ====
- Walt Disney Studios reached $1 billion at the domestic box office faster than any other studio; it reached this goal on the 128th day of 2016, beating Universal Studios' record of reaching the goal on the 165th day of 2015. Disney's previous record for reaching $1 billion was on the 174th day of 2015. The studio became the first to have five of its releases (Rogue One, Finding Dory, Captain America: Civil War, The Jungle Book, and Zootopia) from a single year reach $300 million domestically. Disney also eclipsed Universal's 2015 record for most films from a single year crossing $1 billion worldwide with four (Captain America: Civil War, Rogue One, Finding Dory, and Zootopia), setting a new record for most billion-dollar-grossing films over two years with six (including Avengers: Age of Ultron and Star Wars: The Force Awakens). Walt Disney Studios has also become the first studio to have the five highest-grossing films worldwide, and the first since at least 1913 to have the three highest-grossing films in the U.S., both in a single year. Disney became the first studio to gross more than $3 billion at the domestic box office and, with the release of Rogue One, became the first to gross more than $7 billion at the global box office, surpassing Universal's previous record of $6.9 billion in 2015. Disney later passes $7 billion at the global box office again in 2018. Disney is also the first studio to have three films gross over $400 million domestically in a single year (Rogue One, Finding Dory, and Captain America: Civil War), and the first to fill in all slots of the top five films of any particular year.
- Disney's Marvel Cinematic Universe became the first film franchise to have four of its films gross over $1 billion with Captain America: Civil War joining 2012's The Avengers, 2013's Iron Man 3 and 2015's Avengers: Age of Ultron, and the first to gross more than $10 billion with the release of Civil War.

==== Film records ====
- Deadpool became the second-highest-grossing R-rated domestic film of all time with $363.1 million, after The Passion of the Christ ($370.8 million in 2004). It later became the highest-grossing R-rated film of all time worldwide, surpassing The Matrix Reloaded, with $783.1 million. It also became the highest-grossing superhero film not to feature Batman, Spider-Man, or Iron Man in any capacity.
- Zootopia became the highest-grossing original animated film of all time, surpassing Finding Nemo ($940.3 million in 2003). Along with Finding Dory, it became one of two animated films to earn over $1 billion in the same year, a first.
- Batman v Superman: Dawn of Justice had the biggest worldwide opening weekend ever for a superhero film with $422.5 million, surpassing The Avengers ($392.5 million in 2012). The film, along with Captain America: Civil War, were the most expensive films of the year ($250 million).
- Dangal became the highest-grossing Indian film of all-time, partly due to successful ticket-sales in China.
- The Mermaid became the highest-grossing film ever in China and the first film ever to earn over $500 million without a wide North American release.
- Shin Godzilla, the 31st Godzilla film, grossed about ¥82.5 billion ($77.9 million), making it the highest-grossing Japanese-made film in the franchise, the most successful live-action Japanese film in 2016, and the second-most successful film of the year in Japan.
- The anime film Your Name grossed US$354 million, becoming the highest-grossing anime film, the fourth-highest-grossing film in Japan, and the seventh-highest-grossing traditionally animated film. In China, it grossed US$81.3 million, becoming the highest-grossing 2D animated film and the highest-grossing Japanese film in the world's second-largest movie market, as well as the highest-grossing non-Hollywood foreign film in China until it was surpassed by Indian film Dangal.
- Warcraft became the highest-grossing video game adaptation worldwide, with $433.5 million, surpassing Prince of Persia: The Sands of Time ($336.4 million in 2010).
- Finding Dory grossed $135.1 million domestically and $185.7 million worldwide in its opening weekend, setting records for the biggest domestic opening weekend for both Pixar (surpassing Toy Story 3, with $110.3 million in 2010) and any animated film (surpassing Shrek the Third, with $121.6 million in 2007), the biggest worldwide opening weekend for Pixar (surpassing Inside Out, with $180.1 million in 2015), and the second-biggest opening weekend worldwide for an animated film after Ice Age: Dawn of the Dinosaurs ($218.4 million in 2009). It later became the highest-grossing animated film at the domestic box office, surpassing Shrek 2 ($441.2 million in 2004). It became the first animated film to cross $450, $460, $470, and $480 million at the domestic box office. Along with Zootopia, it became one of two animated films to earn over $1 billion in the same year, a first. It also became the eighth film to do so during the two-year period of 2015–16, surpassing the previous record of seven billion-dollar films during the two-year period of 2011–12.
- The Secret Life of Pets grossed $104.4 million domestically in its opening weekend, breaking Inside Out's record ($90.4 million) for the highest domestic opening weekend for an original film of any kind, and became the first original film to open above $100 million domestically. It also became the highest-grossing original non-Disney animated film ever, both domestically (surpassing Despicable Me, with $251.5 million in 2010) and worldwide (beating Kung Fu Panda, with $631.7 million in 2008).
- Sausage Party became the highest-grossing R-rated animated film of all time ($140.7 million), surpassing South Park: Bigger, Longer & Uncut ($83.1 million in 1999).
- Doctor Strange became the highest-grossing single-character debut of any Marvel Cinematic Universe film worldwide with $677.7 million, beating Iron Man ($585.2 million in 2008).
- 2016 became the first year to have ten films to cross $700 million worldwide, beating 2014's record of nine films. It also surpassed the latter year in terms of most films earning more than $500 million with sixteen (Doctor Strange, Moana, Sing, The Mermaid, X-Men: Apocalypse, and Kung Fu Panda 3 have all grossed over $500 million) and $600 million with thirteen (Doctor Strange, Moana, and Sing have all grossed over $600 million).
- 2016 was the first year since 2000 to not have films that were among the 10 highest-grossing films of all time at the time of their releases.
- Sing broke the record of a film that never reached #1 in the US with $270.3 million, passing My Big Fat Greek Wedding ($241.4 million in 2002–2003).

== Events ==
- August 22, 2016 - Comcast and NBCUniversal complete their $3.8 billion acquisition of DreamWorks Animation.

=== Award ceremonies ===
Date	Event	Host	Location	Source
January 10	73rd Golden Globe Awards	Hollywood Foreign Press Association	Beverly Hills, California, U.S.	
January 15	61st Filmfare Awards	Filmfare	NSCI Dome, Mumbai, India	
January 17	21st Critics' Choice Awards	Broadcast Film Critics Association	Santa Monica, California, U.S.	
January 18	51st Guldbagge Awards	Swedish Film Institute	Djurgården, Sweden	
January 23	Producers Guild of America Awards 2015	Producers Guild of America	Beverly Hills, California, U.S.	
January 30	22nd Screen Actors Guild Awards	Screen Actors Guild-American Federation of Television and Radio Artists	Los Angeles, California, U.S.	
January 31	8th Gaudí Awards	Catalan Film Academy	Barcelona, Catalonia, Spain	
February 6	43rd Annie Awards	ASIFA-Hollywood	Los Angeles, California, U.S.	
February 6	30th Goya Awards	Academy of Cinematographic Arts and Sciences of Spain	Madrid, Spain	
February 6	6th Magritte Awards	Académie André Delvaux	Brussels, Belgium	
February 6	68th Directors Guild of America Awards	Directors Guild of America	Los Angeles, California, U.S.	
February 8	21st Lumière Awards	Académie des Lumières	Paris, France	
February 10	African-American Film Critics Association Awards 2015	African-American Film Critics Association	Hollywood, California, U.S.	
February 13	Writers Guild of America Awards 2015	Writers Guild of America	Manhattan, New York, U.S. & Los Angeles, California, U.S.	
February 14	69th British Academy Film Awards	British Academy of Film and Television Arts	London, England, UK	
February 21	20th Satellite Awards	International Press Academy	Los Angeles, California, U.S.	
February 26	41st César Awards	Academy of Cinema Arts and Techniques	Paris, France	
February 27	31st Independent Spirit Awards	Independent Spirit Awards	Santa Monica, California, U.S.	
February 27	36th Golden Raspberry Awards	Golden Raspberry Awards	Hollywood, California, U.S.	
February 28	88th Academy Awards	Academy of Motion Picture Arts and Sciences	Hollywood, California, U.S.	
March 9	2015 Dorian Awards Winners Toast	Gay and Lesbian Entertainment Critics Association	Los Angeles, California, U.S.	
April 10	2016 MTV Movie Awards	MTV	Burbank, California, U.S.	
May 28	58th Ariel Awards	Mexican Academy of Film Arts and Sciences	Mexico City, Mexico	
June 11	12th Africa Movie Academy Awards	Africa Film Academy	Port Harcourt, Rivers State, Nigeria	
June 22	42nd Saturn Awards	Academy of Science Fiction, Fantasy and Horror Films	Burbank, California, U.S.	
December 11	22nd Critics' Choice Awards	Broadcast Film Critics Association	Santa Monica, California, U.S.	

=== Festivals ===
List of some of the film festivals for 2016 that have been accredited by the International Federation of Film Producers Associations (FIAPF).

Date	Event	Host	Location	Source
January 21–31	38th Sundance Film Festival	Sundance Institute	Park City, Utah, U.S.	
February 11–21	66th Berlin International Film Festival	Berlin International Film Festival	Berlin, Germany	
May 11–22	69th Cannes Film Festival	Festival de Cannes	Cannes, France	
July 1–9	51st Karlovy Vary International Film Festival	Karlovy Vary International Film Festival	Karlovy Vary, Czech Republic	
August 12–20	22nd Sarajevo Film Festival	Sarajevo Film Festival	Sarajevo, Bosnia and Herzegovina	
August 31 – September 10	73rd Venice International Film Festival	Venice Film Festival	Venice, Italy	
September 8–18	41st Toronto International Film Festival	Toronto International Film Festival	Toronto, Ontario, Canada	
November 11–27	20th Tallinn Black Nights Film Festival	Tallinn Black Nights Film Festival	Tallinn, Estonia	

== Awards ==
Category/Organization	22nd Critics' Choice Awards December 11, 2016	74th Golden Globe Awards January 8, 2017		Producers, Directors, Screen Actors, and Writers Guild Awards	70th BAFTA Awards February 12, 2017	89th Academy Awards February 26, 2017
Category/Organization	22nd Critics' Choice Awards December 11, 2016	Drama	Musical or Comedy	Producers, Directors, Screen Actors, and Writers Guild Awards	70th BAFTA Awards February 12, 2017	89th Academy Awards February 26, 2017
Best Film	La La Land	Moonlight	La La Land			Moonlight
Best Director	Damien Chazelle; La La Land					
Best Actor	Casey Affleck; Manchester by the Sea		Ryan Gosling; La La Land	Denzel Washington; Fences	Casey Affleck; Manchester by the Sea	
Best Actress	Natalie Portman; Jackie	Isabelle Huppert; Elle	Emma Stone; La La Land			
Best Supporting Actor	Mahershala Ali; Moonlight	Aaron Taylor-Johnson; Nocturnal Animals		Mahershala Ali; Moonlight	Dev Patel; Lion	Mahershala Ali; Moonlight
Best Supporting Actress	Viola Davis; Fences					
Best Screenplay, Adapted	Eric Heisserer; Arrival	Damien Chazelle; La La Land		Eric Heisserer; Arrival	Luke Davies; Lion	Barry Jenkins and Tarell Alvin McCraney; Moonlight
Best Screenplay, Original	Damien Chazelle; La La Land (tie); Kenneth Lonergan; Manchester by the Sea (tie)	Damien Chazelle; La La Land		Barry Jenkins and Tarell Alvin McCraney; Moonlight	Kenneth Lonergan; Manchester by the Sea	
Best Animated Film	Zootopia				Kubo and the Two Strings	Zootopia
Best Original Score	La La Land; Justin Hurwitz			—N/a	La La Land; Justin Hurwitz	
Best Original Song	"City of Stars"; La La Land			—N/a	—N/a	"City of Stars"; La La Land
Best Foreign Language Film	Elle			—N/a	Son of Saul	The Salesman
Best Documentary (Note: From 2016 onward, the category was shifted from the Critics' Choice Awards to the ancillary Critics' Choice Documentary Awards.)	O.J.: Made in America	—N/a	—N/a	O.J.: Made in America	13th	O.J.: Made in America

Palme d'Or (69th Cannes Film Festival):

I, Daniel Blake, directed by Ken Loach, United Kingdom

Golden Lion (73rd Venice International Film Festival):

The Woman Who Left (Ang Babaeng Humayo), directed by Lav Diaz, Philippines

Golden Bear (66th Berlin International Film Festival):

Fire at Sea (Fuocoammare), directed by Gianfranco Rosi, Italy

== 2016 films ==
=== By country/region ===
- List of American films of 2016
- List of Argentine films of 2016
- List of Australian films of 2016
- List of Bangladeshi films of 2016
- List of British films of 2016
- List of Canadian films of 2016
- List of Chinese films of 2016
- List of French films of 2016
- List of Hong Kong films of 2016
- List of Indian films of 2016
  - List of Bollywood films of 2016
  - List of Punjabi films of 2016
  - List of Bengali films of 2016
  - List of Gujarati films of 2016
  - List of Kannada films of 2016
  - List of Malayalam films of 2016
  - List of Marathi films of 2016
  - List of Tamil films of 2016
  - List of Telugu films of 2016
  - List of Tulu films of 2016
- List of Italian films of 2016
- List of Japanese films of 2016
- List of Mexican films of 2016
- List of Nepali films of 2016
- List of Pakistani films of 2016
- List of Russian films of 2016
- List of South Korean films of 2016
- List of Spanish films of 2016
- List of Turkish films of 2016

=== By genre/medium ===
- List of action films of 2016
- List of animated feature films of 2016
- List of avant-garde films of 2016
- List of comedy films of 2016
- List of drama films of 2016
- List of horror films of 2016
- List of science fiction films of 2016
- List of thriller films of 2016
- List of western films of 2016

== Deaths ==
Month	Date	Name	Age	Country	Profession	Notable films
January	1	Vilmos Zsigmond	85	Hungary	Cinematographer	Close Encounters of the Third Kind; The Deer Hunter
January	4	Robert Balser	88	UK	Animator	Yellow Submarine; Heavy Metal
January	4	Michel Galabru	93	France	Actor	La Cage aux Folles; Subway
January	4	Robert Stigwood	81	Australia	Producer	Saturday Night Fever; Grease
January	6	Silvana Pampanini	90	Italy	Actress	The Cheerful Squadron; The Road a Year Long
January	6	Pat Harrington, Jr.	86	US	Actor	The Wheeler Dealers; The President's Analyst
January	7	Richard Libertini	82	US	Actor	Awakenings; Popeye
January	9	Umberto Raho	93	Italy	Actor	The Last Man on Earth; The Last Chance
January	9	Angus Scrimm	89	US	Actor	Phantasm; John Dies at the End
January	9	Beau St. Clair	63-64	US	Producer	The Thomas Crown Affair; The November Man
January	10	David Bowie	69	UK	Actor, Singer	Labyrinth; The Man Who Fell to Earth
January	11	Stanley Mann	87	Canada	Screenwriter	The Collector; Conan the Destroyer
January	11	John B. Mansbridge	98	US	Art Director, Production Designer	Tron; Pete's Dragon
January	11	David Margulies	78	US	Actor	Ghostbusters; Ace Ventura: Pet Detective
January	12	Meg Mundy	101	US	Actress	Fatal Attraction; Ordinary People
January	13	Brian Bedford	80	UK	Actor	Robin Hood; Nixon
January	13	Conrad Phillips	90	UK	Actor	Murder, She Said; Sons and Lovers
January	14	Franco Citti	80	Italy	Actor	The Godfather; Mamma Roma
January	14	Alan Rickman	69	UK	Actor, Director	Harry Potter; Die Hard
January	15	Dan Haggerty	74	US	Actor	The Life and Times of Grizzly Adams; Easy Rider
January	17	Ward Preston	83	US	Art Director, Production Designer	The Towering Inferno; Airplane!
January	19	Micole Mercurio	77	US	Actress	While You Were Sleeping; What Lies Beneath
January	19	Ettore Scola	84	Italy	Director, Screenwriter	A Special Day; The Family
January	19	Sheila Sim	93	UK	Actress	Pandora and the Flying Dutchman; A Canterbury Tale
January	22	Anthony Simmons	93	UK	Director, Producer, Screenwriter	The Optimists of Nine Elms; Black Joy
January	26	Abe Vigoda	94	US	Actor	The Godfather; Good Burger
January	29	Jacques Rivette	87	France	Director, Screenwriter	Paris Belongs to Us; Céline and Julie Go Boating
January	30	Frank Finlay	89	UK	Actor	Othello; The Pianist
February	2	Bob Elliott	92	US	Actor	Quick Change; Author! Author!
February	3	Joe Alaskey	63	US	Voice Actor	Who Framed Roger Rabbit; Looney Tunes: Back in Action
February	4	Jimmie Haskell	79	US	Composer	Surf Party; Johnny Reno
February	6	Dan Gerson	49	US	Screenwriter	Monsters, Inc.; Big Hero 6
February	8	Amelia Bence	101	Argentina	Actress	Alfonsina; 24 Hours in the Life of a Woman
February	8	Norman Hudis	93	UK	Screenwriter	Carry On; The Karate Killers
February	9	Alethea McGrath	96	Australia	Actress	Star Wars: Episode II – Attack of the Clones; Knowing
February	9	Donald E. Thorin	81	US	Cinematographer	Thief; Midnight Run
February	15	George Gaynes	98	US	Actor	Police Academy; Tootsie
February	15	Denise "Vanity" Matthews	57	Canada	Actress, Singer	The Last Dragon; Action Jackson
February	15	Jean Rabier	88	France	Cinematographer	Cold Sweat; Ten Days' Wonder
February	17	Ray West	91	US	Sound Engineer	Star Wars; Star Trek II: The Wrath of Khan
February	17	Andrzej Żuławski	75	Poland	Director, Screenwriter	Possession; The Devil
February	22	Douglas Slocombe	103	UK	Cinematographer	Indiana Jones; The Great Gatsby
February	25	Tony Burton	78	US	Actor	Rocky; The Shining
February	25	Jim Clark	84	UK	Film Editor, Director	The Mission; The Killing Fields
February	25	François Dupeyron	65	France	Director, Screenwriter	Monsieur Ibrahim; The Officers' Ward
February	25	Colin Low	89	Canada	Documentarian	Universe; Corral
February	26	Antony Gibbs	90	UK	Film Editor	Fiddler on the Roof; Tom Jones
February	28	Honey Chhaya	85	India	Actor	The Best Exotic Marigold Hotel; Being Cyrus
February	28	Frank Kelly	77	Ireland	Actor	Rock-a-Doodle; Evelyn
February	28	George Kennedy	91	US	Actor	Cool Hand Luke; Airport
February	29	Alice Arlen	75	US	Screenwriter	Silkwood; The Weight of Water
March	1	Carole Achache	63	France	Actress, Still Photographer	Special Section; Monsieur Klein
March	6	Nancy Reagan	94	US	Actress	Hellcats of the Navy; The Next Voice You Hear...
March	7	Michael White	80	UK	Producer	The Rocky Horror Picture Show; Monty Python and the Holy Grail
March	8	Richard Davalos	85	US	Actor	East of Eden; Cool Hand Luke
March	8	George Martin	90	UK	Composer	A Hard Day's Night; Yellow Submarine
March	9	Robert Horton	91	US	Actor	Prisoner of War; Men of the Fighting Lady
March	10	Ken Adam	95	Germany	Production Designer	James Bond; Barry Lyndon
March	11	François-Eudes Chanfrault	41	France	Composer	High Tension; Donkey Punch
March	11	Shawn Elliott	79	US	Actor, Singer	Broken City; Do the Right Thing
March	11	Keith Emerson	71	UK	Composer	Godzilla: Final Wars; Nighthawks
March	11	Nicole Maurey	90	France	Actress	The Scapegoat; High Time
March	11	Ruth Terry	95	US	Singer, Actress	Call of the Canyon; Pistol Packin' Mama
March	13	Adrienne Corri	85	UK	Actress	A Clockwork Orange; Doctor Zhivago
March	14	Peter Maxwell Davies	81	UK	Composer	The Boy Friend; The Devils
March	17	Larry Drake	66	US	Actor	Darkman; Dr. Giggles
March	17	Angela Stevens	90	US	Actress	Creature with the Atom Brain; Utah Blaine
March	18	Jan Němec	79	Czech Republic	Director	A Report on the Party and the Guests; Diamonds of the Night
March	18	Joe Santos	84	US	Actor	The Last Boy Scout; Blue Thunder
March	21	Peter Brown	80	US	Actor	Foxy Brown; Kitten with a Whip
March	22	Richard Bradford	81	US	Actor	The Untouchables; More American Graffiti
March	22	Rita Gam	88	US	Actress	King of Kings; Klute
March	23	Ken Howard	71	US	Actor	1776; J. Edgar
March	24	Maggie Blye	73	US	Actress	The Italian Job; Hard Times
March	24	Earl Hamner, Jr.	92	US	Screenwriter	Where the Lilies Bloom; Palm Springs Weekend
March	24	Garry Shandling	66	US	Actor, Screenwriter	What Planet Are You From?; Iron Man 2
March	25	Shannon Bolin	99	US	Actress, Singer	Damn Yankees; If Ever I See You Again
March	26	Jim Harrison	78	US	Screenwriter	Wolf; Revenge
March	28	Igor Khait	52	US	Producer	Sing; Brother Bear
March	28	James Noble	94	US	Actor	10; Being There
March	29	Frank De Felitta	94	US	Screenwriter	Audrey Rose; The Entity
March	29	Patty Duke	69	US	Actress	The Miracle Worker; Me, Natalie
March	31	Douglas Wilmer	96	UK	Actor	Cleopatra; Octopussy
April	2	Gato Barbieri	83	Argentina	Composer	Last Tango in Paris; Firepower
April	3	Don Francks	84	Canada	Actor, Singer	Finian's Rainbow; My Bloody Valentine
April	3	Bill Henderson	90	US	Actor, Singer	Clue; City Slickers
April	4	Doug Kraner	65	US	Production Designer	Uncle Buck; Sleeping with the Enemy
April	4	Chus Lampreave	85	Spain	Actress	Talk to Her; Volver
April	5	Barbara Turner	79	US	Screenwriter, Actress	Pollock; Georgia
April	8	David Swift	85	UK	Actor	The Day of the Jackal; No Sex Please, We're British
April	9	Arthur Anderson	93	US	Actor	Midnight Cowboy; Green Card
April	12	Anne Jackson	90	US	Actress	The Shining; The Secret Life of an American Wife
April	14	Dan Ireland	57	US	Director, Producer	The Whole Wide World; Jolene
April	16	Rod Daniel	73	US	Director	Teen Wolf; Beethoven's 2nd
April	17	Doris Roberts	90	US	Actress	The Rose; The Heartbreak Kid
April	17	Kit West	80	UK	Special Effects Artist	Raiders of the Lost Ark; Dragonheart
April	18	Eva Henning	95	Sweden	Actress	Thirst; Prison
April	19	Ronit Elkabetz	51	Israel	Actress, Director	Sh'Chur; Late Marriage
April	20	Guy Hamilton	93	UK	Director	James Bond; Force 10 from Navarone
April	21	Prince	57	US	Singer, Songwriter, Actor, Director	Purple Rain; Graffiti Bridge
April	23	Madeleine Sherwood	93	Canada	Actress	Cat on a Hot Tin Roof; Sweet Bird of Youth
April	30	Franco Di Giacomo	83	Italy	Cinematographer	Il Postino; Amityville II: The Possession
May	1	Madeleine Lebeau	92	France	Actress	Casablanca; 8½
May	8	Elisa Mainardi	85	Italy	Actress	Fellini Satyricon; And the Ship Sails On
May	8	William Schallert	93	US	Actor	The Man from Planet X; Innerspace
May	10	Gene Gutowski	91	Poland	Producer	The Fearless Vampire Killers; Cul-de-sac
May	16	Moidele Bickel	79	Germany	Costume Designer	La Reine Margot; The White Ribbon
May	16	Julia Meade	90	US	Actress	Pillow Talk; Tammy Tell Me True
May	18	Lino Toffolo	81	Italy	Actor	Brancaleone at the Crusades; Sturmtruppen
May	19	Alexandre Astruc	92	France	Director	Les mauvaises rencontres; La Proie pour l'ombre
May	19	Alan Young	96	UK	Actor	The Time Machine; Beverly Hills Cop III
May	24	Burt Kwouk	85	UK	Actor	The Pink Panther; Goldfinger
May	26	Angela Paton	86	US	Actress	Blue Sky; Groundhog Day
May	28	Giorgio Albertazzi	92	Italy	Actor	Last Year at Marienbad; Eva
June	6	Theresa Saldana	61	US	Actress	Raging Bull; I Wanna Hold Your Hand
June	6	Peter Shaffer	90	UK	Screenwriter	Amadeus; Equus
June	8	Marina Malfatti	83	Italy	Actress	All the Colors of the Dark; A Black Ribbon for Deborah
June	12	Janet Waldo	97	US	Actress	Zaza; Waterloo Bridge
June	13	Michu Meszaros	76	Hungary	Actor	Big Top Pee-wee; Waxwork
June	14	Ronnie Claire Edwards	83	US	Actress	The Dead Pool; 8 Seconds
June	14	Ann Morgan Guilbert	87	US	Actress	Grumpier Old Men; Viva Max!
June	17	Ron Lester	45	US	Actor	Varsity Blues; Not Another Teen Movie
June	18	Paul Cox	76	Australia	Director	Cactus; Man of Flowers
June	19	Götz George	77	Germany	Actor	Schtonk!; Deathmaker
June	19	Anton Yelchin	27	US	Actor	Star Trek; Alpha Dog
June	22	Harry Rabinowitz	100	UK	Conductor	Chariots of Fire; The English Patient
June	25	Nicole Courcel	84	France	Actress	Sundays and Cybele; Rendezvous in July
June	25	Giuseppe Ferrara	83	Italy	Director, Screenwriter	The Moro Affair; State Secret
June	27	Bud Spencer	86	Italy	Actor	They Call Me Trinity; Four Flies on Grey Velvet
July	1	Robin Hardy	86	UK	Director	The Wicker Man; The Wicker Tree
July	2	Michael Cimino	77	US	Director, Screenwriter	The Deer Hunter; Heaven's Gate
July	2	Euan Lloyd	92	UK	Producer	Paper Tiger; The Wild Geese
July	4	Abbas Kiarostami	76	Iran	Director, Screenwriter	Taste of Cherry; Certified Copy
July	6	John McMartin	86	US	Actor	All the President's Men; Blow Out
July	11	Emma Cohen	69	Spain	Actress	The Glass Ceiling; The Legend of Frenchie King
July	13	Héctor Babenco	70	Argentina	Director	Kiss of the Spider Woman; Ironweed
July	14	Eric Bergren	62	US	Screenwriter	The Elephant Man; Frances
July	14	Lisa Gaye	81	US	Actress	Drums Across the River; Rock Around the Clock
July	19	Garry Marshall	81	US	Director, Actor	Pretty Woman; The Princess Diaries
July	24	Marni Nixon	86	US	Singer, Actress	The King and I; West Side Story
July	27	Michael J. Leeson	69	US	Screenwriter	The War of the Roses; I.Q.
July	29	Vivean Gray	92	UK	Actress	Picnic at Hanging Rock; The Last Wave
July	30	Gloria DeHaven	91	US	Actress, Singer	Summer Stock; Three Little Words
August	1	Jonathan D. Krane	65	US	Producer	Look Who's Talking; Swordfish
August	2	David Huddleston	85	US	Actor	The Big Lebowski; Blazing Saddles
August	13	Kenny Baker	81	UK	Actor	Star Wars; The Elephant Man
August	14	Fyvush Finkel	93	US	Actor	Nixon; A Serious Man
August	17	Arthur Hiller	92	Canada	Director	Love Story; Silver Streak
August	19	Jack Riley	80	US	Actor	To Be or Not to Be; High Anxiety
August	21	Norma Moriceau	72	Australia	Costume Designer	Mad Max 2; Crocodile Dundee
August	23	André Melançon	74	Canada	Director, Actor, Screenwriter	The Dog Who Stopped the War; Bach and Broccoli
August	23	Steven Hill	94	US	Actor	Yentl; The Firm
August	25	Marvin Kaplan	89	US	Actor	Wild at Heart; It's a Mad, Mad, Mad, Mad World
August	29	Gene Wilder	83	US	Actor, Director, Screenwriter	Young Frankenstein; The Producers
September	1	Jon Polito	65	US	Actor	Miller's Crossing; The Man Who Wasn't There
September	2	John Hostetter	69	US	Actor	Heartbreak Ridge; The People Under the Stairs
September	3	Leslie H. Martinson	101	US	Director	Batman; The Atomic Kid
September	5	Hugh O'Brian	91	US	Actor	The Shootist; Ten Little Indians
September	10	Giuliano Carnimeo	84	Italy	Director, Screenwriter	The Case of the Bloody Iris; Find a Place to Die
September	11	Alexis Arquette	47	US	Actress	Pulp Fiction; The Wedding Singer
September	14	Kim McGuire	60	US	Actress	Cry-Baby; Disturbed
September	14	Dennis Shryack	80	US	Screenwriter	Pale Rider; The Gauntlet
September	15	James Stacy	79	US	Actor	Flareup; Posse
September	16	Tarık Akan	66	Turkey	Actor	Yol; The Chaos Class
September	19	Bobby Breen	88	Canada	Actor	Rainbow on the River; Hawaii Calls
September	20	Curtis Hanson	71	US	Director, Screenwriter	L.A. Confidential; 8 Mile
September	23	Fern Buchner	87	US	Makeup Artist	The Addams Family; Zelig
September	24	Bill Nunn	62	US	Actor	Do the Right Thing; Spider-Man
September	25	Rod Temperton	66	UK	Songwriter, Composer	The Color Purple; Running Scared
September	26	Herschell Gordon Lewis	87	US	Director, Screenwriter	The Wizard of Gore; The Gore Gore Girls
October	1	Ian Liston	68	UK	Actor	A Bridge Too Far; The Empire Strikes Back
October	7	Wolfgang Suschitzky	104	Austria	Cinematographer	Get Carter; Ulysses
October	8	Gary Dubin	57	US	Actor	The Aristocats; Jaws 2
October	9	Andrzej Wajda	90	Poland	Director, Screenwriter	Ashes and Diamonds; A Generation
October	11	Patricia Barry	93	US	Actress	Cry Wolf; Twilight Zone: The Movie
October	12	Thomas Mikal Ford	52	US	Actor	Harlem Nights; Class Act
October	13	Tonino Valerii	82	Italy	Director, Screenwriter	My Name is Nobody; Day of Anger
October	14	Pierre Étaix	87	France	Actor, Director, Screenwriter	Yo Yo; The Great Love
October	20	Michael Massee	61	US	Actor	The Crow; Lost Highway
October	21	Janet Patterson	60	Australia	Costume Designer, Production Designer	The Piano; Bright Star
October	23	Jane Alderman	77	US	Casting Director	Candyman; The Straight Story
October	30	Tammy Grimes	82	US	Actress, Singer	Play It as It Lays; Slaves of New York
October	30	Don Marshall	80	US	Actor	Sergeant Ryker; Terminal Island
November	3	Marc Michel	83	Switzerland	Actor	Lola; The Umbrellas of Cherbourg
November	5	John Carson	89	UK	Actor	Captain Kronos – Vampire Hunter; Doomsday
November	7	Julie Gregg	79	US	Actress	The Godfather; Man of La Mancha
November	8	Raoul Coutard	92	France	Cinematographer	Breathless; Jules and Jim
November	11	Robert Vaughn	83	US	Actor	The Magnificent Seven; The Young Philadelphians
November	12	Lupita Tovar	106	Mexico	Actress	Dracula; Green Hell
November	14	Janet Wright	71	Canada	Actress	McCabe & Mrs. Miller; The Perfect Storm
November	19	Aiace Parolin	96	Italy	Cinematographer	Seduced and Abandoned; Alfredo, Alfredo
November	19	Paul Sylbert	88	US	Production Designer	Heaven Can Wait; Baby Doll
November	21	Gunnar Eyjólfsson	90	Iceland	Actor	101 Reykjavík; Beowulf & Grendel
November	23	Jerry Tucker	91	US	Actor	Captain January; Prosperity
November	25	Ron Glass	71	US	Actor	Serenity; Death at a Funeral
November	25	David Hamilton	83	UK	Director	Tender Cousins; A Summer in St. Tropez
November	26	Fritz Weaver	90	US	Actor	Marathon Man; Creepshow
November	30	Alice Drummond	88	US	Actress	Ghostbusters; Doubt
December	1	Don Calfa	76	US	Actor	The Return of the Living Dead; Weekend at Bernie's
December	3	Billy Chapin	72	US	Actor	The Night of the Hunter; Violent Saturday
December	3	Susan Cummings	86	Germany	Actress	Utah Blaine; Swamp Women
December	4	Margaret Whitton	67	US	Actress	Major League; 9½ Weeks
December	6	Peter Vaughan	93	UK	Actor	Brazil; Straw Dogs
December	8	Joseph Mascolo	87	US	Actor	Yes, Giorgio; Jaws 2
December	13	Alan Thicke	69	Canada	Actor	Carolina; Alpha Dog
December	14	Bernard Fox	89	UK	Actor	Titanic; The Mummy
December	15	Fran Jeffries	79	US	Actress, Singer	The Pink Panther; Harum Scarum
December	18	Zsa Zsa Gabor	99	Hungary	Actress	Moulin Rouge; Touch of Evil
December	19	Dick Latessa	87	US	Actor	Alfie; Stigmata
December	20	Michèle Morgan	96	France	Actress	The Fallen Idol; Port of Shadows
December	22	Philip Saville	86	UK	Director	Oedipus the King; Metroland
December	24	Gil Parrondo	95	Spain	Production Designer	Patton; Nicholas and Alexandra
December	26	Ricky Harris	54	US	Actor	Heat; Dope
December	26	George S. Irving	94	US	Actor	Up the Sandbox; Deadly Hero
December	26	Liz Smith	95	UK	Actress	Little Dorrit; A Private Function
December	26	Barbara Tarbuck	74	US	Actress	Big Trouble; Walking Tall
December	27	Carrie Fisher	60	US	Actress	Star Wars; When Harry Met Sally...
December	28	Debbie Reynolds	84	US	Actress	Singin' in the Rain; The Unsinkable Molly Brown
December	30	George Kosana	81	US	Actor	Night of the Living Dead; There's Always Vanilla

== Film debuts ==
- Awkwafina – Neighbors 2: Sorority Rising
- Michael C. Burgess – South of 8
- Sofia Carson – Tini: The Movie
- Lana Condor – X-Men: Apocalypse
- Auli'i Cravalho – Moana
- Matilda De Angelis – Italian Race
- Claudia Doumit – Losing in Love
- Corentin Fila – Being 17
- Beth Gallagher – Slap Worthy
- Gala Gordon – Kids in Love
- Tallulah Haddon – Spaceship
- Olivia Hamilton – La La Land
- Aleksandar Kerošević – Verrückt nach Fixi
- Sasha Lane – American Honey
- Sophia Lillis – 37
- Sanya Malhotra – Dangal
- María de Nati – May God Save Us
- Jennifer Paredes – A Life Lived
- Rinku Rajguru – Sairat
- Anthony Ramos – White Girl
- Noah Robbins – Indignation
- Ethan Slater – Evol
- Nadia Tereszkiewicz – The Dancer
- Akash Thosar – Sairat
- Geraldine Viswanathan – Emo the Musical
