= Une vie =

Une vie, or Une Vie, (French: A Life, One Life) may refer to:

== Books ==
- Une vie, 1883 novel by Guy de Maupassant
- Une vie, autobiography of Simone Veil

== Film and TV ==
- One Life (1958 film) (French: Une vie), film adaption of the Maupassant story
- A Woman's Life (2016 film) (French: Une vie), a film directed by Stéphane Brizé

== Music ==
- Une vie (album), a 1971 album by Dalida, or the title song
- Une Vie (d'Art et d'Amour), compilation album by Maria Callas
- "Une Vie", theme song from One Life (1958 film)

== See also ==
- "Une vie d'amour" (A Life of Love), song written by Charles Aznavour
- Une vie meilleure, 2011 French film
- Une vie de chat, 2010 French animated film
- Une vie chinoise, French graphic novel
