= The Crimson Curtain =

The Crimson Curtain can refer to:

- Crimson Curtain (1952 film), a 1952 French film
- The Crimson Curtain (1953 film), a 1953 French film
