= Sentimental Education (film) =

1962 film

- Theatrical release poster
- French: L'Éducation sentimentale
- Directed by: Alexandre Astruc
- Screenplay by: Roger Nimier; Roland Laudenbach
- Produced by: Jean Tourane
- Starring: Jean-Claude Brialy; Marie-José Nat; Dawn Addams
- Cinematography: Jean Badal
- Edited by: Geneviève Vaury; Maryse Siclier
- Music by: Richard Cornu
- Production companies: Société Française de Cinématographie; UFA-Comacico; Produttori Associati Internazionali
- Distributed by: UFA-Comacico
- Release dates: 23 March 1962 (West Germany); 2 May 1962 (Italy); 19 September 1962 (France)
- Running time: 92 minutes
- Countries: France; Italy
- Language: French

Sentimental Education (French: L'Éducation sentimentale; released in the United Kingdom as Lessons in Love) is a 1962 drama film directed by Alexandre Astruc. The story focuses on a student who has an affair with a married middle-class woman whose husband cheats on her with a model. The film is loosely based on the 1869 novel of the same name by Gustave Flaubert. The screenplay was written by Roger Nimier with dialogue by Roland Laudenbach and Alain Astruc.

== Cast ==
- Jean-Claude Brialy as Frédéric Moreau
- Marie-José Nat as Anne Arnoux
- Dawn Addams as Catherine Dambreuse
- Michel Auclair as Didier Arnoux
- Carla Marlier as Barbara
- Pierre Dudan as Charles Dambreuse
