= Grand prix du cinéma =

Grand prix du cinéma may refer to the following French cinema awards:

- Grand prix du cinéma français (1934–1986) latterly eclipsed by the César Awards
- Informal name for Académie Française awards:
  - Prix Jean-Le-Duc (1972–1993) see former prizes awarded by the Académie française
  - René Clair Award (since 1994)
- Grand Prix du cinéma de création, best director award at the 1983 Cannes Film Festival

== See also ==
- Grand Prix (disambiguation)
- List of film awards § France
