= No Exit =

1944 play by Jean-Paul Sartre

- Vintage edition cover
- Original language: French
- Written by: Jean-Paul Sartre
- Characters: Joseph Garcin; Inèz Serrano; Estelle Rigault; Valet
- Genre: Existentialist
- Setting: A room in Hell

Premiere
- Date: 1944
- Place: France

No Exit (French: Huis clos, pronounced [ɥi klo]) is a 1944 existentialist French play by Jean-Paul Sartre. The play was first performed at the Théâtre du Vieux-Colombier in May 1944. The play centers on a depiction of the afterlife in which three deceased characters are punished by being locked into a room together for eternity. It is the source of Sartre's especially famous phrase "L'enfer, c'est les autres" or "Hell is other people", a reference to Sartre's ideas about the look and the perpetual ontological struggle of being caused to see oneself as an object from the view of another consciousness.

English translations have also been performed under the titles In Camera, No Way Out, Vicious Circle, Behind Closed Doors, and Dead End. The original title, Huis clos ('closed door'), is the French equivalent of the legal term in camera (from Latin, 'in a chamber'), referring to a private discussion behind closed doors.

== Plot ==
Three damned souls, Joseph Garcin, Inèz Serrano, and Estelle Rigault, are brought to the same room in Hell and locked inside by a mysterious valet. They had all expected torture devices to punish them for eternity, but instead, find a plain room furnished in the style of the French "Second Empire". At first, none of them will admit the reason for their damnation: Joseph says that he was executed for being an outspoken pacifist, while Estelle insists that a mistake has been made; Inèz, however, is the only one to demand that they all stop lying to themselves and confess to their moral crimes. She refuses to believe that they have all ended up in the room by accident and soon realizes that they have been placed together to make each other miserable. She deduces that they are to be one another's torturers.

Joseph suggests that they try to leave each other alone and to be silent, but Inèz starts to sing and Estelle vainly wants to find a mirror to check on her appearance. Inèz tries to seduce Estelle by offering to be her "mirror" by telling her everything she sees but ends up frightening her instead. It is soon clear that Inèz is attracted to Estelle, Estelle is attracted to Joseph, and Joseph is not attracted to either of the two women.

After arguing, they decide to confess to their crimes so they know what to expect from each other. Joseph cheated on and mistreated his wife, and was executed by firing squad for desertion; Inèz is a manipulative sadist who seduced her cousin's wife, Florence, while living with them and convinced her to leave her husband—the cousin was later hit and killed by a tram and Florence asphyxiated herself and Inèz by flooding the room with gas while they slept; and Estelle had an affair and then killed the resulting child, prompting the child's father to die by suicide. Despite their revelations, they continue to get on each other's nerves. Joseph finally begins giving in to the lascivious Estelle's escalating attempts to seduce him, which drives Inèz crazy. Joseph is constantly interrupted by his own guilt, however, and begs Estelle to tell him that he is not a coward for attempting to flee his country during wartime. While she complies, Inèz mockingly tells him that Estelle is just feigning attraction to him so that she can be with a man—any man.

This causes Joseph to abruptly attempt an escape. After he repeatedly tries to open the door, it suddenly and inexplicably opens, but he is unable to bring himself to leave. The others remain as well. He says that he will not be saved until he can convince Inèz that he is not cowardly. She refuses to be persuaded, observing that he is obviously a coward and promising to make him miserable forever. Joseph concludes that, rather than torture devices or physical punishment, "hell is other people." Estelle tries to persevere in her seduction of Joseph, but he says that he cannot have sex while Inèz is watching. Estelle, infuriated, picks up a paper knife and repeatedly stabs Inèz. Inèz chides Estelle, saying that they are all already dead, before Joseph finally concludes, "Eh bien, continuons..." ("Oh well, let's continue...").

== Characters ==
Joseph Garcin – He is a journalist who lived in the barracks in Rio and died after refusing to fight in an unnamed war. His cowardice and callousness caused his young wife to die "of grief" after his execution. He was unfaithful to his wife – he even recalls, without any sympathy, bringing home another woman one night, and his wife bringing them their morning coffee after hearing their engagement all night. Initially, he hates Inèz because she understands his weakness, and wants Estelle because he feels that if she treats him as a man he will become manly. However, by the end of the play he understands that because Inèz understands the meaning of cowardice and wickedness, only absolution at her hands can redeem him (if indeed redemption is possible). In a later translation and adaptation of the play by American translator Paul Bowles, Garcin is renamed Vincent Cradeau.

Inèz Serrano – Inèz is the second character to enter the room. A lesbian postal clerk, she turned a wife against her husband, twisting the wife's perception of her spouse and the subsequent death of the man who is also her cousin. Inèz seems to be the only character who understands the power of opinion, manipulating Estelle's and Garcin's opinions of themselves and of each other throughout the play. She is honest about the evil deeds she, Garcin, and Estelle have done. She frankly acknowledges the fact that she is a cruel person.

Estelle Rigault – Estelle is a high-society woman, who married an older man for his money and had an affair with a younger man. To her, the affair is merely an insignificant fling, but her lover becomes emotionally attached to her and she bears him a child. She drowns the child by throwing it off the balcony of a hotel into the sea, which drives her lover to commit suicide. Throughout the play she tries to get at Garcin, seeking to define herself as a woman in relation to a man. Her sins are deceit and murder (which also motivated a suicide). She lusts over "manly men", which Garcin himself strives to be.

Valet – The Valet enters the room with each character, but his only real dialogue is with Garcin. We learn little about him, except that his uncle is the head valet, and that his eyelids are atrophied because he does not blink.

== Critical reception ==
The play was widely praised when it was first performed. Upon its 1946 American premiere at the Biltmore Theatre, critic Stark Young described the play as "a phenomenon of the modern theatre – played all over the continent already", in The New Republic, and wrote that "It should be seen whether you like it or not."

Clive Barnes of the New York Times wrote in the 1960s: “When I first saw [it] about 20 years ago it seemed like a breath of fresh air in the theater. Now, renewing acquaintance with it at the Bouwerie Lane Theater, the fresh air seems stale and even Sartre’s theater has become a musty pulpit. It is still a play of ideas, but the ideas now seem well-thumbed and overused, and the dramatic gestures look shop-soiled and shabby….How original it first seemed when I saw it, in London actually, all those years ago….[the play] is an intellectual phony from start to finish. Its intellectual dishonesty comes in taking a simple idea—“Hell is other people”—and treating it literally, so that hell becomes not a figure of speech but a hotel room on the other side of the brimstone furnace. Moreover, the play is theatrically invalid, because once the audience knows the proposition, that hell is an eternity of absence, then it knows the outcome....what in those heady postwar days seemed new and exciting now is merely a bore. What was once so fashionable is now old-fashioned—which is the fate of everything fashionable.”

== Adaptations ==
=== Audio ===
- In 1946, the BBC broadcast a production with Alec Guinness as Garcin, Donald Pleasence as the Valet, Betty Ann Davies as Estelle and Beatrix Lehmann as Inèz, all of whom starred in the first London stage production (see below). The translation was by Margery Gerbain and Joan Swinstead.
- Riverside Records released a 2-LP recording of the Paul Bowles translation in 1961 (RLP 7004/5) with Douglas Watson as Garcin/Cradeau, Nancy Wickwire as Inèz, Betty Field as Estelle and "George Spelvin" as the Boy.
- In 1964, Deutsche Grammophon released a 2-LP recording of Huis Clos in French (43 902/3, later 2761 002) with a preface by Sartre spoken by the author himself, with Michel Vitold as Garcin, Christiane Lenier as Ines, Gaby Sylvia as Estelle and R.J. Chauffard as The Boy. Vitold and Chauffaud reprised their roles as Garcin and The Boy the following year in another audio production, this time with Judith Magre as Ines and Evelyne Rey as Estelle.
- In 1968, Caedmon Records released a 2-LP recording of the Paul Bowles translation directed by Howard Sackler (TRS 327), with Donald Pleasence as Garcin/Cradeau, Glenda Jackson as Inèz, Anna Massey as Estelle and Thomas Kampinski as The Bellman.
- On 17 April 2021, the Comédie-Française broadcast a production of Huis Clos directed by Clément Gaubert, with Anna Cervinka as Inès, Thierry Hancisse as Garcin, Elsa Lepoivre as Estelle and Nicolas Verdier as The Boy.

=== Film ===
- Huis clos (1954), directed by Jacqueline Audry
- No Exit (1962), directed by Tad Danielewski
- A Puerta Cerrada (Closed Door) (1962), Argentine film directed by Pedro Escudero
- Gizli Oturum (2012), directed by Merve Hurriyet

=== Television ===
- In 1964, the BBC broadcast "In Camera" as part of its The Wednesday Play anthology series, a translation by Stuart Gilbert adapted for television and directed by Philip Saville, with Harold Pinter as Garcin, Jane Arden as Inez, Catherine Woodville as Estelle and Jonathan Hansen as The Valet.
- In 1985, the BBC broadcast "Vicious Circle", a translation by Frank Hauser directed by Kenneth Ives, with Omar Sharif as Garcin, Jeanne Moreau as Ines, Cherie Lunghi as Estelle and Nickolas Grace as the Waiter.
- Mike Schur has compared his show The Good Place, which involves a demon trying to design a novel type of hell in which the inhabitants create one another's torments, to Sartre's play.

=== Theatre ===
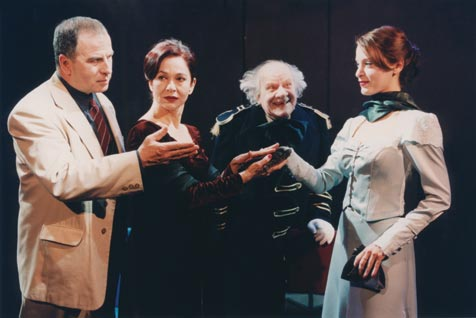
Kostas Triantafyllopoulos (Garcin), Smaragda Smyrnaiou (Inès), Giorgos Velentzas (Valet) and Maria Protopappa (Estelle) in a 2002 stage production in Athens, Greece

- The play first premiered in Paris, France 1944 at the Théâtre du Vieux-Colombier, starring Gaby Sylvia as Estelle, Tania Balachova (who was the ex-wife of director Raymond Rouleau) as Inez and Michel Vitold as Garcin.
- The first Broadway stage production, using the Paul Bowles translation, ran for three weeks in 1946 at the Biltmore Theatre and starred Claude Dauphin as Garcin, Peter Kass as the Bellboy, Ruth Ford as Estelle and Annabella as Inèz. The production was directed by John Huston.
- The first stage production in London was performed in 1946 under the title Vicious Circle at the Arts Theatre Club and starred Alec Guinness as Garcin, Donald Pleasence as the Valet, Betty Ann Davies as Estelle and Beatrix Lehmann as Inèz. The production was directed by Peter Brook and the translation was by Margery Gerbain and Joan Swinstead.
- A 1953 revival at the Ebony Showcase Theatre in Los Angeles featured James Edwards, Maidie Norman and Juanita Moore and was directed by Roy Budd.
- Robert Mandan starred in an off-Broadway revival in 1956 at Theatre East.
- In 1967, a production starring Raul Julia as Garcin/Cradeau played off-Broadway at the Bouwerie Lane Theatre. It played in repertory with The Little Private World of Arthur Fenwick by John A. Topa.
- In 1977, "Sonate à Trois (No Exit)", a ballet based on Huis Clos, choreographed by Maurice Béjart with music by Béla Bartók, was performed as part of Béjart: Ballet of the Twentieth Century at the Uris Theater in New York City.
- In 2018, after raising £4,558 through Kickstarter, a "Snowden"-inspired adaptation premiered at Drill Hall in Edinburgh and the Fringe.

=== Opera ===
A one-act chamber opera based on the play was created by composer Andy Vores. The production had its world premiere on April 25, 2008, at the Boston Conservatory's Zack Theatre. Vores' opera premiered in Chicago in October 2009 by Chicago Opera Vanguard.

=== Parodies ===
Talk Show from Hell, a modern parody by Jean-Noel Fenwick, was produced by the Open Fist Theatre in Los Angeles, California, in 2000.
