= Sentimental Education =

1869 novel by Gustave Flaubert

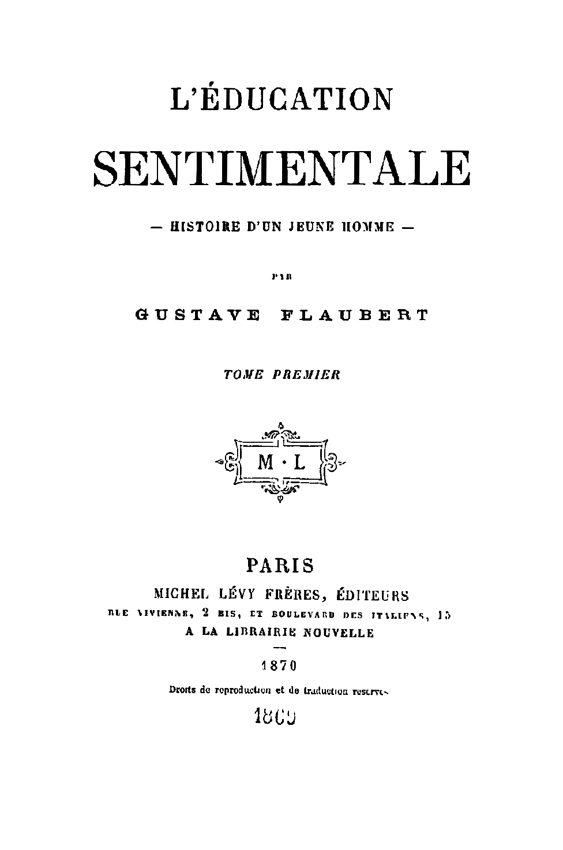
- Title page from the first edition of L'Education sentimentale
- Author: Gustave Flaubert
- Original title: L'Education sentimentale
- Language: French
- Genre: Realism
- Set in: Paris and Normandy, 1837–1867
- Publication date: 1869
- Publication place: France
- ISBN: 9781471727740
- Dewey Decimal: 843.8
- LC Class: PQ2246 .E4
- Preceded by: Salammbô
- Followed by: The Temptation of Saint Anthony
- Original text: L'Education sentimentale at French Wikisource

Sentimental Education: History of a Young Man (French: L'éducation sentimentale : histoire d'un jeune homme) is an 1869 novel by Gustave Flaubert. It focuses on the romantic life of a young man named Frédéric Moreau at the time of the French Revolution of 1848 and the founding of the Second French Empire. It describes Moreau's love for an older woman, a character based on the wife of the music publisher Maurice Schlesinger, who is portrayed in the book as Jacques Arnoux. The novel's tone is by turns ironic and pessimistic; it occasionally lampoons French society. The main character often gives himself over to romantic flights of fancy.

Considered one of the most influential novels of the 19th century, it was praised by contemporaries such as George Sand and Émile Zola, but criticised by Henry James.

== Background ==
Flaubert based many of the protagonist's experiences, including the romantic passion, on his own life. He wrote of the work in 1864: "I want to write the moral history of the men of my generation—or, more accurately, the history of their feelings. It's a book about love, about passion; but passion such as can exist nowadays—that is to say, inactive."

== Synopsis ==
=== Part 1 ===
Frédéric Moreau renews his acquaintance with a childhood friend, Deslauriers, who advises him to meet with Dambreuse, a rich Parisian banker. Frédéric leaves for Paris, armed with a letter of recommendation from his neighbour M. Roque, who works for Dambreuse. Despite this, his introduction to Dambreuse is not very successful. In Paris, Frédéric stumbles across a shop belonging to M. Arnoux, whose wife he developed a fascination for when he met her briefly at the start of the novel. However, he does not act on his discovery, and lives idly in Paris for some months. A little more than a year after the start of the story, Frédéric is at a student protest and meets Hussonnet, who works at M. Arnoux's shop. Frédéric becomes one of the friends of M. Arnoux who meet at the shop. Eventually, he is invited to dinner with M. and Mme Arnoux. At the same time, his old friend Deslauriers comes to Paris. Frédéric becomes obsessed with Mme. Arnoux. Deslauriers tries to distract him by taking him to a cabaret, where they encounter M. Arnoux and his mistress Mlle Vatnaz. Later, Frédéric is persuaded to return home to his mother, who is having financial difficulties. At home, he meets Louise, the daughter of his neighbour M. Roque. His financial worries are eased by the chance death of an uncle, and he leaves again for Paris.

=== Part 2 ===
Returning to Paris, Frédéric finds that M. and Mme Arnoux no longer live at their previous address. He searches the city, eventually meeting Regimbart, one of his group of friends. He learns that Arnoux has financial problems and is now a pottery merchant. Arnoux introduces Frédéric to another of his mistresses, Rosanette. Frédéric likes Rosanette, and has Pellerin paint him a portrait of her. Mme Arnoux learns of her husband's infidelity. Frédéric has promised money to Deslauriers, but lends it to Arnoux instead, who is unable to repay him. Deslauriers and Frédéric fall out. In an attempt to resolve the financial situation, Frédéric returns to Dambreuse, who this time offers him a position. However, Frédéric fails to keep his appointment, instead visiting Mme Arnoux at the pottery factory. She is unresponsive to his advances, and on his return to Paris he instead pursues Rosanette. His difficulties mount and eventually he meets again with Deslauriers, who advises him to return home. At home, Frédéric falls in love with and becomes engaged to Louise, his neighbour's daughter. Deslauriers conveys this news to Mme Arnoux, who is upset. Frédéric says he has business to complete in Paris. While there, he meets Mme Arnoux, and they admit their love for each other.

=== Part 3 ===
In the midst of the revolution, Frédéric's political writings win him the renewed respect of his friends and of M. Dambreuse. Frédéric, living with Rosanette, becomes jealous of her continued friendship with M. Arnoux, and persuades her to leave with him for the countryside. On his return, Frédéric dines at the Dambreuses' house with Louise and her father, who have come to Paris to find him. Louise learns of Frédéric's relationship with Rosanette. Frédéric meets with Mme Arnoux, who explains why she missed their arranged meeting. During this encounter, Rosanette appears and reveals she is pregnant. Frédéric decides to seduce Mme Dambreuse in order to gain social standing. He is successful, and soon afterwards M. Dambreuse dies. Rosanette's newborn child becomes severely ill and lives only a short time. Meanwhile, M. Arnoux has finally been overtaken by his financial difficulties and is preparing to flee the country. Unable to face the loss of Mme Arnoux, Frédéric asks for money from Mme Dambreuse, but is too late to stop M. and Mme Arnoux from leaving. Mme Dambreuse meanwhile discovers his motive for borrowing the money. Frédéric returns to his childhood home, hoping to find Louise there, but discovers that she has given up on him and married Deslauriers instead. Frédéric returns to Paris. Many years later, he briefly meets Mme Arnoux again, swearing his eternal love for her. After another interlude, he encounters Deslauriers and the novel ends the way it began, with the pair swapping stories of the past.

== Characters ==
The characters of Sentimental Education are marked by capriciousness and self-interest. Frédéric, the main character, is originally infatuated with Madame Arnoux, but throughout the novel falls in and out of love with her. Furthermore, he is unable to decide on a profession and instead lives on his uncle's inheritance. Other characters, such as Mr. Arnoux, are as capricious with business as Frédéric is with love. Without their materialism and "instinctive worship of power", almost the entire cast would be completely rootless. Such was Flaubert's judgment of his times, and the continuing applicability of that cynicism goes a long way in explaining the novel's enduring appeal.

=== Sequence of appearances ===
- Frédéric Moreau, the central character, a young man from provincial France, who begins and ends as a member of the middle class.
- Jacques Arnoux, publisher, faience manufacturer; also a speculator and a womanizer, "ill nearly all the time and [looks] like an old man" towards the end of the novel, and eventually dies a year before the novel's end.
- Mme Marie (Angèle) Arnoux, his wife, mother of two children, platonic affair with Frédéric, moves to Rome by the end of the novel. Always virtuous and honorable, completely devoted to her two children.
- Marthe Arnoux, their daughter
- M. Roque, land-owner and M. Dambreuse's unsavoury agent; father of Louise Roque.
- Louise (Elisabeth-Olympe-Louise) Roque, his red-headed daughter, a country girl; is passionately in love with Frédéric for a time, marries Deslauriers, leaves him for a singer.
- Charles Deslauriers, law student, close friend of Frederic, a lawyer by the end of the novel. Extremely ambitious but unable to realize his ambitions, he has a jealous, competitive and somewhat parasitical relationship with the more prosperous Frédéric.
- M. Dambreuse, banker, aristocratic politician, timeserver, financier. Dead in the third part of the novel.
- Mme Dambreuse, his much-younger, very determined, exquisite wife, with whom Frédéric has an affair and almost marries; after Frédéric breaks with her, toward the novel's end, she marries an Englishman.
- Baptiste Martinon, law student, a rich farmer's son, a reasonably hard-working careerist who ends up a senator by the end of the novel.
- Marquis de Cisy, nobleman and law student, a dapper youth, father of eight by the end of the novel.
- Sénécal, math teacher and uncompromising, puritanical, dogmatic Republican; supposedly dead by the end of the novel.
- Dussardier, a simple and honest shop worker. A committed Republican, he is an active participant in the protests and revolts throughout the book. He dies in the last of these protests we see, run through by Sénécal with his sword.
- Hussonnet, journalist, drama critic, clown, ends up controlling all the theatres and the whole press.
- Regimbart, "The Citizen", a boozy revolutionary chauvinist; becomes a ghost of a man.
- Pellerin, painter with more theories than talent; becomes a photographer.
- Mlle Vatnaz, actress, courtesan, frustrated feminist with literary pretensions; vanishes by the end of the novel.
- Dittmer, frequent guest of Arnoux
- Delmas or Delmar, actor, singer, showman (may also be the singer introduced in Chapter 1)
- M. and Mme Oudry, guests of the Arnoux
- Catherine, housekeeper for M. Roque
- Eléonore, mother of Louise Roque
- Uncle Barthélemy, wealthy uncle of Frédéric
- Eugène Arnoux, son of the Arnoux
- Rosanette (Rose-Annette) Bron, "The Marshal", courtesan with many lovers, e.g. M. Oudry; for a time Jacques Arnoux; later she has a lengthy affair with Frédéric. Their little son falls ill and dies in the third part of the novel.
- Clémence, Deslauriers' mistress
- Marquis Aulnays, Cisy's godfather; M. de Forchambeaux, his friend; Baron de Comaing, another friend; M. Vezou, his tutor
- Cécile, officially the "niece" of the Dambreuses, in reality M. Dambreuse's illegitimate daughter. Towards the end of the novel she is married to Martinon. Hated by Madame Dambreuse, but favored by her father, she inherits his fortune after his death (much to Mme's outrage).
- Another "character": Mme Arnoux's Renaissance silver casket, first noted at her house, then at Rosanette's, finally bought at auction by Mme Dambreuse

== Allusions ==
Early in the novel, Frédéric compares himself to several popular romantic protagonists of late 18th-century and early 19th-century literature: Young Werther (1774) by Goethe, René (1802) by Chateaubriand, Lara (1824) by Byron, Lélia (1833/1839) by George Sand and Frank of "La Coupe et les Lèvres" (1832) by Alfred de Musset. His friend Deslauriers also asks Frédéric to "remember" Rastignac from Balzac's Comédie humaine, and Frédéric asks Mlle. Louise Roque if she still has her copy of Don Quixote.

== Literary significance and reception ==
Henry James, an early and passionate admirer of Flaubert, considered the book a large step down from its famous predecessor. "Here the form and method are the same as in Madame Bovary; the studied skill, the science, the accumulation of material, are even more striking; but the book is in a single word a dead one. Madame Bovary was spontaneous and sincere; but to read its successor is, to the finer sense, like masticating ashes and sawdust. L'Education Sentimentale is elaborately and massively dreary. That a novel should have a certain charm seems to us the most rudimentary of principles, and there is no more charm in this laborious monument to a treacherous ideal than there is interest in a heap of gravel."

György Lukács in his 1971 Theory of the Novel found L'Education Sentimentale quintessentially modern in its handling of time as passing in the world and as perceived by the characters.

In 2008, American literary critic James Wood dedicated two chapters of his book How Fiction Works to Flaubert's significance. The first chapter, "Flaubert and the Modern Narrative", begins: "Novelists should thank Flaubert the way poets thank spring: it all begins again with him. There really is a time before Flaubert and a time after him. Flaubert established, for good or ill, what most readers think of as modern realist narration, and his influence is almost too familiar to be visible. We hardly remarked of good prose that it favors the telling and a brilliant detail; that it privileges a high degree of visual noticing; that it maintains an unsentimental composure and knows how to withdraw, like a good valet, from superfluous commentary; that it judges good and bad neutrally; that it seeks out the truth, even at the cost of repelling us; and that the author's fingerprints on all this are, paradoxically, traceable but not visible. You can find some of this in Defoe or Austen or Balzac, but not all of it until Flaubert."

French sociologist Pierre Bourdieu made a map of the novel's social spaces, linking social organization to literary space.

== English Translations ==
=== Public Domain ===
1. D. F. Hannigan (1898), published by H.S. Nichols
2. Anonymous (sometimes attributed to M. Walter Dunne) (1903/4)
3. Anthony Goldsmith (1922), published by Everyman's Library

=== In Copyright ===
1. Robert Baldick (1964), published by Penguin Classics
2. Perdita Burlingame (1974), published by Signet Classics, often including an afterword by F. W. Dupee.
3. Douglas Parmée (1989), published by Oxford World's Classics
4. Geoffrey Wall (a revision of Robert Baldick) (2004), published by Penguin Classics
5. Helen Constantine (2016), published by Oxford World's Classics
6. Raymond N. MacKenzie (2023), published by the University of Minnesota Press

== Film, TV, or theatrical adaptations ==
- Sentimental Education - 1962 French production directed by Alexandre Astruc, loosely based on the novel
- Sentimental Education - 1970 British mini-series
- L'Education sentimentale - 1973 French mini-series
