= Pierre Billard =

French journalist, film critic and historian of cinema (1922–2016)

- Born: 3 July 1922; Dieppe
- Died: 10 November 2016 (aged 94); Paris
- Occupations: Journalist; Film critic

Pierre Billard (3 July 1922 – 10 November 2016) was a French journalist, film critic and historian of cinema.

== Career ==
Born in Dieppe (Seine-Maritime), Pierre Billard followed the courses of resistant Valentin Feldman during the Occupation of France. They would become close and the teaching of Feldman marked him permanently. He then went to study at the Sorbonne, before specializing in cinema.

President of the "Fédération française des ciné-clubs" from 1952, in 1954 he founded the magazine Cinéma (revue), of which he was chief editor from Cinéma 54 to Cinéma 67. After he worked as journalist and film critic for Les Nouvelles littéraires, Candide and L'Express, he was one of the cofounders of the weekly Le Point where he directed the cultural pages until 1987. In the early 1980s, he was also editor-in-chief of the professional weekly magazine Le Film français.

Pïerre Billard has taught the history of cinema at the Institut d'études politiques de Paris and published several books including Louis Malle, le rebelle solitaire. He is the father of journalist and historian of cinema, Jean-Michel Frodon.

In 1995, he published the book L’Âge classique du cinéma français, in conjunction with that of his son Jean-Michel, L'Âge moderne du cinéma français. This book which deals with French cinema from 1928, that is the advent of sound film, until 1959, can be considered as a "reference tool" during this period. There he worked as a "historian", seeking to show with neutrality and without addressing the critical point of view, the influences of the economy, politics or culture on French cinema. Les Inrockuptibles consider "exciting" the part that touches the first talking films, noting that the author is more reserved about what concerns the French cinema of the 1950s. He particularly dealt with René Clair and Jean Renoir. He died on 10 November 2016 at the age of 94.

== Publications ==
- 1958: Vamps, L'Art du Siècle
- 1966: Jean Grémillon, Anthologie du cinéma
- 1995: L'Âge classique du cinéma français, Flammarion; René Clair Award
- 1997: D'or et de palmes, le Festival de Cannes, series "Découvertes Gallimard" vol. 314, Éditions Gallimard
- 1998: Le Mystère René Clair, Plon
- 1999: Astérix & Obélix contre César, l'histoire d'un film, Paris, Plon
- 2003: Louis Malle, le rebelle solitaire, Plon; Prix Goncourt de la Biographie
- 2006: André Gide et Marc Allégret, le roman secret, Plon
