= Dynamo Duck =

Fictional character

Dynamo Duck (French: Saturnin le canard) was the main character in the children's series The Adventures of Dynamo Duck, which aired on television in the early 1990s.

== Overview ==
The origin of the series lies with the French film maker Jean Tourane. During the 1960s, he filmed for a children's television series Saturnin le canard about the duckling Saturnin who had all kinds of adventures. The series was produced using real animals, dressed up with sunglasses, hats, etcetera, inside a miniature world. The series, first produced in 1964 (according to the Internet Movie Database) was shown on French television.

Years later, the footage was bought by the American producer Nathan Sassover. Originally, clips of it, with voices re-dubbed, were used as bumpers leading into and out of commercials on the Fox Kids network. Later, Sassover had the different pieces of film edited in a new way and hired writers to create new characters and storylines to produce a James Bond-style show in a series of two-minute shorts. Again, a small duck was the main character, fighting crimes of the evil Dr. Mortek (a monkey) and other assorted villains. The animals wander around on miniature sets with scale models of trucks and other vehicles. The duck, this time going by the name of "Dynamo Duck", was driving around in a miniature Jaguar.

What makes this series unique prior to the advent of computer animation was the way the mouth movements of the animals, specifically the ducks, with the precise dialog dubbed in gives the appearance of the animals speaking. The principal duckling was voiced-over by Dan Castellaneta, using a terse, clipped style parodying The Untouchables' Robert Stack. The first season aired in 1991 on Fox Kids. The shorts aired once a week during the Fox Kids' Saturday morning line-up in between the half-hour programs. Where it appeared on the schedule wasn't announced and aired at inconsistent times. Even the promo for the series narrated by Dynamo says "Saturday mornings on FOX", but no specific time ever revealed. For fans to follow and collect the series, it was often necessary to record the entire morning line-up so as not to miss it. At the end of every show, Dynamo Duck said "We take care of our animals, and so should you!". The second season of Dynamo Duck is widely regarded as vastly inferior to the first that relied more heavily on reuse of footage, and recycled storylines. Dynamo's voice-over was modified in a manner similar to Don Adams' Get Smart role of Maxwell Smart. There are over 100 shorts in the series.

Later, in the mid-1990s, the series had a brief afterlife airing overnights on the now defunct Network One (N1). The episodes were five minutes in length, including end credits. Many of which were expansions of their two-minute counterparts from Fox Kids. Some combined two two-minute shorts to make a five-minute double episode with bridges either at the beginning, middle or end of each story, or a combination thereof. Due to the limited number of indie and low-powered stations that carried Network One, the series aired nearly unnoticed except by night owls.

The scoring was provided by a number of composers often multiple people on the same shorts, including: Thomas Chase, Steve Rucker, Nathan Sassover, Paul Menichini, Misho Segal, Peter Frampton, et al.

== The characters and their roles ==
Dynamo Duck is the top secret agent of D.U.X., which stands for Dynamic Undercover Excellence. Dynamo's nemesis, Dr. Mortek, is the leader of S.K.U.Z., which is Sleazy Killers, Usurpers, and Zealots. It was also referred to as the Society of Killers, Usurpers and Zealots. Many other crime and espionage organizations were known by their acronyms. Such as H.O.A.X. (the Horrible Organization Against Excellence), S.N.O.B. (the Secret Nefarious Order of Blowhards), Y.A.H.O.O. (Yokels Against Happiness, Optimism and Order), G.O.O.F.U.S. (Goons On the Orders to Foul Up Society), T.O.X.I.C. (Totally Obnoxious, Extremely Insidious Criminals), W.H.O.M. (Wiley Horrendous Obnoxious Maniacs), L.U.S.H. (Low, Underhanded Sot-faced Hitmen), and S.N.O.R.E. (Slumbering Nemesis Of Righteousness Everywhere). The Loonies are a religious cult living like medieval knights. Loonies is not an acronym. Many of the agents working for these organizations were, but not limited to, weasels.

Good guys	Title	Species
Dynamo Duck	Agent	duckling
The Chief	Chief of DUX	guinea pig
Number Two	DUX's Second-In-Command	guinea pig
Thomas	Inventor	guinea pig
Edison	Inventor	guinea pig
Lenny	Mechanic	frog
Flash	Agent	turtle
Orwell	Oracle	goldfish
Barbara	Dynamo's main mallard	duckling
Updraft McKilt	Inventor	guinea pig
Finsterbush	Agent	guinea pig
Professor Sand	Inventor	cat
Maxie	Assistant to Prof. Sand	dog
Sean O'Conner	Dynamo's father	duckling
J. Edgar Hooter	Head of Covert Operations	guinea pig
Marley	Agent	guinea pig
Morris	Agent	cat
Orange	Agent	guinea pig
Bugsy	Agent	rabbit
Funny Money	Secretary	Barbie-like doll
Sluggo	Agent	snail
Mervin	Magician	guinea pig
D.T.	Alien	mouse
Cosmarina	Alien	duckling
Sigmunda Fraulein	DUX Psychologist	vulture

Bad guys	Affiliation	Species
Dr. Mortek	SKUZ leader	monkey
Dr. Snow	SKUZ	albino weasel
Doc Fungus	SKUZ	duckling
Karloff	SKUZ/HOAX	weasel
Rupert Flybreath	SKUZ	lizard
Scamalot	SKUZ	weasel
Cuss Cowchip	SKUZ	weasel
Rufus Razorback	SKUZ	weasel
Dilroy Dunk	SKUZ	weasel
Frostbite	SKUZ	weasel
Manny Mankwrench	SKUZ	weasel
Sir Rib Howitzer	SKUZ	weasel
Glowfeld	SKUZ	weasel
Roughhouse	SKUZ	weasel
Bianca Bombshell	SKUZ	albino weasel
Ivan Tobealonesky	SKUZ/HOAX	albino weasel
Lucinda Wild	SKUZ	albino weasel
Karutek	SKUZ	chimpanzee
Helena Handbag	HOAX	vulture
Nostrilomus	HOAX	weasel
Cecil Thru DeMill	HOAX	guinea pig
Hooter Hornsby	HOAX	weasel
Brubaker	SKUZ/HOAX	weasel
Brauma Llama	HOAX	albino weasel
Carlotta Call	HOAX	weasel
Smokey DuBois	HOAX	weasel
Mel Odorous	REEK	weasel
Cockeye	REEK	weasel
Conrad Crud	YAHOO	weasel
Oliver & Neville	SNOB	roosters
L. Ron Hubbub	TOXIC	weasel
Dr. Know	WHOM leader	owl
Hypnocat	many	Siamese cat
The Rocko Brothers	family gangsters	rabbits
Sir Loin	LOONEY leader	weasel
Sir Real	LOONEY	guinea pig
Sir Round	LOONEY	guinea pig
Pussy Malone	Pussy Willows leader	cat
Odd Paws	Pussy Willows	cat
Dog-Meat Mancini	Pussy Willows	cat
Agent Hiss	Pussy Willows	cat
Katz Paw	Pussy Willows	cat
