= René Clair Award =

French film award

René Clair Award (French: Prix René-Clair) is an award instituted in 1994 and presented by the Académie française for achievements in the field of cinema. The prize was named after the French filmmaker René Clair. Each year, the winner of the prize is rewarded for the “whole of his cinematographic work”. Two special cases should however be noted, the awarding of two vermeil medals in 1995 to Pierre Billard on the one hand, and to Jean-Michel Frodon on the other, for critical works devoted to cinema.

== Recipients ==
- 1994: Alexandre Astruc
- 1995: Robert Bresson
- 1995: Pierre Billard (awarded vermeil medal for his work: L'Âge classique du cinéma français. Du cinéma parlant à la Nouvelle vague)
- 1995: Jean-Michel Frodon (awarded vermeil medal for his work: L'Âge moderne du cinéma français. De la Nouvelle Vague à nos jours)
- 1996: Edouard Molinaro
- 1997: Jacques Rozier
- 1998: Costa-Gavras
- 1999: Roman Polanski
- 2000: Patrice Leconte
- 2001: Agnès Jaoui and Jean-Pierre Bacri
- 2002: Agnès Varda
- 2003: André Téchiné
- 2004: Alain Corneau
- 2005: Claude Chabrol
- 2009: Agnès Varda
- 2010: Xavier Giannoli
- 2011: Danièle Thompson
- 2012: Benoît Jacquot
- 2013: Philippe Le Guay
- 2014: Robert Guédiguian
- 2015: Jacques Perrin
- 2016: Anne Fontaine
- 2017: Stéphane Brizé
- 2018: Bruno Dumont
- 2019: Valeria Bruni Tedeschi
- 2020: Xavier Dolan
- 2021: Albert Dupontel
- 2022: Arnaud Desplechin
- 2023: Cédric Klapisch
- 2024: Pascal Bonitzer
- 2025: Michel Hazanavicius
- 2026: François Ozon
