= Une vie (novel) =

1893 novel by Guy de Maupassant

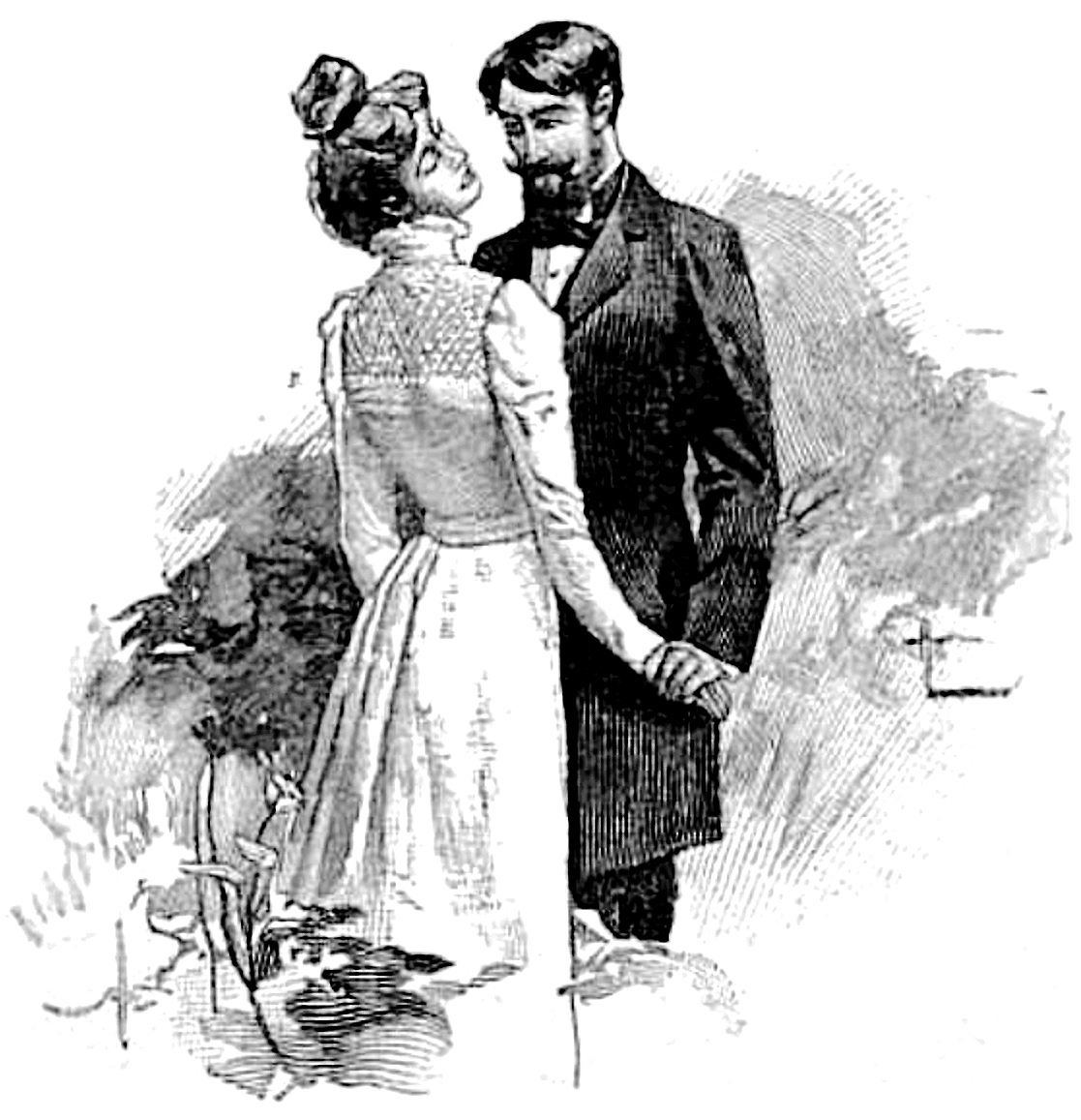
Une vie

Une vie ('One Life' or 'A Life') also known as L'Humble Vérité ('The Humble Truth') and often translated as A Woman's Life, is the first novel written by Guy de Maupassant. It was serialised in 1883 in the Gil Blas, then published in book form the same year as L'Humble Vérité.

It was the basis for the 1958 film One Life, directed by Alexandre Astruc, an award-winning 2016 film directed by Stéphane Brizé, as well as a 2019 play directed by Arnaud Denis and starring Clémentine Célarié.

== Characters ==
- Jeanne – a Norman gentlewoman who lives by the sea at her family mansion, The Poplars. Described looking like a painting of Paolo Veronese, Jeanne spent her teens living in a convent to preserve her innocence.
- Baron Simon-Jacques Le Perthuis des Vauds – Jeanne’s father, pantheistic liberal aristocrat with a particular aversion to the Church.
- Baroness Adelaide – Jeanne’s mother. Struggling with obesity and poor health, her life is centered around gossip about other aristocratic families and a stack of old letters she always keeps by her side.
- Rosalie – Jeanne’s foster-sister and also her chambermaid. Described as tall, strong and strapping like a boy.
- Viscount, Julien de Lamare – Jeanne’s suitor and later husband, handsome, cruel, stingy and a womanizer.
- Aunt Lison – Jeanne’s old maid aunt, who is so uninteresting that it is said that people forget that she is around. Lison visits the Poplars for a few months every year.
- Abbe Picot – elderly village priest. Tolerant and pragmatic, he has made peace with the villagers straying from the Church’s dogma regarding sexual relations.
- Abbe Tolbiac – young priest who replaces Picot. He is fanatical and uncompromising, often displaying cruelty and hunger for power.
- Paul – Jeanne’s son. Spoiled by his “three mothers” – Jeanne, the Baron and Aunt Lison – he grows up to be selfish, irresponsible and addicted to gambling.
- Countess and Count Fourville – another aristocratic couple who befriend Jeanne and Julien.

== Plot ==
Jeanne is a sheltered and naive aristocratic girl consumed by fanciful romantic ideas about her future. She lives with her parents, the Baron and the Baroness, on their family estate called the Poplars - an old country mansion by the sea in Normandy. A handsome young Viscount, Julien, starts courting Jeanne. Although, flesh and blood Julien does not quite live up to her vague romantic fantasy life, Jeanne convinces herself she is in love. She agrees to marry Julien and they go on a honeymoon in Corsica. There she has her sexual awaking by a waterfall - the first and only time in her life she actually enjoys intercourse.

Upon their return to the Poplars, Jeanne is hopeful and excited about her married future, but Julien's personality changes rapidly. Having taken over the household, he is rude, stingy and cruel to servants. He is also less and less interested in Jeanne. One day Jeanne's childhood maid, Rosalie, whom Jeanne considers a kind of surrogate sister, suddenly collapses and surprises everyone by giving a spontaneous birth. Julien is eager to banish Rosalie for disgracing herself by having a child out of wedlock. But Jeanne insists that they help Rosalie and her baby. She also makes it her mission to find out the name of the scoundrel who dishonored Rosalie.

One night, delirious with fever, Jeanne stumbles around the house looking for Rosalie and finds her in Julien's bed. Distraught, Jeanne runs out of the house into the cold night and, upon reaching a cliff, contemplates suicide. Only the thought of hurting her mother, stops Jeanne from jumping. Jeanne is brought home, drugged and told by Julien that she imagined everything. Jeanne's parents believe Julien at first. Then the village priest, Abbe Picot, is summoned. Knowing that Rosalie will not lie in front of the priest, Jeanne forces her maid to admit to sleeping with her husband in front of the Baron and Baroness. Rosalie confesses. The Baron exiles Rosalie from the Poplars but also gives her a large chunk of land making her a desirable bride - even with a child. Meanwhile, the priest assuages the Baron's anger at Julien by pointing out that all men cheat on their wives and even accusing the Baron of doing the same - which the Baron knows is true. Julien is quickly forgiven. Rosalie is married off. Jeanne learns that her sickness on that fateful night was due to being pregnant as well. Her parents and the priest convince Jeanne to give Julien another chance for the sake of their child.

Upon giving birth to her son, Paul, Jeanne decides that her child will be her sole focus and reason for living. Suffering from obesity, the Baroness, collapses and dies suddenly. Inconsolable, Jeanne stays the night with the corpse of her mother. She is suddenly inspired to read the stash of old letters which her mother treasured. From the letters Jeanne learns that her mother had an affair. Jeanne feels betrayed by her mother. This contributes to her growing disgust with human sexuality which Jeanne increasingly views as base and immoral.

Nevertheless, Jeanne wants to have another child but does not know how to convince her husband who does not even want Paul, let alone more children. Abbe Picot advises Jeanne to fake being pregnant, which will lead Julien letting down his guard. This method works and Jeanne gets pregnant again but miscarries.

Julien introduces Jeanne to another aristocratic couple their age who live within horse-riding distance of them. The Countess is lively and deeply affectionate toward Jeanne, while the Count is a redheaded giant - awkward but deeply in love with his wife. Jeanne and Julien grow fonder and fonder of their neighbors, until one day Jeanne realizes that Julien and the Countess are having an affair.

Abbe Picot, the village priest - earthy, tolerant and pragmatic - retires due to his age. He is replaced by the much younger Abbe Tolbiac - a raging zealot who is furious with the village's relaxed sexual mores and makes it his mission to reform everyone. He quickly alienates most of the peasants, who stop coming to his church. The Baron, who detests organized religion, makes it his mission to undermine the new priest. But Jeanne finds the fanatic's uncompromising passion comforting - after all, her experiences with sexual relations made her detest them too. One day the priest confronts Jeanne about Julien's infidelity. He shames Jeanne for tolerating his husband's affair while she tries to explain to him that there is nothing she can do to stop it. The priest leaves, unsatisfied with her excuses. Between Jeanne putting up with Julien's affair and the Baron's anti-religious campaign, the priest becomes an avowed enemy of the family.

One night during a storm, Julien and the Countess sneak away to a small hut by a cliff. The Count, clearly told about his wife's affair by Tolbiac, storms into Jeanne's house and demands to see his wife. Jeanne cannot help him, so he rides off and finds the hut by the sea where his wife and Julien are weathering the storm. In a fit of rage, the Count pushes the hut off the edge of the cliff and rides off. Julien and the Countess are crushed to death on the cliff inside their hut. Everyone assumes it is an accident caused by the storm, except for Jeanne, who knows that the Count killed them.

One day the war of ideas between the Baron and the young priest comes to a boiling point. Tolbiac is infuriated by a young unmarried couple who refuse to heed to his moralizing, then completely loses it when he sees a group of children cheer on a dog giving birth. Overcome with hate for all things "flesh", Tolbiac beats the dog to death, literally squeezing the last puppy out of her while he strangles her. The Baron intervenes, hitting and cursing the priest. Only puppy survives and Jeanne keeps it, naming him Murder.

Together Jeanne, the Baron and Jeanne's unmarried aunt, Lison, raise Jeanne's son Paul. The "three mothers" as Paul calls them, spoil him senseless. When Paul grows up Jeanne finds out that he is forging letters from her and a doctor excusing him from school while he is skipping classes, gambling and visiting prostitutes. Eventually, Paul is in so much debt, that in order to save him the Baron starts selling off their family properties. More and more land is sold off. But Paul continues to gamble everything away. He now lives in Paris with a young woman that Jeanne calls "the slut". First the Baron dies, then aunt Lison.

Jeanne, inconsolably depressed and lost, is reunited with her old maid and childhood friend, Rosalie. It turns out Rosalie's marriage turned out better than Jeanne's and her son grew up to be a decent and hard working young man. Rosalie did well by herself with the acres of land that the Baron gave her. Rosalie becomes Jeanne's new caretaker. She takes over her finances, making sure that Jeanne does not spend unwisely. She also stops enabling Paul's poor life choices. But Jeanne's finances are still in ruins from Paul's gambling. Rosalie is forced to sell the Poplars - one more heartbreaking loss that Jeanne can hardly bare. She is forced to leave her childhood home and move to a smaller house in a different town. Jeanne is resigned to live out her life in misery. She misses the sea which she could see and smell from the Poplars. Paul continues to write only when he needs to be bailed out - he has not visited his mother in seven years. Jeanne decides to come to Paris herself and try to convince Paul to come back and live with her. But when she arrives, Paul and his mistress have already left to escape paying their debts. Jeanne asks people for help in finding Paul. Instead, she gets a procession of visits from Paul's debtors who demand that she pay up for her son. She does and so loses all the money she brought with herself to Paris.

After returning from Paris, Jeanne loses all desire to live. But Rosalie reminds her that she is fortunate comparing to poor women - she does not have to work all day and starve to death when she is too old to work as is the fate of many poor women. A letter comes from Paul - his lover is pregnant. He asks Jeanne to come take the baby which he does not know how to raise. Rosalie goes to fetch the child. The child's mother dies during labor. Rosalie returns to the child which instantly brings overwhelming joy into Jeanne's life. The novel ends with ever pragmatic Rosalie's line: "Life is never as good or as bad as one thinks."

== Legacy ==
Leo Tolstoy called Une Vie "an excellent novel, not only incomparably the best novel by Maupassant, but almost the best French novel since Hugo's Les Misérables."
