= The Gutter (1938 film) =

1938 film

- Directed by: Maurice Lehmann; Claude Autant-Lara
- Written by: Jean Aurenche; Michel Duran
- Based on: The Gutter by Pierre Wolff
- Produced by: Maurice Lehmann
- Starring: Françoise Rosay; Michel Simon; Gaby Sylvia; Ginette Leclerc
- Cinematography: Michel Kelber
- Edited by: Victoria Posner
- Music by: Tiarko Richepin; Vincent Scotto
- Production company: Productions Maurice Lehmann
- Distributed by: Les Distributeurs Français
- Release date: 29 October 1938
- Running time: 100 minutes
- Country: France
- Language: French

The Gutter or The Stream (French: Le ruisseau) is a 1938 French drama film directed by Maurice Lehmann and Claude Autant-Lara and starring Françoise Rosay, Michel Simon, Gaby Sylvia and Ginette Leclerc. It is based on the 1907 play of the same title by Pierre Wolff. It was shot at the Epinay Studios in Paris and on location around Le Havre in Normandy. The film's sets were designed by the art director René Renoux. The play had previously been adapted as a 1919 American silent film The Virtuous Model and a 1929 French silent Le Ruisseau.

== Cast ==
- Françoise Rosay as Régina Berri
- Michel Simon as Le comte Edouard de Bourgogne dit 'L'Escargot'
- Gaby Sylvia as Denise
- Ginette Leclerc as Ginette
- Georges Lannes as Ricardo
- Paul Cambo as Paul Prébant
- Bernard Blier as Le chauffeur de taxi
- Yves Deniaud as Le garçon de cabaret

== Bibliography ==
- Bessy, Maurice & Chirat, Raymond. Histoire du cinéma français: encyclopédie des films, Volume 2. Pygmalion, 1986.
- Crisp, Colin. Genre, Myth and Convention in the French Cinema, 1929-1939. Indiana University Press, 2002.
- Rège, Philippe. Encyclopedia of French Film Directors, Volume 1. Scarecrow Press, 2009.
