= No Exit (1954 film) =

1954 film

- Directed by: Jacqueline Audry
- Written by: Jean-Paul Sartre; Pierre Laroche
- Produced by: Edmond Ténoudji
- Starring: Arletty; Gaby Sylvia; Franck Villard
- Cinematography: Robert Juillard
- Edited by: Marguerite Beaugé
- Music by: Joseph Kosma
- Production company: Les Films Marceau
- Distributed by: Les Films Marceau
- Release date: 22 December 1954
- Running time: 95 minutes
- Country: France
- Language: French

No Exit (French: Huis-clos) is a 1954 French drama film directed by Jacqueline Audry and starring Arletty, Gaby Sylvia and Franck Villard. It was adapted by Pierre Laroche and Jean-Paul Sartre from Sartre's stage play.

== Cast ==
- Arletty as Inès Serrano, a lesbian
- Gaby Sylvia as Estelle Rigaud, a murderer
- Franck Villard as Joseph Garcin, a good-for-nothing
- Yves Deniaud as le garçon d'étage (the Valet)
- Nicole Courcel as Olga, Estelle's best friend
- Danièle Delorme as Florence, the lover of Inès
- Jean Debucourt as the general
- Jacques Chabassol as Pierre, a young man besotted with Estelle
- Arlette Thomas as Mme Garcin, Joseph's wife
- Louis de Funès (uncredited)

== See also ==
- No Exit (1962)
