= Edmond Ténoudji =

French Algerian film producer (1902–1986)

- Born: 22 June 1902; Constantine, French Algeria
- Died: 22 April 1986 (aged 83); Paris, France
- Other name: Zebouloune Sadok Cohen Ténoudji
- Occupation: Producer
- Years active: 1951–1982 (film)

Edmond Ténoudji (22 June 1902 – 22 April 1986) was a French Algerian film producer. He controlled the Les Films Marceau film production and distribution company active in the postwar era. He was also involved with Cocinor. In 1965 he served on the Cannes Film Festival Jury.

== Selected filmography ==
- Good Enough to Eat (1951)
- Love and Desire (1951)
- Village Feud (1951)
- Shadow and Light (1951)
- The Red Rose (1951)
- Boum sur Paris (1953)
- No Exit (1954)
- Les mauvaises rencontres (1955)
- The Price of Love (1955)
- Cela s'appelle l'aurore (1956)
- Until the Last One (1957)
- Prey for the Shadows (1961)
- The Game of Truth (1961)
- The Duke's Gold (1965)
- Love in the Night (1968)
- Not Dumb, The Bird (1972)
- Je hais les blondes (1982)

== Bibliography ==
- Basquin, Kit Smyth. Mary Ellen Bute: Pioneer Animator. Indiana University Press, 2020.
- Marie, Michel. The French New Wave: An Artistic School. John Wiley & Sons, 2008.
- Merigeau, Pascal. Jean Renoir: A Biography. Hachette, 2017.
