= Avalanche (1951 film) =

- Directed by: Raymond Segard
- Written by: Henri Decoin
- Produced by: Bernard Thévenot
- Starring: Frank Villard; Gaby Sylvia; José de Almeyda
- Cinematography: Roger Arrignon
- Edited by: Janine Ginet
- Music by: Marcel Stern
- Production company: Sidéral Films
- Distributed by: Films Roger Richebé
- Release date: 29 June 1951
- Running time: 75 minutes
- Country: France
- Language: French

Avalanche is a 1951 French drama film directed by Raymond Segard and written by Henri Decoin. starring Frank Villard, Gaby Sylvia and José de Almeyda.

== Cast ==
- Frank Villard as Edouard Bouchard
- Gaby Sylvia as Wanda Bouchard
- José de Almeyda as Rémy Couttet
- José Fabert
- Julienne Paroli as Mme Coutet

== Bibliography ==
- Rège, Philippe. Encyclopedia of French Film Directors, Volume 1. Scarecrow Press, 2009.
