= Les mauvaises rencontres =

- Directed by: Alexandre Astruc
- Screenplay by: Alexandre Astruc; Roland Laudenbach
- Based on: The Cautious Maiden by Cécil Saint-Laurent
- Produced by: Edmond Ténoudji
- Starring: Anouk Aimée
- Cinematography: Robert Lefebvre
- Edited by: Maurice Serein
- Music by: Maurice Le Roux
- Production company: Les Films Marceau
- Distributed by: Les Films Marceau
- Release date: 21 October 1955
- Running time: 84 minutes
- Country: France
- Language: French

Les mauvaises rencontres (English: Bad Liaisons) is a 1955 French drama film directed by Alexandre Astruc and starring Anouk Aimée. It tells the story of an ambitious journalist who has sacrificed her emotional life for the sake of her career. The story is told through flashbacks during a police interrogation. The film is based on the novel The Cautious Maiden by Cécil Saint-Laurent. Filming took place from 7 March to 7 May 1955.

The film was shown in competition at the 16th Venice International Film Festival and won the award for Most Promising New Director. It was released in France on 21 October 1955.

== Cast ==
- Anouk Aimée as Catherine Racan
- Jean-Claude Pascal as Blaise Walter
- Philippe Lemaire as Alain Bergère
- Gaby Sylvia as Hélène Ducouret
- Claude Dauphin as Doctor Jacques Daniéli
- Giani Esposito as Pierre Jaeger
- Yves Robert as Inspector Forbin
- Michel Piccoli as an Inspector
