= Gaby Sylvia =

Italian actress (1920–1980)

- Born: 24 March 1920; Cesena, Italy
- Died: 26 July 1980 (aged 60); Chamalières, France
- Other name: Gabriella Zignani
- Occupation: Actress
- Years active: 1938 - 1979 (film)

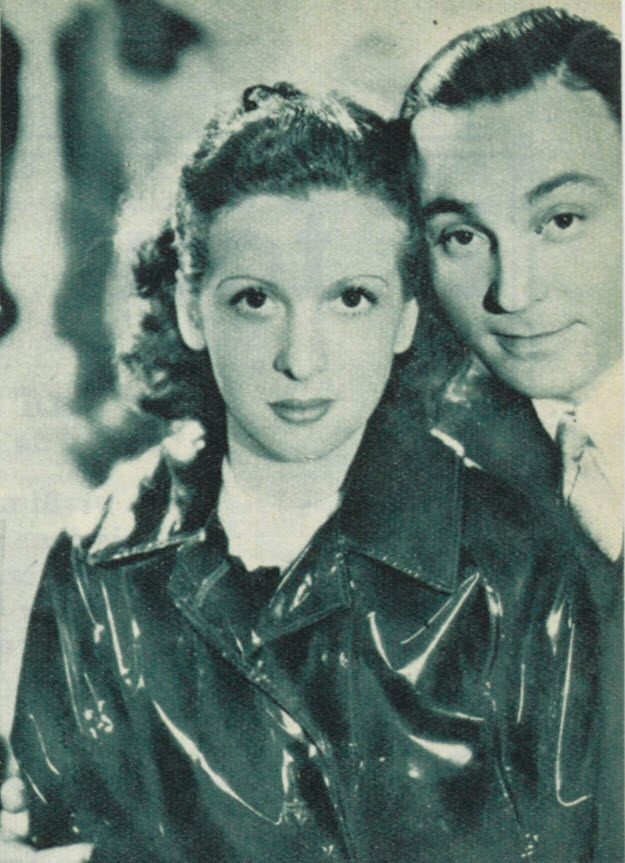
Gaby Sylvia and Andrex in the movie "Behind the Facade", 1939

Gaby Sylvia (March 24, 1920 – July 26, 1980) was an Italian actress who appeared in many French films and television series.

== Partial filmography ==
- The Gutter (1938) - Denise
- Behind the Façade (1939) - Madeleine Martin
- Facing Destiny (1940) - Madeleine Clairvoix
- First Ball (1941) - Danielle Noblet
- Signé illisible (1942) - Monique Lavergne
- Bonsoir mesdames, bonsoir messieurs (1944) - Micheline Tessier
- La femme fatale (1946) - Claire Coussol
- The Marriage of Ramuntcho (1947) - Maritchu
- Captain Blomet (1947) - Micheline de Mandane
- Métier de fous (1948) - Sylvia Dormont
- Fantasmi del mare (1948) - Elena
- Mission in Tangier (1949) - Lily
- Amour et compagnie (1950) - Danielle Lecourtoy
- Women Are Crazy (1950) - Marguerite
- The Straw Lover (1951) - Gisèle Sarrazin de Fontenoy
- Avalanche (1951) - Wanda Bouchard
- Huis clos (1954) - Estelle Rigault- une infanticide
- Bad Liaisons (1955) - Hélène Ducouret
- It's All Adam's Fault (1958) - Hélène de Bergen
- La bête à l'affût (1959) - Gilberte
- Méfiez-vous, mesdames (1963) - Florence Moulin
- Beau Masque (1972) - Emilie
- Pardon Mon Affaire, Too! (1977) - Marie-Christine Bosquet, Daniel's director

== Bibliography ==
- Goble, Alan. The Complete Index to Literary Sources in Film. Walter de Gruyter, 1999.
