= One Life (1958 film) =

- Directed by: Alexandre Astruc
- Screenplay by: Alexandre Astruc; Roland Laudenbach
- Based on: Une Vie by Guy de Maupassant
- Produced by: Annie Dorfmann
- Cinematography: Claude Renoir
- Edited by: Claudine Bouché
- Music by: Roman Vlad
- Release date: 24 September 1958
- Running time: 86 minutes
- Country: France
- Language: French

One Life (French: Une vie) is a 1958 French drama film directed by Alexandre Astruc, starring Maria Schell and Christian Marquand. It is also known as End of Desire in the United States. It is set in the 19th century and tells the story of the unhappy marriage between an idealistic woman of aristocratic background and a cynical man. The film is based on the novel Une Vie by Guy de Maupassant. It was shown in competition at the 19th Venice International Film Festival. It had 2,315,098 admissions in France.

The song "Une Vie", written by Roman Vlad and Marc Lanjean, was released as a single by Maria Schell in 1958, and covered by Eddie Barclay's big band in 1959.

== Cast ==
- Maria Schell as Jeanne Dandieu
- Christian Marquand as Julien de Lamare
- Ivan Desny as De Fourcheville
- Pascale Petit as Rosalie
- Antonella Lualdi as Gilberte de Fourcheville
- Louis Arbessier as M. Dandieu
- Marie-Hélène Dasté as Mme. Dandieu
- Michel de Slubicki as Paul de Lamare
- Andrée Tainsy as Ludivine

== See also ==
- One Life (2016 film), directed by Stéphane Brizé, also based on the Maupassant novel
