= Jean-Michel Frodon =

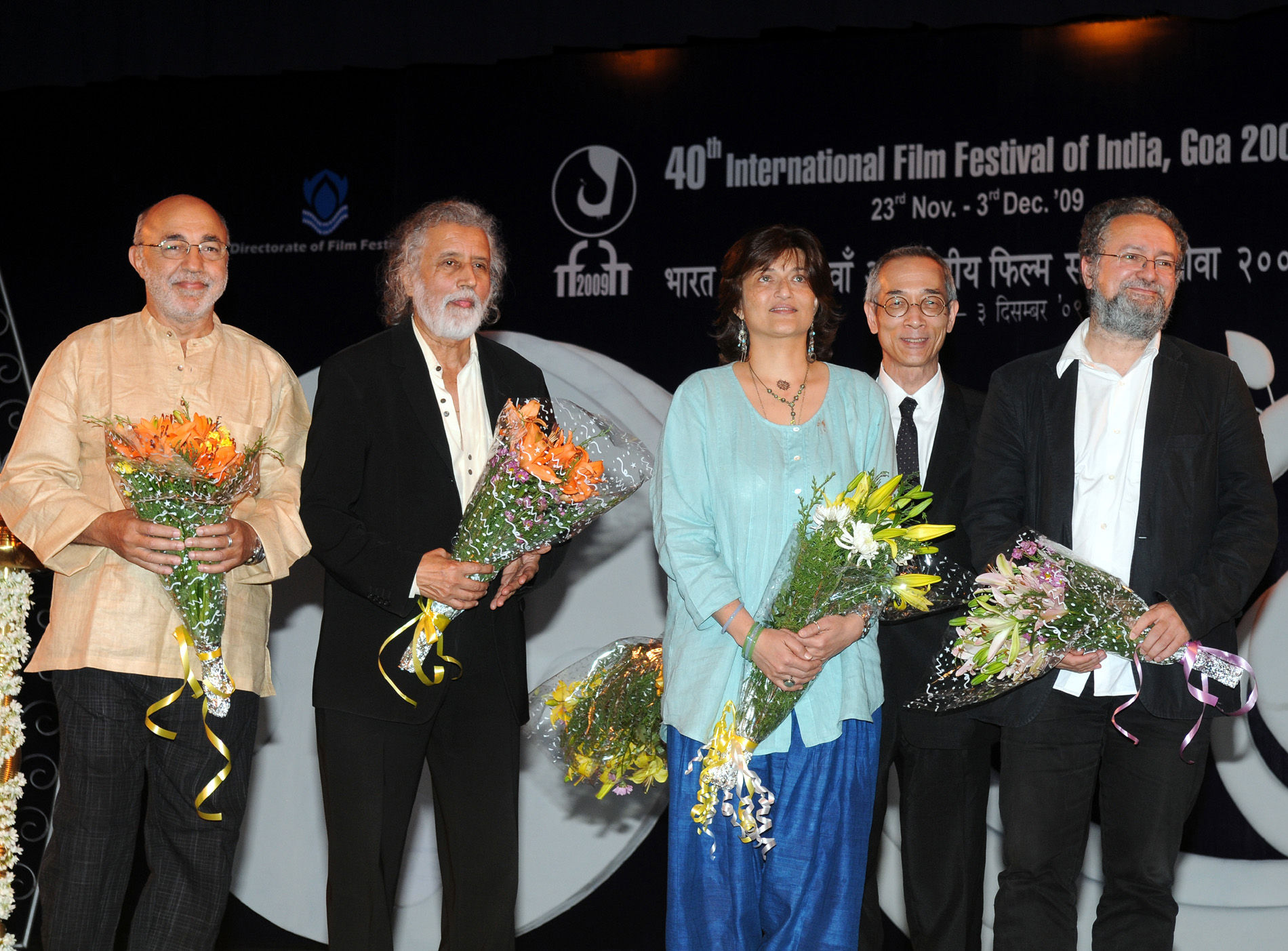
- Jean-Michel Frodon, IFFI (2009)
- Born: Jean-Michel Billard; September 20, 1953 (age 72); Paris, France
- Occupations: Journalist, critic, historian of cinema

Jean-Michel Frodon (born 20 September 1953 in Paris) is a journalist, critic and historian of cinema.

== Biography ==
Born Jean-Michel Billard, he writes with a pseudonym borrowed from Frodo of The Lord of the Rings. He has a master's degree and a DEA in history. He worked as an educator from 1971 to 1981. Next, he was a photographer from 1981 to 1985. In 1983, he became a journalist and film critic for the weekly periodical Le Point, of which his father, Pierre Billard, also a journalist and a film critic, was one of the founders and chief editors. He held this post until 1990.

He took over the same functions at the daily newspaper Le Monde in 1990 and in 1995, he became responsible for the daily film column. In 2003 he became head editor of Cahiers du cinémas four years after its purchase by Le Monde. After leaving in 2009, he writes the blog Projection publique on website slate.fr.

He has written, at times, for numerous other journals of cinema. In 2001 he founded L'Exception, the think tank about cinema. He has taught at Pantheon-Sorbonne University and École Normale Supérieure, and currently teaches at Sciences Po Paris.

== Publications ==
- "Jean de florette: la folle aventure d'un film", co-written with Jean-Claude Loiseau (editions Herscher, 1987)
- «Les enquêteurs du regard,» Le Monde, 27 janvier 1994. (in French)
- l'Âge moderne du cinéma français (Flammarion, 1995)
- La Projection nationale (Éditions Odile Jacob, 1998)
- Hou Hsiao-hsien (dir., Les Cahiers du cinéma, 1999, augmented edition en 2005)
- Conversation avec Woody Allen (Plon, 2000)
- Print the Legend, Cinéma et journalisme (co-dir., Cahiers du cinéma, 2004)
- Au sud du cinéma (dir., Cahiers du cinéma, 2004)
- Horizon cinéma (Cahiers du cinéma, coll XXIe siècle, 2006)
- Le Cinéma chinois (Cahiers du cinéma CNDP, coll Les Petits Cahiers, 2006)
- Gilles Deleuze et les images (co-dir. avec François Dosse, Les Cahiers du cinéma, coll. Essais, 2008)
- Robert Bresson (Les Cahiers du cinéma, coll. Grands cinéaste. 2008)
- La critique de cinéma (Les Cahiers du cinéma CNDP, coll Les Petits Cahiers, 2008)
- Genèses (avec Amos Gitai et Marie-José Sanselme, Gallimard, 2009)
- Cinema and the Shoah: An Art Confronts the Tragedy of the Twentieth Century. Albany, NY: SUNY Press. 2010. ISBN 978-1438430263.

Media offices
Preceded by Charles Tesson; Jean-Marc Lalanne	Editor of Cahiers du cinéma 2003–2009; With: Emmanuel Burdeau	Succeeded by Stéphane Delorme
