= Jean Tourane =

Jean Tourane (1919–1986) was a French filmmaker known for his footage of small animals. His birth name was Jean Briel. Among others he filmed a television series about a small duck named "Saturnin" during the 1960s. In the 1990s, clips from this series were merged into a new series called The Adventures of Dynamo Duck, which aired on Fox Kids in the United States.

Tourane started his professional career as a painter and photographer of small animals, and moved from photography into film. After making a number of shorts, he made the first full-length Saturnin movie, and was in 1964 awarded a contract for 78 television episodes with French television.

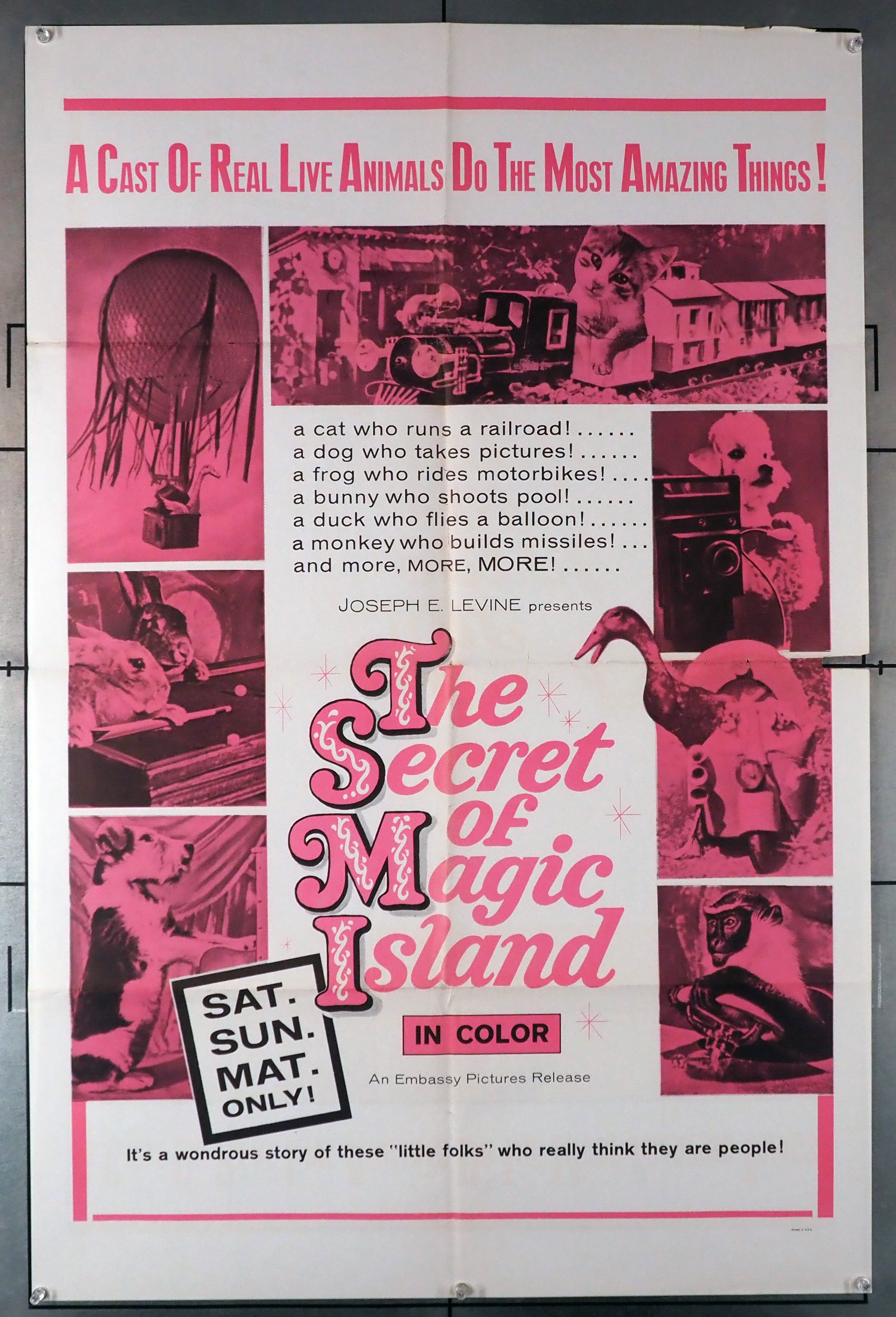
U.S. one-sheet poster for Jean Tourane film "The Secret of Magic Island (release in the U.S. in 1964)

He was also for a time the mayor of the commune of Le Val-Saint-Germain in Essonne department, France.

== Filmography as director ==
- Saturnin Et La Fee Pas Comme Les Autres (1955)
- The Secret of Magic Island (Une Fee Pas Comme Les Autres) a.k.a. Secret of Outer Space Island (1956)
- Saturnin, le petit canard (1964)
