= La Proie pour l'ombre =

- Theatrical release poster
- Directed by: Alexandre Astruc
- Written by: Alexandre Astruc; Claude Brulé; Françoise Sagan
- Produced by: Edmond Ténoudji
- Cinematography: Marcel Grignon
- Edited by: Ghislaine Desjonquères; Denise de Casabianca
- Music by: Richard Cornu; Jean-Sébastien Bach
- Production companies: Les Films Marceau; Cocinor
- Distributed by: Marceau-Cocinor
- Release date: 14 April 1961
- Running time: 95 minutes
- Country: France
- Language: French

La Proie pour l'ombre is a 1961 French drama film directed by Alexandre Astruc, starring Annie Girardot, Daniel Gélin and Christian Marquand. It is known in English as Shadow of Adultery. The original screenplay was written by Astruc, Claude Brulé and Françoise Sagan. The film was released on 14 April 1961. It had 620,504 admissions in France.

== Plot ==
The movie centers on the story of a woman who runs an art gallery and leaves her husband for another man, whom she eventually also becomes dependent on and leaves; the title is from the French expression lâcher la proie pour l’ombre, which literally means “to let go of the prey for the shadow”, referring to Aesop's fable The Dog and Its Reflection.

== Cast ==
- Annie Girardot as Anna Kraemmer
- Christian Marquand as Bruno
- Daniel Gélin as Eric Kraemmer
- Michèle Girardon as Anita
- Michèle Gerbier as Claudine
- Anne Caprile as Luce
- Christiane Barry as Madame Interlenghi
- Corrado Guarducci as Edoardo Interlengh

== Themes ==
Alexandre Astruc described the main character as "a woman who feels in herself a very real need for freedom that is as much moral as social so that she sets about matching a man's work; but at the same time, because she is a woman, she feels the need to be passive, dominated, submissive."

== Production ==
The film was produced by Les Films Marceau in collaboration with Cocinor - Comptoir Cinématographique du Nord. It was shot from 20 July to 31 August 1960.
