= The Crimson Curtain (1953 film) =

1952 film

- Directed by: Alexandre Astruc
- Written by: Alexandre Astruc; Jules Amédée Barbey d'Aurevilly
- Produced by: Sacha Kamenka
- Starring: Anouk Aimée
- Narrated by: Yves Furet
- Cinematography: Eugen Schüfftan
- Edited by: Jean Mitry
- Music by: Jean-Jacques Grunenwald
- Distributed by: L'Alliance Générale de Distribution Cinématographique
- Release date: 6 March 1953
- Running time: 44 minutes
- Country: France
- Language: French

The Crimson Curtain (French: Le Rideau cramoisi) is a 1953 French short film directed by Alexandre Astruc. It was screened at the 1952 Cannes Film Festival, but not entered into the competition.

== Plot ==
A young military officer is a tenant in the house of wealthy citizens. He admires their daughter, who eventually makes his dreams come true by spending the night with him. They have a secret love affair. But as surprisingly as she indulged him, she dies in his arms. Desperate, the officer rides away.

== Cast ==
- Anouk Aimée as Albertine
- Marguerite Garcya as Albertine's mother
- Jim Gérald as Albertine's father
- Jean-Claude Pascal as the officer
