= Fern Buchner =

American make-up artist

- Born: March 22, 1929
- Died: September 23, 2016 (aged 87); Henderson, Nevada
- Occupation: Makeup artist
- Years active: 1971-1998

Fern Buchner (March 22, 1929 - September 23, 2016) was an American make-up artist and a frequent collaborator of director Woody Allen, with whom she worked on nearly two dozen films, including Annie Hall, Manhattan, and Hannah and Her Sisters. In addition to Allen, Buchner worked with many other notable directors during her career, including Bob Fosse (All That Jazz), Warren Beatty (Reds), Alan Alda (Sweet Liberty), and John Huston (The Dead). She was also known for her work on films such as Wall Street (1987), Addams Family Values (1993), and The Last Days of Disco (1998).

== Career ==
=== Early career ===
Early in her career, Buchner worked for CBS, where she did makeup for Mike Wallace ahead of his appearances on the morning news. She later worked on the soap operas Guiding Light and Central Park West.

Buchner's first job as a makeup artist for a film was on the 1971 Mario Monicelli comedy Lady Liberty, starring Sophia Loren.

=== Collaboration with Woody Allen ===
Buchner's first collaboration with Woody Allen was on the 1997 film Annie Hall. Buchner worked on nearly two dozen of Allen's films, including Interiors, Manhattan, Stardust Memories, A Midsummer Night's Sex Comedy, Broadway Danny Rose, Crimes and Misdemeanors, Husbands and Wives, and Manhattan Murder Mystery, among others. Everyone Says I Love You (1996) marked the final collaboration between Buchner and Allen.

=== Filmography ===
- Lady Liberty (1971)
- A Place Called Today (1972)
- The Effect of Gamma Rays on Man-in-the-Moon Marigolds (1972)
- Summer Wishes, Winter Dreams (1973, as Fern Buckner)
- All the President's Men (1976)
- Annie Hall (1977)
- Interiors (1978)
- Oliver's Story (1978)
- Manhattan (1979)
- All That Jazz (1979)
- Stardust Memories (1980)
- Nighthawks (1981)
- Reds (1981)
- Soup for One (as Ferne Buchner, 1982)
- A Midsummer Night's Sex Comedy (1982)
- Lovesick (1983)
- Zelig (1983)
- Broadway Danny Rose (1984)
- The Muppets Take Manhattan (1984)
- Firstborn (1984)
- The Purple Rose of Cairo (1985)
- Hannah and Her Sisters (1986)
- Sweet Liberty (1986)
- Critical Condition (1987)
- Radio Days (1987)
- The Secret of My Success (1987)
- The Dead (1987)
- Wall Street (1987)
- September (1987)
- Mr. North (1988, as Fern Buckner)
- Another Woman (1988)
- Cousins (1989)
- New York Stories (1989)
- See You in the Morning (1989)
- Parenthood (1989)
- Crimes and Misdemeanors (1989)
- Presumed Innocent (1990)
- Edward Scissorhands (1990, as Fern Buckner)
- Alice (1990)
- Scenes from a Mall (1991)
- The Addams Family (1991)
- Fried Green Tomatoes (1991)
- Single White Female (1992)
- Husbands and Wives (1992)
- Consenting Adults (1992)
- Manhattan Murder Mystery (1993)
- Addams Family Values (1993)
- The Paper (1994)
- The War (1994)
- Boys on the Side (1995)
- Mad Love (1995)
- Up Close & Personal (1996)
- Mighty Aphrodite (1996)
- Everyone Says I Love You (1996)
- Picture Perfect (1997)
- Red Corner (1997)
- In the Gloaming (1997)
- The Last Days of Disco (1998)
- Snake Eyes (1998)

=== Awards and nominations ===
Buchner earned BAFTA Award nominations for her work on Zelig (1983), The Addams Family (1991), and Addams Family Values (1993).

== Personal life ==
Buchner had three sons and a long-term partner, Dave Miller.

Buchner died in Henderson, Nevada on September 23, 2016, at the age of 87.
