= Alexandre Astruc =

French film critic and film director

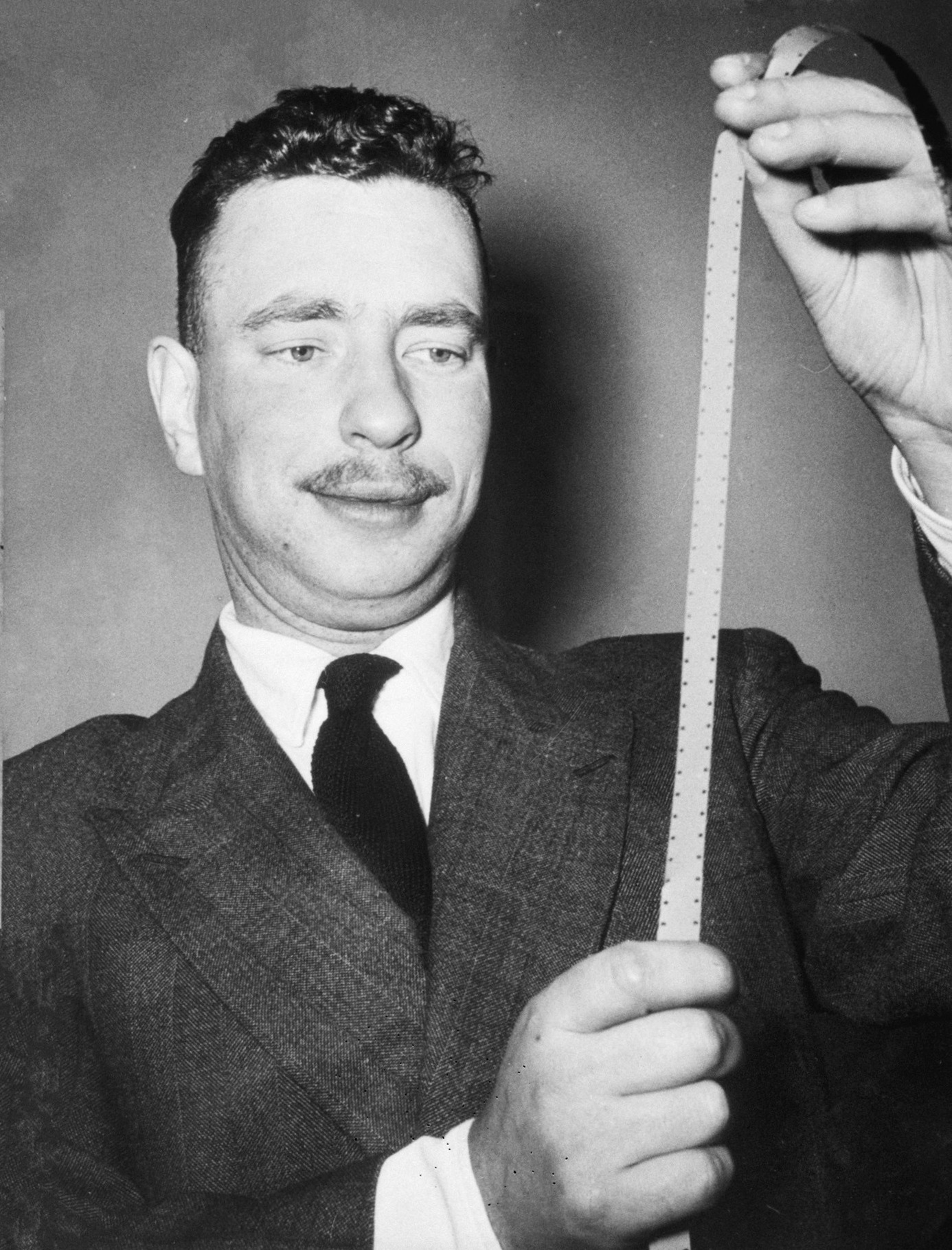
- Alexandre Astruc, c. 1965
- Born: 13 July 1923
- Died: 19 May 2016 (aged 92)
- Writing career
- Genres: film director journalist, novelist
- Notable awards: René Clair Award

Alexandre Astruc (13 July 1923 – 19 May 2016) was a French film director, film critic, screenwriter, and novelist. He is best known for his landmark 1948 essay "Naissance d'une nouvelle avant-garde: la caméra-stylo" ("The Birth of a New Avant-Garde: The Camera-Pen"), which argued that cinema should become a means of personal expression as flexible and subtle as written language. The concept became a foundational influence on the theorists and filmmakers of the French New Wave. Alongside his extensive critical and literary work, Astruc directed a series of highly literate feature films between 1955 and 1968 before working extensively in television.

== Biography ==
=== Early life and writing ===
Astruc was born on 13 July 1923 in the 16th arrondissement of Paris. His parents were both journalists. He completed degrees in law and arts. After the Liberation of Paris in 1944, he became a figure of the Saint-Germain-des-Prés intellectual scene and a close associate of Jean-Paul Sartre, Boris Vian, Simone de Beauvoir, and Albert Camus. He published his first novel, Les Vacances, with Gallimard in 1945, and worked as a literary and film critic for Combat, L'Écran français, and other publications.

In March 1948, Astruc published "Naissance d'une nouvelle avant-garde: la caméra-stylo" in L'Écran français. The essay argued that cinema was outgrowing its role as spectacle or filmed theatre and becoming a language in its own right, one through which a filmmaker could express thoughts, philosophy, and abstract ideas as directly as a novelist could with prose. The concept of the caméra-stylo became foundational to subsequent theorising about the director as author, and was a direct precursor to the politique des auteurs developed by the Cahiers du cinéma critics in the 1950s, though it remained a distinct idea concerned with personal cinematic expression rather than the reappraisal of directors working within the studio system.

In the same period, Astruc co-founded the film society Objectif 49 with André Bazin, under the honorary presidency of Jean Cocteau. Objectif 49 organised the Festival du Film Maudit in Biarritz in 1949, which brought together many of the young cinéphiles who would form the New Wave. He also contributed to La Gazette du cinéma, the short-lived journal edited by Éric Rohmer that gave Jean-Luc Godard and Jacques Rivette their first published criticism, and to Cahiers du Cinéma from 1951.

=== Career ===
Astruc worked as an assistant director to Marc Allégret and Marcel Achard in 1946–1947 before attempting to put his theoretical ideas into practice. His second short film was Ulysse ou les Mauvaises Rencontres (1949), a burlesque parody of Homer's Odyssey shot at the Théâtre du Vieux-Colombier. Co-written with Jean Cau and Anne-Marie Cazalis, the film featured an array of prominent Saint-Germain-des-Prés intellectual and artistic figures in its cast, including Jean Cocteau as Homer, Jean Genet as the Cyclops, Boris Vian as a Lotus-eater, and Christian Bérard as Neptune. Though the film is now considered lost and left little material footprint, it marked his initial transition from critic to filmmaker.

His first major breakthrough as a director came with Le Rideau cramoisi (1952), a 44-minute adaptation of a story by Jules Barbey d'Aurevilly starring Anouk Aimée. The film contained no spoken dialogue, relying instead on voice-over narration and the cinematography of Eugen Schüfftan to tell the story of a doomed love affair. It won the Prix Louis-Delluc.

His debut feature, Les Mauvaises Rencontres (1955), used layered flashbacks to chronicle a young woman's navigation of post-war Parisian society. The film won the award for Most Promising New Director at the 16th Venice International Film Festival. Une Vie (1958), an adaptation of Guy de Maupassant photographed by Claude Renoir, drew praise from Godard in Cahiers du Cinema for its rigour and simplicity. La Proie pour l'ombre (1961), starring Annie Girardot, explored female autonomy and marital power in a contemporary setting. His final theatrical features were L'Éducation sentimentale (1962), after Gustave Flaubert, and two war films, La Longue Marche (1966) and Flammes sur l'Adriatique (1968). In 1994, the Académie française awarded him the René Clair Award for his lifetime body of cinematic work.

Although the New Wave filmmakers acknowledged Astruc as a pioneer, his commitment to literary adaptation and formal elegance increasingly placed him at a distance from the movement's rawer, more improvisatory direction after 1959. From the late 1960s, he worked in television, directing adaptations of Edgar Allan Poe, Honoré de Balzac, and others, as well as the three-hour documentary Sartre par lui-même (1976), an extended filmed interview with his old friend Sartre and Beauvoir.

Astruc continued to publish novels and memoirs throughout his life, including La Tête la première (1975), Le Serpent jaune (1977), Le Roman de Descartes (1989), and Le Montreur d'ombres (1996). He was appointed Commandeur of the Ordre des Arts et des Lettres.

He died on 19 May 2016 in the 16th arrondissement of Paris, aged 92.

== Filmography ==
=== Cinema ===
Year	Title	English title	Notes
1948	Aller et retour		short film
1949	Ulysse ou les Mauvaises Rencontres		short film
1952	Le Rideau cramoisi	The Crimson Curtain	medium-length film; Prix Louis-Delluc
1955	Les Mauvaises Rencontres	Bad Liaisons	Most Promising New Director, Venice
1958	Une Vie	End of Desire	
1961	La Proie pour l'ombre	Shadow of Adultery	
1962	L'Éducation sentimentale		after Gustave Flaubert
1965	Évariste Galois		short film
1966	La Longue Marche		
1968	Flammes sur l'Adriatique		
1976	Sartre par lui-même	Sartre by Himself	documentary; co-directed with Michel Contat

=== Television (selected) ===
Year	Title	Notes
1963	Le Puits et le pendule	after Edgar Allan Poe
1978	Louis XI ou la naissance d'un roi	
1980	Arsène Lupin joue et perd	mini-series
1981	La Chute de la maison Usher	after Edgar Allan Poe
1989	Une fille d'Ève	after Honoré de Balzac
1993	Albert Savarus	after Honoré de Balzac

== Selected publications ==
- Les Vacances (1945)
- La Tête la première (1975)
- Ciel de cendres (1975)
- Le Serpent jaune (1977)
- Quand la chouette s'envole (1979)
- Le Permissionnaire (1982)
- Le Roman de Descartes (1989)
- Du stylo à la caméra et de la caméra au stylo: Écrits 1942–1984 (1992)
- Le Montreur d'ombres (1996)
- Le Plaisir en toutes choses (interviews with Noël Simsolo, 2015)
