= James Stewart =

American actor and military officer (1908–1997)

Jimmy Stewart
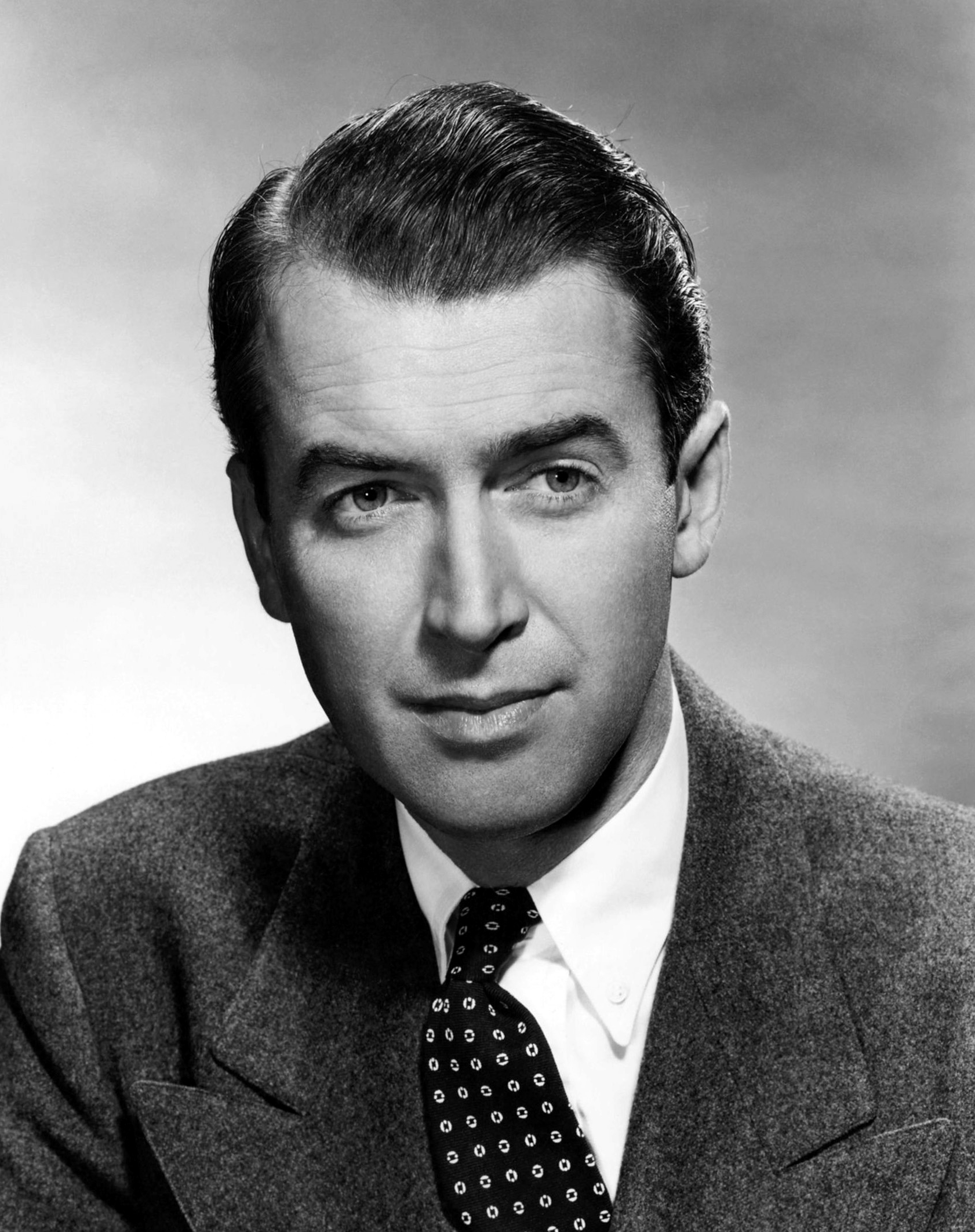
- Stewart in 1948
- Born: James Maitland Stewart; May 20, 1908; Indiana, Pennsylvania, U.S.
- Died: July 2, 1997 (aged 89); Beverly Hills, California, U.S.
- Other name: Jimmy Stewart
- Education: Princeton University (AB)
- Occupations: Actor; military officer
- Years active: 1932–1991
- Works: Filmography
- Spouse: Gloria Hatrick McLean (m. 1949; died 1994)
- Children: 4
- Awards: Full list
- Military career
- Branch: United States Army; Army Air Forces; United States Air Force
- Service years: 1941–1947 (Army); 1947–1968 (Air Force)
- Rank: Brigadier General
- Units: 2nd Bombardment Wing; Air Force Reserve
- Commands: 703d Bombardment Squadron
- Conflicts: World War II; European Theater of Operations; Second Schweinfurt raid; Vietnam War

James Maitland Stewart (May 20, 1908 – July 2, 1997) was an American actor and military aviator. Known for his distinctive drawl and everyman screen persona, Stewart appeared in 80 films from 1935 to 1991. His films are considered among the greatest of all time. In 1999, the American Film Institute (AFI) ranked him third on its list of the greatest American male actors; he received numerous honors including the AFI Life Achievement Award in 1980, the Kennedy Center Honor in 1983, as well as the Academy Honorary Award and Presidential Medal of Freedom, both in 1985.

Born and raised in the city of Indiana, Pennsylvania, Stewart started acting while at Princeton University. After graduating, he began a career as a stage actor, making his Broadway debut in 1932 in the play Carry Nation. He landed his first supporting role in The Murder Man (1935) and had his breakthrough in Frank Capra's ensemble comedy You Can't Take It with You (1938). He later starred in Capra's political comedy Mr. Smith Goes to Washington (1939), and Ernst Lubitsch's romantic comedy The Shop Around the Corner (1940), Stewart went on to receive the Academy Award for Best Actor for his performance in the George Cukor romantic comedy The Philadelphia Story (1940). After returning home from World War II, he went on to star in Capra's It's a Wonderful Life (1946), which was a critical and commercial disappointment upon its release, but has since become a beloved classic after its copyright expired in the early 1970s.

Stewart went on to star in four films directed by Alfred Hitchcock, Rope (1948), Rear Window (1954), The Man Who Knew Too Much (1956), and Vertigo (1958), as well as Anatomy of a Murder (1959), and The Man Who Shot Liberty Valance (1962).

With his private pilot's skills, he enlisted in the US Army Air Forces during the war, seeking combat duty and rose to be deputy commanding officer of the 2nd Bombardment Wing and commanding the 703d Bombardment Squadron from 1941 to 1947. He later transferred to the Air Force Reserve, and held various command positions until his retirement in 1968 as a brigadier general.

== Early life and education ==
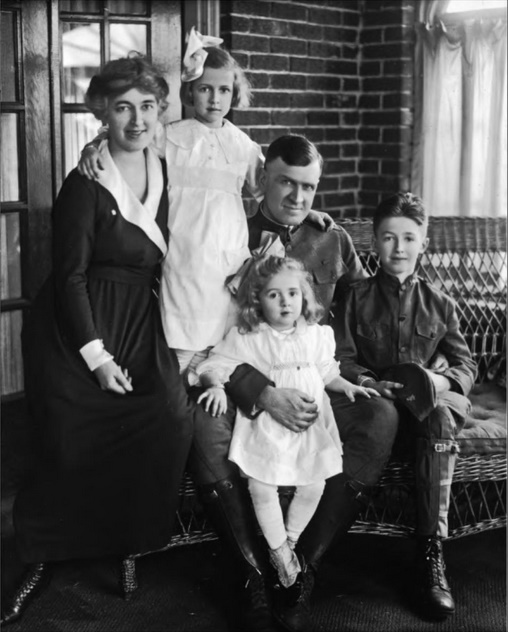
The Stewart family in 1918

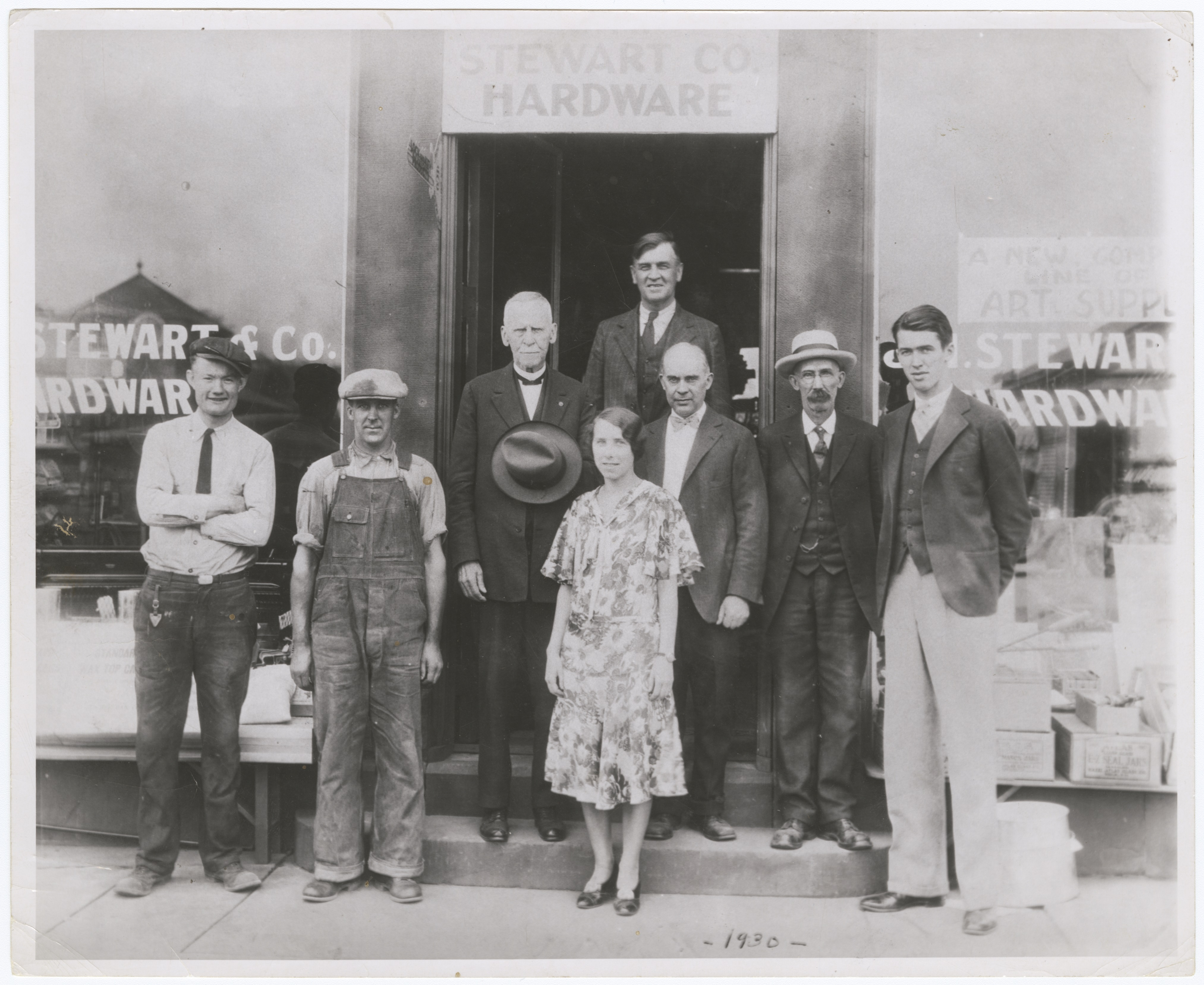
Stewart (right) outside his family's hardware store, 1930

James Maitland Stewart was born on May 20, 1908, in Indiana, Pennsylvania, the eldest child and only son born to Elizabeth Ruth (née Jackson; 1875–1953) and Alexander Maitland Stewart (1872–1961). Stewart had two younger sisters, Mary (1912–1977) and Virginia (1914–1972). He was of Scottish and Ulster-Scots ancestry. The Stewart family had lived in Pennsylvania for many generations. Stewart's father ran the family business, the J. M. Stewart and Company Hardware Store, which he hoped Stewart would take over as an adult after attending Princeton University, as was the family tradition. Raised a Presbyterian by his deeply religious father, Stewart was a devout churchgoer for much of his life.

Stewart's mother was a pianist, and music was an important part of family life. When a customer at the store was unable to pay his bill, Stewart's father accepted an old accordion as payment. Stewart learned to play the instrument with the help of a local barber. His accordion became a fixture offstage during his acting career. A shy child, Stewart spent much of his time after school in the basement working on model airplanes, mechanical drawings, and chemistry—all with a dream of going into aviation. He attended the Wilson Model School for primary school and junior high school. He was not a gifted student and received average to low grades. According to his teachers, this was not from a lack of intelligence, but due to being creative and having a tendency to daydream.

In the fall of 1923, Stewart began attending Mercersburg Academy prep school because his father did not believe he would be accepted into Princeton (his father was a member of the class of 1898) if he attended public high school. At Mercersburg, Stewart participated in a variety of extracurricular activities. He was a member of the track team (competing as a high jumper under coach Jimmy Curran), the art editor of the school yearbook, a member of the glee club, and a member of the John Marshall Literary Society. To his disappointment, he was relegated to the third-tier football team due to his slender physique.

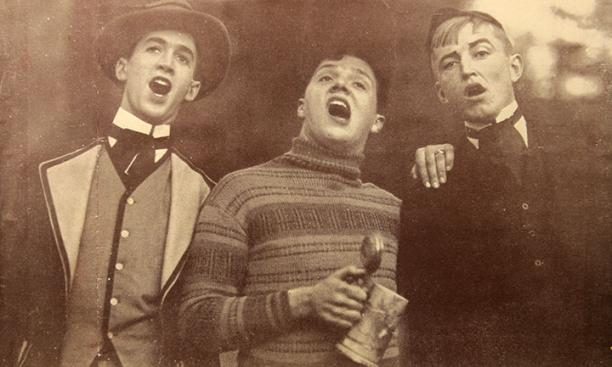
Stewart (left), Joshua Logan (center) and Marshall Dana rehearse for their "Drinking Song" number at the Triangle Club, 1930

Stewart made his first onstage appearance at Mercersburg, as Buquet in the play The Wolves in 1928. During summer breaks, he returned to Indiana, working first as a brick loader and then as a magician's assistant. Due to scarlet fever that turned into a kidney infection, he had to take time out from school in 1927, which delayed his graduation until 1928. He remained passionate about aviation, with his interest enhanced by Charles Lindbergh's first solo transatlantic flight, but abandoned visions of becoming a pilot when his father steered him towards Princeton.

Stewart enrolled at Princeton in 1928 as a member of the class of 1932, majoring in architecture and becoming a member of the Princeton Charter Club. He excelled academically but also became attracted to the school's drama and music clubs, including the Princeton Triangle Club. Upon his graduation in 1932, he was awarded a scholarship for graduate studies in architecture for his thesis on an airport terminal design, but chose instead to join University Players, an intercollegiate summer stock company performing in West Falmouth, Massachusetts, on Cape Cod.

== Career ==
=== 1932–1937: Theater and early film roles ===
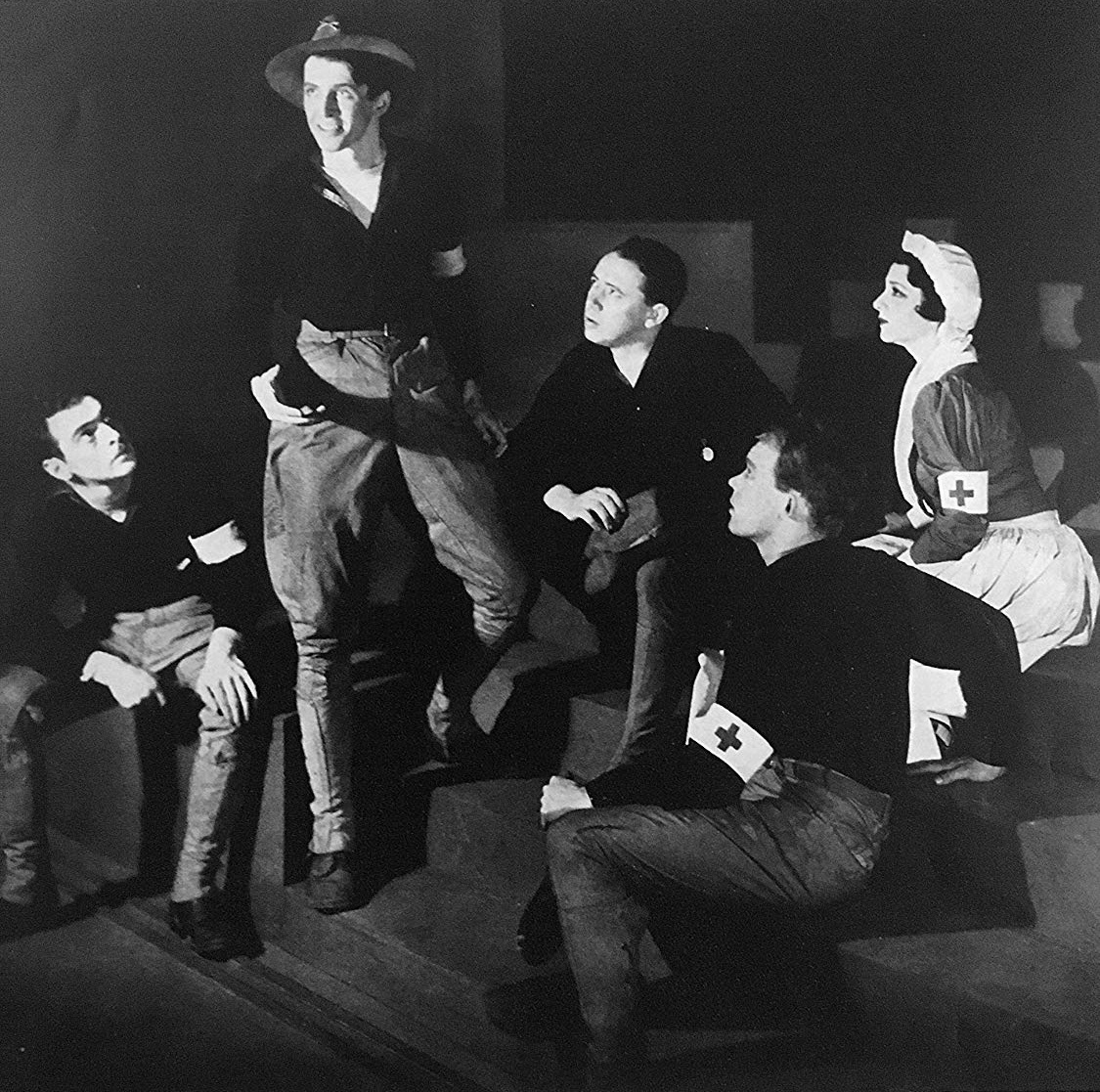
Stewart in Yellow Jack, in which he starred on Broadway in 1934 and which garnered him critical praise.

Stewart performed in bit parts in the University Players' productions in Cape Cod during the summer of 1932. The company's directors included Joshua Logan, Bretaigne Windust, and Charles Leatherbee, and amongst its other actors were married couple Henry Fonda and Margaret Sullavan, who became Stewart's close friends. At the end of the season, Stewart moved to New York with his Players friends Logan, Myron McCormick, and newly single Henry Fonda.

Along with McCormick, Stewart debuted on Broadway in the brief run of Carry Nation and a few weeks later – again with McCormick – appeared as a chauffeur in the comedy Goodbye Again, in which he had a walk-on line. The New Yorker commented, "Mr. James Stewart's chauffeur... comes on for three minutes and walks off to a round of spontaneous applause." Following the seven-month run of Goodbye Again, Stewart took a stage manager position in Boston, but was fired after frequently missing his cues.

Returning to New York, he then landed a small part in Spring in Autumn and a role in All Good Americans, where he was required to throw a banjo out of the window. Brooks Atkinson of The New York Times wrote, "Throwing a $250 banjo out of the window at the concierge is constructive abuse and should be virtuously applauded." Both plays folded after only short runs, and Stewart began to think about going back to his studies.

Stewart was convinced to continue acting when he was cast in the lead role of Yellow Jack, playing a soldier who becomes the subject of a yellow fever experiment. It premiered at the Martin Beck Theater in March 1934. Stewart received unanimous praise from the critics, but the play proved unpopular with audiences and folded by June. During the summer, Stewart made his film debut with an unbilled appearance in the Shemp Howard comedy short Art Trouble (1934), filmed in Brooklyn, and acted in summer stock productions of We Die Exquisitely and All Paris Knows at the Red Barn Theater on Long Island. In the fall, he again received excellent reviews for his role in Divided by Three at the Ethel Barrymore Theatre, which he followed with the modestly successful Page Miss Glory and the critical failure A Journey by Night in spring 1935.

Soon after A Journey by Night ended, Stewart signed a seven-year contract with Metro-Goldwyn-Mayer (MGM), orchestrated by talent scout Bill Grady, who had been tracking Stewart's career since seeing him perform in Princeton. His first Hollywood role was a minor appearance in the Spencer Tracy vehicle The Murder Man (1935). His performance was largely ignored by critics, although the New York Herald Tribune, remembering him in Yellow Jack, called him "wasted in a bit that he handles with characteristically engaging skill". MGM did not see leading-man material in Stewart, described by biographer Michael D. Rinella as a "lanky young bumpkin with a hesitant manner of speech". During this time, his agent Leland Hayward decided that the best path for him would be through loan-outs to other studios.

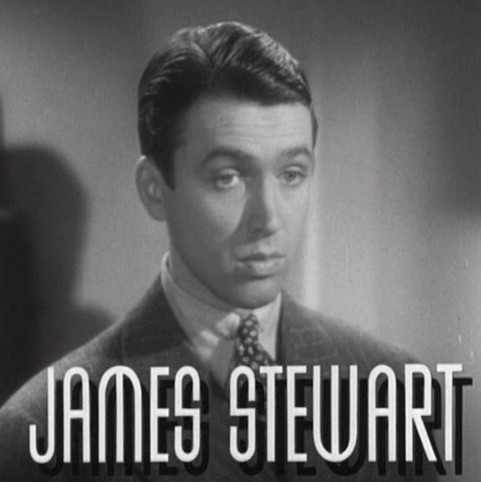
After the Thin Man (1936)

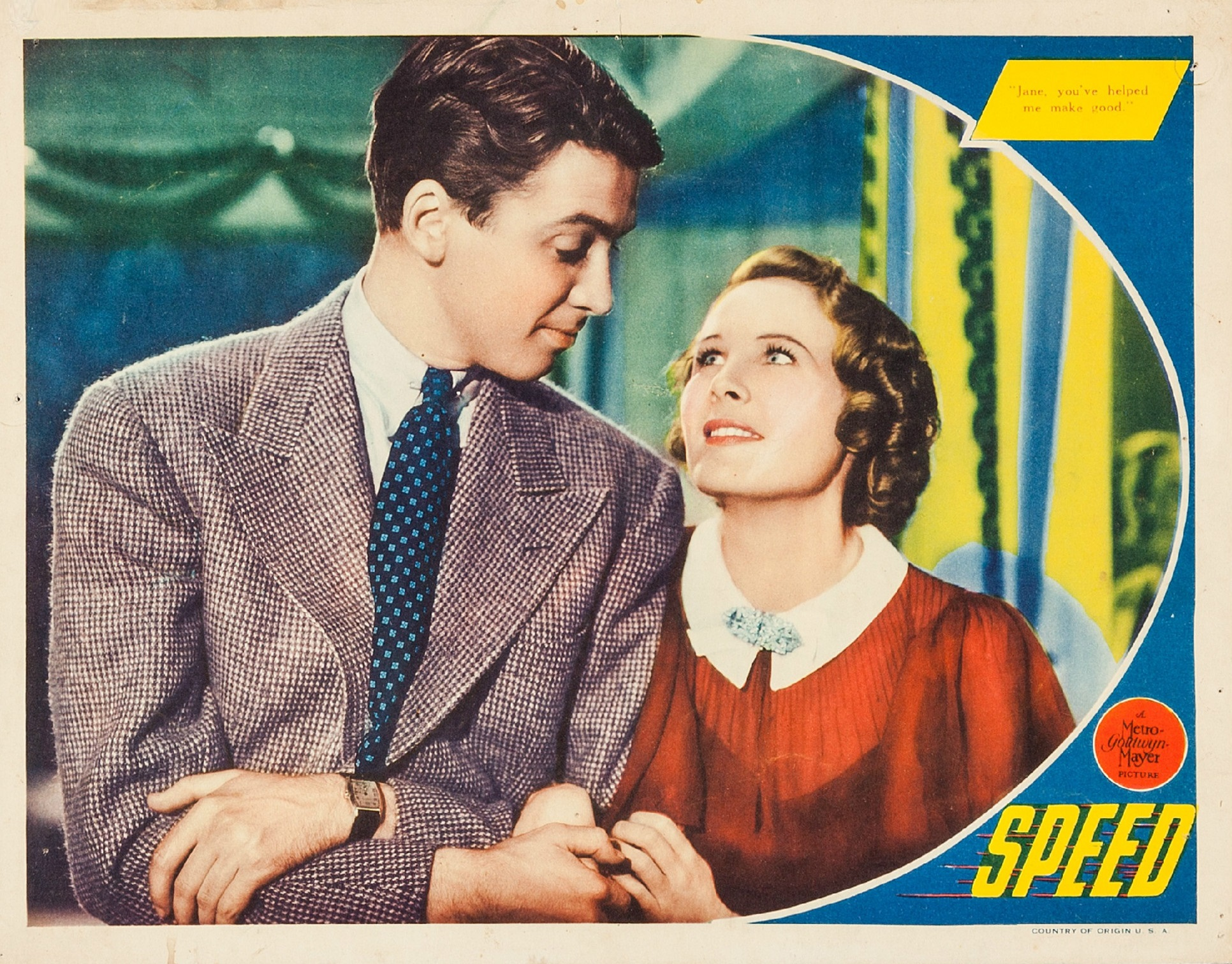
Stewart and Wendy Barrie in Speed (1936)

Stewart had only a small role in his second MGM film, the hit musical Rose Marie (1936), but it led to his casting in seven other films within one year, including Next Time We Love and After the Thin Man. He also received crucial help from his University Players friend Margaret Sullavan, who campaigned for him to be her leading man in Next Time We Love, a Universal romantic comedy filmed right after Rose Marie. Sullavan rehearsed extensively with him, boosting his confidence and helping him incorporate his mannerisms and boyishness into his screen persona. Next Time We Love was a box-office success and received mostly positive reviews, leading Stewart to be noticed by critics and MGM executives. Time stated that "the chief significance of [the film] in the progress of the cinema industry is likely to reside in the presence in its cast of James Stewart", and The New York Times called him "a welcome addition to the roster of Hollywood's leading men".

Stewart followed Next Time We Love with supporting roles in two commercially successful romantic comedies, Wife vs. Secretary (1936) with Clark Gable and Myrna Loy and Small Town Girl (1936). In both, he played the betrayed boyfriend of the leading lady, portrayed by Jean Harlow and Janet Gaynor, respectively. Both films garnered him some good reviews. After an appearance in the short subject Important News (1936), Stewart had his first top-billed role in the low-budget "B" movie Speed (1936), in which he played a mechanic and speed driver competing in the Indianapolis 500. The film was a critical and commercial failure, although Frank Nugent of The New York Times stated that "Mr. Stewart [and the rest of the cast] perform as pleasantly as possible."

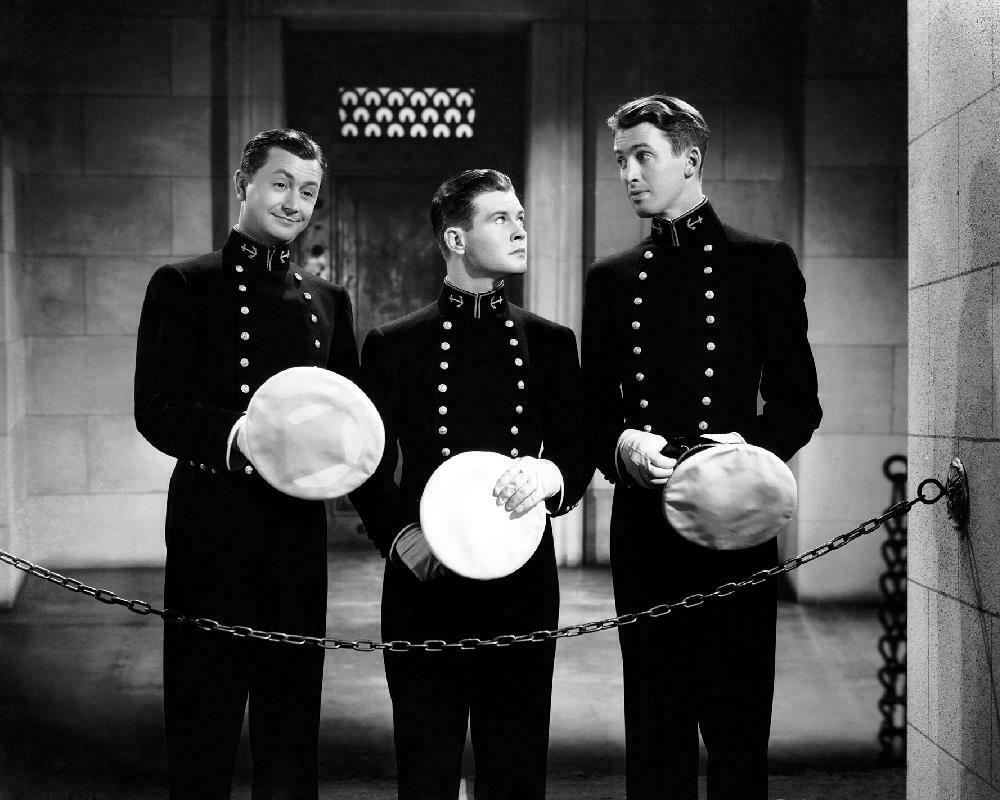
Robert Young, Tom Brown, and Stewart in Navy Blue and Gold (1937)

Stewart's last three film releases of 1936 were all box-office successes. He had only a bit part in The Gorgeous Hussy, but a starring role in the musical Born to Dance with Eleanor Powell. His performance in the latter was not well-received: The New York Times stated that his "singing and dancing will (fortunately) never win him a song-and-dance-man classification", and Variety called "his singing and dancing [...] rather painful on their own", although it otherwise found Stewart aptly cast in an "assignment [that] calls for a shy youth". Stewart's last film to be released in 1936, After the Thin Man, features a shattering emotional climax rendered by Stewart. Kate Cameron of the New York Daily News wrote that he "has one grand scene in which he demonstrates most effectively that he is something more than a musical comedy juvenile".

For his next film, the romantic drama Seventh Heaven (1937), Stewart was loaned to 20th Century-Fox to play a Parisian sewer worker in a remake of Frank Borzage's silent classic released a decade earlier. He and co-star Simone Simon were miscast, and the film was a critical and commercial failure. William Boehnel of the New York World-Telegram called Stewart's performance emotionless, and Eileen Creelman of The New York Sun wrote that he made little attempt to look or sound French. Stewart's next film, The Last Gangster (1937) starring Edward G. Robinson, was also a failure, but it was followed by a critically acclaimed performance in Navy Blue and Gold (1937) as a football player at the United States Naval Academy. The film was a box-office success and earned Stewart the best reviews of his career up to that point. The New York Times wrote "the ending leaves us with the conviction that James Stewart is a sincere and likable triple-threat man in the [MGM] backfield" and Variety called his performance "fine".

=== 1938–1941: Leading man ===
Despite good reviews, Stewart was still a minor star, and MGM remained hesitant to cast him in leading roles, preferring to loan him out to other studios. After a well-received supporting part in Of Human Hearts (1938), he was loaned to RKO to act opposite Ginger Rogers in the romantic comedy Vivacious Lady (1938). The production was shut down for months in 1937 as Stewart recovered from an undisclosed illness, during which he was hospitalized. RKO initially wanted to replace Stewart, but eventually the project was canceled. However, Rogers' success in a stage musical caused the film to be picked up again. Stewart was recast in Vivacious Lady at Rogers' insistence and due to his performance in Of Human Hearts. It was a critical and commercial success, and showed Stewart's talent for performing in romantic comedies; The New York Herald called him "one of the most knowing and engaging young actors appearing on the screen at present".

Stewart's third film release of 1938, the First World War drama The Shopworn Angel, saw him collaborate again with Margaret Sullavan. In his performance, Stewart drew upon his own feelings of unrequited love towards Sullavan, who was married to his agent, Leland Hayward. Although the film was otherwise well-received, critics were mixed about Stewart. Bland Johaneson of the New York Daily Mirror compared him to Stan Laurel in this melodramatic film, and Variety called his performance unfocused.

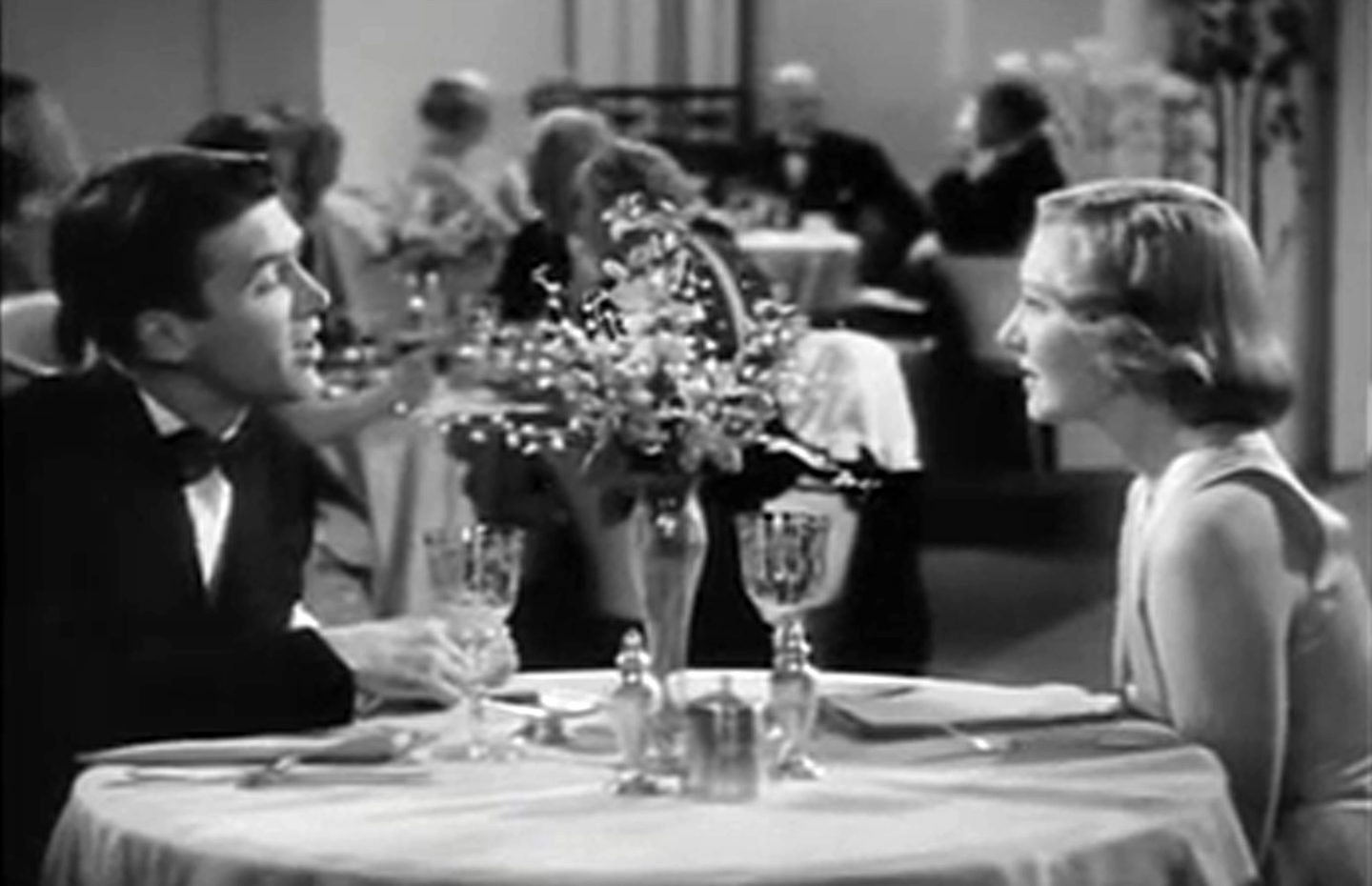
Stewart and Jean Arthur in Frank Capra's You Can't Take It with You (1938)

Stewart became a major star when he was loaned out to Columbia Pictures to play the lead role in Frank Capra's You Can't Take It with You (1938) opposite Jean Arthur. Stewart played the son of a banker who falls in love with a woman from a poor and eccentric family. Capra had recently completed several well-received films and was looking for a new type of leading man. He had been impressed by Stewart's role in Navy Blue and Gold (1937). According to Capra, Stewart was one of the best actors ever to hit the screen, understood character archetypes intuitively, and required little directing. You Can't Take It With You became the fifth highest-grossing film of the year and won the Academy Award for Best Picture. The film was also critically successful, but while Variety wrote that the performances of Stewart and Arthur garnered "much of the laughs", most of the critical acclaim went to Lionel Barrymore and Edward Arnold.

In contrast to the success of You Can't Take It With You, Stewart's first three film releases of 1939 were all commercial disappointments. In the melodrama Made for Each Other (1939), he shared the screen with Carole Lombard. Stewart blamed its directing and screenwriting for its poor box-office performance. Regardless, the film received favorable reviews, with Newsweek writing that Stewart and Lombard were "perfectly cast in the leading roles". The other two films, The Ice Follies of 1939 and It's a Wonderful World, were critical failures.

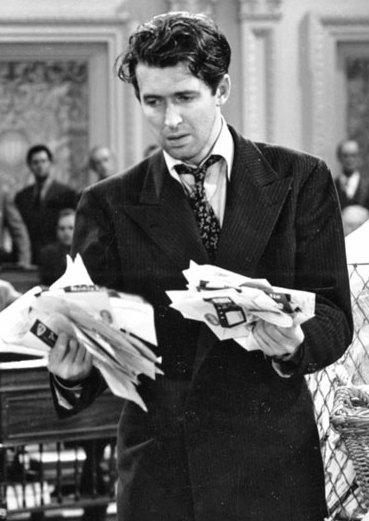
Stewart in Frank Capra's Mr. Smith Goes to Washington (1939)

In Stewart's fourth 1939 film, he worked with Capra and Arthur again in the political comedy-drama Mr. Smith Goes to Washington. Stewart played an idealist thrown into the political arena. It garnered critical praise and became the third-highest-grossing film of the year. The Nation stated "[Stewart] takes first place among Hollywood actors...Now he is mature and gives a difficult part, with many nuances, moments of tragic-comic impact." Later, critic Andrew Sarris qualified Stewart's performance as "lean, gangling, idealistic to the point of being neurotic, thoughtful to the point of being tongue-tied", describing him as "particularly gifted in expressing the emotional ambivalence of the action hero". Stewart won the New York Film Critics Circle award and received his first nomination for the Academy Award for Best Actor.

Stewart's last screen appearance of 1939 came in the Western Destry Rides Again, in which he portrayed a pacifist lawman alongside Marlene Dietrich, a saloon girl who falls in love with him. It was critically and commercially successful. TIME magazine wrote, "James Stewart, who had just turned in the top performance of his cinematurity as Jefferson Smith in Mr. Smith Goes to Washington, turns in as good a performance or better as Thomas Jefferson Destry." Between films, Stewart had begun a radio career and had become a distinctive voice on the Lux Radio Theater, The Screen Guild Theater, and other shows. So well-known had his slow drawl become that comedians began impersonating him.

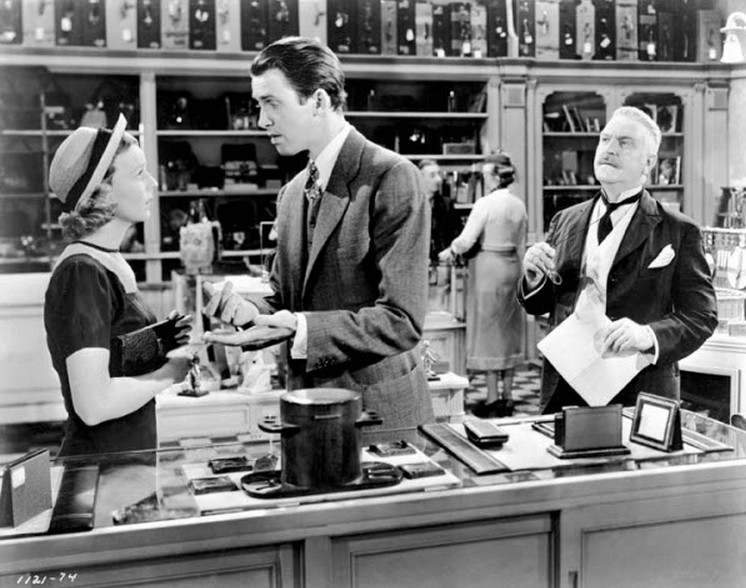
Margaret Sullavan and Stewart in their third collaboration, The Shop Around the Corner (1940)

Stewart and Sullavan reunited for two films in 1940. The Ernst Lubitsch romantic comedy The Shop Around the Corner starred them as co-workers who cannot stand each other but unknowingly become romantic pen-pals. It received good reviews and was a box-office success in Europe, but failed to find an audience in the US, where less-gentle screwball comedies were more popular. Director Lubitsch assessed it to be the best film of his career, and it has been regarded highly by later critics, such as Pauline Kael and Richard Schickel.

The drama The Mortal Storm, directed by Frank Borzage, featured Sullavan and Stewart as lovers caught in turmoil upon Hitler's rise to power. It was one of the first blatantly anti-Nazi films to be produced in Hollywood, but according to film scholar Ben Urwand, "ultimately made very little impact" as it did not show the persecution experienced by Jews or name that ethnic group. Despite being well received by critics, it failed at the box office. Ten days after filming The Mortal Storm, Stewart began filming No Time for Comedy (1940) with Rosalind Russell. Critics complimented Stewart's performance; Bosley Crowther of The New York Times called Stewart "the best thing in the show", yet the film was again not a box-office success.

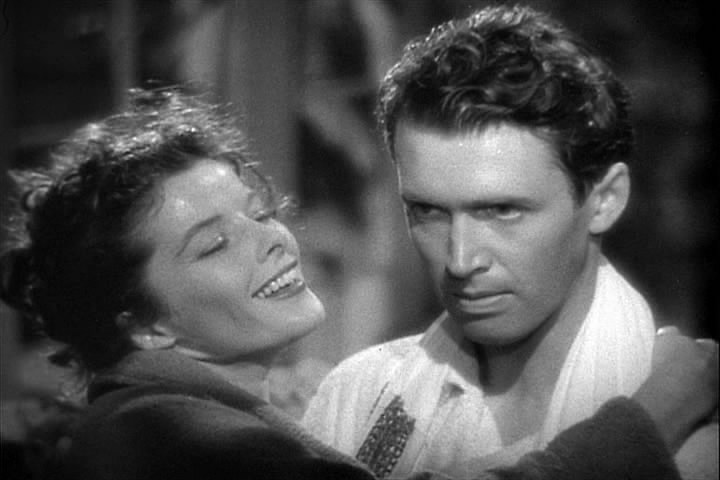
Katharine Hepburn and Stewart in The Philadelphia Story (1940), for which he won his only Academy Award for Best Actor

Stewart's final film to be released in 1940 was George Cukor's romantic comedy The Philadelphia Story, in which he played an intrusive, fast-talking reporter sent to cover the wedding of a socialite (Katharine Hepburn) with the help of her ex-husband (Cary Grant). The film became one of the largest box-office successes of the year and received widespread critical acclaim. The New York Herald Tribune stated that "Stewart...contributes most of the comedy to the show...In addition, he contributes some of the most irresistible romantic moments." His performance earned him his only Academy Award in a competitive category for Best Actor, beating out Henry Fonda, for whom he had voted and with whom he had once roomed, both almost broke, in the early 1930s in New York. Stewart himself assessed his performance in Mr. Smith to be superior and believed the academy was recompensing for not giving him the award the year prior. Moreover, Stewart's character was a supporting role, not the male lead. He gave the Oscar to his father, who displayed it at his hardware store alongside other family awards and military medals.

Stewart next appeared in two comedies: Come Live with Me (1941), which paired him with Hedy Lamarr, and Pot o' Gold (1941), featuring Paulette Goddard. Stewart considered the latter to be the worst film of his career. His last film before military service was the musical Ziegfeld Girl (1941), which co-starred Judy Garland, Hedy Lamarr, and Lana Turner. It was a critical failure, but also one of the best box-office performers of the year.

=== 1941–1947: Military service ===
Lieutenant James Stewart in Winning Your Wings (1942)

Stewart became the first major American movie star to enlist in the United States Army to fight in World War II. His family had deep military roots: both of his grandfathers had fought in the Civil War, and his father had served during both the Spanish–American War and World War I. After first being rejected for low weight in November 1940, he enlisted in February 1941. (Note: Stewart later confided that he had a "friend" operating the weight scales on his second and successful enlisting attempt.) As an experienced pilot, he reported for induction as a private in the Air Corps on March 22, 1941. Soon to be 33 years old, he was over the age limit for Aviation Cadet training—the normal path of commissioning for pilots, navigators and bombardiers—and therefore applied for an Air Corps commission as both a college graduate and a licensed commercial pilot. Stewart received his commission as a second lieutenant on January 1, 1942.

After enlisting, Stewart made no new commercial films, although he remained under contract to MGM. His public appearances were limited to engagements for the Army Air Forces. The Air Corps scheduled him on network radio with Edgar Bergen and Charlie McCarthy, and on the radio program We Hold These Truths, a celebration of the United States Bill of Rights, which was broadcast a week after the attack on Pearl Harbor. Stewart also appeared in a First Motion Picture Unit short film, Winning Your Wings, to help recruit airmen. Nominated for an Academy Award for Best Documentary in 1942, it appeared in movie theaters nationwide beginning in late May 1942 and resulted in 150,000 new recruits.

Stewart was concerned that his celebrity status would relegate him to duties behind the lines. After spending over a year training pilots at Kirtland Army Airfield in Albuquerque, New Mexico, he appealed to his commander and in November 1943 was sent to England as part of the 703d Bomb Squadron to fly B-24 Liberators. He was based initially at RAF Tibenham, before moving to RAF Old Buckenham.

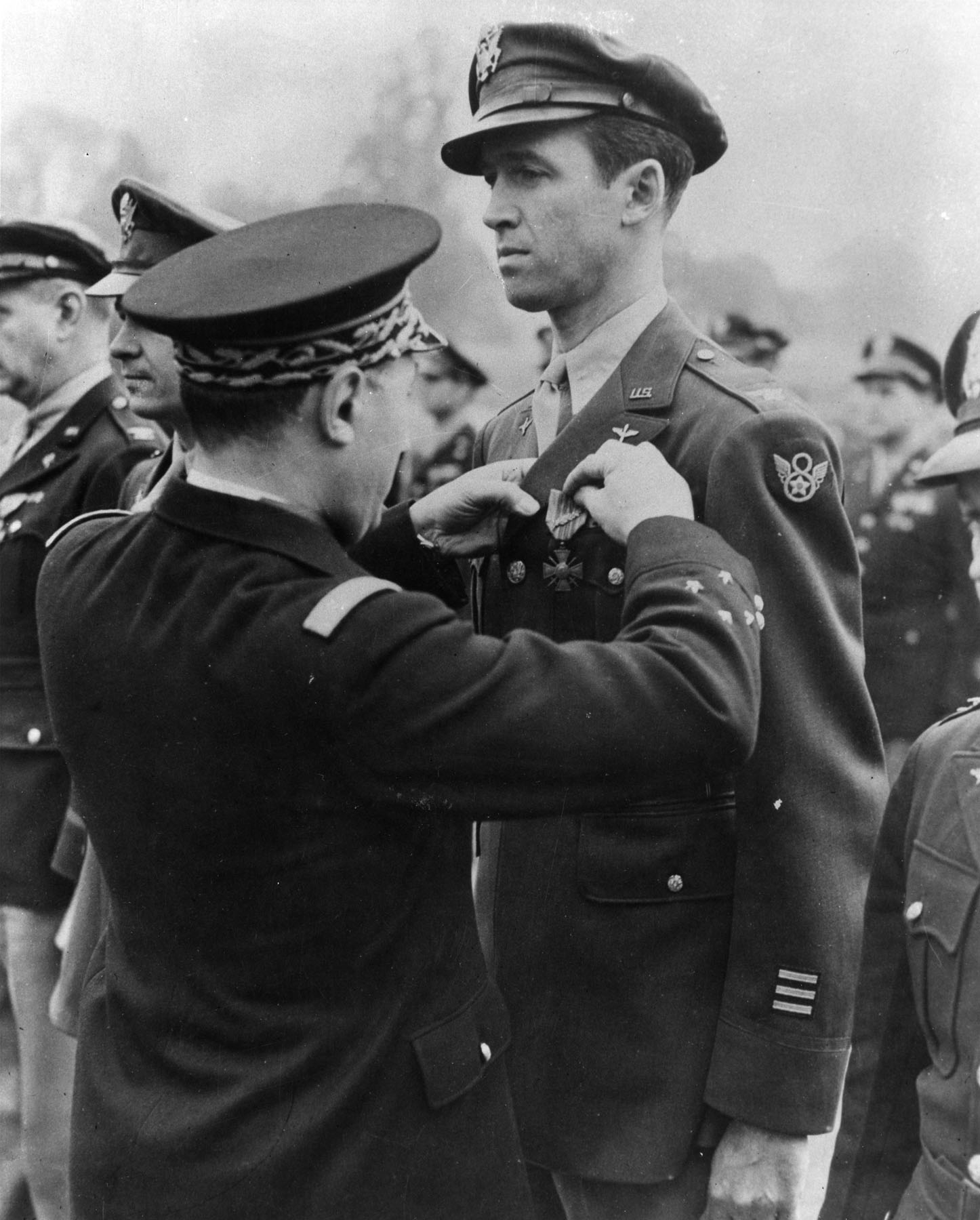
Colonel Stewart receiving the Croix de Guerre with Palm in 1944

Stewart was promoted to major following a mission to Ludwigshafen, Germany, on January 7, 1944. (Note: While leading the 445th on this date, Stewart made a decision in combat to not break formation from another group that had made an error in navigation. The other group lost four bombers in a subsequent interception, but Stewart's decision possibly saved it from annihilation and incurred considerable damage to his own 48 aircraft. His decision resulted in a letter of commendation and promotion to major on January 20, 1944. Sy Bartlett and Beirne Lay used the episode in their novel 12 O'Clock High.) He was awarded the Distinguished Flying Cross for actions as deputy commander of the 2nd Bombardment Wing, the French Croix de Guerre with palm, and the Air Medal with three oak leaf clusters. Stewart was promoted to full colonel on March 29, 1945, becoming one of the few Americans to ever rise from private to colonel in only four years. At the beginning of June 1945, Stewart was the presiding officer of the court martial of a pilot and navigator who accidentally bombed Zurich, Switzerland.

Stewart returned to the United States in early fall 1945. He continued to play a role in reserve of the Army after the war and was also one of the 12 founders of the Air Force Association in October 1945. Stewart eventually transferred to the reserves of the United States Air Force after the Army Air Forces split from the Army in 1947. During active-duty periods, he served with the Strategic Air Command and completed transition training as a pilot on the B-47 and B-52.

Stewart was first nominated for promotion to brigadier general in February 1957; however, his promotion was initially opposed by Senator Margaret Chase Smith. At the time of the nomination, the Washington Daily News noted: "He trains actively with the Reserve every year. He's had 18 hours as first pilot of a B-52." On July 23, 1959, Stewart was promoted to brigadier general, becoming the highest-ranking actor in American military history. During the Vietnam War, he flew as a non-duty observer in a B-52 on an Arc Light bombing mission in February 1966. He served for 27 years, officially retiring from the Air Force on May 31, 1968, when he reached the mandatory retirement age of 60. Upon his retirement, he was awarded the Air Force Distinguished Service Medal. Stewart rarely spoke about his wartime service but did appear in an episode of the British television documentary series The World at War (1974), commenting on the disastrous 1943 mission against Schweinfurt, Germany.

=== 1946–1949: Early post-war films ===
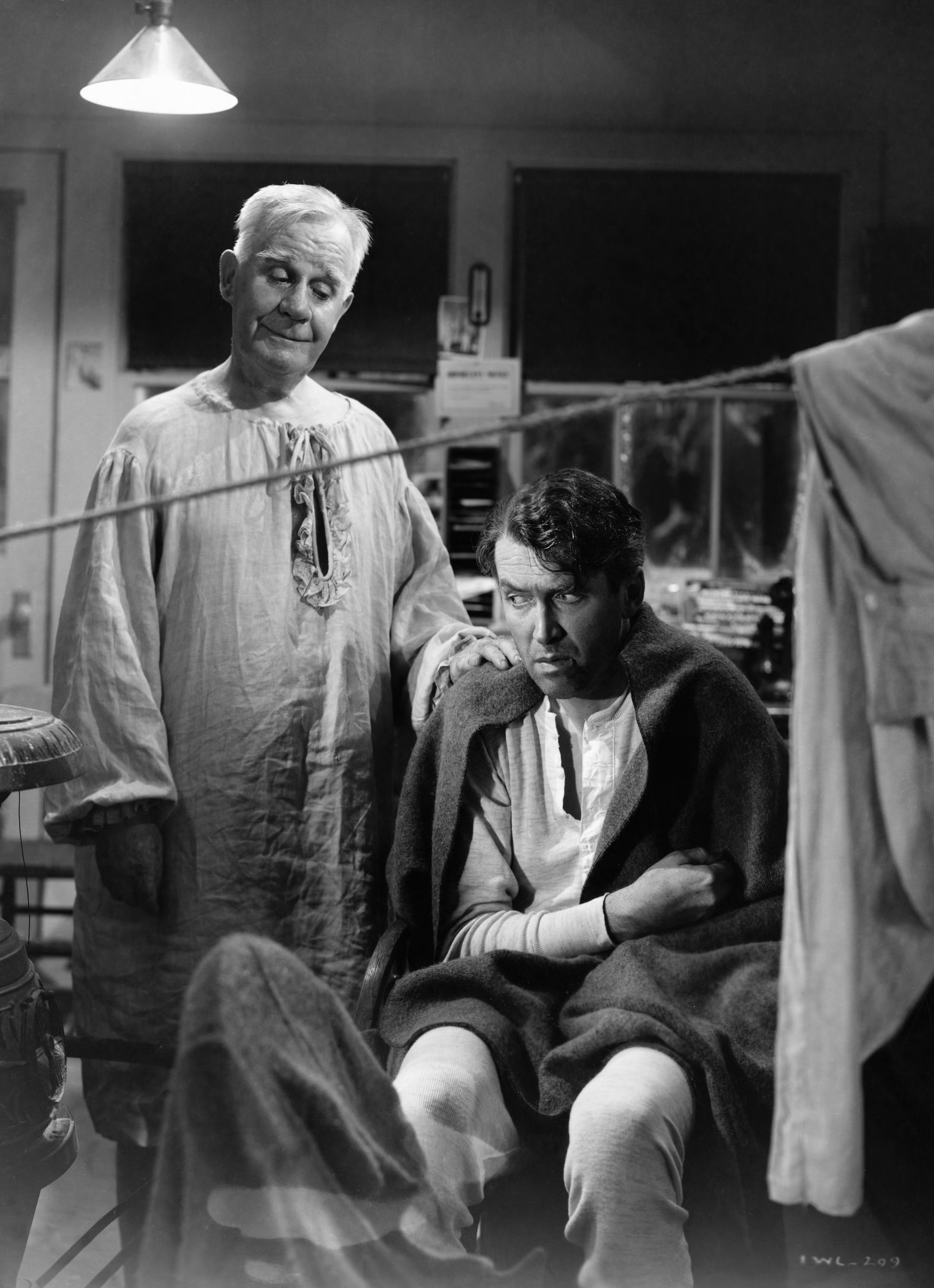
Stewart as George Bailey and Travers as Clarence Odbody in It's a Wonderful Life (1946). Although only a moderate success at the time of its release, the film has later come to define Stewart's legacy.

After his experiences in the war, Stewart considered returning to Pennsylvania to run the family store. His former agent, Leland Hayward, had also left the talent business in 1944 after selling his roster of stars, including Stewart, to Music Corporation of America (MCA). Stewart decided not to renew his MGM contract and instead signed a deal with MCA. He later stated that he was given a new beginning by Frank Capra, who asked him to star in It's a Wonderful Life (1946), the first postwar film for both of them. Stewart played George Bailey, an upstanding small-town man who becomes increasingly frustrated by his ordinary existence and financial troubles. Driven to suicide on Christmas Eve, he is led to reassess his life by Clarence Odbody, an "angel, second class", played by Henry Travers. During filming, Stewart experienced doubts about his abilities and continued to consider retiring from acting.

Although It's a Wonderful Life was nominated for five Academy Awards, including Stewart's third Best Actor nomination, it received mixed reviews and was only a moderate success at the box office, failing to cover its production costs. Several critics found the movie too sentimental, although Bosley Crowther wrote that Stewart did a "warmly appealing job, indicating that he has grown in spiritual stature as well as in talent during the years he was in the war", and President Harry S. Truman concluded that "If [my wife] and I had a son we'd want him to be just like Jimmy Stewart [in this film]." In the decades since its release, It's a Wonderful Life has grown to define Stewart's film persona and is widely considered a Christmas classic, and according to the American Film Institute, is one of the 100 best American movies ever made. Andrew Sarris stated that Stewart's performance was underappreciated by critics of the time, who could not see "the force and fury" of it, and considered his proposal scene with Donna Reed, "one of the most sublimely histrionic expressions of passion". Stewart later named the film his personal favorite out of his filmography.

In the aftermath of It's A Wonderful Life, Capra's production company went into bankruptcy, while Stewart continued to have doubts about his acting abilities. His generation of actors was fading, and a new wave of actors, including Marlon Brando, Montgomery Clift, and James Dean, would soon remake Hollywood. Stewart returned to making radio dramas in 1946; he continued this work between films until the mid-1950s. He also made a comeback on Broadway to star in Mary Coyle Chase's Harvey in July 1947, replacing the original star Frank Fay for the duration of his vacation. The play had opened to nearly universal praise in 1944 and told the story of Elwood P. Dowd, a wealthy eccentric, whose best friend is an invisible man-sized rabbit and whose relatives are trying to get him committed to a mental asylum. Stewart gained a following in the unconventional play, and although Fay returned to the role in August, they decided that Stewart would take his place again the next summer. Stewart's only film to be released in 1947 was the William A. Wellman comedy Magic Town, one of the first films about the new science of public opinion polling. It was poorly received both commercially and critically.

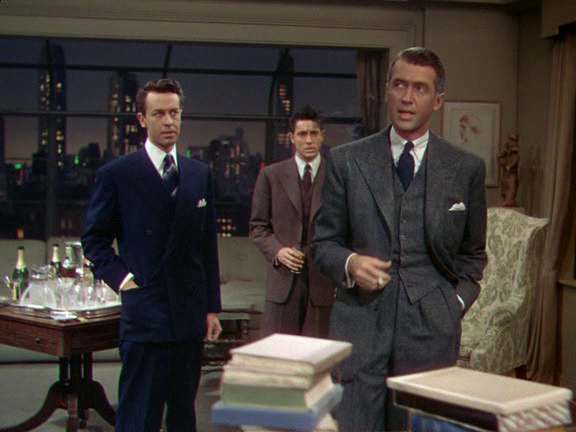
Stewart with Farley Granger and John Dall in Rope (1948), his first collaboration with Alfred Hitchcock. He was criticized for being miscast in the role of a cynical professor.

Stewart appeared in four new film releases in 1948. Call Northside 777 was a critically acclaimed film noir, while the musical comedy On Our Merry Way, in which Stewart and Henry Fonda played jazz musicians in an ensemble cast, was a critical and commercial failure. The comedy You Gotta Stay Happy, which paired Stewart with Joan Fontaine, was the most successful of his post-war films up to that point. Rope, in which Stewart played the idolized teacher of two young men who commit murder to show their supposed superiority, began his collaboration with Alfred Hitchcock. Shot in long "real-time" takes, Stewart felt pressure to be flawless in his performance; the added stress led to him sleeping very little and drinking more heavily. Rope received mixed reviews, and Andrew Sarris and Scott Eyman have later called him miscast in the role of a Nietzsche-loving philosophy professor. The film's screenwriter Arthur Laurents also stated that "the casting of [Stewart] was absolutely destructive. He's not sexual as an actor."

Stewart found success again with The Stratton Story (1949), playing baseball champion Monty Stratton opposite June Allyson. It became the sixth highest-grossing film of 1949 and was well received by the critics. The New York Times noted, "The Stratton Story was the best thing that has yet happened to Mr. Stewart in his post-war film career...he gives such a winning performance that it is almost impossible to imagine any one else playing the role." Stewart's other 1949 release saw him reunited with Spencer Tracy in the World War II film Malaya (1949). It was a commercial failure and received mixed reviews.

=== 1950–1959: Collaborations with Alfred Hitchcock and Anthony Mann ===
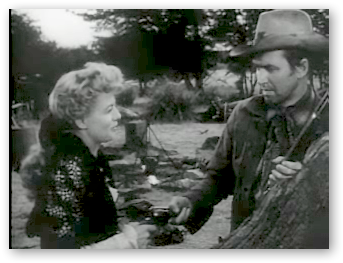
Stewart with Shelley Winters in Winchester '73, his first project with Anthony Mann. In the 1950s, Stewart redefined his career as a star of Western films.

In the 1950s, Stewart experienced a career renewal as the star of Westerns and collaborated on several films with director Anthony Mann. The first of these was the Universal production Winchester '73 (1950), which Stewart agreed to do in exchange for being cast in a screen adaptation of Harvey. It also marked a turning point in Hollywood, as Stewart's agent, Lew Wasserman, brokered an innovative deal with Universal, in which Stewart would receive no fee in exchange for a percentage of the profits. Stewart was also granted authority to collaborate with the studio on casting and hiring decisions. Stewart ended up earning about $600,000 for Winchester '73, significantly more than his usual fee, and other stars quickly capitalized on this new way of doing business, which further undermined the decaying studio system.

Stewart chose Mann to direct, and the film gave him the idea of redefining his screen persona through the Western genre. In the film, Stewart is a tough, vengeful sharpshooter, the winner of a prized rifle that is stolen and passes through many hands, until the showdown between him and his brother. Winchester '73 became a box-office success upon its summer release and earned Stewart rave reviews. He also starred in another successful Western that summer, Broken Arrow (1950), which featured him as an ex-soldier and Native American agent making peace with the Apache.

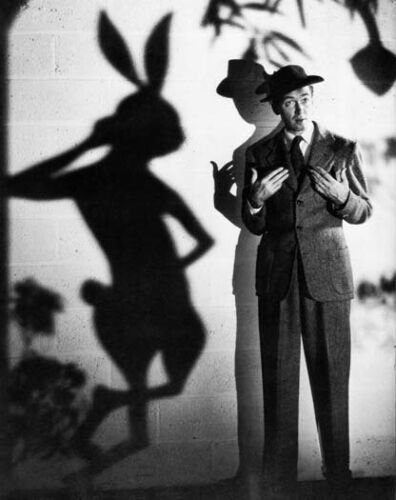
Stewart in Harvey (1950), the only film for which he received both an Academy Award nomination and a Golden Globe nomination

Stewart's third film release of 1950 was the comedy The Jackpot; it received critical acclaim and was commercially successful, but was a minor film in his repertoire and has largely been forgotten by contemporary critics and fans. In December 1950, the screen adaptation of Harvey was released, directed by Henry Koster and with Stewart reprising his stage role. With critics comparing his performance with Fay's, Stewart's performance as well as the film itself received mixed reviews. Bosley Crowther of The New York Times wrote that "so darling is the acting of James Stewart [...] and all the rest that a virtually brand-new experience is still in store for even those who saw the play", while Variety called him "perfect" in the role. John McCarten of the New Yorker stated that although he "doesn't bring his part to the battered authority of Frank Fay...he nevertheless succeeds in making plausible the notion that Harvey, the rabbit, would accept him as a pal." Stewart later stated that he was dissatisfied with his performance, stating, "I played him a little too dreamily, a little too cute-cute." Despite the film's poor box office performance, Stewart received his fourth Academy Award nomination as well as his first Golden Globe nomination. Similar to It's a Wonderful Life, Harvey achieved popularity later, after frequent television showings.

Stewart appeared in only one film released in 1951, playing a scientist in Koster's British production No Highway in the Sky, which was one of the first airplane disaster films ever made. Filmed in England, it became a box office success in the United Kingdom, but failed to attract audiences in the United States. Stewart took a small supporting role as a troubled clown in Cecil B. DeMille's The Greatest Show on Earth (1952), which went on to win the Academy Award for Best Picture. Critics were curious why Stewart had taken such a small, out-of-character role; he responded that he was inspired by Lon Chaney's ability to disguise himself while letting his character emerge. In the same year, Stewart starred in a critically and commercially failed biopic, Carbine Williams (1952), and continued his collaboration with Mann in Bend of the River (1952), which was a commercial and critical success.

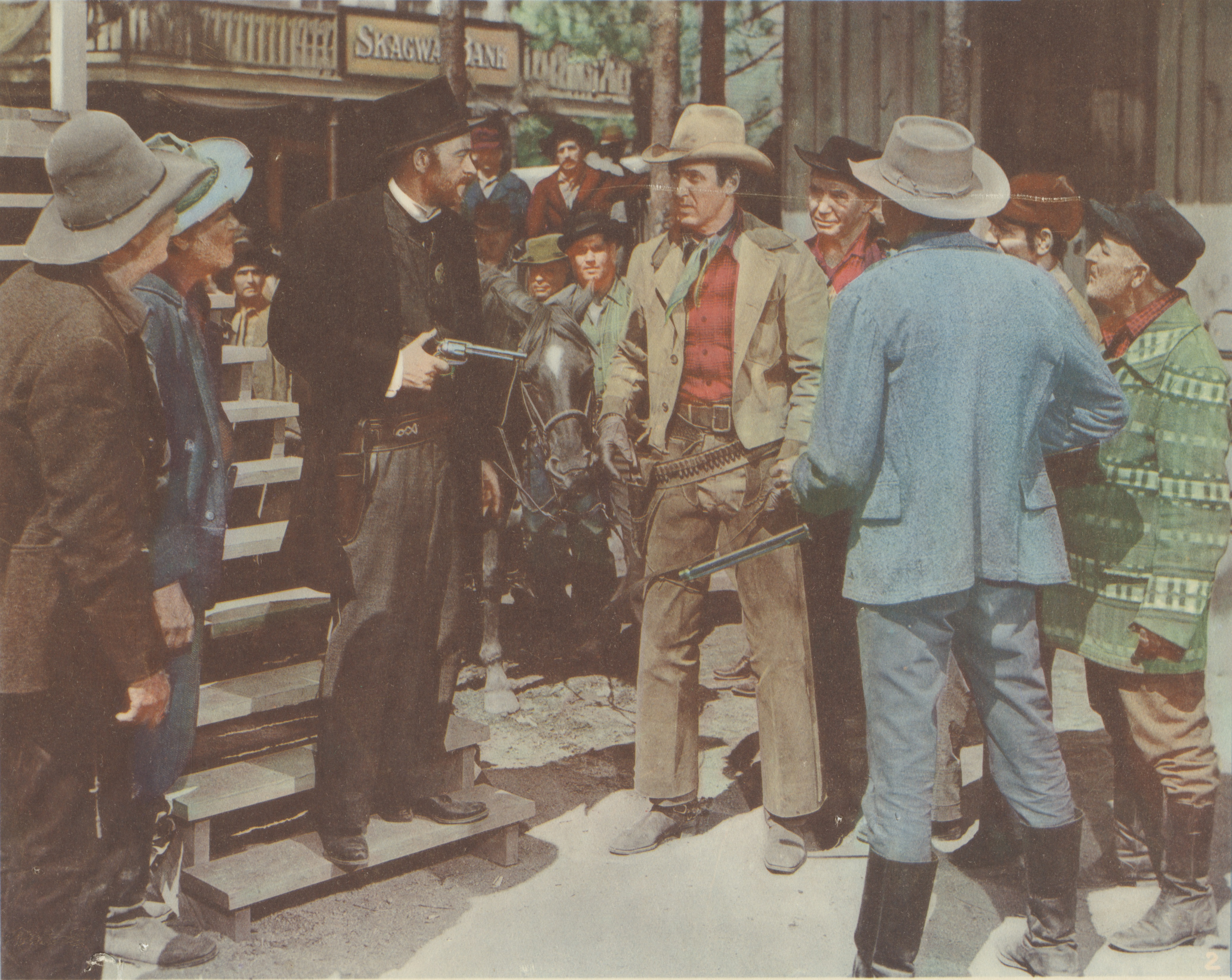
John McIntire and Stewart in The Far Country (1955)

Stewart followed Bend of the River with four more collaborations with Mann in the next two years. The Naked Spur (1953) and The Far Country (1954) were successful with audiences and developed Stewart's screen persona into a more mature, ambiguous, and edgier presence. The films featured him as troubled cowboys seeking redemption while facing corrupt cattlemen, ranchers, and outlaws; a man who knows violence first-hand and struggles to control it. The Stewart–Mann collaborations laid the foundation for many of the Westerns of the 1950s and remain popular today for their grittier, more realistic depiction of the classic movie genre. In addition, Stewart starred in the Western radio show The Six Shooter for its one-season run from 1953 to 1954. He and Mann also collaborated on films outside the Western genre such as Thunder Bay (1953) and The Glenn Miller Story (1954), the latter a critically acclaimed biopic in which he starred opposite June Allyson. It earned Stewart a BAFTA nomination and continued his portrayals of 'American heroes'.

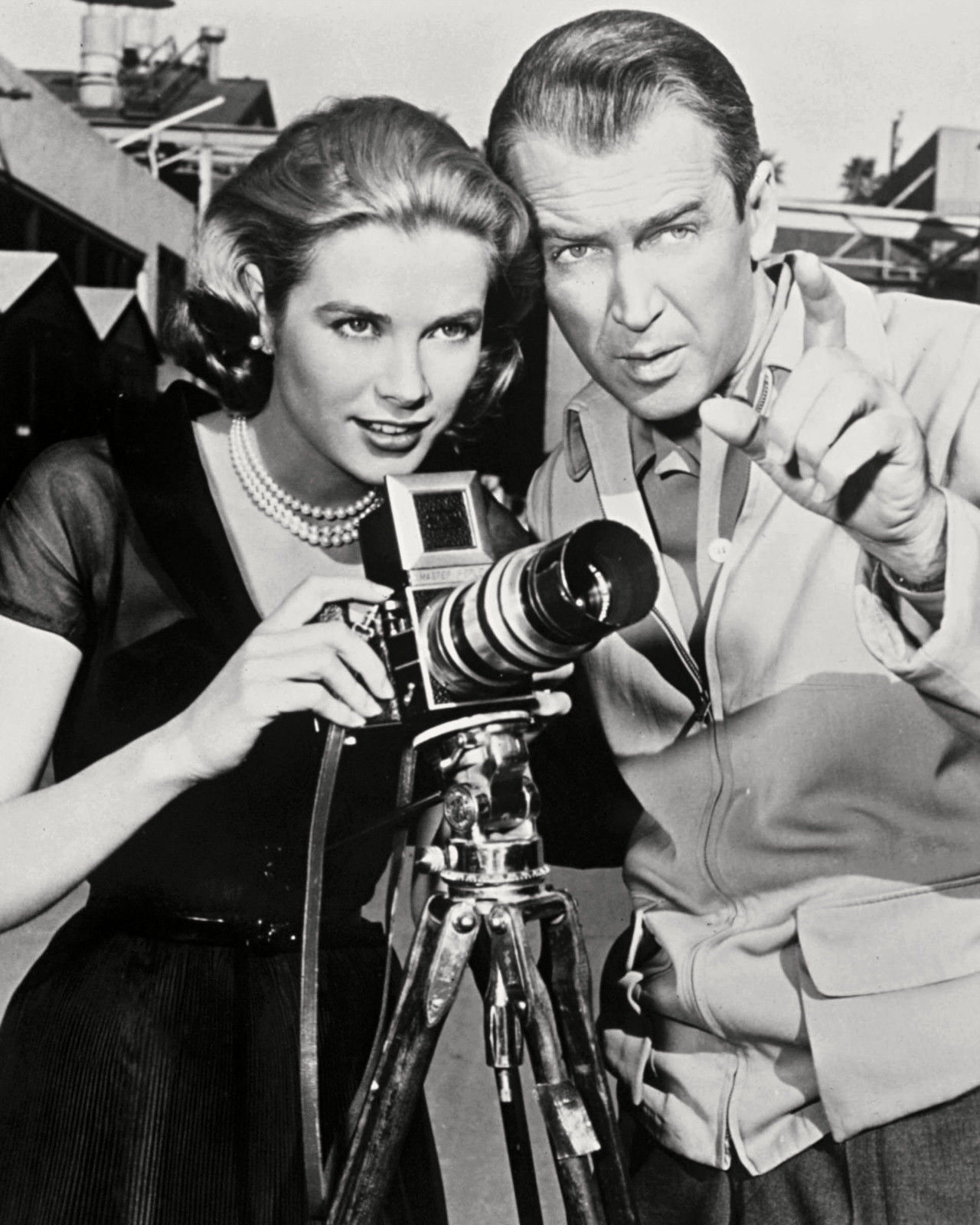
Stewart with co-star Grace Kelly in Rear Window (1954), which allowed him to explore new depths of his screen persona

Stewart's second collaboration with Hitchcock, the thriller Rear Window, became the eighth highest-grossing film of 1954. Hitchcock and Stewart also formed a corporation, Patron Inc., to produce the film. (Note: The company later became the subject of a Supreme Court case Stewart v. Abend (1990).) Stewart portrayed a photographer, loosely based on Robert Capa, who projects his fantasies and fears onto the people he observes out his apartment window while on hiatus due to a broken leg and comes to believe that he has witnessed a murder. Limited by his wheelchair, Stewart had to react to what his character sees with mostly facial responses. Like Mann, Hitchcock uncovered new depths to Stewart's acting, showing a protagonist confronting his fears and repressed desires. Although most of the initial acclaim for Rear Window was directed towards Hitchcock, critic Vincent Canby later described Stewart's performance in it as "grand" and stated that "[his] longtime star status in Hollywood has always obscured recognition of his talent." 1954 was a landmark year in Stewart's career in terms of audience success, and he topped Look magazine's list of the most-popular movie stars, displacing rival Western star John Wayne.

Stewart continued his successful box-office run with two collaborations with Mann in 1955. Strategic Air Command paired him again with June Allyson in a film focusing on the Cold War. Stewart took a central role in its development, using his experiences from the air force. Despite criticism for the dry, mechanistic storyline, it became the sixth highest-grossing film of 1955. Stewart's final collaboration with Mann in the Western genre, The Man from Laramie, one of the first Westerns to be shot in CinemaScope, was well received by the critics and audiences alike. Following his work with Mann, Stewart starred opposite Doris Day in Hitchcock's remake of his earlier film The Man Who Knew Too Much (1956). The film was another success. Even though critics preferred the first version, Hitchcock himself considered his remake superior.

Stewart's next film, Billy Wilder's The Spirit of St. Louis (1957), saw him star as his young adulthood hero, Charles Lindbergh. It was a big-budget production with elaborate special effects for the flying sequences, but received only mixed reviews and did not earn back its production costs. Stewart ended the year with a starring role in the Western Night Passage (1957), which had originally been slated as his ninth collaboration with Mann. During the pre-production, a rift developed between Mann and writer Borden Chase over the script, which Mann considered weak. Mann decided to leave the film and never collaborated with Stewart again. James Neilson replaced Mann, and the film opened in 1957 to become a box-office flop. Soured by this failure, Stewart avoided the genre and would not make another Western for four years.

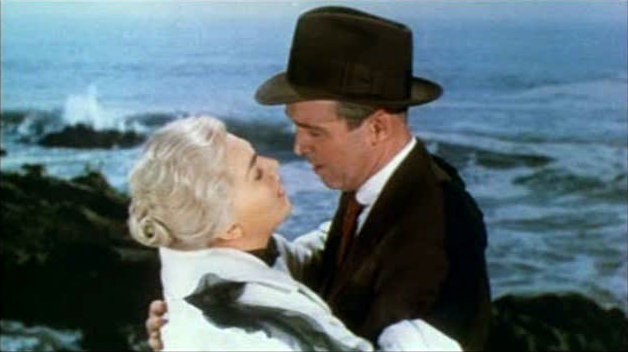
Stewart's last collaboration with Hitchcock was Vertigo (1958), in which he co-starred with Kim Novak.

Stewart's collaboration with Hitchcock ended the following year with Vertigo (1958), in which he starred as an acrophobic former policeman who becomes obsessed with a woman (Kim Novak) he is shadowing. Although Vertigo has later become considered one of Hitchcock's key works and was ranked the greatest film ever made by the Sight & Sound critics' poll in 2012, it was met with unenthusiastic reviews and poor box-office receipts upon its release. Regardless, several critics complimented Stewart for his performance, with Bosley Crowther noting, "Mr. Stewart, as usual, manages to act awfully tense in a casual way."

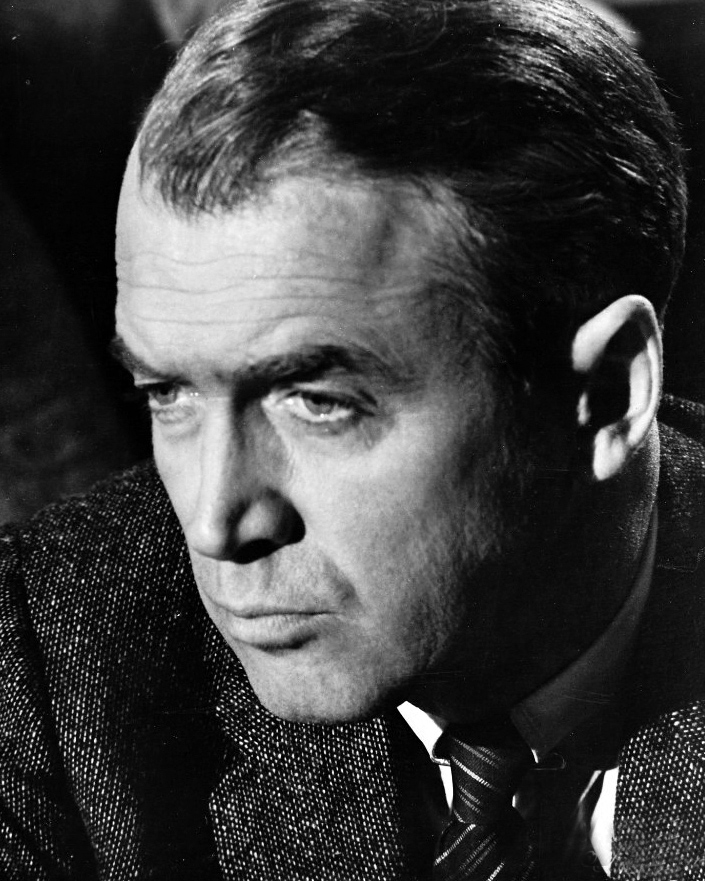
Stewart in Anatomy of a Murder (1959), which garnered him his final Academy Award nomination

Hitchcock blamed the film's failure on Stewart being too old to convincingly be Novak's love interest: he was fifty years old at the time and had begun wearing a silver hairpiece in his movies. Consequently, Hitchcock cast Cary Grant in his next film, North by Northwest (1959), a role Stewart wanted; Grant was four years older than Stewart but photographed much younger. Stewart's second 1958 film release, the romantic comedy Bell, Book and Candle (1958), also paired him with Kim Novak, with Stewart later echoing Hitchcock in saying that he was miscast as 25-year-old Novak's romantic partner. The film and Stewart's performance received poor reviews and resulted in a box office failure. However, according to film scholar David Bingham, by the early 1950s, "Stewart's personality was so credible and well-established", that his choice of role no longer affected his popularity.

Stewart ended the decade with Otto Preminger's realistic courtroom drama Anatomy of a Murder (1959) and the crime film The FBI Story (1959). The former was a box office success despite its explicit dealing with subjects such as rape, and garnered good reviews. Stewart received critical acclaim for his role as a small-town lawyer involved in a difficult murder case; Bosley Crowther called it "one of the finest performances of his career". Stewart won his first BAFTA, a Volpi Cup, a New York Film Critics Circle Award, and a Producers Guild of America Award, as well as earned his fifth and final Academy Award nomination for his performance. The FBI Story, in which Stewart portrayed a Depression-era FBI agent, was less well received by critics and was commercially unsuccessful. Despite its commercial failure, the film marked the close of the most commercially successful decade of Stewart's career. According to Quigley's annual poll, Stewart was one of the top money-making stars for ten years, appearing in the top ten in 1950, 1952–1959, and 1965. He topped the list in 1955.

=== 1960–1970: Westerns and later career ===
The Man Who Shot Liberty Valance (1962)

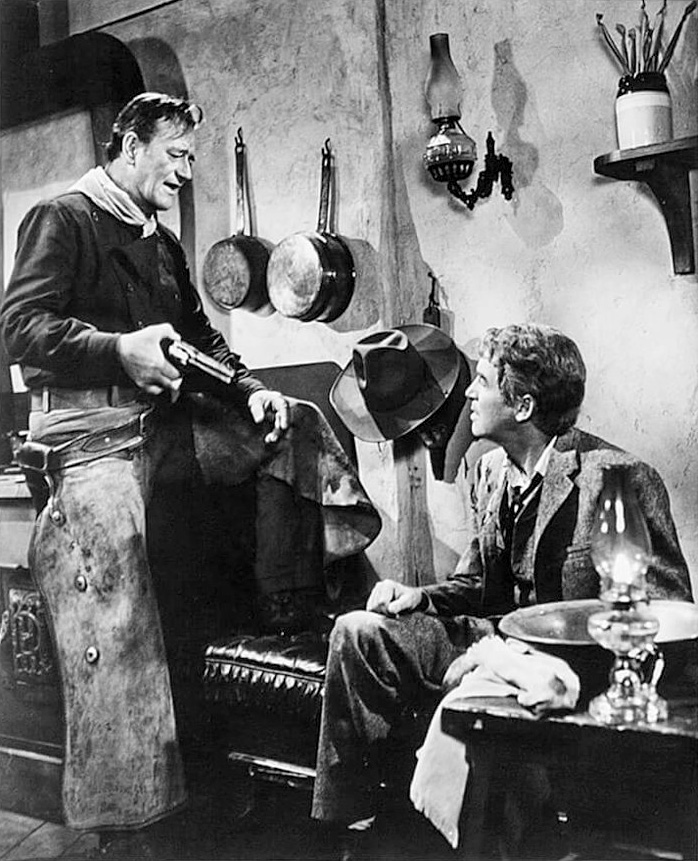
John Wayne and Stewart

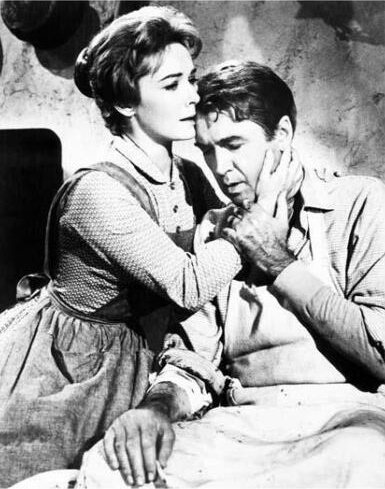
Vera Miles and Stewart

Stewart opened the new decade by starring in the war film The Mountain Road (1960). To his surprise, it was a box office failure, despite his claims that it was one of the best scripts he'd ever read. He began a new director collaboration with John Ford, making his debut in his films in the Western Two Rode Together (1961), which had thematic echoes of Ford's The Searchers. The same year, he also narrated the film X-15 for the USAF. Stewart was considered for the role of Atticus Finch in the 1962 film adaptation of Harper Lee's novel To Kill a Mockingbird, but he turned it down, concerned that the story was too controversial.

Stewart and Ford's next collaboration was The Man Who Shot Liberty Valance (1962). A classic psychological Western, the picture was shot in black-and-white film noir style at Ford's insistence, with Stewart as an East Coast attorney who goes against his non-violent principles when he is forced to confront a psychopathic outlaw (Lee Marvin) in a small frontier town. The complex film initially garnered mixed reviews but became a critical favorite over the ensuing decades. Stewart was billed above John Wayne in posters and the trailers, but Wayne received top billing in the film itself. Stewart, Wayne, and Ford also collaborated for a television play that same year, Flashing Spikes (1962), for ABC's anthology series Alcoa Premiere, albeit featuring Wayne billed with a television pseudonym, "Michael Morris", (also used for Wayne's brief appearance in the John Ford-directed episode of the television series Wagon Train titled "The Colter Craven Story") for his lengthy cameo. Next, Stewart appeared as part of an all-star cast—including Henry Fonda and John Wayne—in How the West Was Won, a Western epic released in the United States in early 1963. The film went on to win three Academy Awards and reap massive box-office figures.

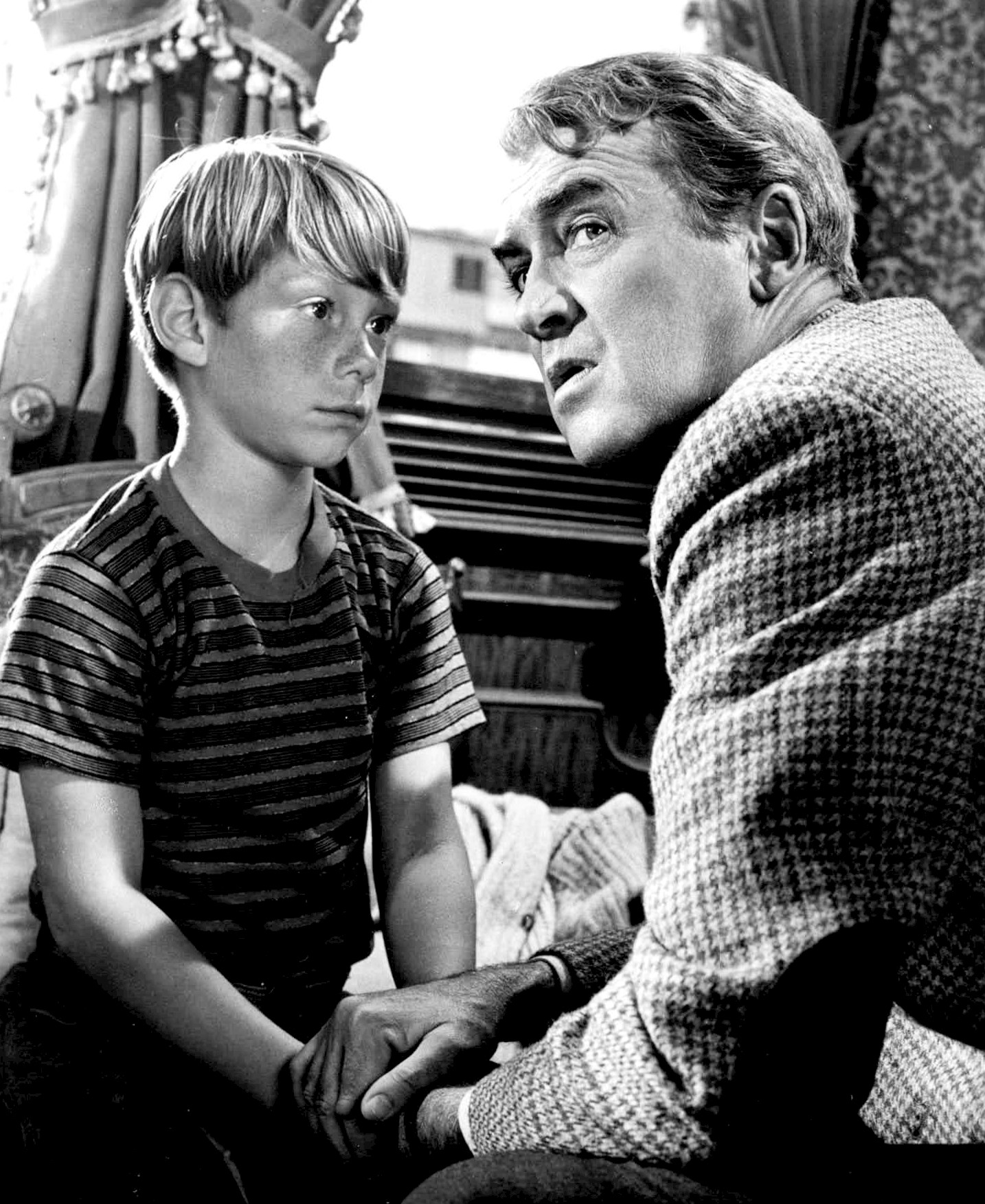
With Bill Mumy in Dear Brigitte (1965)

In 1962, Stewart signed a multi-movie deal with 20th Century Fox. The first two of these films reunited him with director Henry Koster in the family-friendly comedies Mr. Hobbs Takes a Vacation (1962) with Maureen O'Hara and Take Her, She's Mine (1963), which were both box-office successes. The former received moderately positive reviews and won Stewart the Silver Bear for Best Actor at the Berlin International Film Festival; the latter was panned by the critics. Stewart then appeared in John Ford's final Western, Cheyenne Autumn (1964), playing a white-suited Wyatt Earp in a long semi-comedic sequence in the middle of the movie. The film failed domestically and was quickly forgotten.

In 1965, Stewart was given his first honorary award for his career, the Cecil B. DeMille Award. He appeared in three films that year. The Fox family-comedy Dear Brigitte (1965), which featured French actress Brigitte Bardot as the object of Stewart's son's infatuation, was a box-office failure. The Civil War film Shenandoah (1965) was a commercial success with strong anti-war and humanitarian themes. The Flight of the Phoenix (1965) continued Stewart's series of aviation-themed films; it was well-received critically, but a box-office failure.

For the next few years, Stewart acted in a series of Westerns: The Rare Breed (1966) with Maureen O'Hara, Firecreek (1968) with Henry Fonda, Bandolero! (1968) with Dean Martin, and The Cheyenne Social Club (1970) with Henry Fonda again. In 1968, he received the Screen Actors Guild Life Achievement Award. Stewart returned on Broadway to reprise his role as Elwood P. Dowd in Harvey at the ANTA Theatre in February 1970; the revival ran until May. He won the Drama Desk Award for Outstanding Performance for it.

=== 1971–1997: Television and semi-retirement ===
In 1971, Stewart starred in the NBC sitcom The Jimmy Stewart Show. He played a small-town college professor whose adult son moves back home with his family. Stewart disliked the amount of work needed to film the show each week and was relieved when it was canceled after only one season due to bad reviews and poor ratings. His only film release for 1971, the comedy-drama Fools' Parade, was more positively received. Robert Greenspun of The New York Times stated that "the movie belongs to Stewart, who has never been more wonderful". For his contributions to Western films, Stewart was inducted into the Hall of Great Western Performers at the National Cowboy & Western Heritage Museum in Oklahoma City in 1972.

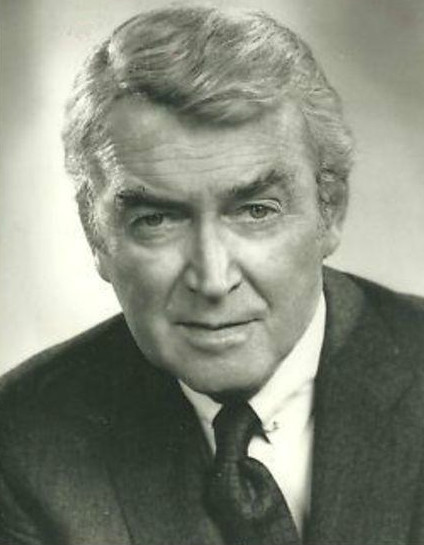
Stewart in a publicity still for the mystery series Hawkins (1973), which ran for one season.

Stewart returned to television in Harvey for NBC's Hallmark Hall of Fame series in 1972 and then starred in the CBS mystery series Hawkins in 1973. Playing a small-town lawyer investigating mysterious cases—similar to his character in Anatomy of a Murder—Stewart won a Golden Globe for his performance. Nevertheless, Hawkins failed to gain a wide audience, possibly because it rotated with Shaft, which had a starkly conflicting demographic, and was canceled after one season. Stewart also periodically appeared on Johnny Carson's The Tonight Show, sharing poems he had written at different times in his life. His poems were later compiled into a short collection, Jimmy Stewart and His Poems (1989).

After performing again in Harvey at the Prince of Wales Theatre in London in 1975, Stewart returned to films with a major supporting role in John Wayne's final film, The Shootist (1976), playing a doctor giving Wayne's gunfighter a terminal cancer diagnosis. By this time, Stewart had a hearing impairment, which affected his ability to hear his cues and led to him repeatedly flubbing his lines; his vanity would not allow him to admit this or to wear a hearing aid. Stewart was offered the role of Howard Beale in Network (1976) but refused it due to its explicit language. Instead, he appeared in supporting roles in the disaster film Airport '77 (1977) with Jack Lemmon, the remake of The Big Sleep (1978) with Robert Mitchum as Philip Marlowe, and the family film The Magic of Lassie (1978). Despite mixed reviews, Airport '77 was a box-office success, but the two other films were commercial and critical failures. Harry Haun of New York Daily News wrote in his review of The Big Sleep that it was "really sad to see James Stewart struggle so earnestly with material that just isn't there". Stewart made a memorable cameo appearance on the final episode of The Carol Burnett Show in March 1978, surprising Burnett, a lifelong Stewart fan.

Stewart's final live-action feature film was the critically panned Japanese film The Green Horizon (1980), directed by Susumu Hani. Stewart took the role because the film promoted wildlife conservation and allowed his family to travel with him to Kenya. In the 1980s, Stewart semi-retired from acting. He was offered the role of Norman Thayer in On Golden Pond (1981) but turned it down because he disliked the film's father-daughter relationship; the role went instead to his friend, Henry Fonda. Stewart filmed two television movies in the 1980s: Mr. Krueger's Christmas (1980), produced by the Church of Jesus Christ of Latter-day Saints, which allowed him to fulfill a lifelong dream to conduct the Mormon Tabernacle Choir, and Right of Way (1983), an HBO drama that co-starred Bette Davis. He also made an appearance in the historical miniseries North and South in 1986 and did voiceover work for commercials for Campbell's Soups in the 1980s and 1990s. Stewart's last film performance was voicing the character of Sheriff Wylie Burp in the animated movie An American Tail: Fievel Goes West (1991).

Stewart remained in the public eye due to his frequent visits to the White House during the Reagan administration. The re-release of Hitchcock films gained him renewed recognition, with Rear Window and Vertigo praised by film critics. Stewart also received several honorary film industry awards at the end of his career: an American Film Institute Award in 1980, a Silver Bear in 1982, Kennedy Center Honors in 1983, an Academy Honorary Award in 1985, and National Board of Review and Film Society of Lincoln Center's Chaplin Award in 1990. The honorary Oscar was presented by former co-star Cary Grant "for his 50 years of memorable performances, for his high ideals both on and off the screen, with respect and affection of his colleagues". In addition, Stewart received the highest civilian award in the US, the Presidential Medal of Freedom, "for his contributions in the fields of the arts, entertainment and public service", in 1985.

== Personal life ==
=== Romantic relationships ===
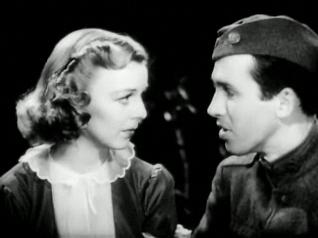
Margaret Sullavan and Stewart in The Shopworn Angel (1938), their second film collaboration.

Margaret Sullavan was a close friend and mentor who had a significant influence on Stewart's early life and career. They met while performing with the University Players, and Stewart developed romantic feelings for her and invited her on a date. However, Sullavan regarded him as a close friend and colleague rather than a romantic partner. Although she was aware of his feelings, Stewart never directly expressed them to her. She felt protective and maternal toward him rather than romantically attracted to him.

The director of The Shopworn Angel, H. C. Potter, suggested that they might have married had Stewart been more forthcoming about his feelings. Instead, Sullavan became his acting mentor in Hollywood. According to director Edward H. Griffith, she "made [him] a star" by co-starring with him in four films: Next Time We Love (1936), The Shopworn Angel (1938), The Shop Around the Corner (1940), and The Mortal Storm (1940).

Stewart did not marry until his forties, attracting considerable media attention. Gossip columnist Hedda Hopper called him the "Great American Bachelor". Among his earlier relationships was one with Ginger Rogers, whom he dated in 1935 after being introduced by Henry Fonda, who was then dating Rogers' good friend Lucille Ball.

During production of The Shopworn Angel (1938), Stewart dated actress Norma Shearer for six weeks. He subsequently dated Loretta Young, but she wanted to settle down while Stewart was not ready to do so.

While filming Destry Rides Again (1939), Stewart had an affair with his co-star Marlene Dietrich, who was married at the time. Dietrich allegedly became pregnant, but reportedly had an abortion. Stewart ended their relationship after filming was completed. Hurt by his rejection, Dietrich rarely mentioned him in her memoirs and dismissed their relationship as a brief affair.

Stewart also dated Olivia de Havilland in the late 1930s and early 1940s and proposed marriage to her, but she declined, believing he was not ready to settle down. She ended their relationship shortly before he began his military service, having fallen in love with director John Huston. Stewart was also romantically linked to Lana Turner, Anita Colby, and Dorothy Lamour. He proposed marriage to Colby, but she rejected him, and he had a brief affair with Joan Fontaine.

=== War career as pilot (1941–1946) ===
A licensed civilian pilot, Stewart enlisted in the US Army Air Forces early in 1941, undertaking military flight training and becoming a commissioned officer and USAAF pilot. In January 1944 in the rank of captain, he was assigned to the 453rd Bombardment Group, 2nd Combat Bombardment Wing, Eighth Air Force operating from East Anglia, England as a bomber pilot flying the B-24 Liberator. After seeing action in Europe during World War II, he attained the rank of colonel and received several awards for his service.

He remained in the Army Air Forces Reserve after the end of the war, which became the Air Force Reserve when the US Air Force became an independent service in 1947. He was promoted to the rank of brigadier general in the Air Force Reserve in 1959. He retired from the service in 1968, at which time he was awarded the Air Force Distinguished Service Medal. (Note: There are several claims that President Ronald Reagan promoted Stewart to the honorary rank of major general in May 1985 at the same time as awarding his Medal of Freedom, but this is unsupported by evidence, as there was no legislative authorization for such a promotion, the record of the Medal of Freedom presentation at the Reagan Library contains no mention of a promotion and the video of the presentation contains no promotion.) President Reagan recounted at a White House briefing that he was corrected by Stewart after Reagan incorrectly announced he was a major general at a campaign event.

=== Marriage and children ===
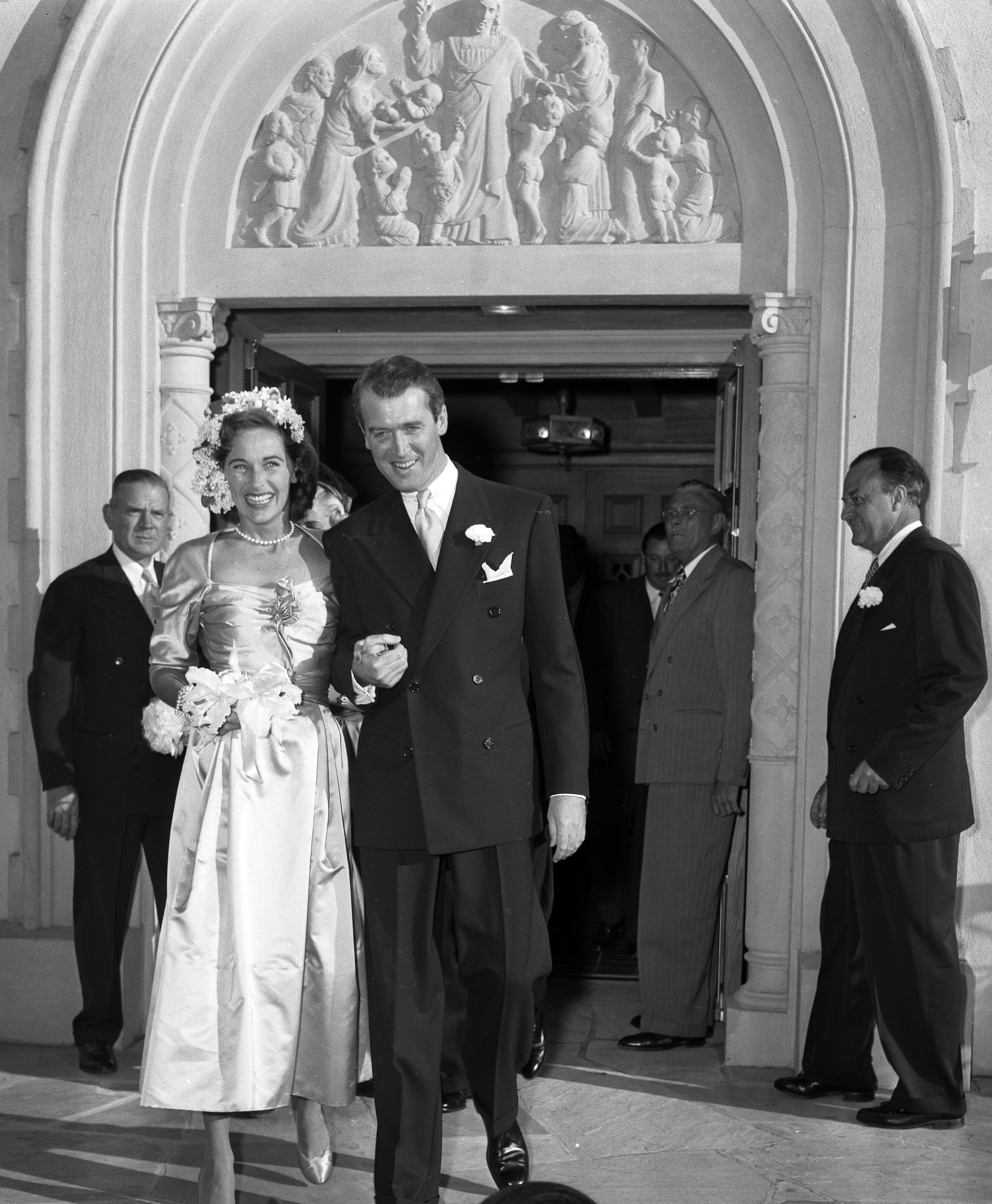
Stewart and Gloria Hatrick McLean after their wedding ceremony, 1949

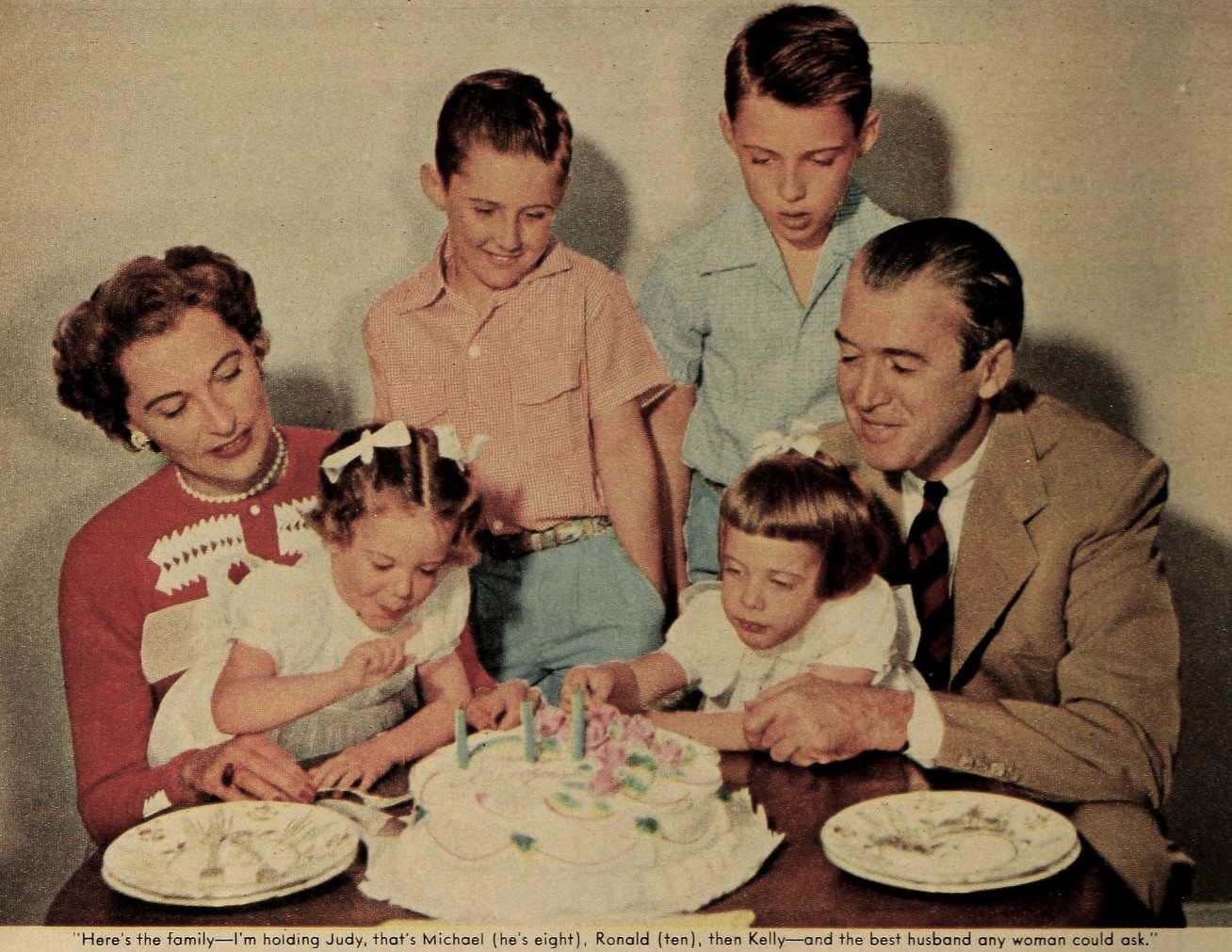
Stewart and Gloria with their children, 1954

In 1942, while serving in the military, Stewart met singer Dinah Shore at the Hollywood Canteen, a club primarily for servicemen. They began a romantic relationship and planned to marry in Las Vegas in 1943, but Stewart called off the wedding before they arrived, citing cold feet. After the war, Stewart began a relationship with Myrna Dell while filming The Stratton Story (1949). Although gossip columnists claimed that they were planning to marry, Dell denied these reports.

Stewart first met his future wife, Gloria Hatrick McLean, at Keenan Wynn's Christmas party in 1947. He had crashed the party and was intoxicated, making a poor first impression on Hatrick. A year later, Gary Cooper and his wife, Veronica, invited Hatrick and Stewart to a dinner party, and the two began dating. A former model, Hatrick was a divorced mother of two. Stewart and Hatrick married at Brentwood Presbyterian Church on August 9, 1949, and remained married until her death from lung cancer in 1994.

The couple purchased a home in Beverly Hills in 1951, where they lived for the remainder of their lives. They also owned the Winecup Gamble Ranch in Nevada from 1953 to 1957. Stewart adopted Hatrick's two sons, Ronald (1944–1969) and Michael (born 1946). The couple had twin daughters, Judy and Kelly, on May 7, 1951. Ronald was killed in action in Vietnam on June 8, 1969, while serving as a first lieutenant in the Marine Corps, at the age of 24.

=== Friendships, interests, and character ===
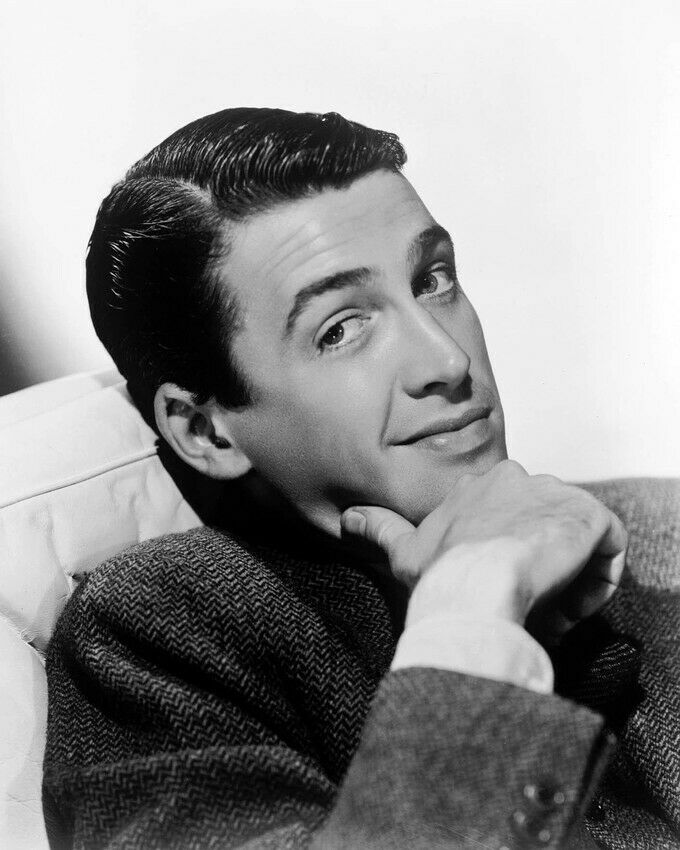
Stewart in the 1930s

Stewart was guarded about his personal life and, according to biographer Scott Eyman, tended in interviews to avoid the emotional connection he was known for in his films, preferring to keep his thoughts and feelings to himself. He was known as a loner who did not have intimate relationships with many people. Director John Ford said of Stewart, "You don't get to know Jimmy Stewart; Jimmy Stewart gets to know you."

Stewart's 50-year friendship with Henry Fonda began in Manhattan when Fonda invited Stewart to be his third roommate (in addition to Joshua Logan and Myron McCormick) to make the rent. When Stewart moved to Hollywood in 1935, he again shared an apartment with Fonda, and the two gained reputations as playboys. Over their careers, they starred in four films together: On Our Merry Way (1948), How the West Was Won (1962), Firecreek (1968), and The Cheyenne Social Club (1970).

Both Stewart's and Fonda's children later noted that their fathers' favorite activity when not working seemed to be quietly sharing time together while building and painting model airplanes, a hobby they had taken up in New York years earlier. Besides building model airplanes, Stewart and Fonda liked to build and fly kites, play golf, and reminisce about the "old days". After Fonda's death in 1982, Stewart's only public comment was "I've just lost my best friend." Their friendship was chronicled in Scott Eyman's biography, Hank and Jim (2017).

Aside from Fonda, Stewart's close friends included his former agent, Leland Hayward; director John Ford; photographer John Swope, Stewart's former roommate; and Billy Grady, the talent scout who discovered Stewart and also served as the best man at his wedding. Gary Cooper was another close friend of Stewart's. On April 17, 1961, Cooper was too ill with cancer to attend the 33rd Academy Awards ceremony, so Stewart accepted the honorary Oscar on his behalf. (Note: Stewart's emotional speech hinted that something was seriously wrong, and the next day newspapers ran the headline, "Gary Cooper has cancer." One month later, on May 13, 1961, six days after his 60th birthday, Cooper died.)

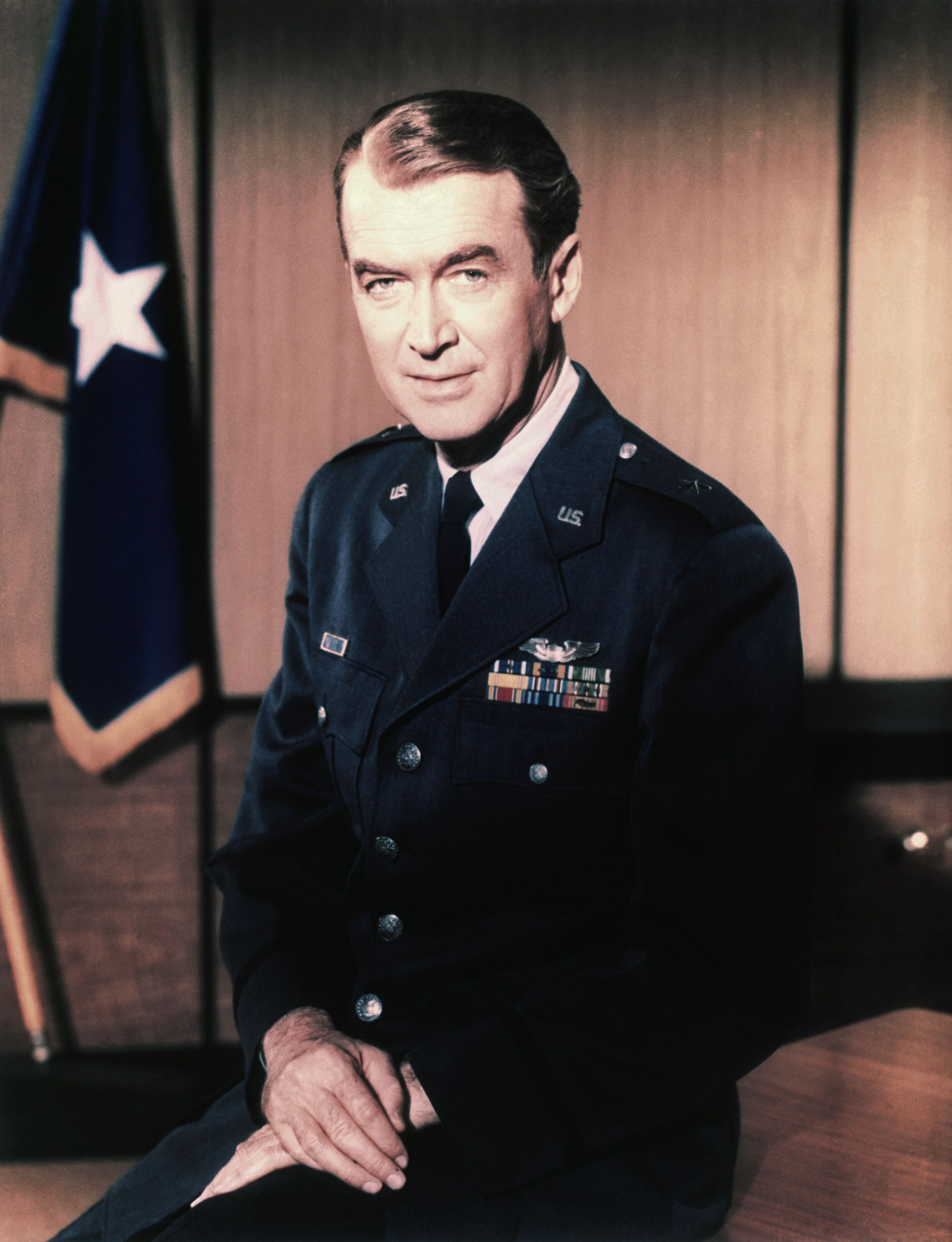
Brigadier General James Stewart, 1968

In addition to his film career, Stewart had diversified investments, including real estate, oil wells, the charter-plane company Southwest Airways, and membership on major corporate boards; he became a multimillionaire. Already prior to his enlistment in the Air Corps, he had been an avid pilot, with a private pilot certificate and a commercial pilot license, as well as over 400 hours of flying time. A highly proficient pilot, he entered a cross-country race with Leland Hayward in 1937 and was one of the early investors in Thunderbird Field, a pilot-training school built and operated by Southwest Airways in Glendale, Arizona.

Stewart was also active in philanthropy over the years. He served as the national vice-chairman of entertainment for the American Red Cross's fund-raising campaign for wounded soldiers in Vietnam, as well as contributed donations for improvements and restorations to Indiana, his hometown in Pennsylvania. His signature charity event, "The Jimmy Stewart Relay Marathon Race", held annually since 1982, has raised millions of dollars for the Child and Family Development Center at St. John's Health Center in Santa Monica, California.

Stewart was a lifelong supporter of scouting, having been a Second Class Scout as a youth and being awarded the Silver Buffalo Award for service to youth in 1958. He was also an adult Scout leader, and in the 1970s and 1980s, he made advertisements for the Boy Scouts of America, which led to his being incorrectly identified as an Eagle Scout. An award for Boy Scouts, "The James M. Stewart Good Citizenship Award" has been presented since 2003. Stewart was also a Life Member of the Sons of the Revolution in California.

=== Political views ===
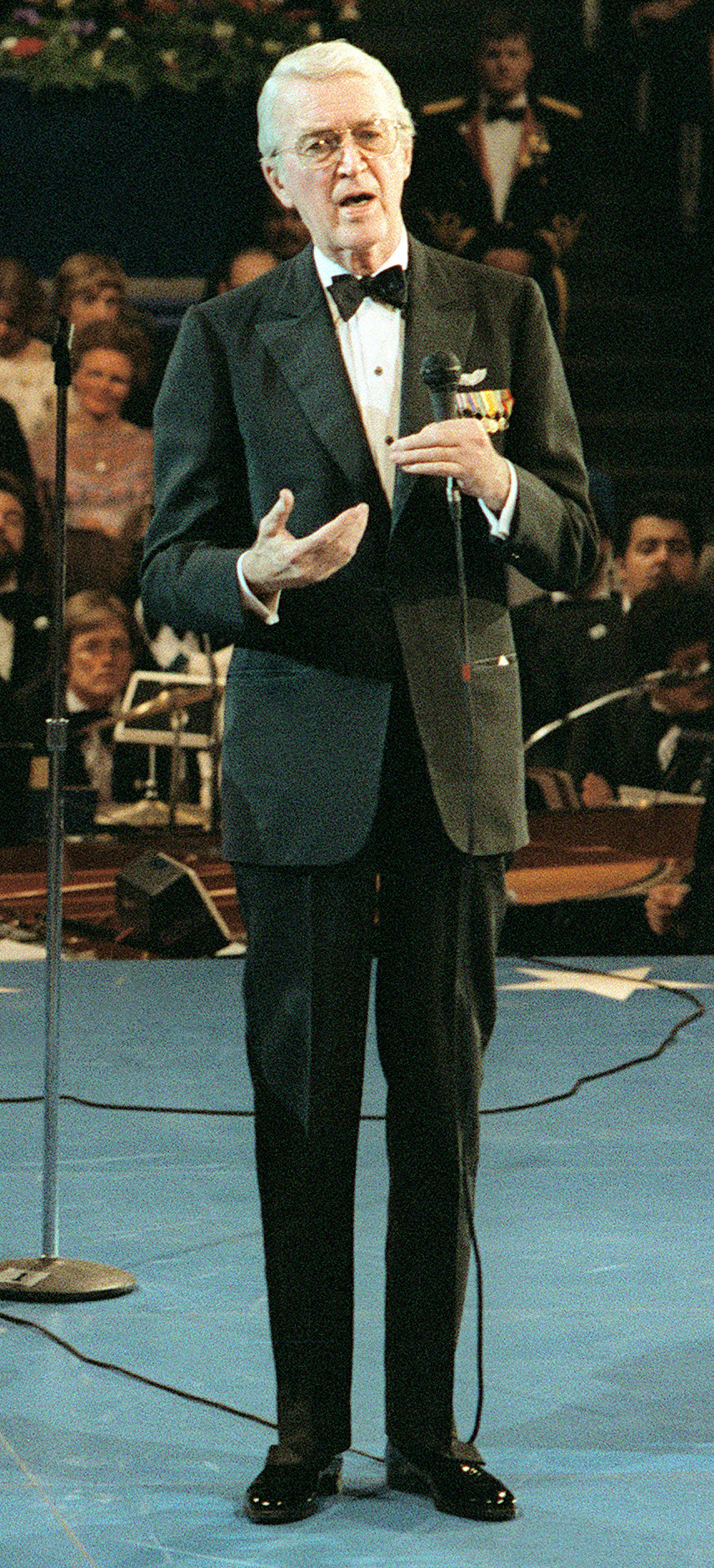
Speaking at The Kennedy Center on Inauguration Day, 1981, in Washington D.C.

Stewart was a staunch conservative Republican throughout his life. A political argument in 1947 reportedly led to a fistfight with friend Henry Fonda (a liberal Democrat), according to some accounts, but the two maintained their friendship by never discussing politics again. The fistfight may be apocryphal, as Jhan Robbins quotes Stewart as saying, "Our views never interfered with our feelings for each other. We just didn't talk about certain things. I can't remember ever having an argument with him—ever!"

In 1964, Stewart campaigned for the conservative presidential candidate Barry Goldwater and, according to biographer Marc Eliot, erred on the obsessive prior to the election. Stewart was a hawk on the Vietnam War and maintained that his son, Ronald, did not die in vain. Following the assassination of Senator Robert F. Kennedy in 1968, Stewart, Charlton Heston, Kirk Douglas, and Gregory Peck issued a statement calling for support of President Lyndon B. Johnson's Gun Control Act of 1968.

Stewart actively supported Ronald Reagan's bid for the Republican presidential nomination in 1976. He attended Reagan's campaign rallies, in one speech assuring that he was more conservative than ever, regardless of the death of his son in the Vietnam War. In the last years of his life, he supported the re-election of Jesse Helms to the Senate in 1990 and also donated to the campaign of Bob Dole for the 1996 presidential election.

In 1988, Stewart made a plea in Congressional hearings, along with Burt Lancaster, Katharine Hepburn, Ginger Rogers, film director Martin Scorsese, and many others, against Ted Turner's decision to 'colorize' classic black-and-white films, including It's a Wonderful Life. Stewart stated, "the coloring of black-and-white films is wrong. It's morally and artistically wrong and these profiteers should leave our film industry alone."

In 1989, Stewart founded the American Spirit Foundation to apply entertainment-industry resources to developing innovative approaches to public education and to assist the emerging democracy movements in the former Iron Curtain countries.

== Later life ==
Stewart's wife Gloria died of lung cancer on February 16, 1994, aged 75. According to biographer Donald Dewey, her death left Stewart depressed and "lost at sea". Stewart became even more reclusive, spending most of his time in his bedroom, exiting only to eat and visit with his children. He shut out most people from his life, not only media and fans, but also his co-stars and friends. His friends Leonard Gershe and Gregory Peck said Stewart was not depressed or unhappy, but finally allowed to rest and be alone.

Stewart was hospitalized after falling in December 1995. In December 1996, he was due to have the battery in his pacemaker changed but opted not to have it done.

== Death ==
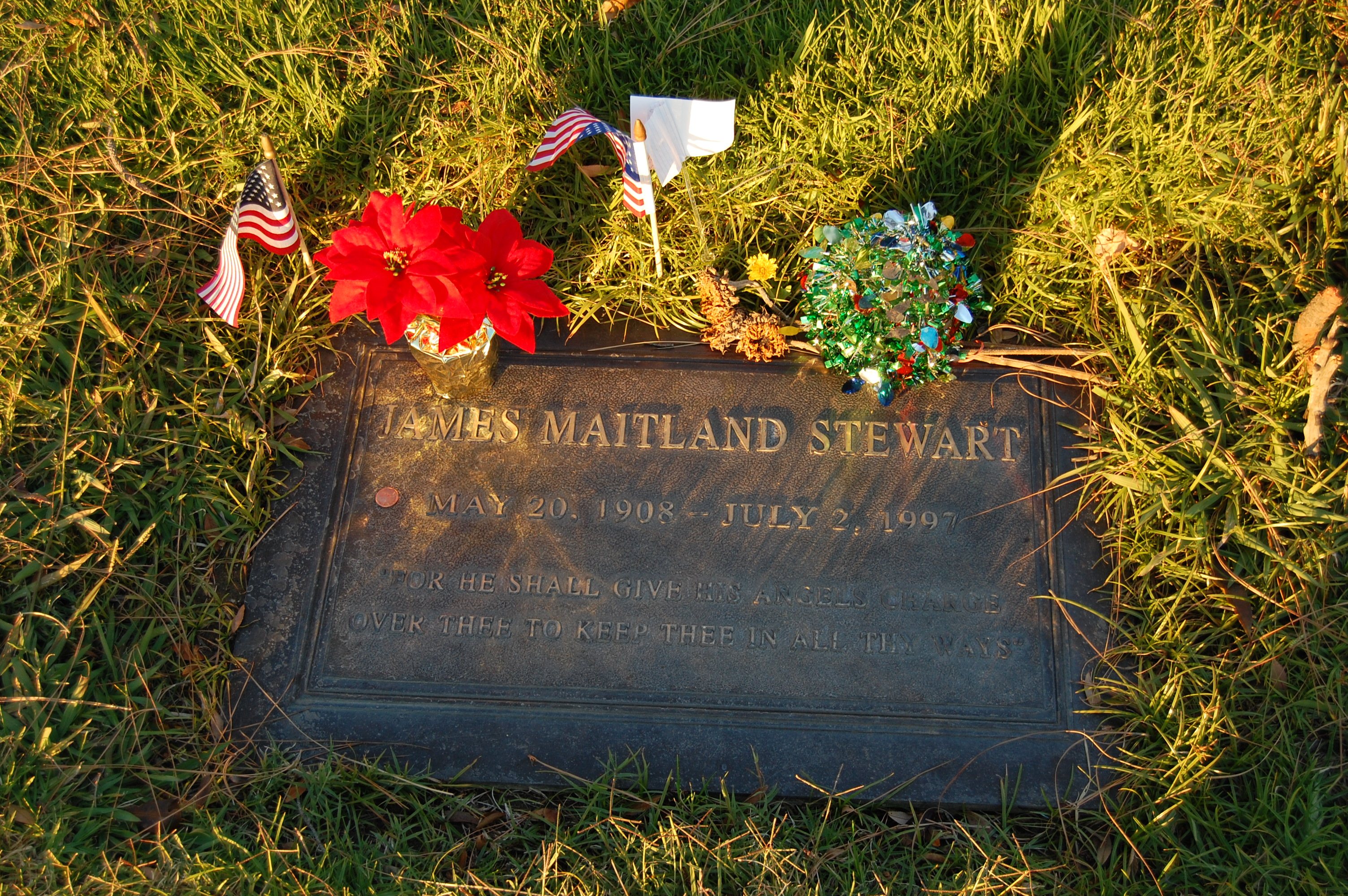
Stewart's grave

In February 1997, Stewart was hospitalized for an irregular heartbeat. On June 25, a thrombosis formed in his right leg, leading to a pulmonary embolism one week later. Stewart died of a heart attack caused by the embolism at the age of 89, surrounded by his children at his home in Beverly Hills, on July 2, 1997. President Bill Clinton commented that America had lost a "national treasure ... a great actor, a gentleman and a patriot".

He was buried at Forest Lawn Memorial Park in Glendale, California in a private funeral with full military honors and a three-volley salute performed. More than 3,000 mourners later attended his memorial service, including June Allyson, Carol Burnett, Bob Hope, Lew Wasserman, Nancy Reagan, Esther Williams, and Robert Stack.

== Acting style and screen persona ==
He had the ability to talk naturally. He knew that in conversations people do often interrupt one another and it's not always so easy to get a thought out. It took a little time for the sound men to get used to him, but he had an enormous impact. And then, some years later, Marlon came out and did the same thing all over again—but what people forget is that Jimmy did it first.

— Cary Grant on Stewart's acting technique.

According to biographer Scott Eyman, Stewart was an instinctive actor. He was natural and at ease in front of the camera, despite his shy off-screen personality. In line with his natural and conversational acting style, Stewart's co-stars found him easy to work with, as he was willing to improvise around any situation that arose while filming. Later in his career, Stewart began to resent his reputation of having a "natural" acting technique. He asserted that there was not anything natural about standing on a sound stage in front of lights and cameras while acting out a scene.

Stewart had established early in his career that he was proficient at communicating personality and character nuances through his performances alone. He used an "inside-out" acting technique, preferring to represent the character without accents, makeup, and props. Additionally, he tended to act with his body, not only with his voice and face; for example, in Harvey, Stewart portrays the main character's age and loneliness by slightly hunching down. He was also known for his pauses that had the ability to hold the audience's attention. Film critic Geoffrey O'Brien related that Stewart's "stammering pauses" created anxious space for the audience, leaving them in anticipation for the scene which Stewart took his time leading up to.

Sample from The Man From Laramie trailer (1955) showcasing Stewart's recognizable drawl

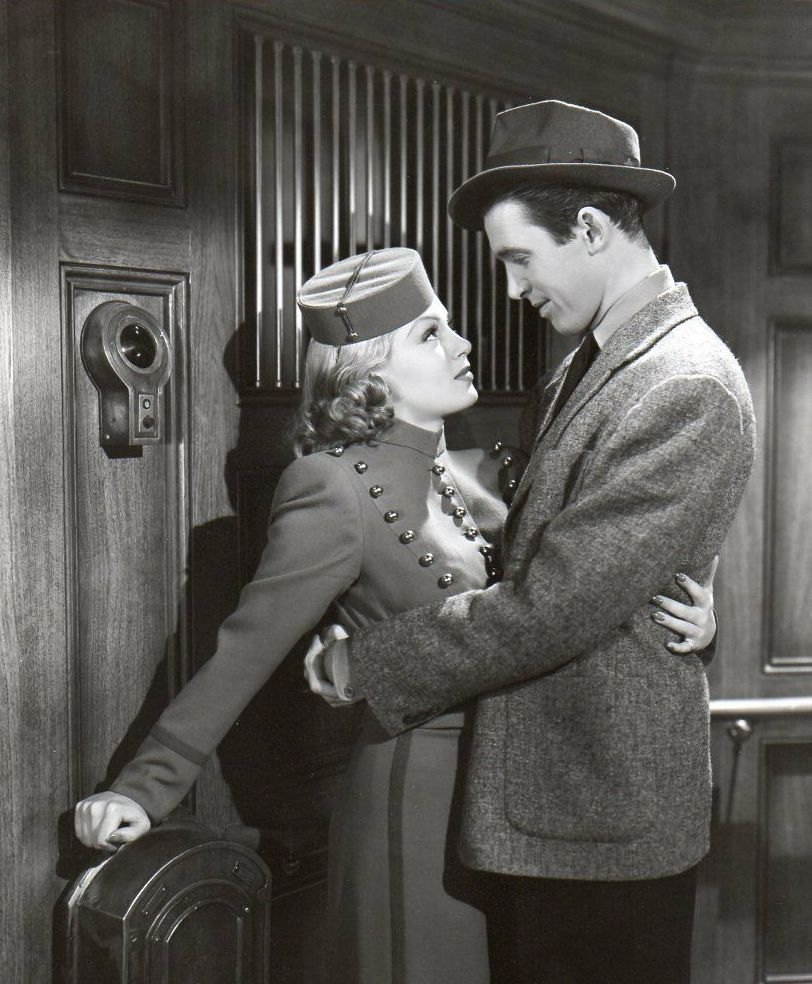
Lana Turner and Stewart in Ziegfeld Girl (1941)

Stewart himself claimed to dislike his earlier film performances, saying he was "all hands and feet", adding that he "didn't seem to know what to do with either". He mentioned that even though he did not always like his performances, he would not get discouraged. He said, "But I always tried, and if the script wasn't too good, well, then, I just tried a little bit harder. I hope, though, not so hard that it shows." Former co-star Kim Novak stated of his acting style that for emotional scenes, he would access emotions deep inside of him and would take time to wind down after the scene ended. He could not turn it off immediately after the director yelled cut.

Stewart was particularly adept at performing vulnerable scenes with women. Jack Lemmon suggested that Stewart's talent for performing with women was that he was able to allow the audience to see the respect and gentility he felt toward the women through his eyes. He showed that his characters needed them as much as their characters needed him. In connection to Stewart's screen persona with women, Peter Bradshaw said The Philadelphia Story is "a film every school pupil should see" due to Stewart's character's clear explanation of sexual consent after being accused of taking advantage of the main female character.

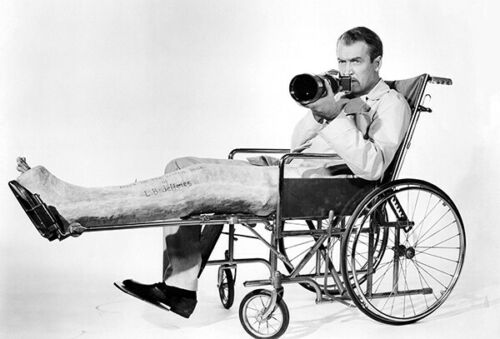
Stewart as news photographer Jeffries in Rear Window (1954)

Stewart's screen persona was that of an "everyman", an ordinary man placed in extraordinary circumstances. Audiences could identify with him, in contrast to other Hollywood leading men of the time, such as Cary Grant, who represented what the audience wanted to become. Stewart's screen persona has been compared to those of Gary Cooper and Tom Hanks. Eyman suggested that Stewart could portray several different characters: "the brother, the sweetheart, [and] the nice guy next door with a bias toward doing the right thing: always decent but never a pushover".

In Stewart's early career, Louella Parsons described his "boyish appeal" and "ability to win audience sympathy" as the reasons for his success as an actor; Stewart's performances appealed to both young and old audiences. According to film scholar Dennis Bingham, Stewart's essential persona was "a small-town friendly neighbor, with a gentle face and voice and a slim body that is at once graceful and awkward". Unlike many actors who developed their on-screen persona over time, Stewart's on-screen persona was recognizable as early as Art Trouble (1934), his uncredited debut film role, where Stewart was relaxed and comfortable on screen. He portrayed this persona most strongly in the 1940s, but maintained a classic everyman persona throughout his career.

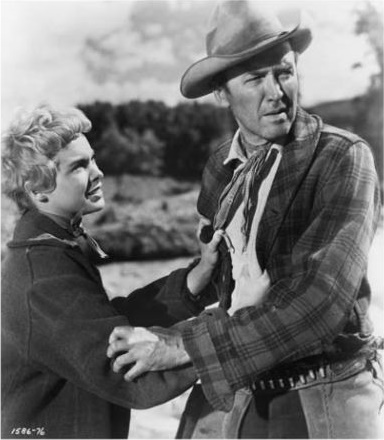
Janet Leigh and Stewart in Anthony Mann's The Naked Spur (1953)

Film scholar Dennis Bingham wrote that Stewart was "both a 'personality' star and a chameleon" who evoked both masculine and feminine qualities. Consequently, it was difficult for filmmakers to sell Stewart as the stereotypical leading man, and thus he "became a star in films that capitalized on his sexual ambivalence". Stewart's asexual persona as a leading man was unusual for the time period for an actor who was not mainly a comedian. However, during his career "Stewart [encompassed] the furthest extremes of American masculinity, from Reaganite militarist patriotism to Hitchcockian perversity".

According to Roger Ebert, Stewart's pre–World War II characters were usually likable, but in postwar years directors chose to cast Stewart in darker roles, such as Jeffries in Rear Window. Ebert put this into contemporary perspective by asking, "What would it feel like to see [Tom Hanks] in a bizarre and twisted light?", explaining that it is jarring to see a beloved everyman persona such as Stewart in dark roles. Jonathan Rosenbaum explained that since audiences were more interested in Stewart's "star persona" and "aura" than his characters, "this makes it more striking when Anthony Mann and Alfred Hitchcock periodically explore the neurotic and obsessive aspects of Stewart's persona to play against his all-American innocence and earnestness."

Film scholar John Belton argued that rather than playing characters in his films, Stewart often played his own screen persona. He had difficulty playing famous historical personages because his persona could not accommodate the historical character. Belton explained that "James Stewart is more James Stewart than Glenn Miller in The Glenn Miller Story (1954) or Charles Lindbergh in The Spirit of St. Louis (1957)." Jonathan Rosenbaum continued that Stewart's "pre-existing life-size persona" in Winchester '73 "helped to shape and determine the impact of [his character] in [this film]".

Stewart has been described as a character actor who went through several distinct career phases. According to film scholar Amy Lawrence, the main elements of Stewart's persona, "a propensity for physical and spiritual suffering, lingering fears of inadequacy", were established by Frank Capra in the 1930s and were enhanced through his later work with Hitchcock and Mann. John Belton explained that "James Stewart evolves from the naive, small-town, populist hero of Frank Capra's 1930s comedies to the bitter, anxiety-ridden, vengeance-obsessed cowboy in Anthony Mann's 1950s Westerns and the disturbed voyeur and sexual fetishist in Alfred Hitchcock's 1950s suspense thrillers."

During his postwar career, Stewart usually avoided appearing in comedies, Harvey and Take Her, She's Mine being exceptions. He played many different types of characters, including manipulative, cynical, obsessive, or crazy characters. Stewart found that acting allowed him to express the fear and anxiety that he could not express during the war; his post-war performances were received well by audiences because they could still see the innocent, pre-war Stewart underneath his dark roles. According to Andrew Sarris, Stewart was "the most complete actor-personality in the American cinema".

== Work ==
=== Filmography ===
Selected credits

- Art Trouble (1934) (first film role; a short—uncredited)
- The Murder Man (1935)
- After the Thin Man (1936)
- Important News (1936)
- Small Town Girl (1936)
- The Gorgeous Hussy (1936)
- Wife vs. Secretary (1936)
- Rose-Marie (1936)
- Next Time We Love (1936)
- Born to Dance (1936)
- Speed (1936)
- Navy Blue and Gold (1937)
- The Last Gangster (1937)
- Seventh Heaven (1937)
- Of Human Hearts (1938)
- The Shopworn Angel (1938)
- You Can't Take It with You (1938)
- Vivacious Lady (1938)
- The Ice Follies of 1939 (1939)
- Made for Each Other (1939)
- Mr. Smith Goes to Washington (1939)
- It's a Wonderful World (1939)
- Destry Rides Again (1939)
- The Shop Around the Corner (1940)
- No Time for Comedy (1940)
- The Mortal Storm (1940)
- The Philadelphia Story (1940)
- Ziegfeld Girl (1941)
- Come Live with Me (1941)
- Pot of Gold (1941)
- Winning Your Wings (1942) (Army Air Corps Recruitment Short)
- It's a Wonderful Life (1946)
- Magic Town (1947)
- You Gotta Stay Happy (1948)
- Rope (1948)
- Call Northside 777 (1948)
- On Our Merry Way (1948)
- Malaya (1949)
- Winchester '73 (1950)
- Harvey (1950)
- Broken Arrow (1950)
- The Jackpot (1950)
- No Highway in the Sky (1951)
- The Greatest Show on Earth (1952)
- Carbine Williams (1952)
- Bend of the River (1952)
- The Naked Spur (1953)
- Thunder Bay (1953)
- The Glenn Miller Story (1954)
- Rear Window (1954)
- The Far Country (1954)
- The Man from Laramie (1955)
- Strategic Air Command (1955)
- The Man Who Knew Too Much (1956)
- The Spirit of St. Louis (1957)
- Night Passage (1957)
- Vertigo (1958)
- Bell, Book and Candle (1958)
- The FBI Story (1959)
- Anatomy of a Murder (1959)
- The Mountain Road (1960)
- Two Rode Together (1961)
- The Man Who Shot Liberty Valance (1962)
- How the West Was Won (1962)
- Mr. Hobbs Takes a Vacation (1962)
- Take Her, She's Mine (1962)
- Cheyenne Autumn (1964)
- Shenandoah (1965)
- The Flight of the Phoenix (1965)
- Dear Brigitte (1965)
- The Rare Breed (1966)
- Firecreek (1968)
- Bandolero! (1968)
- The Cheyenne Social Club (1970)
- Fools' Parade (1971)
- The Shootist (1976)
- Airport '77 (1977)
- The Magic of Lassie (1978)
- The Big Sleep (1978)
- Mr. Krueger's Christmas (1980)
- A Tale of Africa (1980)
- Right of Way (1983)
- An American Tail: Fievel Goes West (1991)

=== Theatre ===
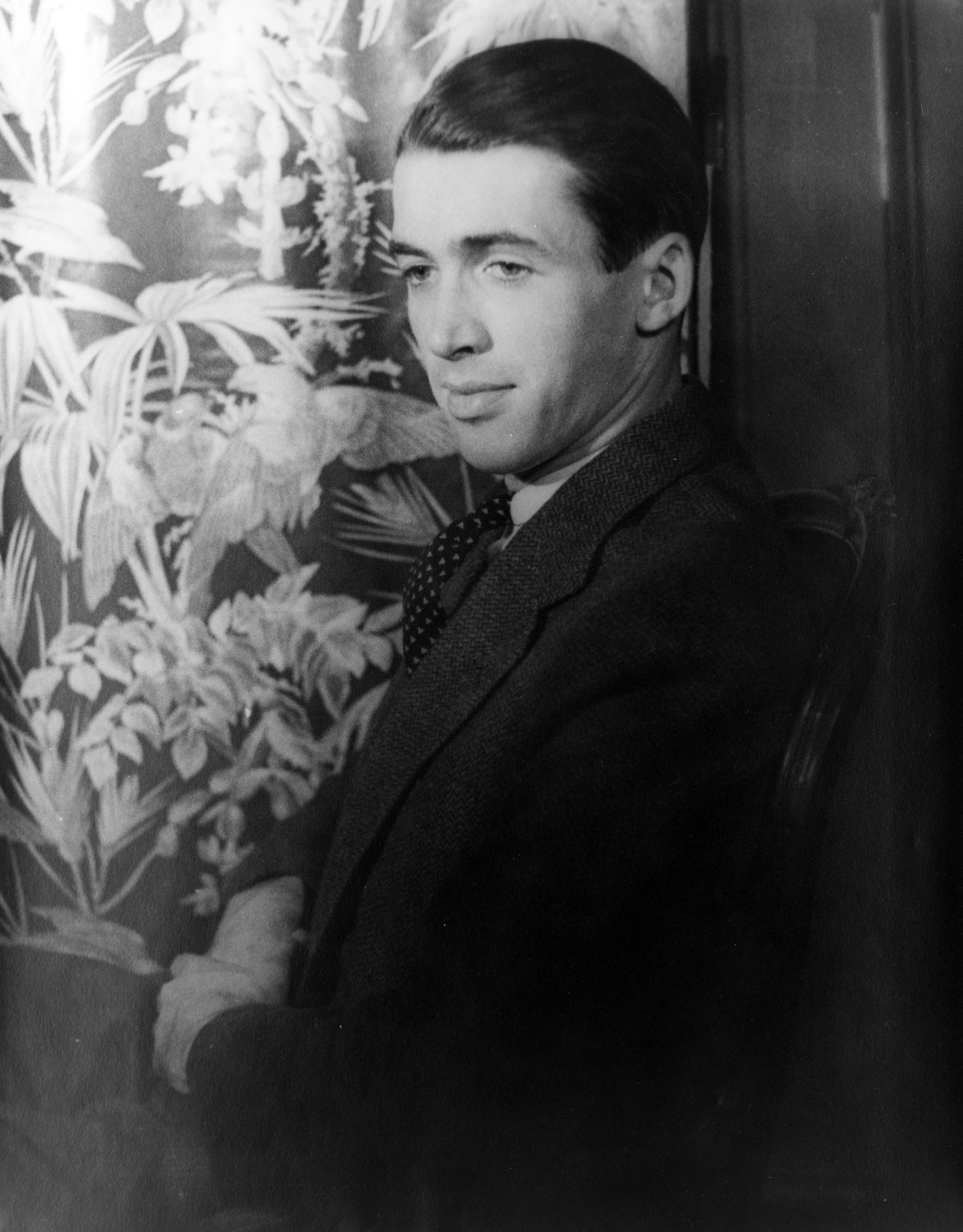
1931 portrait

Year	Production	Role	Venue	Ref.
1932	Carry Nation	Constable Gano	Biltmore Theatre, Broadway	
1932–1933	Goodbye Again	Chauffeur	Theatre Masque, Broadway	
1933	Spring in Autumn	Jack Brennan	Henry Miller's Theatre, Broadway	
1934	All Good Americans	Johnny Chadwick	Henry Miller's Theatre, Broadway	
1934	Yellow Jack	Sgt. John O'Hara	Martin Beck Theatre, Broadway	
1934	Divided By Three	Teddy Parrish	Ethel Barrymore Theatre, Broadway	
1934–1935	Page Miss Glory	Ed Olsen	Mansfield Theatre, Broadway	
1935	A Journey By Night	Carl	Shubert Theatre, Broadway	
1947	Harvey	Elwood P. Dowd	48th Street Theatre, Broadway	(Note: The reference does not mention the second set of dates, or that Frank Fay created the role.)
1970	Harvey	Elwood P. Dowd	ANTA Theatre, Broadway	
1975	A Gala Tribute to Joshua Logan	Himself	Imperial Theatre, Broadway	

=== Radio ===
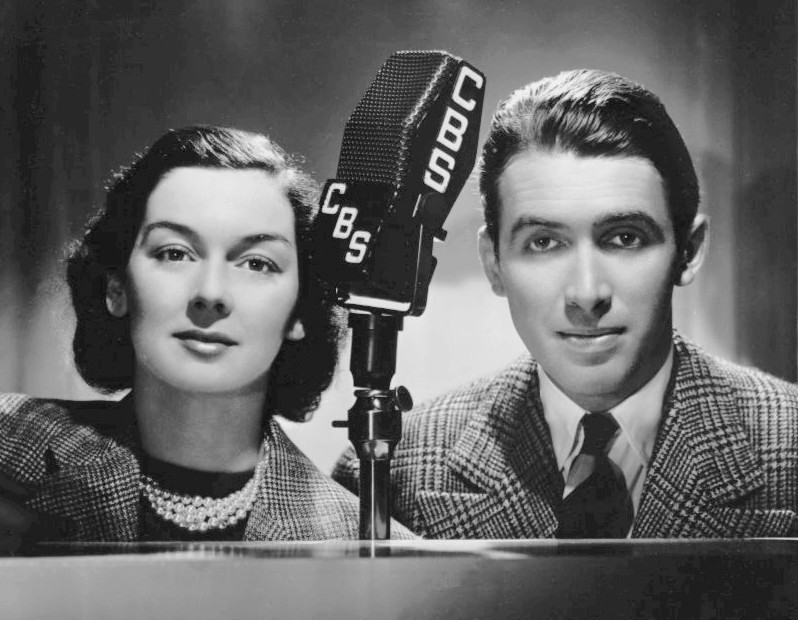
Rosalind Russell and Stewart at CBS Radio in 1937

Year	Program	Episode	Reference
June 14, 1937	Lux Radio Theatre	Madame X	
1937	Good News of 1938	As himself	
October 23, 1938	The Silver Theater	Up From Darkness	
January 22, 1939	The Silver Theater	Misty Mountain: Part One	
January 29, 1939	The Silver Theater	Misty Mountain: Part Two	
March 12, 1939	The Screen Guild Theater	Tailored By Toni	
November 5, 1939	The Gulf Screen Guild Theater	Going My Way	
February 11, 1940	The Gulf Screen Guild Theater	Single Crossing	
September 29, 1940	Screen Guild Players	The Shop Around the Corner	
July 20, 1942	Victory Theater	The Philadelphia Story	
November 10, 1945	Lux Radio Theatre	Destry Rides Again	
November 20, 1945	Theater of Romance	No Time for Comedy	
February 21, 1946	Suspense	Consequence	
February 13, 1947	Family Theater	Flight From Home	
March 10, 1947	Lux Radio Theatre	It's A Wonderful Life	
March 17, 1947	The Screen Guild Theater	The Philadelphia Story	
December 15, 1947	Lux Radio Theatre	Magic Town	
March 18, 1948	Reader's Digest Radio Edition	One Way to Broadway	
January 17, 1949	Lux Radio Theatre	You Gotta Stay Happy	
December 1, 1949	Suspense	Mission Completed	
August 29, 1949	Lux Radio Theatre	June Bride	
December 9, 1949	Screen Directors Playhouse	Call Northside 777	
January 6, 1950	Screen Directors Playhouse	Magic Town	
February 13, 1950	Lux Radio Theatre	The Stratton Story	
February 26, 1951	Lux Radio Theatre	When Johnny Comes Marching Home	
March 29, 1951	Screen Directors Playhouse	Next Time We Love	
April 26, 1951	Screen Directors Playhouse	The Jackpot	
September 7, 1951	Screen Directors Playhouse	Broken Arrow	
November 12, 1951	Lux Radio Theatre	Winchester '73	
April 28, 1952	Lux Radio Theatre	No Highway in the Sky	
March 1, 1953	Theatre Guild on the Air	O'Halloran's Luck	
September 20, 1953 – June 24, 1954	The Six Shooter	Starred as Britt Ponset	

== Legacy ==
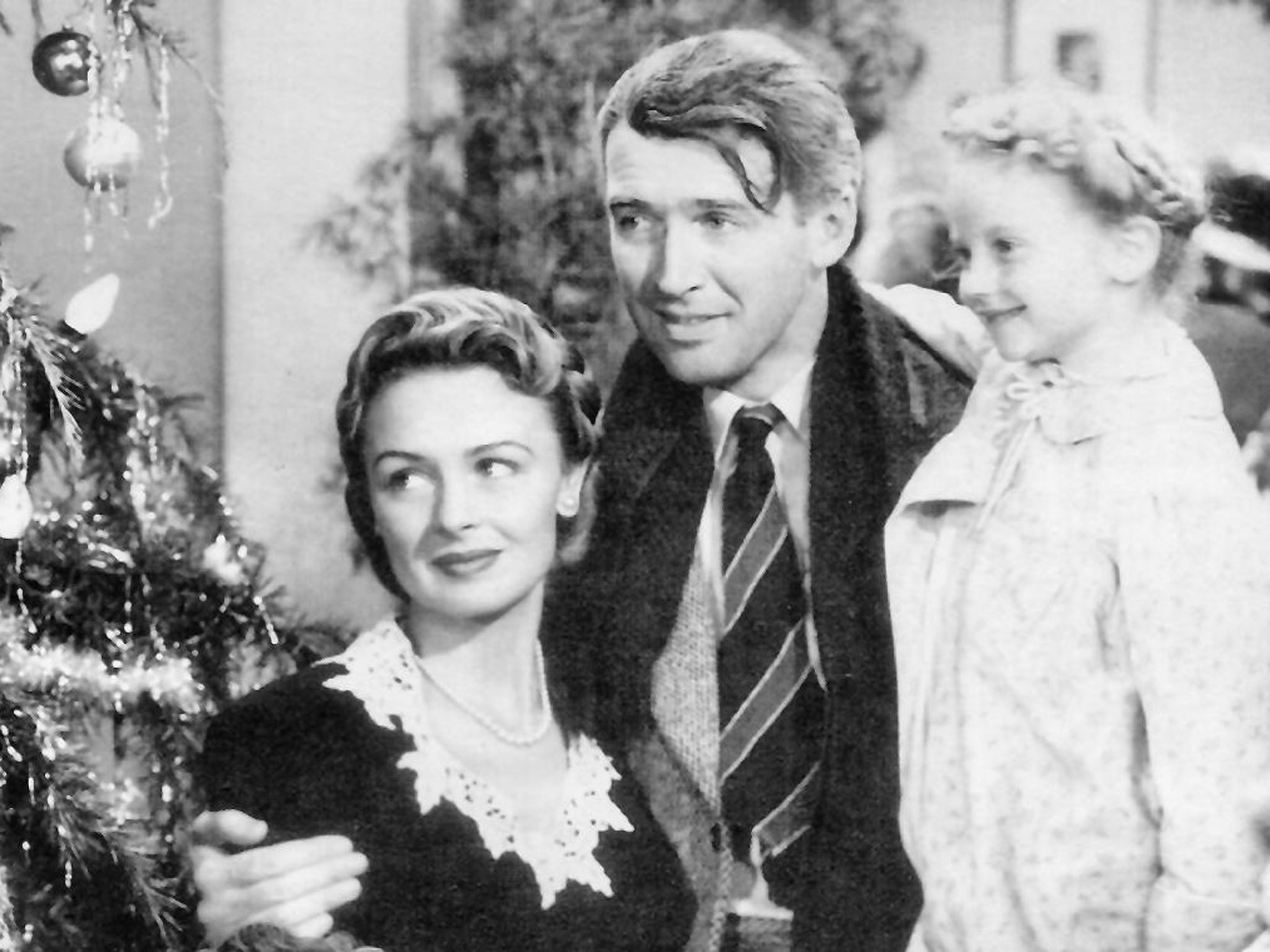
Stewart, Donna Reed and Karolyn Grimes in It's a Wonderful Life (1946)

Stewart is remembered for portraying idealist "everyman" characters in his films. His heroism on screen and devotion to his family made him relatable and representative of the American ideal, leading Stewart to be considered one of the best-loved figures in twentieth-century American popular culture. According to film scholar Dennis Bingham, "his ability to 'play'—even symbolize—honesty and 'American ideals' made him an icon into whose mold later male stars tried to pour themselves". Similarly, film scholar James Naremore has called Stewart "the most successful actor of the 'common man' in the history of movies" and "the most intensely-emotional leading man to emerge from the studio system", who could cry on screen without losing his masculinity.

David Thomson has explained Stewart's appeal by stating that "we wanted to be him, and we wanted to be liked by him", while Roger Ebert has stated that "whether he played everyman, or everyman's hidden psyche, Stewart was an innately likable man whose face, loping gait and distinctive drawl became famous all over the world". Among Stewart's most recognizable qualities was his manner of speaking with a hesitant drawl. According to film scholar Tim Palmer, "Stewart's legacy rests on his roles as the nervous idealist standing trial for, and gaining stature from, the sincerity of his beliefs, while his emotive convictions are put to the test." Film critic David Ansen wrote about Stewart's appeal as a person in addition to his appeal as an actor. Ansen retold a story in which Jack Warner, upon being told about Ronald Reagan's presidential ambitions, said, "No. Jimmy Stewart for president, Ronald Reagan for best friend." Ansen further explained that Stewart was the ultimate trustworthy movie star.

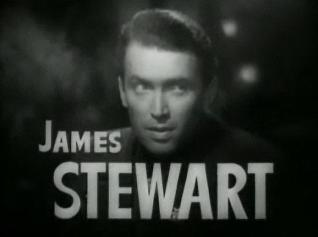
The Mortal Storm (1940)

In contrast to his popularly remembered "all-American" screen persona, film critics and scholars have tended to emphasize that his performances also showed a "dark side". According to film scholar Murray Pomerance, "the other Jimmy Stewart ... was a different type altogether, a repressed and neurotic man buried beneath an apparently calm facade, but ready at any moment to explode with vengeful anxiety and anger, or else with deeply twisted and constrained passions that could never match up with cheery personality of the alter ego."

Bingham has described him as having "two coequal personas; the earnest idealist, the nostalgic figure of the homespun boy next door; and the risk-taking actor who probably performed in films for more canonical auteurs than any other American star". According to him, it is this complexity and his ambiguous masculinity and sexuality with which he approached his roles that characterized his persona. Naremore has stated that there was a "troubled, cranky, slightly-repressed feeling in [Stewart's] behavior", and Thomson has written that it was his dark side that produced "great cinema".

Stewart was one of the most sought-after actors in 1950s Hollywood, proving that independent actors could be successful in the film industry, which led more actors in Hollywood to forego studio contracts. According to Bingham, Stewart marked "the transition between the studio period...and the era of free-lance actors, independent production, and powerful talent agents that made possible the "new kind of star" of the late 1960s". Although Stewart was not the first big-name freelance actor, his "mythic sweetness and idealism [which] were combined with eccentric physical equipment and capacity as an actor to enact emotion, anxiety, and pain" enabled him to succeed in both the studio system, which emphasized the star as a real person, and the skeptical post-studio era.

A number of Stewart's films have become classics of American cinema, with twelve of his films having been inducted into the United States National Film Registry as of 2019, and five—Mr. Smith Goes to Washington (1939), The Philadelphia Story (1940), It's a Wonderful Life (1946), Rear Window (1954), and Vertigo (1958)—being featured on the American Film Institute's list of the 100 greatest American films of all time. Stewart and Robert De Niro share the title for the most films represented on the AFI list. Stewart is also the most represented leading actor on the "100 Greatest Movies of All Time" list presented by Entertainment Weekly.

Two of his characters—Jefferson Smith in Mr. Smith Goes to Washington (1939) and George Bailey in It's a Wonderful Life (1946)—made AFI's list of the one hundred greatest heroes and villains. Harvey (1950) and The Philadelphia Story (1940) were included in their list of Greatest American Comedies. In 1999, the American Film Institute (AFI) ranked Stewart third on its list of the greatest American male actors.

=== Awards and honors ===
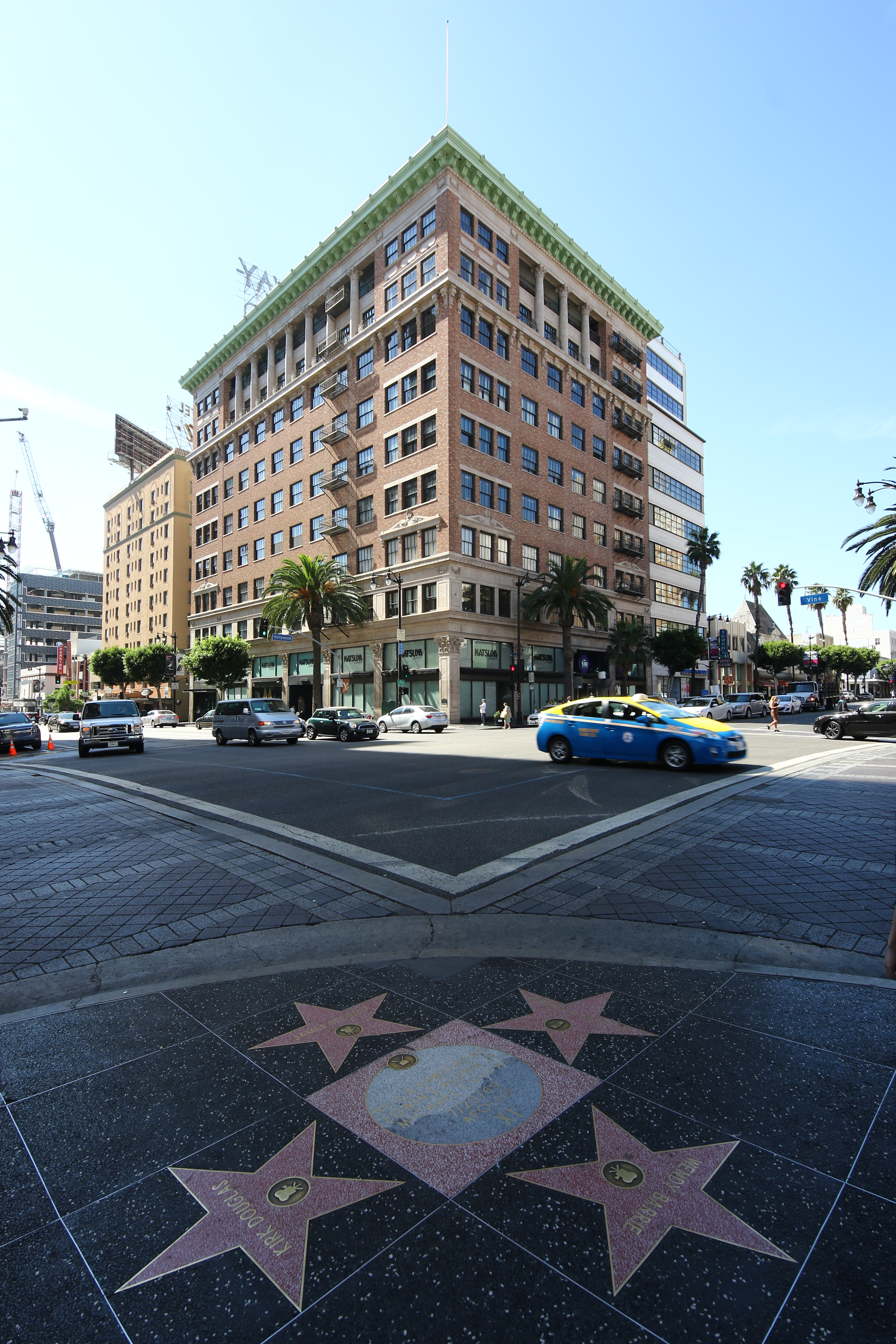
Hollywood Walk of Fame star at Hollywood and Vine (background Broadway Hollywood Building)

In 1960, Stewart was awarded a star on the Hollywood Walk of Fame at 1700 Vine Street for his contributions to the film industry. In 1974, he received the Golden Plate Award of the American Academy of Achievement. His Golden Plate was presented by Awards Council member Helen Hayes. In 1997, Princeton University, Stewart's alma mater, honored him with the dedication of the James M. Stewart Theater along with a retrospective of his films. Stewart has also been honored with his own postal stamp as part of the "Legends of Hollywood" stamp series.

In 1999, a bust of Stewart was unveiled at the Eighth Air Force Heritage Museum in Georgia. The L. Tom Perry Special Collections Library at Brigham Young University houses his personal papers and movie memorabilia including letters, scrapbooks, recordings of early radio programs, and two of his accordions. Stewart donated his papers and memorabilia to the library after becoming friends with the curator of its arts and communications collections, James D'Arc.

Year	Association	Category	Nominated work	Result	Ref.
1939	Academy Award	Best Actor	Mr. Smith Goes to Washington	Nominated	
1940	Academy Award	Best Actor	The Philadelphia Story	Won	
1946	Academy Award	Best Actor	It's a Wonderful Life	Nominated	
1951	Academy Award	Best Actor	Harvey	Nominated	
1959	Academy Award	Best Actor	Anatomy of a Murder	Nominated	
1984	Academy Award	Academy Honorary Award		Received	
1955	BAFTA Awards	Best Actor	The Glenn Miller Story	Nominated	
1960	BAFTA Awards	Best Actor	Anatomy of a Murder	Nominated	
1950	Golden Globe Award	Best Actor in a Motion Picture - Drama	Harvey	Nominated	
1962	Golden Globe Award	Best Actor in a Motion Picture - Comedy/Musical	Mr. Hobbs Takes a Vacation	Nominated	
1964	Golden Globe Award	Golden Globe Cecil B. DeMille Award		Received	
1973	Golden Globe Award	Best Actor in a Television Series - Drama	Hawkins	Won	
1939	New York Film Critics Circle Award	Best Actor	Mr. Smith Goes to Washington	Won	
1959	New York Film Critics Circle Award	Best Actor	Anatomy of a Murder	Won	
1959	Venice International Film Festival	Volpi Cup for Best Actor	Anatomy of a Murder	Won	

=== Memorials ===
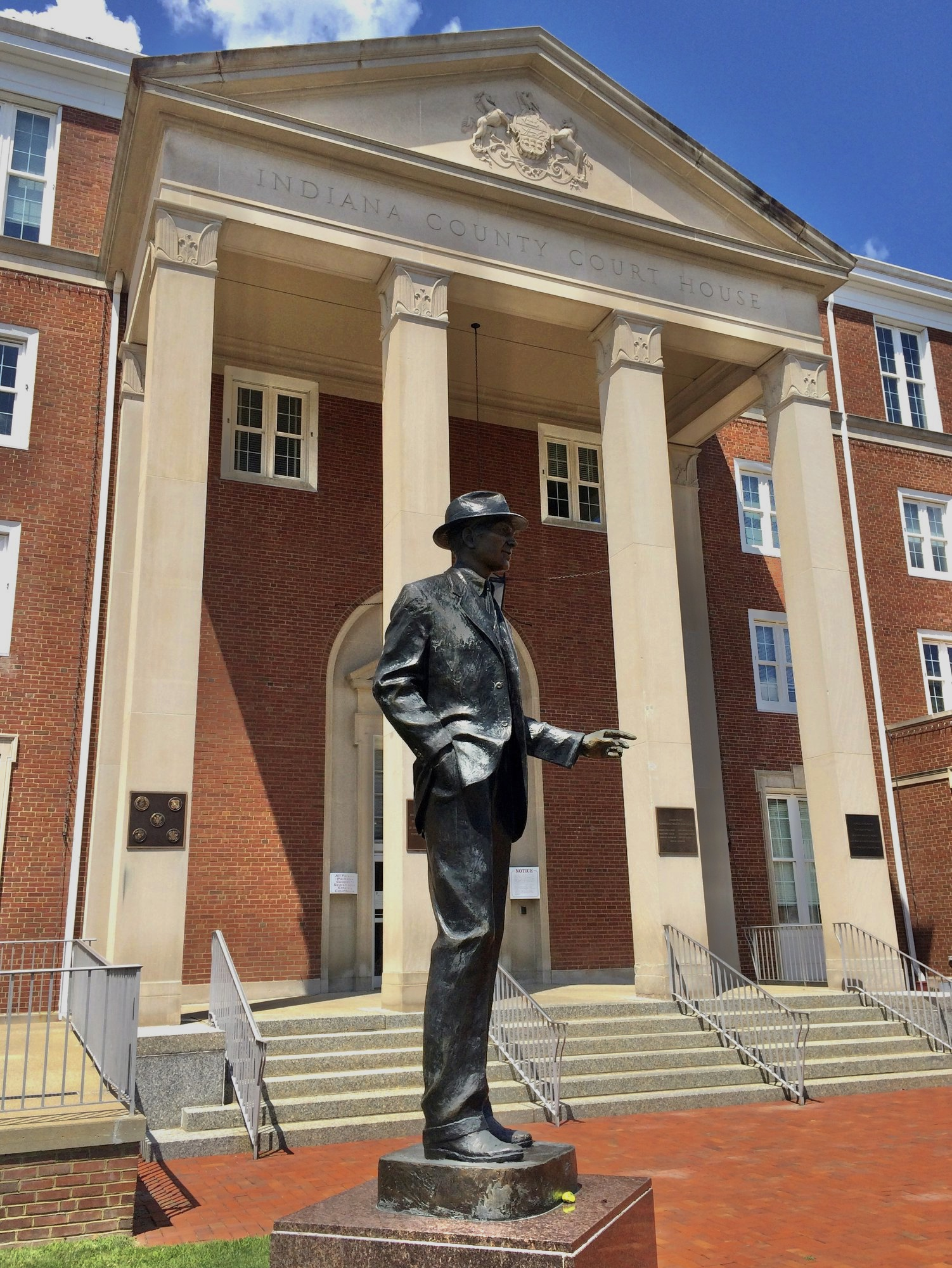
Stewart's statue in his hometown of Indiana, Pennsylvania

Stewart has several memorials in his childhood hometown, Indiana, Pennsylvania. On May 20, 1995, his 87th birthday, The Jimmy Stewart Museum was established. The museum is located near his birthplace, his childhood home, and the former location of his father's hardware store. The museum has six galleries that include photos, memorabilia, personal mementos, movie posters, props, scripts, costumes and much more. Stewart had contributed significant donations to his hometown, and had done it quietly as he didn't want the publicity. A large statue of Stewart stands on the lawn of the Indiana County Courthouse, and a plaque marks his birthplace.

In 1983, Jimmy Stewart came back to Indiana to celebrate his 75th birthday and unveiled the statue along with getting a phone call from then President Ronald Reagan to congratulate him on his birthday. 2011, the United States Post Office located at 47 South 7th Street in Indiana, Pennsylvania, was designated the "James M. 'Jimmy' Stewart Post Office Building". Additionally, the Indiana County–Jimmy Stewart Airport was named in his honor. His personal Cessna-310 airplane is refurbished and on display outside the airport that bears his name. His childhood home is still standing and overlooks his beloved hometown.

=== Documentary ===
- 2017: James Stewart/Robert Mitchum: The Two Faces of America directed by Gregory Monro

=== Biopic ===
In May 2026, Burns & Co. Entertainment released the official trailer for Jimmy, an American biographical drama film about James Stewart directed by Aaron Burns and written by Justin Strawhand. The film stars KJ Apa as Stewart and focuses on the actor’s rise in Hollywood, his military service during World War II, and his return to acting with It's a Wonderful Life. Supporting cast members include Jason Alexander, Max Casella, Sarah Drew, Neal McDonough and Rob Riggle. The film was released theatrically on November 6, 2026, by Fathom Entertainment.

== See also ==
- List of oldest and youngest Academy Awards winners and nominees — Youngest winners for Best Lead Actor
- List of actors with Academy Award nominations
- List of actors with more than one Academy Award nomination in the acting categories
- List of Golden Globe winners
