= List of awards and nominations received by James Stewart =

James Stewart awards and nominations
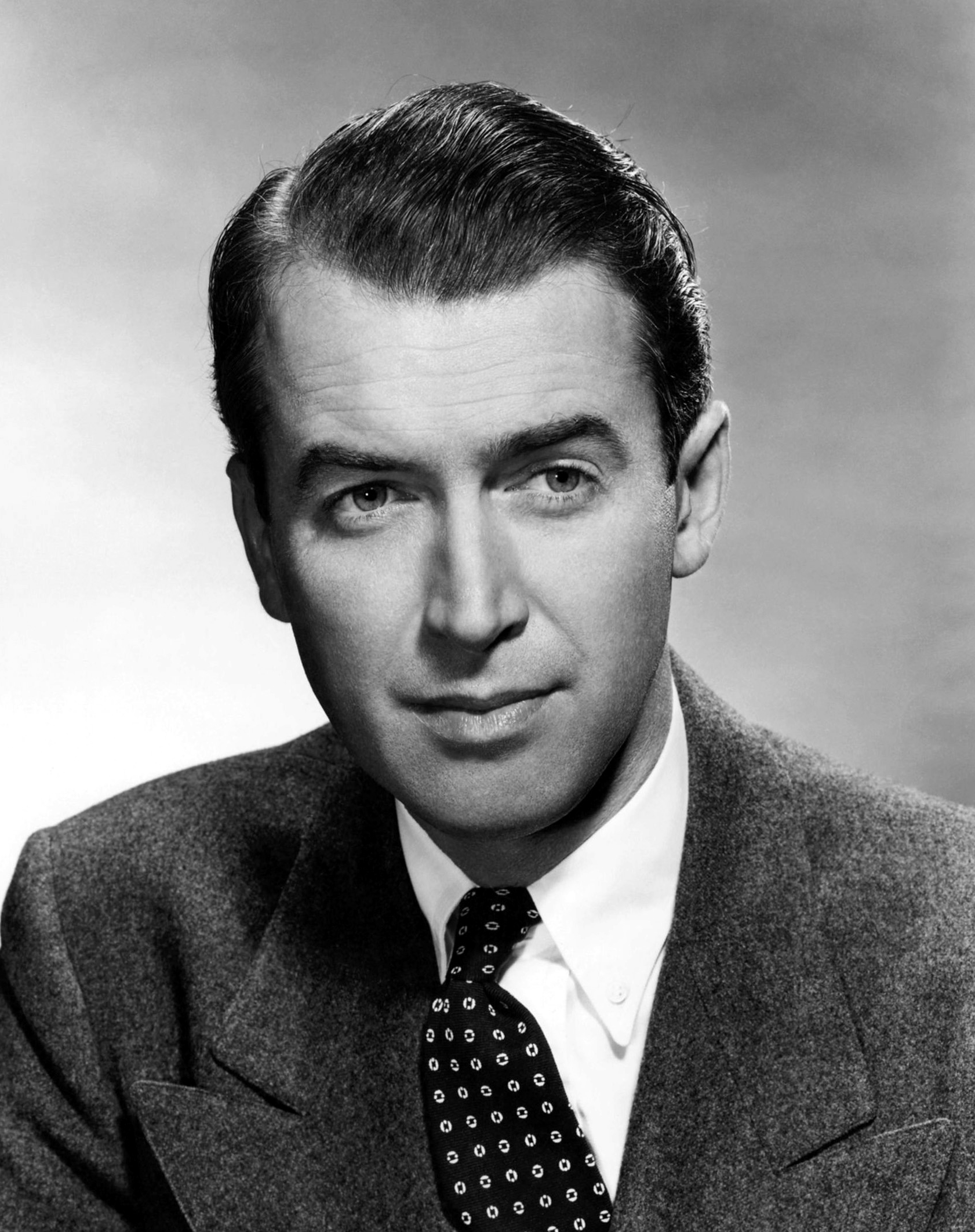
- Stewart in 1942
Awards and nominations
Award	Wins	Nominations
Academy Awards	2	6
British Academy Film Awards	0	2
Golden Globe Awards	1	3
Grammy Awards	0	1

Totals (Note: Certain award groups do not simply award one winner. They acknowledge several different recipients, have runners-up, and have third place. Since this is a specific recognition and is different from losing an award, runner-up mentions are considered wins in this award tally. For simplification and to avoid errors, each award in this list has been presumed to have had a prior nomination.)
- Wins: 50
- Nominations: 100

This article is a List of awards and nominations received by James Stewart.

James Stewart (1908–1997) was an American actor known for his leading roles in numerous films. Over his career he received several awards including an Academy Award and a Golden Globe Award as well as nominations for two BAFTA Awards and a Grammy Award.

Stewart won the Academy Award for Best Actor for his comedic role as a reporter in the romantic comedy The Philadelphia Story (1940). He was Oscar-nominated for playing an idealistic young senator in the political drama Mr. Smith Goes to Washington (1939), George Bailey in the drama It's a Wonderful Life (1946), an eccentric man in Harvey (1950), and a small town lawyer in Anatomy of a Murder (1959). For the later he won the Venice International Film Festival's Volpi Cup for Best Actor. He also won the San Sebastián International Film Festival's Silver Shell for Best Actor for Vertigo (1958) and the Berlin International Film Festival's Silver Bear for Best Actor for Mr. Hobbs Takes a Vacation (1962).

He was nominated for the BAFTA Award for Best Actor in a Leading Role for playing the title role in The Glenn Miller Story (1954) and a lawyer in Anatomy of a Murder (1959). He won the Golden Globe Award for Best Actor – Television Series Drama for playing Billy Jim Hawkins in the CBS legal drama series Hawkins (1974). He was Globe-nominated for Harvey (1950) and Mr. Hobbs Takes a Vacation (1962). He won the New York Film Critics Circle Award for Best Actor for Mr. Smith Goes to Washington (1939) and Anatomy of a Murder (1959).

Over his career he has received numerous honorary awards including a star on the Hollywood Walk of Fame in 1960, the Golden Globe Cecil B. DeMille Award in 1965, the Screen Actors Guild Life Achievement Award in 1968, the AFI Life Achievement Award in 1980, the Kennedy Center Honors in 1983, the Academy Honorary Award in 1985, and the Film at Lincoln Center Gala Tribute in 1990. Twelve of his films have been selected to be preserved by National Film Registry. Five of his films were named in the 100 Greatest Movies of All Time list by Entertainment Weekly.

Stewart is also known for having served in the United States Army. He was awarded with the Presidential Medal of Freedom from President Ronald Reagan. For his military service he received several honors including the Air Force Distinguished Service Medal, the Distinguished Flying Cross, the World War II Victory Medal, the National Defense Service Medal, the Army Commendation Medal, and the Croix de Guerre.

== Major associations ==
=== Academy Awards ===
Year	Category	Nominated work	Result	Ref.
1939	Best Actor	Mr. Smith Goes to Washington	Nominated	
1940	Best Actor	The Philadelphia Story	Won	
1946	Best Actor	It's a Wonderful Life	Nominated	
1950	Best Actor	Harvey	Nominated	
1959	Best Actor	Anatomy of a Murder	Nominated	
1985	Honorary Award		Won	

=== BAFTA Awards ===
Year	Category	Nominated work	Result	Ref.
1955	Best Foreign Actor	The Glenn Miller Story	Nominated	
1960	Best Foreign Actor	Anatomy of a Murder	Nominated	

=== Golden Globe Awards ===
Year	Category	Nominated work	Result	Ref.
1950	Best Motion Picture Actor – Drama	Harvey	Nominated	
1962	Best Actor – Musical or Comedy	Mr. Hobbs Takes a Vacation	Nominated	
1965	Cecil B. DeMille Award		Won	
1974	Best TV Actor – Drama	Hawkins	Won	

=== Grammy Awards ===
Year	Category	Nominated work	Result	Ref.
1991	Best Spoken Word	Jimmy Stewart And His Poems	Nominated	

== Miscellaneous awards ==
Organizations	Year	Category	Work	Result	Ref.
Berlin International Film Festivals	1962	Silver Bear for Best Actor	Mr. Hobbs Takes a Vacation	Won	
New York Film Critics Circle	1939	Best Actor	Mr. Smith Goes to Washington	Won	
New York Film Critics Circle	1959	Best Actor	Anatomy of a Murder	Won	
San Sebastián International Film Festival	1958	Silver Shell for Best Actor	Vertigo	Won	
Venice Film Festival	1959	Volpi Cup for Best Actor	Anatomy of a Murder	Won	

== Honorary awards ==
Organizations	Year	Award	Result	Ref.
Princeton University	1947	Honorary degree	Honored	
Princeton University	1990	Woodrow Wilson Award	Honored	
Princeton University	1997	James M. Stewart '32 Theater	Honored	
Boy Scouts of America	1958	Silver Buffalo Award	Honored	
Hollywood Walk of Fame	1960	Motion Picture Star	Honored	
Screen Actors Guild Awards	1968	Lifetime Achievement Award	Honored	
Harvard University	1971	Man of the Year	Honored	
George Eastman House	1978	The George Eastman Award	Honored	
American Film Institute	1980	AFI Lifetime Achievement Award	Honored	
John F. Kennedy Center for the Performing Arts	1983	Kennedy Center Honors	Honored	
Motion Picture & Television Fund	1983	Golden Boot Award	Honored	
President of the United States	1985	Presidential Medal of Freedom	Honored	
National Board of Review	1990	Lifetime Achievement	Honored	
Lincoln Center for the Performing Arts	1990	Gala Tribute Award	Honored	
National Association of Theatre Owners	1990	Lifetime Achievement	Honored	
Palm Springs International Film Festival	1992	Lifetime Achievement	Honored	

== U.S. Military and civilian awards ==
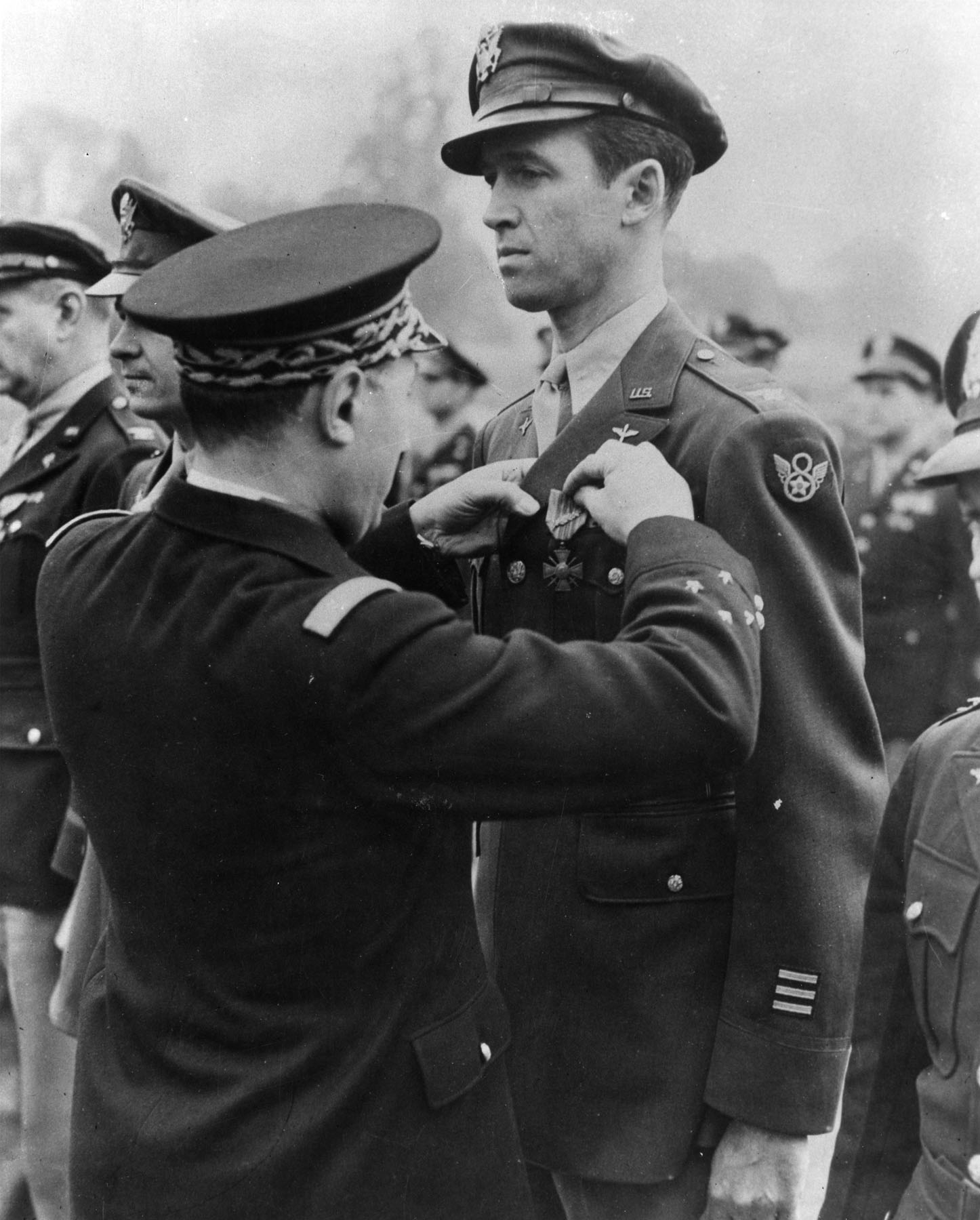
Receiving French Croix de Guerre with Palm in 1944

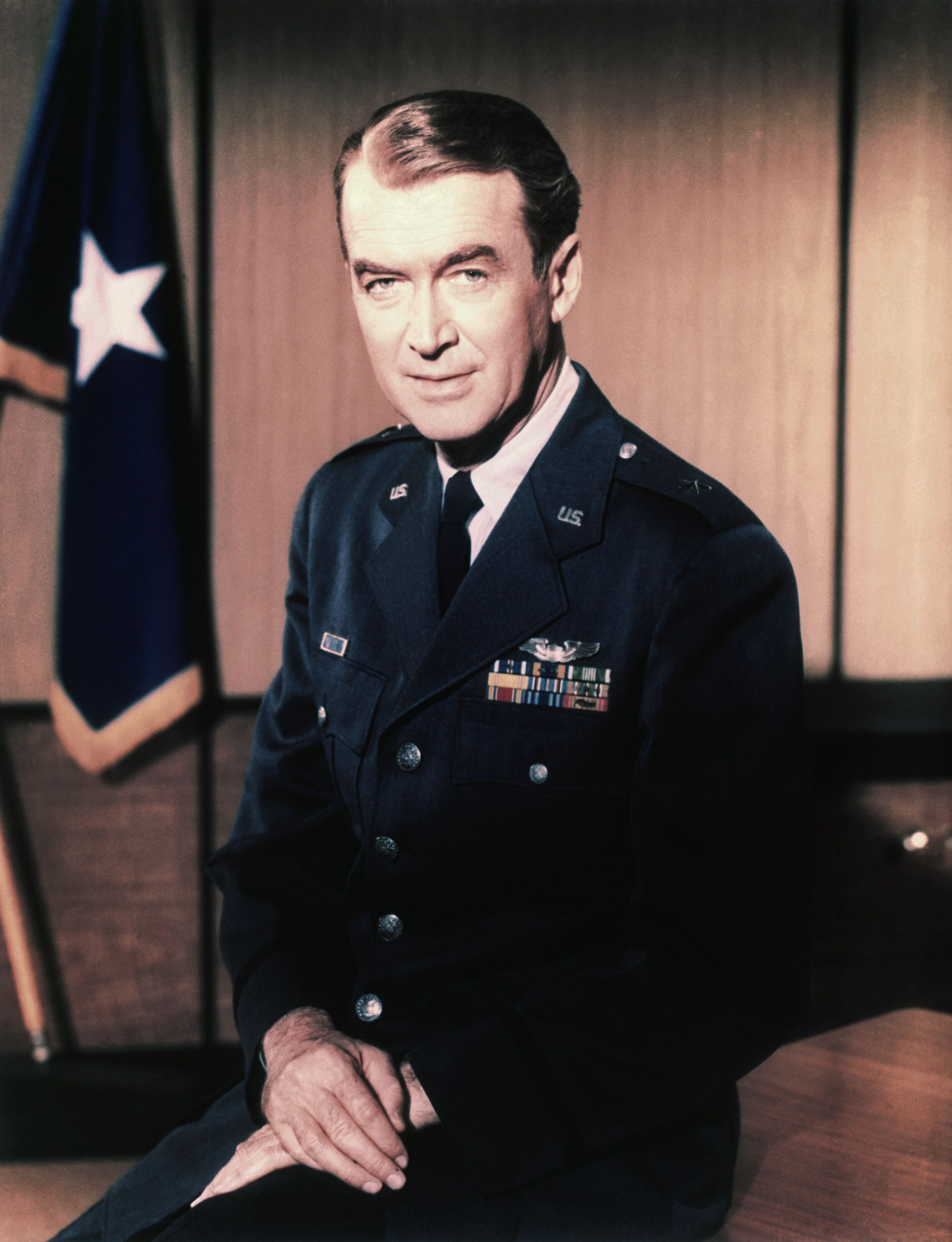
Brig. Gen. Stewart, c. 1960

James Stewart was drafted in October 1940 into the United States Army, although he was initially rejected for being underweight. Work with a trainer allowed him to pass a subsequent physical, and he enlisted in the USAAC in March 1941. During World War II he was awarded two Distinguished Flying Crosses and four Air Medals, as well as the French Croix de Guerre with bronze palm.

Command Pilot Badge
Air Force Distinguished Service Medal	Distinguished Flying Cross with 1 Bronze Oak Leaf Cluster	
Air Medal with 3 Bronze Oak Leaf Cluster	Army Commendation Medal	Presidential Unit Citation
Presidential Medal of Freedom	American Defense Service Medal	American Campaign Medal
European-African-Middle Eastern Campaign Medal with 1 Silver Star	World War II Victory Medal	National Defense Service Medal
Air Force Longevity Service Award with 1 Silver Oak Leaf cluster	Armed Forces Reserve Medal with Silver Hourglass Device (Originally Bronze)	Croix de Guerre with bronze palm (France)

== Memorials and tributes ==
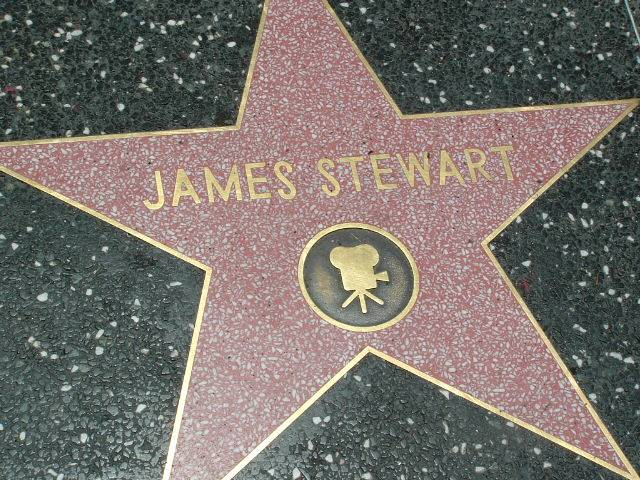
Hollywood Walk of Fame

- Stewart was invited to leave his handprints in the forecourt of Grauman's Chinese Theatre in 1948.
- In 1945, Col. James Stewart was featured on the cover of Life.
- In 1971, James Stewart was featured on the cover of TV Guide.
- In honor of his years of service with the U.S. Air Force, Brig. Gen. Stewart's original World War II A-2 jacket (a Rough Wear 1401 contract) has been displayed for many years at the National Museum of the United States Air Force in Dayton, Ohio. A patch for the 703rd Bomb Squadron is still sewn on the front of the jacket.
- A World War II air force uniform belonging to Stewart is also on display in the American Air Museum at the Imperial War Museum at Duxford, near Cambridge, England.
- In 1972, Stewart was inducted into the Western Performers Hall of Fame at the National Cowboy & Western Heritage Museum in Oklahoma City, Oklahoma.
- In his hometown, Indiana, Pennsylvania, a larger-than-life statue of Stewart was erected on the lawn of the Indiana County Courthouse on 20 May 1983 to celebrate Stewart's 75th birthday. In 1995, The Jimmy Stewart Museum, a museum dedicated to his life and career, opened as well in Indiana, Pennsylvania. A replica of his statue, rendered in green fiberglass resides in the museum. The Jimmy Stewart Museum also presents the "Harvey Award" to a distinguished celebrity tied to James Stewart's spirit of humanitarianism, citizenship, service to country and love of family. Recipients include Robert Wagner, Shirley Jones, Janet Leigh, Rich Little, Grace Kelly, Jim Caviezel.
- James Stewart also has the Indiana County-Jimmy Stewart Airport named in his honor in Pennsylvania.
- In November 1997, Los Angeles County Supervisor Mike Antonovich led an unsuccessful attempt to have Los Angeles International Airport renamed in Stewart's honour.
- In 1998, a year after Stewart's death, a monument was erected in his memory in Griffith Park, Los Angeles, where he hosted his annual "The Jimmy Stewart Relay Marathon Race". The monument consists of a 25-foot flagpole, atop a rock pedestal, with a plaque praising the actor.
- An award for Boy Scouts, "The James M. Stewart Good Citizenship Award" has been presented since 17 May 2003.
- On 13 August 2007, Building 52 on Bolling AFB, Washington D.C. was dedicated to Stewart and was renamed "Brigadier General Jimmy Stewart Theater". In the 1940s, the facility served as the base theater. In honor of General Stewart's distinguished military and film careers, the first video shown in the newly dedicated theater was a ten-minute Air Force recruitment spot he did as a lieutenant. General Stewart was the acting Reserve Wing Commander 11th Wing, at Bolling AFB in 1957–1958.
- On 17 August 2007, the United States Postal Service issued a 41-cent commemorative postage stamp honoring James Stewart, with the ceremonies being held at Universal Studios in Hollywood, California.
- On the centenary of James Stewart's birth, 20 May 2008, Turner Classic Movies honored him with a marathon of his films, including The Stratton Story, The Mortal Storm, The Shop Around the Corner, The Philadelphia Story, The Glenn Miller Story, The Man Who Knew Too Much, Vertigo, Rear Window, The Man Who Shot Liberty Valance, Anatomy of a Murder, Mr. Smith Goes to Washington, and Harvey.
- On 24 May 2008, the "Centennial Festival Day" was held in Stewart's hometown, centering on the Indiana County courthouse and Jimmy Stewart Museum. Items from Stewart's home were on display at the Indiana County Historical Society. An exhibit called "Dear Mr. Stewart", a collection of gifts to Stewart from fans, was on display. The items range from a poem ripped out of a notebook to an ostrich egg. The Boy Scouts had themed activity stations for children based on Stewart films. Co-star Grace Kelly was presented posthumously the "Harvey Award". The celebration also included a fly-over by the USAF, the USAF Brass Band and others, screenings of Stewart's films, and completing with birthday cake.
- On June 12, 2008, the Academy of Motion Picture Arts and Sciences hosted "A Centennial Tribute to James Stewart" in Beverly Hills, California. The program included film clips and comments from family, friends and colleagues. It also served as the closing for the University of California, Los Angeles Film & Television Archive's film festival "The Picture Starts in Heaven: James Stewart's Centennial", which began on 23 May 2008 in Westwood, Los Angeles, California.
- General Stewart was also bestowed the honor of having a Civil Air Patrol Composite Squadron named after him, with his permission. The Squadron is located in Sayreville, New Jersey, and is part of Group 223.
- An award for excellent student filmmakers, "The Jimmy Stewart Memorial Crystal Heart Award" has been presented since 1999.

== Movie lists ==
National Film Registry

As of 2020, there are 12 films starring James Stewart preserved in the United States National Film Registry by the Library of Congress as being "culturally, historically, or aesthetically significant".

- Mr. Smith Goes to Washington (1939)
- Destry Rides Again (1939)
- The Shop Around the Corner (1940)
- The Philadelphia Story (1940)
- It's a Wonderful Life (1946)
- Winchester '73 (1950)
- The Naked Spur (1953)
- Rear Window (1954)
- Vertigo (1958)
- Anatomy of a Murder (1959)
- The Man Who Shot Liberty Valance (1962)
- How the West Was Won (1962)

AFI 100 Years... series

Stewart was named the third Greatest Male Star of All Time.

- AFI's 100 Years... 100 Movies (10th Anniversary Edition)
  - Stewart is the leading actor who is most represented on the list of 100 Films with five of his films.
  - Stewart is one of the most represented stars with ten films on the list of 400 nominees.
  - Vertigo...# 9
  - It's a Wonderful Life...# 20
  - Mr. Smith Goes to Washington...# 26
  - The Philadelphia Story...# 44
  - Rear Window...# 48
- AFI's 100 Years... 100 Cheers
  - Stewart played the main role in two out of the top five films.
  - It's a Wonderful Life...# 1
  - Mr. Smith Goes to Washington...# 5
  - The Spirit of St. Louis...# 69
- AFI's 100 Years... 100 Passions
  - It's a Wonderful Life...# 8
  - Vertigo...# 18
  - The Shop Around the Corner...# 28
  - The Philadelphia Story...# 44
- AFI's 100 Years... 100 Thrills
  - Rear Window...#14
  - Vertigo...# 18
- AFI's 100 Years... 100 Laughs
  - The Philadelphia Story...# 15
  - Harvey...# 35
- AFI's 100 Years... 100 Heroes and Villains
  - 50 greatest movie heroes
  - It's a Wonderful Life...George Bailey ...# 9
  - Mr. Smith Goes to Washington...Jefferson Smith ...# 11
- AFI's 10 Top 10
  - Stewart is the most represented leading actor with six films, making his mark in four genres.
  - Mystery film
    - Vertigo...# 1
    - Rear Window...# 3
  - Fantasy
    - It's a Wonderful Life...# 3
    - Harvey...# 7
  - Romantic Comedies
    - The Philadelphia Story...# 5
  - Courtroom Drama
    - Anatomy of a Murder...# 7

IMDb Top 250 movies

Films continuously listed on the IMDb Top 250 movies:

- Rear Window (1954)
- It's a Wonderful Life (1946)
- Vertigo (1958)
- Mr. Smith Goes to Washington (1939)

Entertainment Weekly

Stewart is the most represented leading actor with five films on the 100 Greatest Movies of All Time list presented by Entertainment Weekly.

- Vertigo (1958)
- Mr. Smith Goes to Washington (1939)
- The Philadelphia Story (1940)
- It's a Wonderful Life (1946)
- The Shop Around the Corner (1940)

== See also ==
- James Stewart filmography
