= James Stewart filmography =

List of films 1934–1991

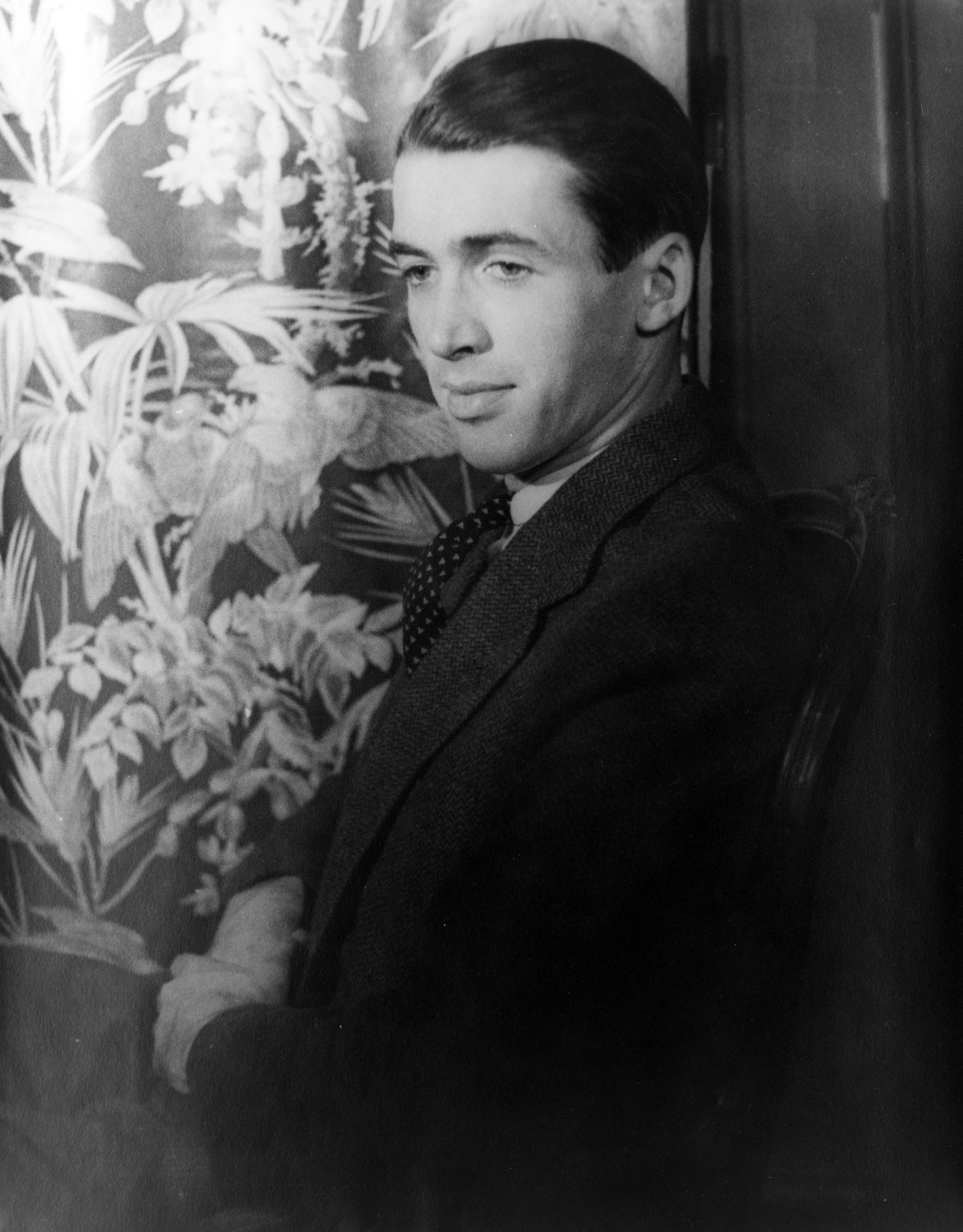
Stewart in 1934

James Stewart (1908–1997) was a prolific American actor who appeared in a variety of film roles in Hollywood, primarily of the Golden Age of Hollywood. From the beginning of his film career in 1934 through his final theatrical project in 1991, Stewart appeared in more than 92 films, television programs, and short subjects.

Stewart received several awards and nominations for his work. In 1999, he was ranked third by the American Film Institute on its "AFI's 100 Years... 100 Stars" list.

Twelve of his films have been preserved in the United States National Film Registry. He won the Academy Award for Best Actor for The Philadelphia Story whilst roles in Mr. Smith Goes to Washington, It's a Wonderful Life, Harvey and Anatomy of a Murder earned him Academy Award nominations. He also won a Golden Globe Award for his role in the television series Hawkins.

== Film career ==
=== Directors ===
Stewart made his mark in screwball comedies, suspense thrillers, westerns and family comedies. He worked multiple times with directors, such as Anthony Mann (Winchester '73, Bend of the River, Thunder Bay, The Naked Spur, The Glenn Miller Story, The Far Country, The Man from Laramie and Strategic Air Command), Alfred Hitchcock (Rope, Rear Window, The Man Who Knew Too Much and Vertigo), John Ford (Two Rode Together, The Man Who Shot Liberty Valance and Cheyenne Autumn) and Frank Capra (It's a Wonderful Life, Mr. Smith Goes to Washington and You Can't Take It with You).

Directors with whom he also worked include Henry Hathaway (Call Northside 777 and How the West Was Won), Frank Borzage (The Mortal Storm), Ernst Lubitsch (The Shop Around the Corner), Billy Wilder (The Spirit of St. Louis) and Otto Preminger (Anatomy of a Murder).

=== Actors ===
Actors with whom Stewart worked include Lionel Barrymore, Ward Bond, Walter Brennan, Raymond Burr, Harry Carey, John Dall, Charles Drake, Dan Duryea, Frank Faylen, Henry Fonda, Clark Gable, Ben Gazzara, Farley Granger, Cary Grant, Tom Helmore, Charlton Heston, Rock Hudson, Todd Karns, Arthur Kennedy, Karl Malden, Lee Marvin, Bernard Miles, Thomas Mitchell, Robert Mitchum, Frank Morgan, Harry Morgan, Arthur O'Connell, William Powell, Claude Rains, Oliver Reed, Edward G. Robinson, Mickey Rooney, Robert Ryan, George C. Scott, Robert Taylor, Spencer Tracy, Henry Travers, John Wayne, Richard Widmark and Cornel Wilde.

Actresses with whom Stewart worked include June Allyson, Eve Arden, Jean Arthur, Carroll Baker, Joan Chandler, Claudette Colbert, Joan Crawford, Bette Davis, Doris Day, Brenda de Banzie, Marlene Dietrich, Peggy Dow, Joan Fontaine, Barbara Bel Geddes, Paulette Goddard, Gloria Grahame, Jean Harlow, Katharine Hepburn, Josephine Hull, Betty Hutton, Grace Kelly, Hedy Lamarr, Dorothy Lamour, Janet Leigh, Vera Miles, Agnes Moorehead, Kim Novak, Cathy O'Donnell, Maureen O'Hara, Eleanor Powell, Donna Reed, Lee Remick, Debbie Reynolds, Thelma Ritter, Ginger Rogers, Rosalind Russell, Margaret Sullavan, Shelley Winters and Natalie Wood.

== Feature films ==
Year	Film	Role	Director	Notes
1935	The Murder Man	Shorty	Tim Whelan	
1936	Next Time We Love	Christopher Tyler	Edward H. Griffith	First significant role (first time second-billed)
1936	Rose Marie	John Flower	W. S. Van Dyke	
1936	Wife vs. Secretary	Dave	Clarence Brown	
1936	Small Town Girl	Elmer Clampett	William A. Wellman	
1936	Speed	Terry Martin	Edwin L. Marin	First starring role (first time top-billed)
1936	The Gorgeous Hussy	Roderick "Rowdy" Dow	Clarence Brown	
1936	Born to Dance	Ted Barker	Roy Del Ruth	
1936	After the Thin Man	David Graham	W. S. Van Dyke	
1937	Seventh Heaven	Chico	Henry King	
1937	The Last Gangster	Paul North Sr.	Edward Ludwig	Alternative title: Another Public Enemy
1937	Navy Blue and Gold	John "Truck" Cross/John Cross Carter	Sam Wood	
1938	Of Human Hearts	Jason Wilkins	Clarence Brown	
1938	Vivacious Lady	Prof. Peter Morgan Jr.	George Stevens	
1938	The Shopworn Angel	Pvt. William "Texas" Pettigrew	H. C. Potter	
1938	You Can't Take It with You	Tony Kirby	Frank Capra	
1939	Made for Each Other	John Horace "Johnny" Mason	John Cromwell	
1939	The Ice Follies of 1939	Larry Hall	Reinhold Schünzel	
1939	It's a Wonderful World	Guy Johnson	W. S. Van Dyke	
1939	Mr. Smith Goes to Washington^{[I]}	Jefferson Smith	Frank Capra	New York Film Critics Circle Award for Best Actor; Nominated—Academy Award for Best Actor
1939	Destry Rides Again^{[I]}	Thomas Jefferson Destry Jr.	George Marshall	
1940	The Shop Around the Corner^{[I]}	Alfred Kralik	Ernst Lubitsch	
1940	The Mortal Storm	Martin Breitner	Frank Borzage	
1940	No Time for Comedy	Gaylord "Gay" Esterbrook	William Keighley	
1940	The Philadelphia Story^{[I]}	Macaulay "Mike" Connor	George Cukor	Academy Award for Best Actor
1941	Come Live with Me	Bill Smith	Clarence Brown	
1941	Pot o' Gold	James Hamilton "Jimmy" Haskel	George Marshall	
1941	Ziegfeld Girl	Gilbert "Gil" Young	Robert Z. Leonard	Final film before World War II service
1946	It's a Wonderful Life^{[I]}	George Bailey	Frank Capra	Nominated—Academy Award for Best Actor
1947	Magic Town	Lawrence "Rip" Smith	William A. Wellman	
1948	Call Northside 777	P. J. McNeal	Henry Hathaway	
1948	On Our Merry Way	Slim	King Vidor; Leslie Fenton; John Huston; George Stevens	
1948	Rope	Rupert Cadell	Alfred Hitchcock	
1948	You Gotta Stay Happy	Marvin Payne	H. C. Potter	
1949	The Stratton Story	Monty Stratton	Sam Wood	
1949	Malaya	John Royer	Richard Thorpe	
1950	Winchester '73^{[I]}	Lin McAdam	Anthony Mann	
1950	Broken Arrow	Tom Jeffords	Delmer Daves	
1950	Harvey	Elwood P. Dowd	Henry Koster	Nominated—Academy Award for Best Actor; Nominated—Golden Globe Award for Best Actor – Motion Picture Drama
1950	The Jackpot	William J. 'Bill' Lawrence	Walter Lang	
1951	No Highway in the Sky	Theodore Honey	Henry Koster	
1952	The Greatest Show on Earth	Buttons	Cecil B. DeMille	
1952	Bend of the River	Glyn McLyntock	Anthony Mann	
1952	Carbine Williams	David Marshall "Marsh" Williams	Richard Thorpe	
1953	The Naked Spur^{[I]}	Howard Kemp	Anthony Mann	
1953	Thunder Bay	Steve Martin	Anthony Mann	
1954	The Glenn Miller Story	Glenn Miller	Anthony Mann	Nominated—BAFTA Award for Best Foreign Actor
1954	The Far Country	Jeff Webster	Anthony Mann	
1954	Rear Window^{[I]}	L. B. "Jeff" Jefferies	Alfred Hitchcock	
1955	The Man from Laramie	Will Lockhart	Anthony Mann	
1955	Strategic Air Command	Lt. Col. Robert "Dutch" Holland	Anthony Mann	
1956	The Man Who Knew Too Much	Dr. Benjamin "Ben" McKenna	Alfred Hitchcock	
1957	The Spirit of St. Louis	Charles Lindbergh	Billy Wilder	
1957	Night Passage	Grant McLaine	James Neilson	
1958	Vertigo^{[I]}	Det. John "Scottie" Ferguson	Alfred Hitchcock	San Sebastián International Film Festival Award for Best Actor
1958	Bell, Book and Candle	Shepherd "Shep" Henderson	Richard Quine	
1959	Anatomy of a Murder^{[I]}	Paul Biegler	Otto Preminger	Laurel Award for Top Male Dramatic Performance; New York Film Critics Circle Award for Best Actor; Venice Film Festival – Volpi Cup; Nominated—Academy Award for Best Actor; Nominated—BAFTA Award for Best Foreign Actor
1959	The FBI Story	John Michael "Chip" Hardesty	Mervyn LeRoy	
1960	The Mountain Road	Major Baldwin	Daniel Mann	
1961	Two Rode Together	Marshal Guthrie McCabe	John Ford	Nominated—Laurel Award for Top Action Performance (3rd place)
1962	The Man Who Shot Liberty Valance^{[I]}	Ransom Stoddard	John Ford	Bronze Wrangler for Theatrical Motion Picture
1962	Mr. Hobbs Takes a Vacation	Roger Hobbs	Henry Koster	Silver Bear for Best Actor; Nominated—Golden Globe Award for Best Actor – Motion Picture Musical or Comedy; Nominated—Laurel Award for Top Male Comedy Performance (3rd place)
1962	How the West Was Won^{[I]}	Linus Rawlings	Henry Hathaway	
1963	Take Her, She's Mine	Frank Michaelson	Henry Koster	Nominated—Laurel Award for Top Male Comedy Performance (4th place)
1964	Cheyenne Autumn	Wyatt Earp	John Ford	
1965	Dear Brigitte	Prof. Robert Leaf	Henry Koster	
1965	Shenandoah	Charlie Anderson	Andrew McLaglen	
1965	The Flight of the Phoenix	Capt. Frank Towns	Robert Aldrich	
1966	The Rare Breed	Sam Burnett	Andrew McLaglen	
1968	Firecreek	Johnny Cobb	Vincent McEveety	
1968	Bandolero!	Mace Bishop	Andrew McLaglen	
1970	The Cheyenne Social Club	John O'Hanlan	Gene Kelly	
1971	Fools' Parade	Mattie Appleyard	Andrew McLaglen	Alternative title: Dynamite Man from Glory Jail
1976	The Shootist	Dr. E. W. Hostetler	Don Siegel	
1977	Airport '77	Philip Stevens	Jerry Jameson	
1978	The Big Sleep	General Sternwood	Michael Winner	
1978	The Magic of Lassie	Clovis Mitchell	Don Chaffey	
1980	The Green Horizon	The Old Man	Susumu Hani	Alternative titles: A Tale of Africa, アフリカの物語 (final live action role)
1991	An American Tail: Fievel Goes West	Wylie Burp	Phil Nibbelink; Simon Wells	Voice (final film role)
I denotes film preservation in the National Film Registry.

=== Box office ranking ===
For a number of years exhibitors voted James Stewart as among the most popular stars in the country:

- 1940 – 11th (US)
- 1941 – 13th (US)
- 1948 – 25th (US)
- 1949 – 11th (US)
- 1950 – 5th (US), 7th (UK)
- 1951 – 16th (US), 2nd (UK)
- 1952 – 6th (US), 8th (UK)
- 1953 – 7th (US)
- 1954 – 4th (US), 2nd (UK)
- 1955 – 1st (US), 2nd (UK)
- 1956 – 3rd (US), 2nd (UK)
- 1957 – 7th (US)
- 1958 – 9th (US)
- 1959 – 3rd (US)
- 1960 – 18th (US)
- 1961 – 22nd (US)
- 1962 – 13th (US)
- 1963 – 14th (US)
- 1964 – 23rd (US)
- 1965 – 8th (US)
- 1966 – 16th (US)
- 1970 – 17th (US)

== Television appearances ==
Stewart had made guest appearances on television, The Jack Benny Program, in the 1950s, but first starred in Flashing Spikes, an hour-long episode of Alcoa Premiere directed by John Ford. In the early 1970s, he transitioned his career from cinema to television. For the series Hawkins, Stewart received the Golden Globe Award for Best Actor – Television Series Drama. In 1972, Stewart reprised his role from the film Harvey in a television film of the same name.

Year	Show	Role	Run	Notes
1959	Lux Playhouse	Narrator	single episode	Narrator for the episode Cowboy Five Seven, which documented a Strategic Air Command crew at Westover Air Force Base
1962	Flashing Spikes	Slim Conway	single episode	Part of the Alcoa Premiere anthology series, directed by John Ford and featuring John Wayne (billed as "Michael Morris")
1971	The Jimmy Stewart Show	Prof. James K. Howard	1971–1972	NBC Television series
1972	Harvey	Elwood P. Dowd	—	PBS Television film
1973	Hawkins	Billy Jim Hawkins	1973–1974	CBS Television series Golden Globe Award for Best Actor – Television Series Drama
1978	The Carol Burnett Show	Himself	single episode	CBS Television series Series finale ("A Special Evening with Carol Burnett")
1980	Mr. Krueger's Christmas	Mr. Krueger	—	NBC Television film
1982	The American Film Institute Salute to Frank Capra	Himself – Host	—	American Film Institute Television film
1983	Right of Way	Teddy Dwyer	—	HBO Television film Nominated—CableACE Award for Actor in a Dramatic or Theatrical Program
1986	North and South, Book II	Miles Colbert	—	ABC Miniseries

== Documentaries and short subjects ==
Incomplete listing.

Year	Movie	Role	Director	Notes
1934	Art Trouble	Mr. Burton	Ralph Staub	Uncredited; Shemp Howard short
1935	Important News	Cornelius "Corn" Stevens	Edwin Lawrence	—
1938	Hollywood Goes to Town	Himself		—
1939	Hollywood Hobbies	Himself		—
1942	Fellow Americans	Narrator		for the USAAF
1942	Winning Your Wings	Narrator	John Huston; Owen Crump(uncredited)	for the USAAF
1943	Screen Snapshots: Hollywood in Uniform	Himself		—
1946	American Creed	Himself		—
1947	Thunderbolt!	Narrator	John Sturges; William Wyler	for the USAF
1948	10,000 Kids and a Cop	Narrator	Charles Barton	—
1954	Tomorrow's Drivers	Narrator		—
1956	Screen Snapshots: Hollywood, City of Stars	Himself		—
1957	The Heart of Show Business	Narrator		—
1961	X-15	Narrator		for the United States Air Force USAF
1962	The Convair B-58 Hustler Supersonic Bomber - Champion of Champions	Narrator and USAF Reserve Brig. General		—
1971	Directed by John Ford	Himself	Peter Bogdanovich	—
1971	The American West of John Ford	Himself	Denis Sanders	—
1974	The World at War - "12. Whirlwind"	Himself		Thames Television ITV series
1974	Just One More Time	Himself		—
1974	That's Entertainment!	Himself and Archive Footage	Jack Haley, Jr.	—
1976	An All-Star Tribute to John Wayne	Himself	N/A	—
1983	James Bond: The First 21 Years	Himself	N/A	—
1987	James Stewart: A Wonderful Life	Himself and Archive Footage	David Heeley	—
1993	John Ford	Himself	N/A	—
1994	A Century of Cinema	Himself and Archive Footage	Caroline Thomas	—

== See also ==
- List of film collaborations
- List of awards and nominations received by James Stewart
