= Erik Rhodes (actor, born 1906) =

American actor and singer (1906–1990)

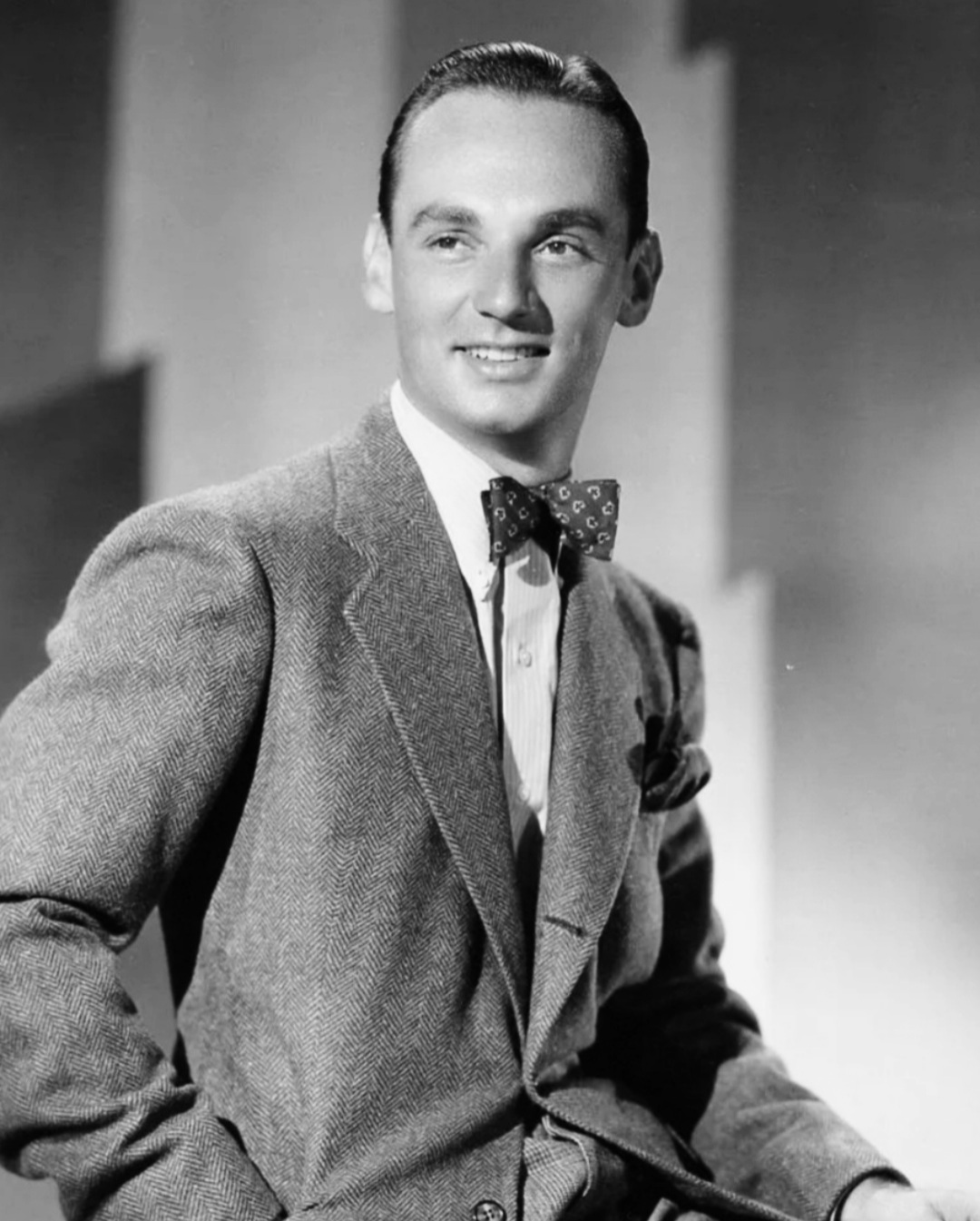
- Rhodes in 1935
- Born: Ernest Sharpe; February 10, 1906; El Reno, Oklahoma Territory, U.S.
- Died: February 17, 1990 (aged 84); Oklahoma City, Oklahoma, U.S.
- Resting place: El Reno Cemetery, El Reno, Oklahoma
- Education: University of Oklahoma
- Occupations: Actor; singer
- Years active: 1927–1976
- Spouse: Emmala Dunbar (m. 1972; died 1984)

Erik Rhodes (born Ernest Sharpe; February 10, 1906 – February 17, 1990) was an American film and Broadway singer and actor. He is best remembered today for appearing in two classic Hollywood musical films with the popular dancing team of Fred Astaire and Ginger Rogers: The Gay Divorcee (1934) and Top Hat (1935).

== Early years ==
Rhodes was born Ernest R. Sharpe at El Reno, Indian Territory, now Oklahoma, the son of Mr. and Mrs. Ernest A. Sharpe. He attended Central High School and the University of Oklahoma. While he was a student at the university, he earned a scholarship that enabled him to spend a year in New York studying voice.

During World War II, Rhodes was a language specialist in the intelligence service of the Army Air Force.

== Career ==
Rhodes started performing on the Broadway stage in A Most Immoral Lady (1928) using his birth name, Ernest R. Sharpe. This was followed by two musicals, The Little Show (1929) and Hey Nonny Nonny! (1932).

He first used the name Erik Rhodes when he appeared on Broadway in Gay Divorce (1932) and again in London in 1933. In this show, he gave a memorable comic portrayal of a spirited, feather-brained, thick-accented Italian character that impressed RKO executives enough to bring him to Hollywood to reprise the role in the film version, The Gay Divorcee (1934) and then repeated in Top Hat (1935), much to Mussolini's displeasure. (Note: The different spellings of Gay Divorce (Broadway play, 1932) and The Gay Divorcee (film, 1934) are not a typographic error. When the film was made, film censors objected to the description of a divorce as "gay" (in the traditional meaning of the word – happy, cheerful). Hence, the title change.)

In 1946, he was called in to take over a role in the Vernon Duke musical Sweet Bye and Bye during its tryout, but the show closed before reaching Broadway. Between 1947 and 1964, he was back on Broadway in The Great Campaign, Dance Me a Song, Collector's Item, Shinbone Alley, Jamaica, How to Make a Man, and A Funny Thing Happened on the Way to the Forum. In the Cole Porter musical Can-Can, he appeared as a lecherous art critic, and introduced the song "Come Along With Me".

Rhodes also acted in regional theater, including Playhouse on the Mall in Paramus, New Jersey, and the Forrest Theatre in Philadelphia.

On radio, Rhodes was heard regularly on the variety show 51 East 51st. On television, he was co-host of Second Cup of Coffee, which debuted on WJZ in New York City on October 15, 1952. The Monday-Friday 15-minute daytime program combined talk and music. Among his other TV appearances, he performed in the variety program Wonder Boy and played the role of murder victim Herman Albright in the 1961 Perry Mason episode, "The Case of the Violent Vest."

== Death ==
Rhodes died of pneumonia in an Oklahoma City nursing home on February 17, 1990, at age 84 and is interred with his wife in the El Reno Cemetery in El Reno, Oklahoma.

== Filmography ==
=== Film ===
- Give Her a Ring (1934) – Otto Brune
- The Gay Divorcee (1934) – Rodolfo Tonetti
- Charlie Chan in Paris (1935) – Max Corday
- A Night at the Ritz (1935) – Leopold Jaynos
- The Nitwits (1935) – George Clark
- Old Man Rhythm (1935) – Frank Rochet
- Top Hat (1935) – Alberto Beddini
- Another Face (1935) – Grimm – Assistant Director
- Two in the Dark (1936) – Carlo Gheet
- Chatterbox (1936) – Mr. Archie Fisher
- Special Investigator (1936) – Benny Gray
- One Rainy Afternoon (1936) – Count Alfredo Donstelli
- Second Wife (1936) – Dave Bennet
- Smartest Girl in Town (1936) – Baron Enrico Torene
- Criminal Lawyer (1937) – Bandini
- Woman Chases Man (1937) – Henri Saffron
- Music for Madame (1937) – Spaghetti Nadzio
- Fight for Your Lady (1937) – Anton Spadissimo
- Beg, Borrow or Steal (1937) – Lefevre
- The Canary Comes Across (1938, Short) – Canary Dillon
- Meet the Girls (1938) – Maurice Leon
- Mysterious Mr. Moto (1938) – David Scott-Frensham
- Say It in French (1938) – Irving
- Dramatic School (1938) – Georges Mounier
- On Your Toes (1939) – Konstantin Morrisine
- Hollywood The Golden Years: The RKO Story (1987, TV Series documentary) – Himself

=== Television ===
- The Chevrolet Tele-Theatre (1948, Episode: "Mirage in Manhattan")
- Appointment with Adventure (1955, Episode: "Escape from Vienna")
- Perry Mason (1961, Episode: "The Case of the Violent Vest") – Herman Albright

== Broadway ==
- A Most Immoral Lady (1928)
- The Little Show (1929)
- Hey Nonny Nonny! (1932)
- Gay Divorce (1932)
- The Great Campaign (1947)
- Dance Me a Song (1950)
- Collector's Item (1952)
- Can-Can (1953)
- Shinbone Alley (1957)
- Jamaica (1957)
- How to Make a Man (1961)
- A Funny Thing Happened on the Way to the Forum (1962)
