= My Six Convicts =

1952 film by Hugo Fregonese

- Directed by: Hugo Fregonese
- Screenplay by: Michael Blankfort
- Based on: Book by Donald Powell Wilson
- Produced by: Edna and Edward Anhalt (associate producers)
- Starring: Millard Mitchell; Gilbert Roland; John Beal; Marshall Thompson
- Cinematography: Guy Roe, A.S.C.
- Edited by: Gene Havlick, A.C.E.
- Music by: Dimitri Tiomkin
- Production company: Stanley Kramer Productions
- Distributed by: Columbia Pictures
- Release date: March 14, 1952
- Running time: 104 minutes
- Country: United States
- Language: English
- Box office: $1.1 million (U.S. rentals)

My Six Convicts is a 1952 American crime film noir directed by Hugo Fregonese and starring Millard Mitchell, Gilbert Roland, John Beal and Marshall Thompson.

== Plot ==
Prison psychologist Doc attempts to help his incarcerated patients.

== Cast ==
- Millard Mitchell as James Connie
- Gilbert Roland as Punch Pinero
- John Beal as Doc
- Marshall Thompson as Blivens Scott
- Alf Kjellin as Clem Randall
- Henry Morgan as Dawson
- Jay Adler as Steve Kopac
- Regis Toomey as Dr. Gordon
- Fay Roope as the Warden
- Carleton Young as Captain Haggerty
- John Marley as Knotty Johnson
- Russ Conway as Dr. Hughes
- Byron Foulger as Dr. Brint
- Charles Bronson as Jocko (as Charles Buchinsky)

== Production ==
The screenplay was adapted by Michael Blankfort from the autobiographical book My Six Convicts: A Psychologist's Three Years in Fort Leavenworth, written by Donald Powell Wilson.

The film was shot on location at San Quentin State Prison, where warden Clinton Duffy had implemented reforms that sought to rehabilitate prisoners much in the same way as does the Doc character. Because of San Quentin's strict policy prohibiting women from entering the inner prison area, a short prison guard was asked to impersonate the Mrs. Randall character in long shots. Actress Carol Savage portrayed the character in closeup studio shots.

Musical director Dimitri Tiomkin visited Sing Sing prison to hear the prisoners' band and songs sung by the prisoners in preparation for his film score.

== Reception ==
In a contemporary review for The New York Times, critic A. H. Weiler wrote: "[P]enology, psychology and crime have been blended into a compassionate, thoughtful, incisive and, above all, genuinely humorous account of life behind prison walls. ... There may be doubters who will scoff at the possibility of a convict such as Connie being permitted to leave the penitentiary (under guard) to open a bank safe but as played by Millard Mitchell, who runs off with the acting honors, the facts are not particularly important."

Director Hugo Fregonese received fan letters from prison inmates and said, "I'm flattered. After all, these are the first fan letters I've ever received."

== Awards ==
Award	Category	Recipient(s)	Result
Golden Globe Awards	Best Supporting Actor	Millard Mitchell	Won
Directors Guild of America Awards	Outstanding Directing – Feature Film	Hugo Fregonese	Nominated

== See also ==
- Do Aankhen Barah Haath (1957), Indian film directed by V Shantaram.
