= The Fourth Horseman (film) =

1932 film

- Theatrical release poster
- Directed by: Hamilton MacFadden
- Screenplay by: Jack Cunningham
- Story by: Nina Wilcox Putnam
- Produced by: Stanley Bergerman
- Starring: Tom Mix; Margaret Lindsay; Fred Kohler; Donald Kirke; Raymond Hatton; Buddy Roosevelt
- Cinematography: Daniel B. Clark
- Edited by: Philip Cahn
- Production company: Universal Pictures
- Distributed by: Universal Pictures
- Release date: September 25, 1932
- Running time: 57 minutes
- Country: United States
- Language: English

The Fourth Horseman is a 1932 American Western film directed by Hamilton MacFadden and written by Jack Cunningham. The film stars Tom Mix, Margaret Lindsay, Fred Kohler, Donald Kirke, Raymond Hatton and Buddy Roosevelt. It was released on September 25, 1932, by Universal Pictures.

== Plot ==
Former train robber Jones wants to take control of Stillwell, a ghost town that is owned by O'Rourke. Martin suspects that Jones has evil intentions and works to undermine the scheme.

== Cast ==
- Tom Mix as Tom Martin
- Margaret Lindsay as Molly O'Rourke
- Fred Kohler as Honest Ben Jones
- Donald Kirke as Henchman Thad
- Raymond Hatton as Tax Clerk Gabby
- Buddy Roosevelt as Fancy
- Grace Cunard as Mrs. Elmer Brown
- Fred Howard as Elmer Brown
- Helene Millard as 'Baby-Face'
- C.E. Anderson as Caleb Winters
- Harry Allen as Charlie
- Herman Nowlin as Bill Thrasher
- Duke R. Lee as Henchman Jim
- Tony the Horse as Tom's Horse
