= Donald Kirke =

American actor (1901–1971)

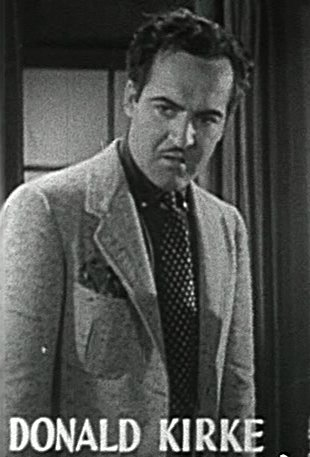
- Born: May 17, 1901; Jersey City, New Jersey, U.S.
- Died: May 18, 1971 (aged 70); Los Angeles, California, U.S.
- Occupation: Actor
- Years active: 1929–1960

Donald Kirke (May 17, 1901 – May 18, 1971) was an American stage, film and television actor.

== Career ==
In the early 1920s, Kirke acted in stock theater, including the Gene Lewis-Olga Worth and the Lewis-Worth companies.

Kirke's Broadway credits include The Constant Sinner (1931), A Woman Denied (1931), The Old Rascal (1930), Remote Control (1929), and Gang War (1928).

On December 18, 1922, Kirke signed a contract with the Christie Film Company, for which he had worked two years before going into stock theater. He ventured into vaudeville in August 1923. He left the Keith's State Stock Company to be in the drama The Song of India, which was opening in Harrisburg, Pennsylvania.

== Death ==
Kirke died in Los Angeles, California on May 18, 1971, one day after his 70th birthday.

== Filmography ==
Year	Title	Role	Notes
1930	Follow the Leader	R.C. Black	
1931	A Lesson in Love		Short, Uncredited
1932	The Fourth Horseman	Thad - Henchman	
1932	Hidden Gold	Doc Griffin	
1933	Women Won't Tell	Alvin Thompson	
1933	Blondie Johnson	Joe	
1934	The Ghost Walks	Terry Shaw aka Terry Gray	
1935	Let 'Em Have It	Curley	
1936	Sunset of Power	Page Cothran	
1936	Border Flight	Heming	
1936	Oh, Susanna!	Flash Baldwin	
1936	Ride 'Em Cowboy	Sam Parker Jr.	
1936	In His Steps	Reynard	
1936	Country Gentlemen	Mr. Martin	
1937	Rich Relations		
1937	Paradise Express	Armstrong	
1937	Venus Makes Trouble	Lon Stanton	
1937	Smoke Tree Range	Wirt Stoner	
1937	Range Defenders	Townsman	Uncredited
1937	The Emperor's Candlesticks	Anton - the Thief	
1937	Midnight Madonna	Alonzo Hall	Uncredited
1937	The Big Shot	Johnny Cullen	
1937	Mannequin	Dave McIntyre	Uncredited
1937	The Shadow	Peter Martinet	
1938	Hawaii Calls	Regon	
1938	Rawhide	Reporter	Uncredited
1938	I Demand Payment	Mr. Twitchett	
1938	Sharpshooters	Lasher	Uncredited
1939	Inside Story	Attorney	Uncredited
1939	Big Town Czar	Minor Role	Uncredited
1940	The Showdown	Harry Cole	
1941	Ziegfeld Girl	Playboy Dating Sheila	Uncredited
1942	Outlaws of Pine Ridge	Jeff Cardeen	
1943	G-Men vs. the Black Dragon	Muller - Pier 17 Thug	Serial, [Ch.1]
1943	A Night for Crime	Hamilton Hart	
1946	The Well Groomed Bride	Maitre d'	Uncredited
1947	Hoppy's Holiday	Sheriff	
1956	Scandal Incorporated	Sidney M. Woods	
1957	The Garment Jungle	Salesman	Uncredited

== Bibliography ==
- Vogel, Michelle. Marjorie Main: The Life and Films of Hollywood's "Ma Kettle. McFarland, 2011.
