= A Lesson in Love (1931 film) =

1931 film

- Directed by: Casey Robinson
- Written by: J.R. Murray; Ben Oakland
- Starring: Helen Kane; Donald Kirke; Millard Mitchell
- Distributed by: Paramount Pictures
- Release date: September 26, 1931
- Running time: 10 minutes
- Country: United States
- Language: English

A Lesson in Love is a 1931 American comedy film starring Helen Kane.

== Plot ==
Helen Kane stars as "Helen Lane", a college student who has a crush on her psychology teacher Professor Hotchiss (or "Professor Hot Kiss" as Helen bumbles). The professor however is short-tempered with Helen because she's such a poor student. She disrupts the classroom, and he kicks her out of the class. However later at the school dance Helen can't get over her feelings for Professor Hotchiss. Helen bumps into the professor and they both confess their love for one another. Helen then begins to sing for the professor "I Love Myself Cause You Love Me." After her performance the professor proposes to her, and she accepts.

== Cast ==
- Helen Kane as Helen Lane
- Donald Kirke
- Millard Mitchell
