= William C. Mellor =

American cinematographer

- Born: June 29, 1903; United States
- Died: April 30, 1963 (aged 59); United States
- Resting place: Forest Lawn Memorial Park
- Occupation: Cinematographer

William C. Mellor, A.S.C. (29 June 1903 – 30 April 1963) was a cinematographer who worked at Paramount, MGM and 20th Century Fox during a career that spanned three decades.

After earning his stripes on a string of B-movies in the 1930s, he first started making serious inroads as a leading cinematographer in 1940 when he worked for Preston Sturges on The Great McGinty.

Mellor did his best work with directors George Stevens (winning Oscars for two of his films, A Place in the Sun in 1951 and The Diary of Anne Frank in 1959) and William Wellman (Westward the Woman, 1951). He also contributed to several Anthony Mann westerns, including The Naked Spur in 1953, and a number of MGM musicals. He was nominated for an Academy Award for his work on Mark Robson's Peyton Place in 1957.

He died suddenly of a heart attack while filming Stevens' The Greatest Story Ever Told in 1963. Loyal Griggs replaced Mellor. He is interred at Forest Lawn Memorial Park in Glendale, California.

Mellor received a posthumous Oscar nomination for his work on the film.

== Selected filmography ==
- Wake Island (1942)
- Road to Morocco (1942)
- Too Late for Tears (1949)
- A Place in the Sun (1951)
- The Naked Spur (1953)
- Bad Day at Black Rock (1955)
- Giant (1956)
- Love in the Afternoon (1957)
- Peyton Place (1957)
- The Diary of Anne Frank (1959)
- Compulsion (1959)
- The Best of Everything (1959)
- State Fair (1962)
- Mr. Hobbs Takes a Vacation (1962)
- The Greatest Story Ever Told (1965)
