= One Rainy Afternoon =

1936 film by Rowland V. Lee

- Theatrical release poster
- Directed by: Rowland V. Lee
- Written by: Screen story: Emeric Pressburger; René Pujol; Screenplay: Stephen Morehouse Avery; Additional dialogue: Maurice Hanline
- Produced by: Mary Pickford; Jesse L. Lasky
- Starring: Francis Lederer; Ida Lupino; Hugh Herbert; Roland Young; Joseph Cawthorn; Erik Rhodes
- Cinematography: Merritt B. Gerstad; J. Peverell Marley
- Edited by: Margaret Clancey
- Music by: Ralph Erwin
- Distributed by: United Artists
- Release date: May 13, 1936
- Running time: 94 minutes; 80 minutes (DVD)
- Country: United States
- Language: English
- Budget: $511,383 (est.)
- Box office: $603,903

One Rainy Afternoon is a 1936 American romantic comedy film directed by Rowland V. Lee, starring Francis Lederer and Ida Lupino, and featuring Hugh Herbert, Roland Young, and Erik Rhodes. It also marked the last film appearance by actress Florence Lawrence, who died in 1938, who had an uncredited bit role in the film. It was written by Stephen Morehouse Avery, with additional dialogue by Maurice Hanline, from the screenplay for the 1935 French film Monsieur Sans-Gêne by Emeric Pressburger and René Pujol, which was based on the story "The Satyr" by Pressburger. The film was reissued in 1948 as Matinee Scandal.

== Plot ==
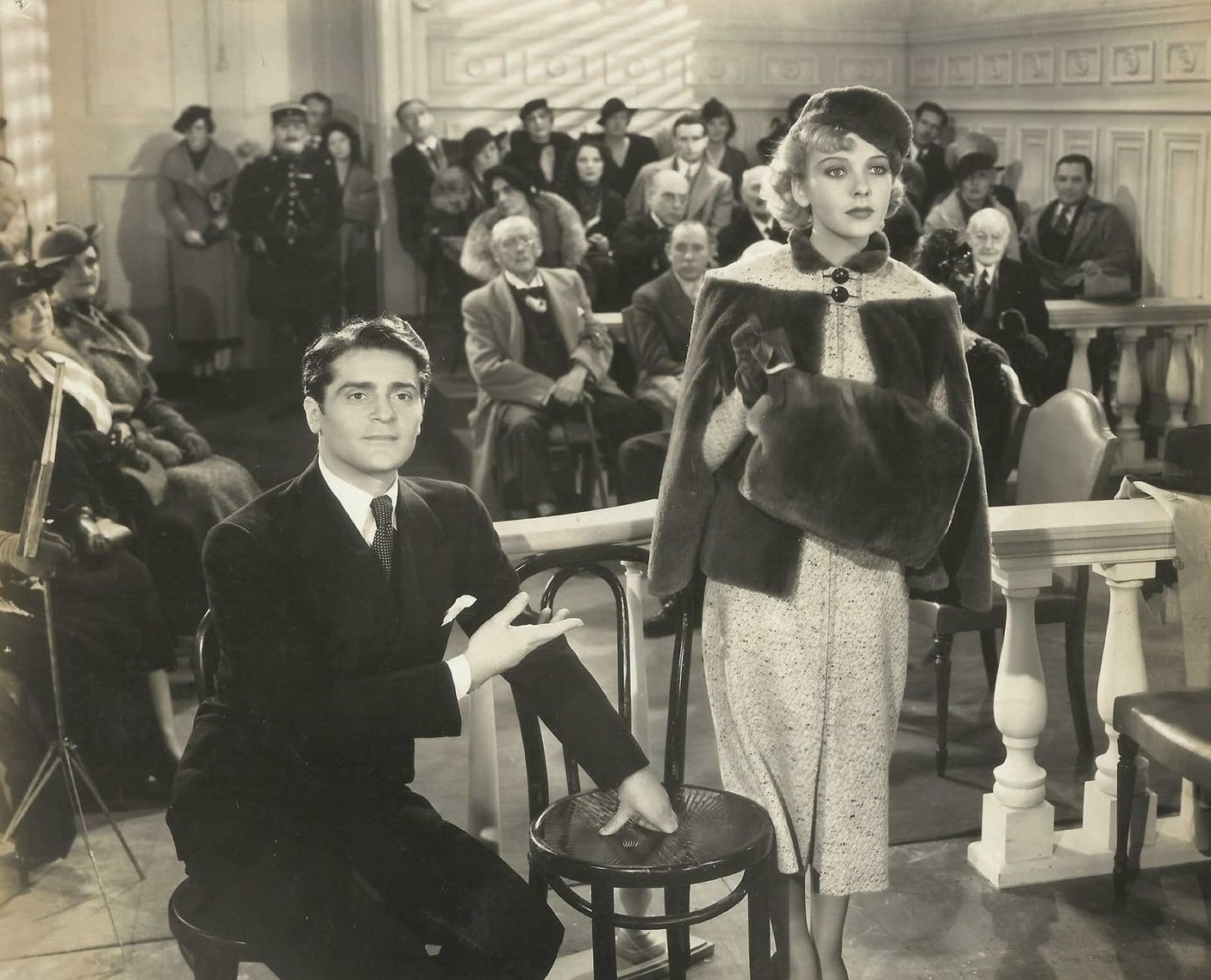
Francis Lederer and Ida Lupino in a publicity still for the film.

On a rainy afternoon in Paris, debonair actor Philippe Martin goes to a darkened movie theatre for a romantic assignation with his married mistress, Yvonne, but sits in the wrong seat and kisses instead lovely Monique Pelerin, the daughter of a powerful publisher. Monique, who is engaged to powerful Count Alfredo Donstelli, makes a public accusation against Philippe, and the priggish head of the Purity League exploits the incident until it becomes a national scandal, with Philippe dubbed "The Kissing Monster". When Philippe is tried, his defense is that he was overcome by Monique's beauty, and that it is a Frenchman's nature to be romantic, even to perfect strangers. His punishment is to spend just three days in jail, but when he is released, he discovers that Monique has paid his fine, supposedly to avoid more publicity, but actually because she is secretly attracted to him.

Meanwhile, the tabloids have made Philippe into a national hero, and instead of his producer, Maillot, firing the actor, he gets a raise. His new show will have him re-enact the kissing incident, but on the day of the opening Monique's father has him arrested, only be released when Yvonne, who turns out to be the wife of the Minister of Justice, convinces him to allow Philippe to do his performance, where Philippe learns that Monique has taken the place of the actress with whom he was to re-enact the kiss.

== Cast ==
- Francis Lederer as Philippe Martin
- Ida Lupino as Monique Pelerin
- Hugh Herbert as Toto
- Roland Young as Maillot
- Erik Rhodes as Count Alfredo Donstelli
- Joseph Cawthorn as Monsieur Pelerin
- Donald Meek as Judge
- Georgia Caine as Cecile
- Murray Kinnell as Theatre Manager
- Mischa Auer as Leading Man
- Richard Carle as Minister of Justice
- Phyllis Barry as Felice (Maillot's secretary)
- Lois January as Monsieur Pelerin's Secretary
- Eily Malyon as President of Purity League

== Songs ==
- "One Rainy Afternoon" – by Ralph Erwin (music) and Jack Stern (lyrics)
- "Secret Rendezvous" – by Ralph Erwin (music) and Preston Sturges (lyrics)

== Production ==
One Rainy Afternoon was the first of a small number of United Artists sound films which were produced by its vice-president, Mary Pickford, and the first film for Pickford-Lasky Productions. This film also marked Francis Lederer's first starring role for the studio.

United Artists ran an advertisement in The Hollywood Reporter with "thank-you's" to executives from other studios who allowed their stars to appear in One Rainy Afternoon. The ad states: "We are returning these artists to you with increased box office value."

The film began production in early January 1936. It was released on May 13 of that year, and re-released in January 1948. The film was made for an estimated $511,383, and grossed $603,903 worldwide.

== Reception ==
Writing for The Spectator in 1936, Graham Greene gave the film a poor review and described it as a film whose "wings don't work". Criticizing director Rowland Lee as "giv[ing] a useful demonstration of how not to direct this kind of story", and characterizing Lederer's acting as "embarrassing", Greene found that at least for Lupino's contribution to the film "she is one of the more agreeable screen dummies to whom things are made to happen".
