= Jack N. Young =

American stunt performer and location manager (1926–2018)

- Born: September 25, 1926; Fincastle, Virginia, US
- Died: September 12, 2018; Tucson, Arizona, US

Jack Norwood Young (September 25, 1926 – September 12, 2018) was an American stunt performer and location manager who worked on many westerns and adventure movies from 1947 to 2006.

Often uncredited, his work includes Winchester '73, High Noon, Hondo, The Tall Men, The Searchers, 3:10 to Yuma, The Alamo, How The West Was Won and 70 more movies.

Young also worked as a location manager on more than fifty notable movies including Joe Kidd, Tom Horn and Cannonball Run II. Young died on September 12, 2018, at the age of 91.

== Filmography ==
Year	Title	Role	Notes
1959	Rio Bravo	Gunman Shot by Dude in Saloon	Uncredited
1988	Midnight Run	Amarillo Desk Sergeant	
