= Millard Mitchell =

American character actor (1903–1953)

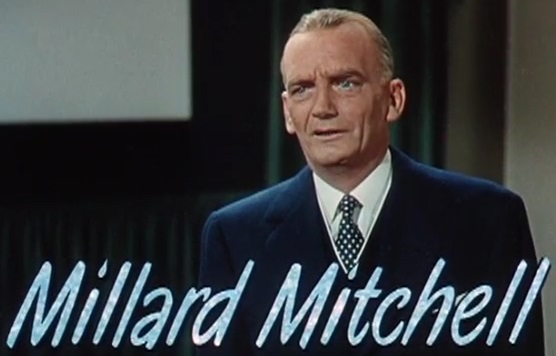
- Mitchell in Singin' in the Rain, 1952
- Born: August 14, 1903; Havana, Cuba
- Died: October 13, 1953 (aged 50); Santa Monica, California, U.S.
- Resting place: Holy Cross Cemetery, Culver City, California
- Occupation: Actor
- Years active: 1924–1953
- Spouse: Peggy Gould (m. 1942)
- Children: 2

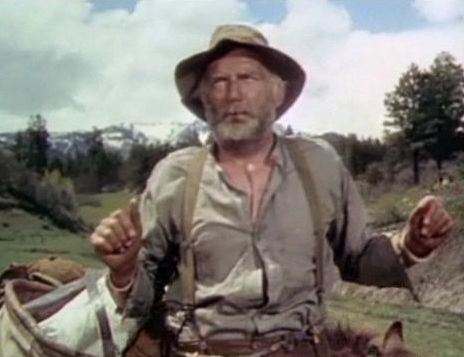
Mitchell in The Naked Spur, 1953

Millard Mitchell (August 14, 1903 – October 13, 1953) was a Cuban-born American character actor whose credits include roughly 30 feature films and two television appearances.

== Career ==
His first film appearance was in Secrets of a Secretary (1931) and appeared as a bit player in eight films between 1931 and 1936. Mitchell returned to film work in 1942 after a six-year absence. Between 1942 and 1953, he was a successful supporting actor.

For his performance in the film My Six Convicts (1952), Mitchell won the Golden Globe Award for Best Supporting Actor – Motion Picture. He is also remembered for his role as Col. Rufus Plummer in Billy Wilder's A Foreign Affair (1948), as Gregory Peck's commanding officer in the war drama Twelve O'Clock High (1949), High-Spade Frankie Wilson in Winchester '73 (1950), as the fictional movie mogul R.F. Simpson in the musical comedy Singin' in the Rain (1952), and as a hapless old prospector in The Naked Spur (1953).

Mitchell appeared frequently on Broadway, often playing a fast-talking Broadway character. He played the starring role in The Great Campaign (1947).

== Personal life ==
Mitchell was born to American parents in Havana, Cuba. He married actress Peggy Gould in 1942; the couple had two daughters, Mary Ellis and Margaret. Their daughter Maggie Schpak is a noted Hollywood jewelry designer. Their granddaughter Margaret Mitchell is a noted computer scientist.

Mitchell died at the age of 50 in 1953 from lung cancer at St. John's Hospital in Santa Monica, California, and was interred in Holy Cross Cemetery in Culver City, California.

== Filmography ==
- Secrets of a Secretary (1931) as Policeman (uncredited)
- My Sin (1931) as Trooper (uncredited)
- A Lesson in Love (1931) as Freshman (uncredited)
- The Cheat (1931) as Courtroom Spectator (uncredited)
- Dynamite Delaney (1936)
- Mr. and Mrs. North (1942) as Detective Mullins
- Grand Central Murder (1942) as Arthur Doolin
- The Mayor of 44th Street (1942) as Herman
- Little Tokyo, U.S.A. (1942) as George 'Sleepy' Miles (uncredited)
- The Big Street (1942) as Gentleman George (uncredited)
- Get Hep to Love (1942) as McCarthy
- Dixie Dugan (1943) as Accident Victim (uncredited)
- Slightly Dangerous (1943) as Baldwin
- Swell Guy (1946) as Steve
- Kiss of Death (1947) as Detective Shelby (uncredited)
- A Double Life (1947) as Al Cooley
- A Foreign Affair (1948) as Col. Rufus J. Plummer
- Thieves' Highway (1949) as Ed Kinney
- Everybody Does It (1949) as Mike Craig
- Twelve O'Clock High (1949) as Major General Pritchard
- The Gunfighter (1950) as Marshall Mark Strett
- Louisa (1950) as Photo of David Norton (uncredited)
- Winchester '73 (1950) as High-Spade Frankie Wilson
- Convicted (1950) as Malloby
- Mister 880 (1950) as "Mac" McIntire
- You're in the Navy Now (1951) as Chief George Larrabee
- Strictly Dishonorable (1951) as Bill Dempsey
- The Day the Earth Stood Still (1951) as General (uncredited)
- My Six Convicts (1952) as James Connie
- Singin' in the Rain (1952) as R. F. Simpson
- The Naked Spur (1953) as Jesse Tate
- Here Come the Girls (1953) as Albert Snodgrass (released posthumously)
