= Sunset of Power =

1936 film by Ray Taylor

- Directed by: Ray Taylor
- Screenplay by: Earle Snell
- Story by: J.E. Grinstead
- Produced by: Buck Jones
- Starring: Buck Jones; Dorothy Dix; Charles Middleton; Donald Kirke; Ben Corbett; Charles King
- Cinematography: Herbert Kirkpatrick; Allen Q. Thompson
- Edited by: Bernard Loftus
- Production company: Universal Pictures
- Distributed by: Universal Pictures
- Release date: January 22, 1936
- Running time: 66 minutes
- Country: United States
- Language: English

Sunset of Power is a 1936 American Western film directed by Ray Taylor, written by Earle Snell, and starring Buck Jones, Dorothy Dix, Charles Middleton, Donald Kirke, Ben Corbett and Charles King. It was released on January 22, 1936, by Universal Pictures.

== Cast ==
- Buck Jones as Cliff Lea
- Dorothy Dix as Ruth Brannum
- Charles Middleton as Neil Brannum
- Donald Kirke as Page Cothran
- Ben Corbett as Red
- Charles King as Jim Coley
- W. E. Lawrence as Bud Rolfe
- Nina Campana as Rosita
- Murdock MacQuarrie as Doctor
- Eumenio Blanco as Andreas
- Allan Sears as Henchman Mack
- Robert McKenzie as Storekeeper
- Joe De La Cruz as Indian Joe
