= Honolulu Lu =

1941 film by Charles Barton

- Theatrical release poster
- Directed by: Charles Barton
- Written by: Eliot Gibbons
- Screenplay by: Paul Yawitz; Eliot Gibbons; Ned Dandy
- Produced by: Wallace MacDonald
- Starring: Lupe Vélez; Bruce Bennett; Leo Carrillo; Marjorie Gateson; Don Beddoe; Forrest Tucker
- Cinematography: Franz Planer
- Edited by: James Sweeney
- Music by: Saul Chaplin; Sammy Cahn
- Production company: Columbia Pictures
- Distributed by: Columbia Pictures
- Release date: December 11, 1941
- Running time: 72 minutes
- Country: United States
- Language: English

Honolulu Lu is a 1941 American musical comedy film directed by Charles Barton and written by Eliot Gibbons. The film stars Lupe Vélez, Bruce Bennett, Leo Carrillo, Marjorie Gateson, Don Beddoe and Forrest Tucker. The film was released December 11, 1941, by Columbia Pictures.

== Plot ==
In Hawaii, Consuelo Cordoba is a risque nightclub act and due to her involvement with a group of sailors becomes a beauty queen.

== Cast ==
- Lupe Vélez as Consuelo Cordoba
- Bruce Bennett as Skelly
- Leo Carrillo as Don Estaban Cordoba
- Marjorie Gateson as Mrs. Van Derholt
- Don Beddoe as Bennie Blanchard
- Forrest Tucker as Barney
- George McKay as Horseface
- Nina Campana as Aloha
- Roger Clark as Bill Van Derhoolt
- Helen Dickson as Mrs. Smythe
- Curtis Railing as Mrs. Frobisher

== Bibliography ==
- Fetrow, Alan G. Feature Films, 1940-1949: a United States Filmography. McFarland, 1994.
