= Nina Campana =

American actress

- Born: Esperanza Susanna de Ybarrondo; December 23, 1897; Los Angeles, California, U.S.
- Died: June 21, 1950 (age 52); Venice, California, U.S.
- Other names: Nena Campana, Nina Wolfskill
- Occupation: Actress

Nina Campana (December 23, 1897 – June 21, 1950), born Esperanza Susanna de Ybarrondo, was an American film actress.

== Biography ==
Esperanza de Ybarrondo was born in Los Angeles, the daughter of Tomas de Ybarrondo and Vicenta Botiller (later Wucherer). Her father was a medical doctor, who died when Esperanza was very young. Ybarrondo was married first to Italian singer Ettore Campana, in 1922; they divorced in 1938. Her second husband was Martin A. Wolfskill. Campana died in 1950, at the age of 52, in Venice, California.

== Filmography ==
Campana usually played small roles as Latina women, but she was also cast as Polynesian, Native American, or Italian characters. In addition to her credited roles, Campana had dozens of uncredited film appearances in the 1930s and 1940s, including a Three Stooges short, "Pardon My Scotch" (1935). She toured nationally in a 1945 comedy, The Bad Man, in a production starring Leo Carrillo.

- The Suspect (1944)
- Can't Help Singing (1944)
- Call of the South Seas (1944)
- Tortilla Flat (1942)
- Honolulu Lu (1941)
- Arizona (1940)
- South of Pago Pago (1940)
- Outlaw Express (1938)
- Call of the Yukon (1938)
- It Could Happen to You (1937)
- Man of the People (1937)
- Night Key (1937)
- Rootin' Tootin' Rhythm (1937)
- It Happened Out West (1937)
- White Legion (1936)
- The Petrified Forest (1936)
- Sunset of Power (1936)
- The Melody Lingers On (1935)
- A Night at the Opera (1935)
- Hi Nellie! (1934)
