= The Naked Spur =

1953 film by Anthony Mann

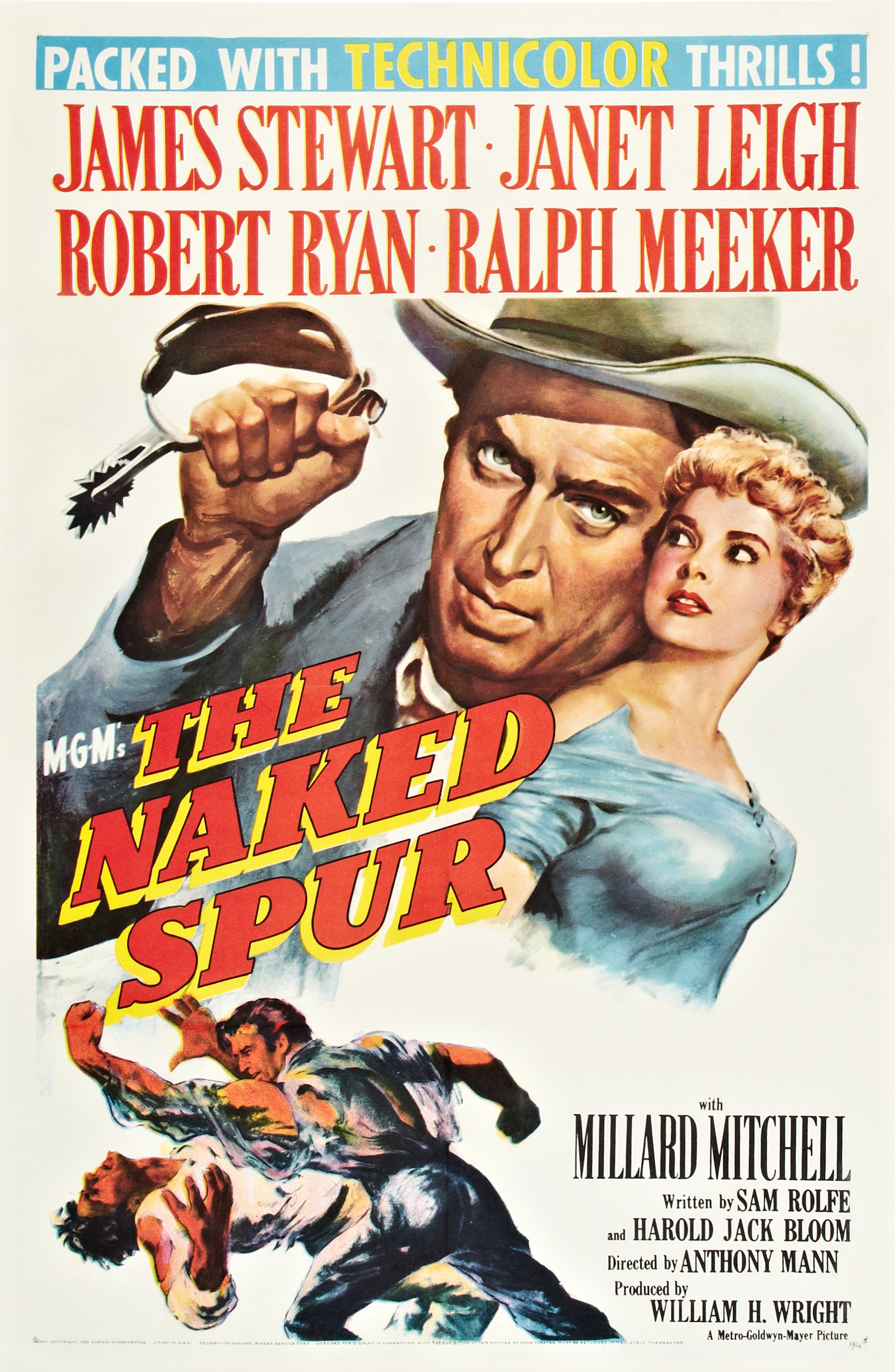
- Theatrical release poster
- Directed by: Anthony Mann
- Written by: Sam Rolfe; Harold Jack Bloom
- Produced by: William H. Wright
- Starring: James Stewart; Janet Leigh; Robert Ryan; Ralph Meeker; Millard Mitchell
- Cinematography: William C. Mellor
- Edited by: George White
- Music by: Bronisław Kaper
- Color process: Technicolor
- Production company: Metro-Goldwyn-Mayer
- Distributed by: Metro-Goldwyn-Mayer
- Release date: February 1, 1953
- Running time: 91 minutes
- Country: United States
- Language: English
- Budget: $1,261,000
- Box office: $3,850,000

The Naked Spur is a 1953 American Western film directed by Anthony Mann and starring James Stewart, Janet Leigh, Robert Ryan, Ralph Meeker, and Millard Mitchell. Written by Sam Rolfe and Harold Jack Bloom, the film is about a bounty hunter who tries to bring a murderer to justice, and is forced to accept the help of two strangers who are less than trustworthy.

The original music score was composed by Bronisław Kaper and the cinematography was by William C. Mellor. The Naked Spur was filmed on location in Durango and the San Juan Mountains in Colorado and in Lone Pine, California.

The film was nominated for the Academy Award for Best Original Screenplay—a rare honor for a Western. This was the third Western film collaboration between Anthony Mann and James Stewart. In 1997, The Naked Spur was selected for preservation in the United States National Film Registry, being deemed "culturally, historically, or aesthetically significant". In 2021, the film was released on Blu-ray in the North American region by Warner Bros. in their Archive Collection. The disc is supplemented by an audio commentary by Peter Bogdanovich, intercut with selections from an audio interview with Mann.

== Plot ==
In 1868, in the Rocky Mountains in Colorado, Howard Kemp offers grizzled prospector Jesse Tate $20 for help tracking Ben Vandergroat, wanted for killing a marshal in Abilene, Kansas. Kemp shows him a torn "WANTED" poster. Tate assumes that Kemp is a sheriff.

An avalanche of rocks blocks their path. Kemp fires, provoking another rock slide. Roy Anderson, recently discharged from the 6th Cavalry, is attracted by the shots. Kemp asks to see his discharge: Anderson is "morally unstable".

Anderson scales a cliff face and catches Vandergroat. The outlaw's companion, Lina Patch, jumps in. Kemp and Tate stop the fight. Lina's father, killed robbing a bank in Abilene, was Vandergroat's friend.

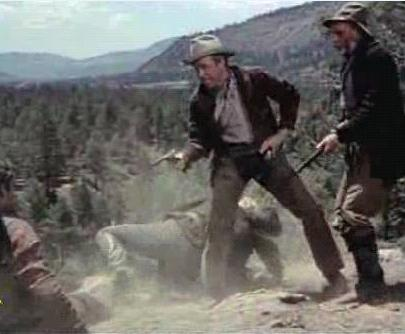
James Stewart and Millard Mitchell

Vandergroat reveals that Kemp is no lawman and that the bottom of the "WANTED" poster offers $5,000 to whoever brings him in "DEAD OR ALIVE." Tate and Anderson want their shares. Lina believes that Vandergroat is innocent. On the trail, Vandergroat wages a constant psychological campaign to turn his captors against each other by various means, starting with the observation that the reward will be larger divided by two.

Scouting a mountain pass, Kemp and Tate spot a dozen Blackfoot far from their normal territory. Anderson confesses that they are after him for raping the chief's daughter. Kemp tells Anderson to ride away, fast, so the rest of them will be safe. The Blackfoot catch up to Kemp's group, and when they all stop, Anderson shoots the chief from a hidden position.

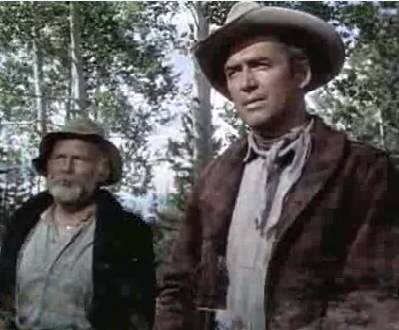
Millard Mitchell and James Stewart

During the ensuing battle, Kemp saves Vandergroat but is shot in the leg. Lina helps him to recover. They all ride on. When Kemp passes out, they make camp. Delirious, he thinks that he is leaving to fight in the Civil War and Lina is Mary, his fiancée. Strains of "Beautiful Dreamer" play.

Vandergroat explains that Kemp had signed his ranch over to Mary so that she could legally work it while he was fighting in the war. But when Kemp returned after the war, he found that Mary had sold his ranch out from under him and ran away with another man. Vandergroat adds that Kemp's one-third share of the reward money is not enough to buy back his ranch, and that they should worry. Lina tells Kemp that she is not “with” Vandergroat romantically. She has only seen him fighting fair and believes his promise of a ranch in California. Later, Vandergroat loosens Kemp's saddle cinch and pushes him over the edge of a steep mountain trail. A tree breaks his fall, and he crawls back up. That night, Vandergroat grins to see Kemp gently pull Lina's blanket over her.

They take refuge from a storm in a cave. Vandergroat tells Lina to distract Kemp so that he can escape through the back of the cave. The alternative: He will kill Kemp. The "Beautiful Dreamer" theme plays as Lina describes her dream of California, and Kemp reminisces about his ranch. They kiss. Vandergroat takes his chance. Kemp hauls him back. Anderson wants to kill Vandergroat since the reward is "Dead or Alive." Tate stops Anderson but, infuriated, Kemp challenges Vandergroat to a quick draw, which he refuses.

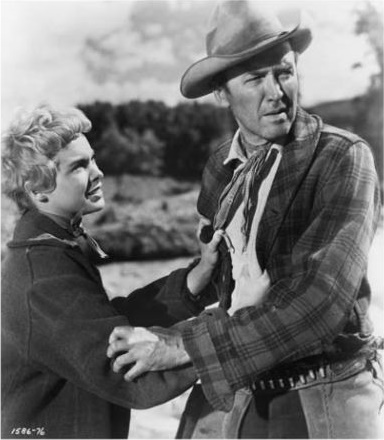
Janet Leigh and James Stewart

At the river, now running so high they must detour downstream, Anderson lassoes Vandergroat's neck, intending to drag the “sack of money” across. Kemp and Anderson fight. While Kemp and Anderson recover and Lina searches for firewood, Vandergroat offers Tate an irresistible temptation: a gold mine.

Tate helps Vandergroat and Lina escape. Vandergroat and Lina ride double; Tate follows, holding a rifle. Vandergroat yells "Snake!" and in the confusion, grabs the rifle. Vandergroat then shoots and kills Tate in cold blood, leaving his body where it will be seen by the others. Lina finally accepts the truth about him, and realizes that it was Vandergroat who had killed the marshal in Abilene.

Vandergroat fires on Kemp and Anderson from the cliff above, but Lina grabs the rifle barrel. While Anderson exchanges gunfire with Vandergroat, Kemp uses one of his spurs as a piton to climb the cliff and outflank Vandergroat.

Suspicious, Vandergroat rises to fire at Kemp. Kemp throws the spur into his cheek, and Anderson shoots Vandergroat. The body falls into the river and is entangled in the roots of dead trees lodged on the opposite bank. Anderson lassos a snag and crosses. He wraps the rope around Vandergroat's body but is killed by a giant floating log that drowns Anderson and takes his body down the river.

Kemp drags Vandergroat's body across the river and hoists it onto his horse, in a rage, vowing that he will take him back. Lina says she will go with him, no matter his choice, marry him, and live with him. Weeping, he declares one last time that he is taking him back. The "Beautiful Dreamer" theme soars. Calming, Kemp asks her if she still wants to try California. He begins to dig the grave, and she makes coffee.

== Cast ==
- James Stewart as Howard Kemp
- Janet Leigh as Lina Patch
- Robert Ryan as Ben Vandergroat
- Ralph Meeker as Roy Anderson
- Millard Mitchell as Jesse Tate

=== Stunt performers ===
Virginia Bougas, Ted Mapes, Frank McGrath, Chuck Roberson, Jack Williams, Jack N. Young.

== Production ==
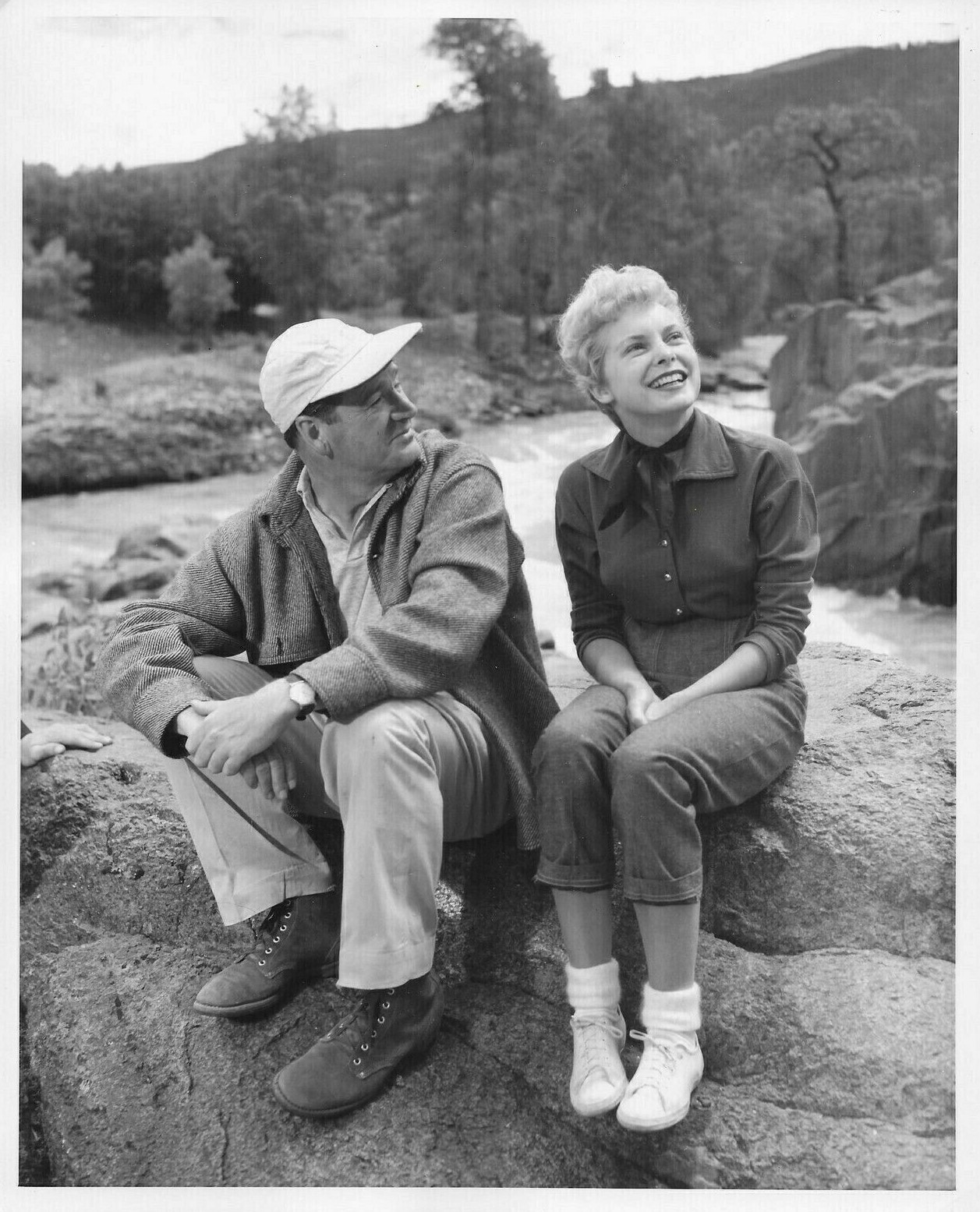
Anthony Mann and Janet Leigh

The Naked Spur was the third of five Western collaborations between James Stewart and Anthony Mann and the third of eight overall collaborations. The two previous Westerns were Winchester '73 (1950) and Bend of the River (1952). Stewart was given the lead role of Howard Kemp, an embittered rancher turned bounty hunter. The film is notable for having only five speaking parts. There were a number of parts of a band of Native Americans that were ambushed by Anderson.

Robert Ryan, known for his roles as ruthless villains and hard-boiled cops, was cast as Ben Vandergroat, a wild killer with a $5,000 "dead or alive" bounty on his head for the murder of a Kansas marshal. Ryan would work with Mann again in Men in War (1957) and God's Little Acre (1958). Janet Leigh was cast as Lina Patch, Vandergroat's companion who eventually falls in love with Kemp. Leigh starred alongside Ryan in the film noir Act of Violence (1948), which was directed by Fred Zinnemann. Ralph Meeker was cast as Roy Anderson, a disgraced Army officer.

Millard Mitchell, who played Jesse Tate, a grizzled old prospector, died at fifty years of age from lung cancer shortly after this picture. This was his next-to-last movie, followed by Here Come the Girls (released October 1953), starring Bob Hope.

The film was filmed in Lone Pine, California, and on location in the San Juan Mountains and Durango in Colorado. In an interview conducted in 1967, Mann described it as "magnificent countryside and everything lent itself to improvisation. I never understood why almost all westerns are shot in desert landscapes! John Ford, for example, adores Monument Valley, but I know Monument Valley very well and it’s not the whole West. In fact, the desert represents only one part of the American West. I wanted to show the mountains, the waterfalls, the forested areas, the snowy summits – in short to rediscover the whole Daniel Boone atmosphere: the characters emerge more fully from such an environment. In that sense the shooting of The Naked Spur gave me some genuine satisfaction."

According to writer and historian Frederic B. Wildfang during filming, Stewart dedicated a monument in town, marking the area as the "Hollywood of the Rockies". Production started in late May and ended in June 1952.

== Reception ==
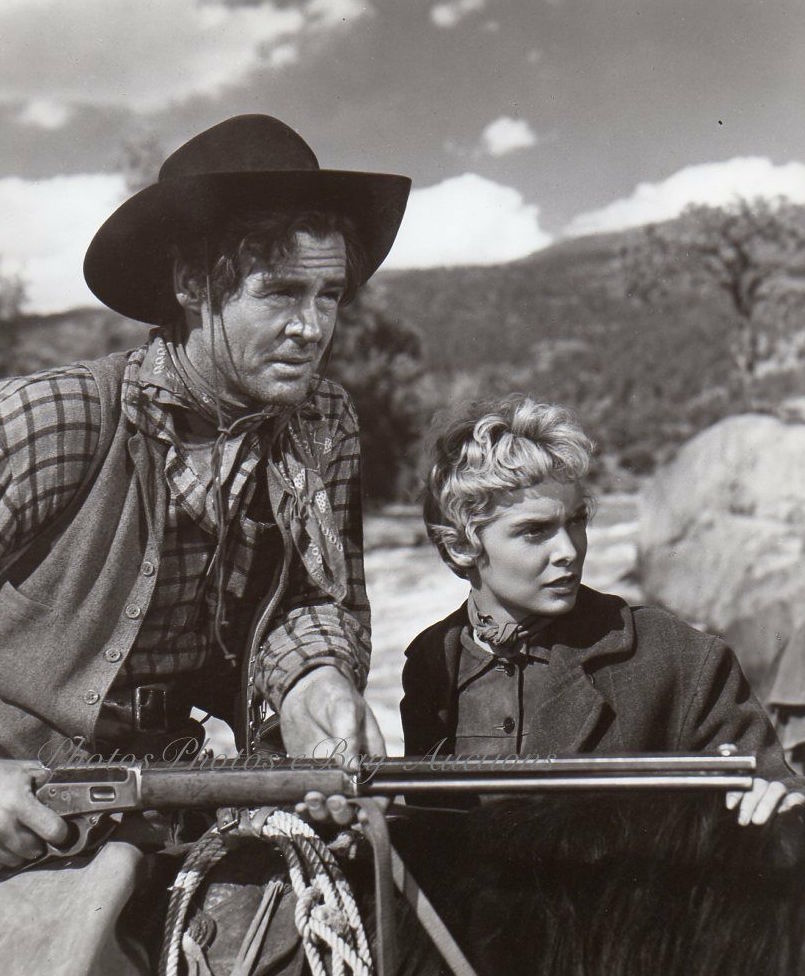
Robert Ryan and Janet Leigh

The film premiered in the first day of February 1953. That same year, two other films directed by Mann and starring Stewart were also released. These were Thunder Bay and The Glenn Miller Story.

Jonathan Rosenbaum would later hail The Naked Spur as a masterpiece as well as "Mann’s best and most elemental western," writing that it had "some of the most intense psychological warfare to be found in Mann’s angular and anguished oeuvre." Empire also hailed the movie as "a masterpiece that’s too easy to take for granted" and "the best of an outstanding run of Westerns."

The film currently holds a 100% rating on Rotten Tomatoes, based on 22 reviews.

According to MGM records the film earned $2,423,000 in the US and Canada and $1,427,000 overseas, resulting in a profit to the studio of $1,081,000.

This success ensured three more Stewart-Mann collaborations, including two more Westerns. Screenwriters Sam Rolfe and Harold Jack Bloom were nominated for the 1953 Best Screenplay Academy Award. In the years since its release, the film has achieved continued success, gaining more critical acclaim now than upon first release. Leonard Maltin has lauded The Naked Spur as "one of the best westerns ever made".

Although much is made of the collaboration between James Stewart and Anthony Mann, Robert Ryan also teamed with Mann in The Naked Spur, Men in War, and God's Little Acre.
