= The Man Who Shot Liberty Valance =

1962 American film directed by John Ford

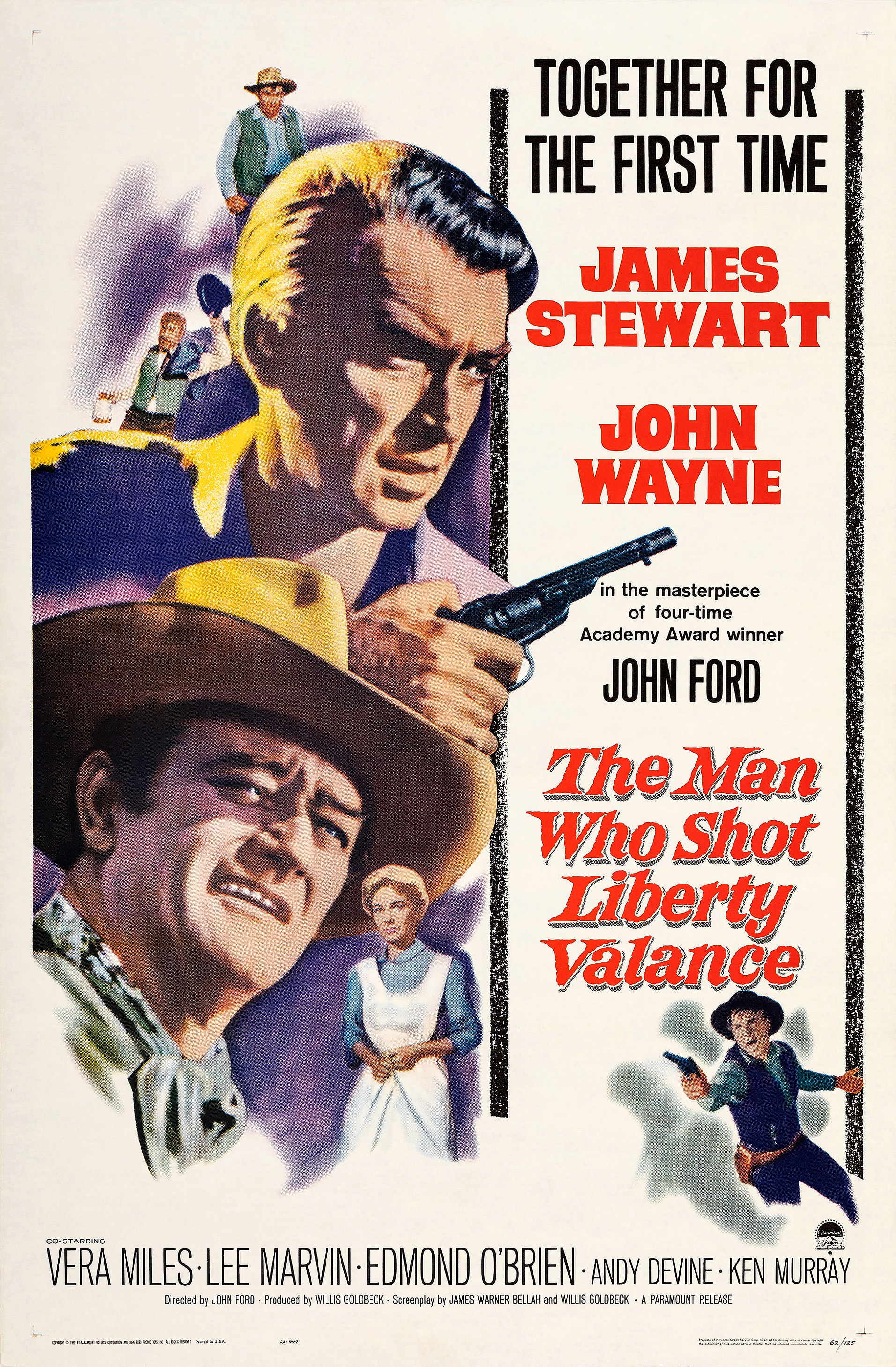
- Theatrical release poster
- Directed by: John Ford
- Screenplay by: James Warner Bellah; Willis Goldbeck
- Based on: "The Man Who Shot Liberty Valance" by Dorothy M. Johnson
- Produced by: Willis Goldbeck
- Starring: James Stewart; John Wayne; Vera Miles; Lee Marvin; Edmond O'Brien; Andy Devine; Ken Murray
- Cinematography: William H. Clothier
- Edited by: Otho Lovering
- Music by: Cyril J. Mockridge
- Color process: Black and white
- Production company: John Ford Productions
- Distributed by: Paramount Pictures
- Release date: April 22, 1962 (USA)
- Running time: 123 minutes
- Country: United States
- Language: English
- Budget: $3.2 million
- Box office: $8 million ($3.2 million US/Canada (rentals only))

The Man Who Shot Liberty Valance (/ˈvæləns/) is a 1962 black and white American Western film directed by John Ford and starring John Wayne and James Stewart in their first film together. The screenplay by James Warner Bellah and Willis Goldbeck was adapted from a 1949 short story written by Dorothy M. Johnson. The supporting cast features Vera Miles, Lee Marvin, Edmond O'Brien, Andy Devine, John Carradine, Woody Strode, Strother Martin, and Lee Van Cleef.

In 2007, the film was selected for preservation in the United States National Film Registry by the Library of Congress as being "culturally, historically, or aesthetically significant".

== Plot ==
Near the turn of the 20th century, U.S. Senator Ransom "Ranse" Stoddard and his wife Hallie arrive in Shinbone, a frontier town in an unnamed Western state, to attend the funeral of Tom Doniphon. When asked by the local newspaper reporter why a senator would attend the funeral of a poor rancher, Stoddard answers with a story that flashes back 25 years.

Entering the then-unincorporated territory (probably the future state of Colorado, as the Picketwire River is repeatedly mentioned throughout the story) as a young lawyer, Stoddard is beaten and robbed by infamous outlaw Liberty Valance and his gang. Tom Doniphon and his handyman, Pompey, find Stoddard and take him to Shinbone, where Doniphon's girlfriend, Hallie, treats his wounds. Stoddard learns Valance frequently terrorizes Shinbone and the surrounding country since the local marshal, Link Appleyard, is too cowardly to stop him. Doniphon says Valance only understands force, but Stoddard is determined to bring Valance to justice through the law.

While establishing his practice, Stoddard buses tables at Peter Ericson's steakhouse, where Hallie works, and befriends Dutton Peabody, the editor of the Shinbone Star newspaper. After learning Hallie is illiterate, Stoddard opens a school for children and adults in the back of the newspaper's office. He also begins practicing with Peabody's old gun after Valance bullies him in the restaurant. Hallie tells Doniphon of Stoddard's gun practice. Doniphon takes Stoddard to his ranch for a shooting lesson, shows off renovations that are intended for his planned marriage to Hallie, and makes those intentions clear to Stoddard. During the lesson, he tricks Stoddard by shooting a paint can above his head and staining his clothes, telling Stoddard he can expect the same kind of trickery from Valance. Stoddard angrily punches Doniphon and leaves.

Shinbone's men meet to elect two delegates to the upcoming statehood convention at the territorial capital. Doniphon refuses Stoddard's nomination; ultimately, Stoddard and Peabody are elected. Valance, hired by the cattle barons who oppose statehood, fails to intimidate the voters into selecting him. Valance challenges Stoddard to a gunfight. Doniphon offers to assist Stoddard in leaving town, but Stoddard stubbornly declines.

That evening, Valance and his gang vandalize the newspaper office and severely injure Peabody for reporting Valance's murder of a local farmer. Stoddard arms himself and goes after Valance; even drunk, Valance easily wounds and disarms Stoddard, then prepares to kill him. Stoddard retrieves his gun and shoots, and Valance falls dead. Stoddard returns to Ericson's, where Hallie treats his wounded arm; Doniphon enters and sees Hallie's affection for Stoddard as she attends his wounds. He becomes drunk and forces Appleyard to run Valance's men out of town. Seeing his unfinished home renovations, intended for his marriage to Hallie, Doniphon sets fire to his house and intends to die in the flames. Pompey rescues him and the livestock.

At the territorial convention, Stoddard is nominated for delegate to Congress, but withdraws after a representative of the cattle barons accuses him of building a career from murdering a man. Doniphon arrives and, in a nested flashback, explains to Stoddard that it was he who killed Valance; knowing that Stoddard could not beat Valance, Doniphon shot him with Pompey's rifle at the same time Stoddard fired. Doniphon encourages Stoddard to accept the nomination for Hallie's sake before quietly walking out of the convention.

In the present, after the extended flashback, Stoddard's political achievements over the years are revealed in his conversation with the newspaper editor – state governor, senator, ambassador to the United Kingdom, and likely vice-presidential nominee in the upcoming election. The editor decides that publishing the story about Stoddard and Valance would ruin Stoddard's legacy, burns the reporter's notes, and leaves Stoddard to conduct Doniphon's funeral. When Stoddard asks why, the editor says, "when the legend becomes fact, print the legend."

On the return trip to Washington, D.C., Stoddard contemplates retiring to Shinbone, which pleases Hallie. She admits to placing a cactus rose on Doniphon's coffin, a plant Doniphon knew Hallie liked. As Stoddard thanks the train conductor for the railroad's courtesies, the conductor answers, "Nothing's too good for the man who shot Liberty Valance!", which leaves Stoddard and Hallie in sad contemplation.

== Cast ==
- James Stewart as Ransom "Ranse" Stoddard
- John Wayne as Tom Doniphon
- Vera Miles as Hallie Stoddard
- Lee Marvin as Liberty Valance
- Edmond O'Brien as Dutton Peabody
- Andy Devine as Marshal Link Appleyard
- Ken Murray as Doc Willoughby
- John Carradine as Maj. Cassius Starbuckle
- Jeanette Nolan as Nora Ericson
- John Qualen as Peter Ericson
- Willis Bouchey as Jason Tully (train conductor)
- Carleton Young as Maxwell Scott
- Woody Strode as Pompey
- Denver Pyle as Amos Carruthers
- Strother Martin as Floyd (Valance's gang)
- Lee Van Cleef as Reese (Valance's gang)
- Robert F. Simon as Handy Strong
- O. Z. Whitehead as Herbert Carruthers
- Paul Birch as Mayor Winder
- Joseph Hoover as Charlie Hasbrouck
- Shug Fisher as Kaintuck

== Production ==
Publicity stills from The Man Who Shot Liberty Valance

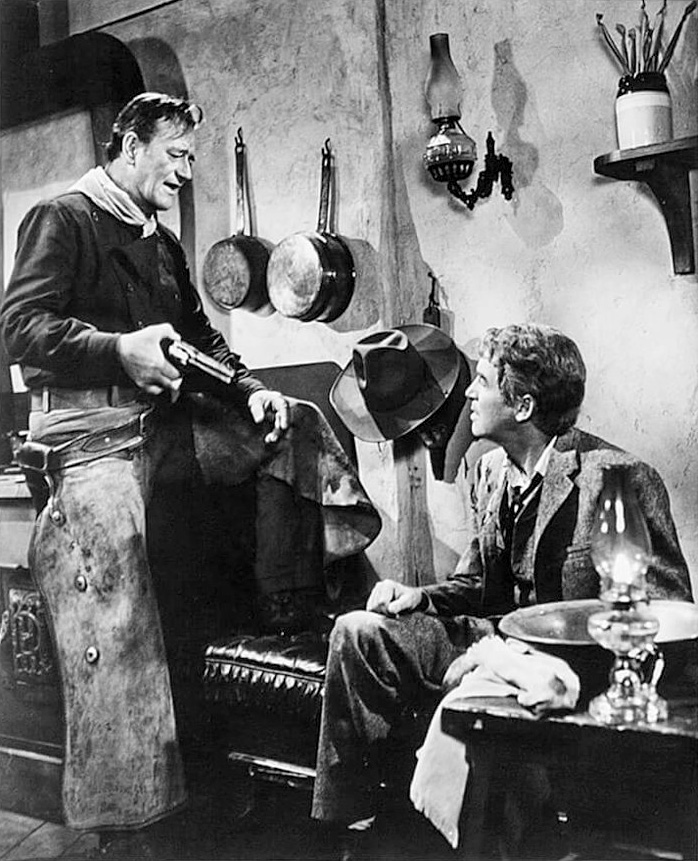
John Wayne and James Stewart

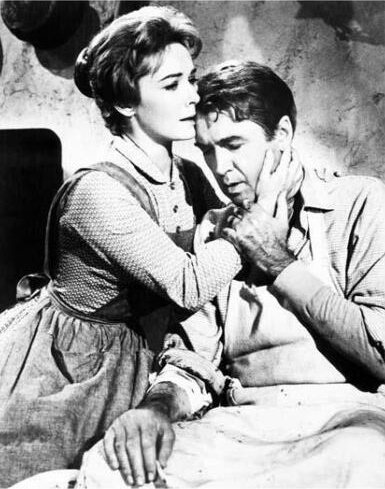
Vera Miles and Stewart

In contrast to prior John Ford Westerns, such as The Searchers (1956) and She Wore a Yellow Ribbon (1949), The Man Who Shot Liberty Valance was shot in black-and-white on Paramount's soundstages. Many stories and speculations exist to explain this decision. Ford preferred that medium over color: "In black and white, you've got to be very careful. You've got to know your job, lay your shadows in properly, get your perspective right, but in color, there it is," he said. "You might say I'm old fashioned, but black and white is real photography." Ford also reportedly argued that the climactic shoot-out between Valance and Stoddard would not have worked in color.

Others have interpreted the absence of the magnificent outdoor vistas so prevalent in earlier Ford Westerns as "a fundamental reimagining [by Ford] of his mythic West" – a grittier, less romantic, more realistic portrayal of frontier life. Wayne and Stewart, two of Hollywood's biggest stars working together for the first time, were considerably older (54 and 53, respectively) than the characters they were playing. Filming in black and white helped ease the suspension of disbelief necessary to accept that disparity. According to cinematographer William H. Clothier, however, "There was one reason and one reason only ... Paramount was cutting costs. Otherwise we would have been in Monument Valley or Brackettville and we would have had color stock. Ford had to accept those terms or not make the film."

Another condition imposed by the studio, according to Van Cleef, was that Wayne be cast as Doniphon. Ford resented the studio's intrusion and retaliated by taunting Wayne relentlessly throughout the filming. "He didn't want Duke [Wayne] to think he was doing him any favors," Van Cleef said. Strode recounted that Ford "kept needling Duke about his failure to make it as a football player", comparing him to Strode (a former NFL running back), whom he pronounced "a real football player". (Wayne's football career at USC had been curtailed by injuries.) He also ridiculed Wayne for failing to enlist during World War II, during which Ford filmed a series of widely praised combat documentaries for the Office of Strategic Services and was wounded at the Battle of Midway, and Stewart served with distinction as a bomber pilot and commanded a bomber group. "How rich did you get while Jimmy was risking his life?" he demanded. Wayne's avoidance of wartime service was a major source of guilt for him in his later years.

Stewart related that midway through filming, Wayne asked him why he, Stewart, never seemed to be the target of Ford's venomous remarks. Other cast and crew members also noticed Stewart's apparent immunity from Ford's abuse. Then, toward the end of filming, Ford asked Stewart what he thought of Strode's costume for the film's beginning and end, when the actors were playing their parts 25 years older. Stewart replied, "It looks a bit Uncle Remussy to me." Ford responded, "What's wrong with Uncle Remus?" He called for the crew's attention and announced, "One of our players doesn't like Woody's costume. Now, I don't know if Mr. Stewart has a prejudice against Negroes, but I just wanted you all to know about it." Stewart said he "wanted to crawl into a mouse hole", but Wayne told him, "Well, welcome to the club. I'm glad you made it."

Ford's behavior "really pissed Wayne off," Strode said, "but he would never take it out on Ford," the man largely responsible for his rise to stardom. "He ended up taking it out on me." While filming an exterior shot on a horse-drawn cart, Wayne almost lost control of the horses and knocked Strode away when he attempted to help. When the horses did stop, Wayne tried to pick a fight with the younger and fitter Strode. Ford called out, "Don't hit him, Woody, we need him." Wayne later told Strode, "We gotta work together. We both gotta be professionals." Strode blamed Ford for nearly all the friction on the set. "What a miserable film to make," he added.

Stewart received top billing over Wayne on promotional posters and in the trailers, but in the film itself, Wayne's screen card appears first and slightly higher on a sign post. The studio also specified that Wayne's name appear before Stewart's on theatre marquees, reportedly at Ford's request. "Wayne actually played the lead," Ford said, to Peter Bogdanovich. "Jimmy Stewart had most of the sides [sequences with dialogue], but Wayne was the central character, the motivation for the whole thing."

Parts of the film were shot in Wildwood Regional Park in Thousand Oaks, California.

== Music ==
The film's music score was composed by Cyril J. Mockridge, but in scenes involving Hallie's relationships with Doniphon and Stoddard, Ford reprised Alfred Newman's "Ann Rutledge Theme", from Young Mr. Lincoln. He told Bogdanovich that he used the theme in both films to evoke repressed desire and lost love. Film scholar Kathryn Kalinak notes that Ann Rutledge's theme "encodes longing" and "fleshes out the failed love affair between Hallie and Tom Doniphon, the growing love between Hallie and Ranse Stoddard, and the traumatic loss experienced by Hallie over her choice of one over the other, none of which is clearly articulated by dialogue." Portions of the song "There'll Be a Hot Time in the Old Town Tonight" are played in scenes by bar musicians and a marching band.

Mockridge's main theme that opens the picture can also be heard, in a somewhat different form, in a trailer for River of No Return with Robert Mitchum and Marilyn Monroe released in 1953.

The Burt Bacharach-Hal David song "(The Man Who Shot) Liberty Valance" became a top-10 hit for Gene Pitney. Though based upon the movie's plotline, it was not used in the film. Pitney said in an interview that he was in the studio about to record the song when "... Bacharach informed us that the film just came out." It seems unlikely that the song would be used for the opening credits, since its lyrics give the film's surprise ending away. The picture was released April 18, 1962, and the song entered the Billboard Hot 100 the week ending April 28, 1962, peaking at number four in June. Jimmie Rodgers also recorded the song, in the Gene Pitney style. James Taylor covered it on his 1985 album That's Why I'm Here, as did The Royal Guardsmen on their 1967 album Snoopy vs. the Red Baron. It was also covered by Australian rock band Regurgitator on their 1998 David/Bacharach tribute album To Hal and Bacharach. In 2010, the Western Writers of America chose it as one of the top 100 Western songs of all time.

== Reception ==
The Man Who Shot Liberty Valance was released in April 1962, and achieved both financial and critical success. Produced for $US3.2 million, it grossed $8 million, making it the 15th-highest grossing film of 1962. According to Kinematograph Weekly, the film was considered a "money maker" at the British box office in 1962.

Edith Head's costumes were nominated for an Academy Award for Best Costume Design (black-and-white), one of the few Westerns ever nominated in that category.

Contemporary reviews were generally positive, although a number of critics thought the final act was a letdown. Variety called the film "entertaining and emotionally involving," but thought if the film had ended 20 minutes earlier, "it would have been a taut, cumulative study of the irony of heroic destiny," instead of concluding with "condescending, melodramatic, anticlimactic strokes. What should have been left to enthrall the imagination is spelled out until there is nothing left to savor or discuss."

The Monthly Film Bulletin agreed, lamenting that the "final anticlimactic 20 minutes ... all but destroy the value of the disarming simplicity and natural warmth which are Ford's everlasting stock-in-trade." Despite this, the review maintained that the film "has more than enough gusto to see it through," and that Ford had "lost none of his talent for catching the real heart, humor, and violent flavor of the Old West in spite of the notable rustiness of his technique." A. H. Weiler of The New York Times wrote, "Mr. Ford, who has struck more gold in the West than any other film-maker, also has mined a rich vein here," but opined that the film "bogs down" once Stoddard becomes famous, en route to "an obvious, overlong, and garrulous anticlimax."

Richard L. Coe of The Washington Post called the film "a leisurely yarn boasting fine performances," but was bothered by "the incredulous fact that the lively townsfolk of Shinbone didn't polish off Valence [sic] for themselves. On TV, he would have been dispatched by the second commercial, and the villainy would have passed to some shadowy employer, some ruthless rancher who didn't want statehood." John L. Scott of the Los Angeles Times wrote, "Director Ford is guilty of a few lengthy, slow periods in his story-telling, but for the most part the old, reliable Ford touches are there." Harrison's Reports gave the film a grade of "Very Good", but Brendan Gill of The New Yorker was negative and called it "a parody of Mr. Ford's best work."

More recent assessments have been more uniformly positive. The film is considered one of Ford's best, and in one poll, ranked with The Searchers and The Shootist as one of Wayne's best Westerns. Roger Ebert wrote that each of the 10 Ford/Wayne westerns is "... complete and self-contained in a way that approaches perfection", and singled out Liberty Valance as "the most pensive and thoughtful" of the group. Jack Hawkins of Slash Film named Liberty Valance the best feature of John Wayne's career, praising the film's meditations on violence, the state and the individual.

Director Sergio Leone (Once Upon a Time in the West, The Good, the Bad and the Ugly) listed Ford as a major influence on his work, and Liberty Valance as his favorite Ford film. "It was the only film," he said, "where [Ford] learned about something called pessimism." In a retrospective analysis, The New York Times called Liberty Valance "...one of the great Western classics," because "it questions the role of myth in forging the legends of the West, while setting this theme in the elegiac atmosphere of the West itself, set off by the aging Stewart and Wayne."

The New Yorker's Richard Brody described it as "the greatest American political movie", because of its depictions of a free press, town meetings, statehood debates, and the "civilizing influence" of education in frontier America. According to scholar Victor Bruno, the film uses the symbolism of the wilderness and the garden to represent the roles of the cowboy Doniphon and the civilized Stoddard. Bruno points out that after allowing Stoddard to receive the credit for Valance's death, Doniphon "sets fire to his own house, bringing about a process akin to ekpyrosis that razes his existence to the ground. To the day of his death, Doniphon becomes an ossified man — literally a fossil of a being that lived in a previous era." However, contrary to most opinions about the film, Bruno believes that The Man Who Shot Liberty Valance is Ford's indictment of America's increasingly "antimythological" character. "It is not a wonder that Ford begins his 'Age of Mortality' with such a bleak picture. When the mystical storyteller starts to face death, he must highlight the imperfections of his environment, which is truly himself, so he can face death free of sins.

The film is recognized by American Film Institute in these lists:

- 2003: AFI's 100 Years...100 Heroes & Villains:
  - Tom Doniphon – Nominated Hero
- 2005: AFI's 100 Years...100 Movie Quotes:
  - Maxwell Scott: "This is the West, sir. When the legend becomes fact, print the legend." – Nominated
- 2008: AFI's 10 Top 10:
  - Nominated Western Film

== See also ==
- List of American films of 1962
- John Wayne filmography
- James Stewart filmography
