= The Great Campaign =

Play by Arnold Sundgaard

The Great Campaign is a 1947 play by Arnold Sundgaard.

The play tells the story of a farmer who runs for president of the United States because he objects to the other candidate, who was chosen by a phony politician. However, his son sabotages his campaign by turning his big speech over to his opponents, and the farmer is defeated.

The Great Campaign opened on Broadway at the Princess Theatre on March 30, 1947. It was produced by The Experimental Theatre, Inc. (formerly the Provincetown Players) and T. Edward Hambleton, supported by ANTA (The American National Theater and Academy, an entity chartered by the U.S. Congress to advance non-commercial theater in America).

Players included Millard Mitchell as Sam Trellis (the farmer/candidate), Thomas Coley as his son, and John O'Shaughnessy and Robert P. Lieb. The director was Joseph Losey, and choreography was by Anna Sokolow.

Billboard praised the music, dancing, acting, and direction, and particularly the innovative integration of music into the production, "taking a leaf out of Hollywood's book", but described the script as "wordy [and] diffuse" and stated "the play fails mainly because the characters never become real" because with 14 sets there is "so much action taking place in so many places [that the playwright] never gets a chance to build character".

The Great Campaign flopped, closing on April 7 after five performances.

The Great Campaign has not been staged often since its 1947 Broadway run. The University Players of George Washington University mounted a production in 1948.

== Notes ==
1. According to the Cambridge Guide to American Theatre, "Helen Tamiris... directed The Great Campaign (1947)". But Tamiris was a choreographer, not known to have directed any plays, and contemporary sources such as Playbill and Billboard list Joseph Losey as director and Anna Sokolow as choreographer of the Broadway production.
