= Winchester '73 =

1950 film by Anthony Mann

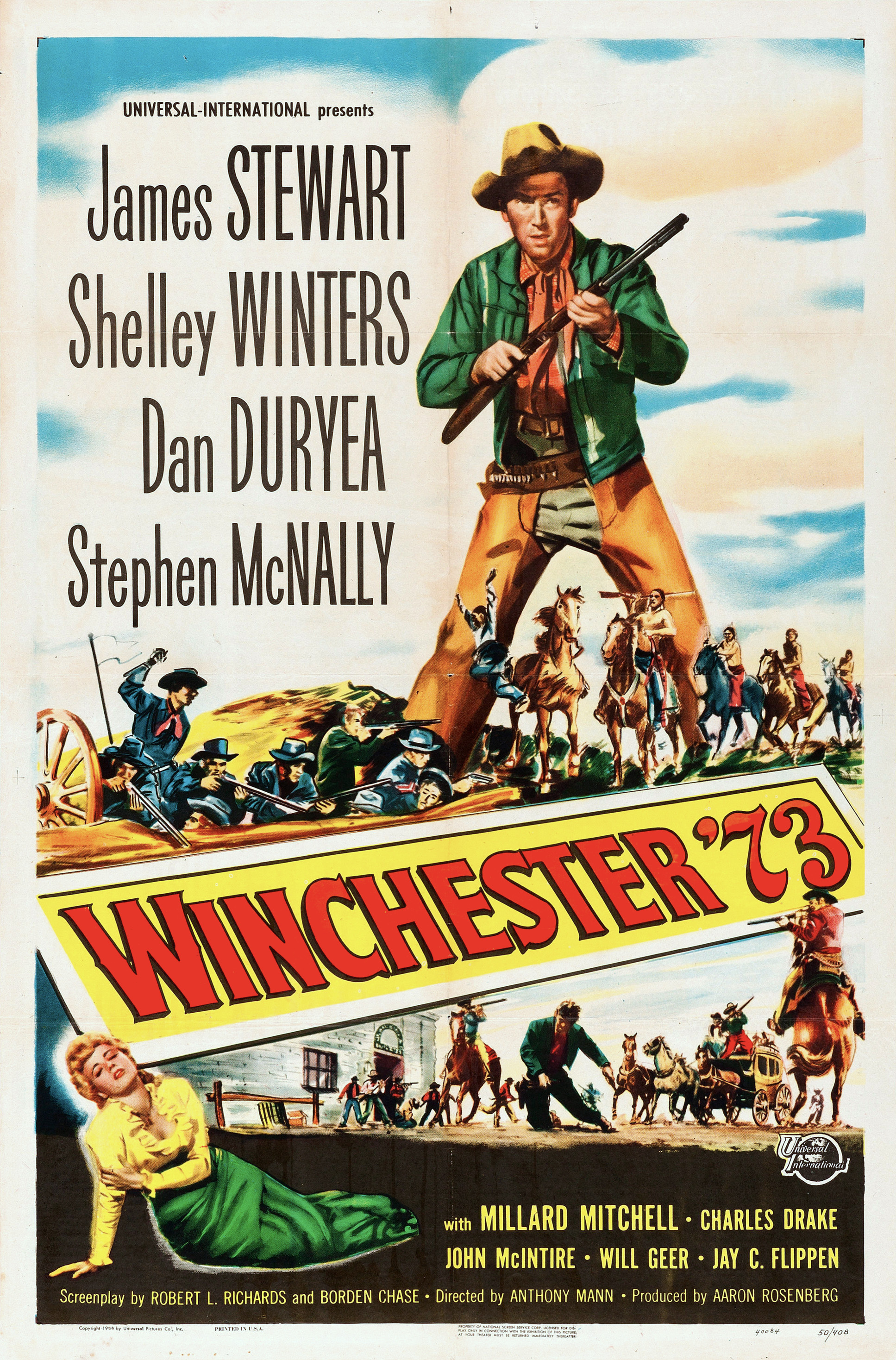
- Theatrical release poster by Reynold Brown
- Directed by: Anthony Mann
- Screenplay by: Borden Chase; Robert L. Richards
- Story by: Stuart N. Lake
- Produced by: Aaron Rosenberg
- Starring: James Stewart; Shelley Winters; Dan Duryea; Stephen McNally; Millard Mitchell; Charles Drake; John McIntire; Will Geer; Jay C. Flippen
- Cinematography: William H. Daniels
- Edited by: Edward Curtiss
- Music by: Joseph Gershenson (musical director)
- Color process: Black and white
- Production company: Universal Pictures
- Distributed by: Universal Pictures
- Release date: July 12, 1950
- Running time: 92 minutes
- Country: United States
- Language: English
- Box office: $2,250,000 (US rentals)

Winchester '73 is a 1950 American Western film noir starring James Stewart, Shelley Winters, Dan Duryea and Stephen McNally. Directed by Anthony Mann and written by Borden Chase and Robert L. Richards, the film is set in 1876 and follows the turbulent passing of a prized Winchester 1873 repeating rifle from one ill-fated owner to another interwoven with a cowboy's search for a murderous fugitive.

It is the first of eight films that Mann and Stewart made together, and is also the first film from which an actor received a percentage of the receipts, a practice known as "points", as compensation.

Along with Millard Mitchell and Charles Drake in featured support, Rock Hudson portrays a Native American tribal leader, and Tony Curtis appears as a besieged cavalry trooper, both in minor roles at the beginning of their careers.

The film received a Writers Guild of America Award nomination for Best Written American Western. In 2015, the United States Library of Congress selected the film for preservation in the National Film Registry, finding it "culturally, historically, or aesthetically significant".

== Plot ==
Lin McAdam and his pal "High Spade" arrive in Dodge City, Kansas, as a man is forcing a comely saloon pianist onto an out-of-town stage. Lin intervenes but backs down when he learns that the man is not only the local Marshall but the legendary Wyatt Earp. Lin is on the trail of Dutch Henry Brown to settle a score. They meet in a saloon but cannot draw on each other because of Earp's policy of confiscating all strangers' guns while they visit the town.

Both Lin and Dutch enter the community's Centennial shooting contest for a prized "One in One Thousand" Winchester 1873 repeating rifle. Lin and Dutch shoot much better than the locals, with Lin besting his gruff adversary in a shoot-off. Learning that Dutch and his pals are leaving, Lin goes to his room to pack. There, Dutch and his men ambush him, steal the rifle, and ride away before he and High Spade can retrieve their guns.

Arriving at Riker's inn, the trio finds Joe Lamont, an Indian trader, who eyes the fancy Winchester and becomes determined to secure it. He raises the prices of his guns and ammunition so that the Henry gang cannot afford them. After losing to Lamont at poker, Dutch is forced to trade the rifle to him for three hundred dollars plus their pick of weapons. Dutch tries to win the Winchester back by betting the wad in one pot, but is cleaned out by a stacked deck.

Lamont peddles his guns to his buyer, Young Bull, who rejects them as worn out and inferior. Spying the elaborately decorated Winchester, he seizes it and turns on Lamont, who is robbed, killed, and scalped.

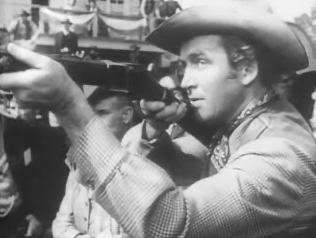
Lin McAdam (Jimmy Stewart) shooting in the rifle contest

Meanwhile, the saloon pianist, Lola, and her fiancé, Steve, are in a wagon traveling toward a new home. Pursued by Young Bull and his warriors, Steve panics, abandons Lola, and rides away alone on his horse. Discovering a small encampment of cavalry soldiers ahead, he rejoins Lola and, together, they race to the camp. That night, Lin and High Spade are also chased in and safely join the group.

Lin convinces the sergeant in charge that there will be no attack until morning. At dawn, he gives Lola his revolver, intimating that she should save the last round for herself in case of defeat. A fierce battle ensues, with Lin shooting Young Bull and spurring a rout. Returning his gun to Lin, Lola asks if she may keep the remaining bullet as a souvenir, which he grants. He and High Spade resume their pursuit of Dutch. Just after they leave, the coveted Winchester is found by a trooper, and the sergeant gives it to Steve.

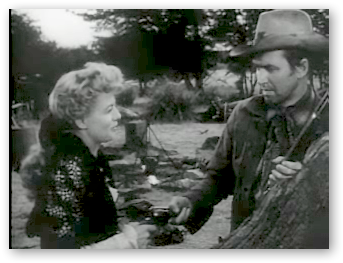
Lola Manners (Shelley Winters) accepting Lin McAdam's revolver just before the Indian attack

Steve and Lola reach the Jameson place, their future home. Steve has a rendezvous planned in Tascosa with Waco Johnny Dean, "the fastest gun in Texas," but Waco and his men instead arrive ahead of a posse that surrounds the house. When Waco sees the Winchester, he too covets it. Provoking Steve into drawing, Waco kills him. In a breakout, Waco's men are shot, but he and Lola escape and ride to Dutch's hideout outside Tascosa. Dutch sees the rifle and claims it is his, and Waco yields it without a fight, telling Lola he will get it back the same way that he got it from Steve; meanwhile, there is a payday to earn.

The gang goes to Tascosa to rob its bank and stagecoach. Lin and High Spade arrive ahead of the stage. Waco attempts to shoot Lin but is overpowered in a scrap and dropped by Lin's rifle. In the chaos, the heist goes awry, and Lola is accidentally wounded. Dutch escapes on horseback, with Lin in hot pursuit. High Spade reveals to Lola that Dutch is Lin's brother, who robbed a bank and stagecoach, returned home, and shot their father in the back when he refused to harbor him.

Dutch manages to scramble up a rocky bluff ahead of Lin, giving him the high ground. They shoot it out, trading ricochets, until Dutch makes a fatal mistake.

Lin's vendetta complete, he returns to Tascosa with the Winchester and reunites emotionally with High Spade and Lola, accepting her embrace and not letting go.

== Cast ==
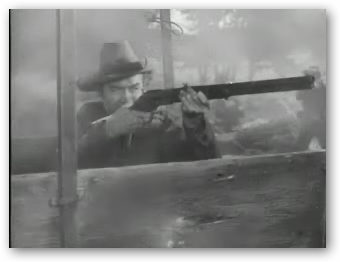
Stewart during the Indian attack

- James Stewart as Lin McAdam
- Shelley Winters as Lola Manners
- Dan Duryea as Waco Johnny Dean
- Stephen McNally as Dutch Henry Brown / Matthew McAdam
- Millard Mitchell as High-Spade Frankie Wilson
- Charles Drake as Steve Miller
- John McIntire as Joe Lamont
- Will Geer as Wyatt Earp
- Jay C. Flippen as Sergeant Wilkes
- Rock Hudson as Young Bull
- John Alexander as Jack Riker
- Steve Brodie as Wesley
- James Millican as Wheeler
- Abner Biberman as Latigo Means
- Tony Curtis as Dean (credited as "Anthony Curtis")
- James Best as Crater

== Production ==
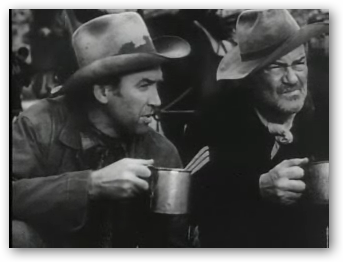
James Stewart and Jay C. Flippen

The film was originally intended to have been directed by Fritz Lang, but Universal did not want Lang to also produce it through his own company, Diana Productions. Lang's idea was for the rifle to be Stewart's character's only source of strength and his only excuse for living, making the quest for his rifle a matter of life and death.

With Lang out of the picture, Universal produced the film with up-and-coming Anthony Mann directing, Stewart's choice, as he had admired some of Mann's prior work. Mann had Borden Chase rewrite the script to instead make the rifle a bone of contention, showing it passing contentiously through the hands of various people.

Mann said, "I didn't like the property; I didn't like Winchester at all. This was Lang's version. I was working at Metro and everybody was pressuring me to make the film and I said, 'I'd like to make the film, if you let me rewrite it completely. I want a new writer, new everything; I don't want the property the way it is.' Finally, after a lot of haranguing, they agreed that I could do that and I brought in Borden Chase and we started from scratch on the script and it developed day by day."

Stewart had wished to make Harvey for Universal-International, but the studio could not afford his $200,000 salary ($2.06 million in today's dollars), so studio head William Goetz offered to allow Stewart to make both Harvey and Winchester '73 for a percentage of the profits, spread over some time and at a lower capital gain tax rate than a single payment to Stewart would be. Stewart's agent Lew Wasserman was able to get his client 50 percent of the profits, eventually amounting to $600,000 from the film's unexpected success. Stewart's deal also gave him control over the choice of the director and co-stars. It is acknowledged as the first confirmed time in the sound era that a film actor received some of the movie's receipts as compensation, a practice acquiring the term "points".

=== Casting ===
Stewart was already cast in the part of Lin McAdam and spent a lot of time practicing with the rifle so that he would look like an authentic Westerner. As Mann later related, "[Stewart] was magnificent walking down a street with a Winchester rifle cradled in his arm. And he was great too actually firing the gun. He studied hard at it. His knuckles were raw with practicing... It was those sorts of things that helped make the film look so authentic, gave it its sense of reality." An expert marksman from the Winchester company, Herb Parsons, did the trick shooting required for the film and assisted Stewart with his training.

Shelley Winters was cast as a saloon pianist. Winters did not understand the film, nor think much of her part in it, saying, "Here you've got all these men... running around to get their hands on this goddamn rifle instead of going after a beautiful blonde like me. What does that tell you about the values of that picture? If I hadn't been in it, would anybody have noticed?"

The part of Wyatt Earp was given to Will Geer, who was not alone by feeling that he was miscast for the role. Millard Mitchell was cast as High-Spade Frankie Wilson. That same year, Mitchell appeared in The Gunfighter starring Gregory Peck. He would appear in another Stewart-Mann Western The Naked Spur (1953) as a grizzled old prospector.

Jay C. Flippen appears as cavalry sergeant Wilkes. He would also appear in the second Stewart-Mann Western Bend of the River (1952) with Rock Hudson, who appears in Winchester '73 as a Native American.

The Stewart and Mann collaboration established a new persona for Stewart, more violent and disillusioned than ever before, but still likable.

=== Locations ===
Winchester '73 was filmed at:

- Mescal, Arizona, U.S.
- Old Tucson, 201 S. Kinney Road, Tucson, Arizona, U.S.
- Backlot, Universal Studios, 100 Universal City Plaza, Universal City, California, U.S.

== Reception ==
=== Release ===
As part of the publicity campaign for the release of the film, Universal Pictures sponsored a contest, by placing magazine ads, to find some of the rare remaining "One of One Thousand" Model 1873 Winchester rifles. This resulted in many previously unknown original rifles being brought into the spotlight, and drew public interest to the field of antique gun collecting. The winner of the contest received a new Winchester Model 1894 rifle, for the Model 1873 was out of production at that time.

=== Box office ===
The film was a financial success, turning a significant profit. It has since gained a reputation as a classic of the Western genre, and durably helped to redefine the public perception of James Stewart.

=== Critical response ===
Twenty-first century reviews have been enthusiastic. Writing for Empire in 2000, William Thomas called the film "the marvellously-scripted story of a man and a gun". He awarded five stars out of five.

In 2015 Martin Chilton of the Telegraph also gave the movie five stars out of five, describing it as "the first in a series of Western masterpieces".

The film holds a 100% rating on Rotten Tomatoes, based on 27 reviews, with an average of 8.5/10.

== Honors ==
The film received a Writers Guild of America Award nomination for Best Written American Western. In 2015, the United States Library of Congress selected the film for preservation in the National Film Registry, finding it "culturally, historically, or aesthetically significant".

== Remake ==
Winchester '73 was remade as a made-for-TV film in 1967 featuring Tom Tryon, John Saxon, Dan Duryea, John Drew Barrymore, Joan Blondell, John Dehner and Paul Fix.

== See also ==
- Babel, a non-linear film that features various owners of a prized rifle.
- Gun, a 1997 anthology television series following sequential owners of a semi-automatic pistol.
- The King's Ankus, a tale in Rudyard Kipling's The Second Jungle Book that follows a valuable object as it causes murderous acts.
