= Anthony Mann =

American film director (1906–1967)

- Born: Emil Anton Bundsmann; June 30, 1906; San Diego, California, U.S.
- Died: April 29, 1967 (aged 60); Berlin, Germany
- Occupations: Actor; director
- Years active: 1925–1967
- Spouses: Mildred Kenyon (m. 1936; div. 1957) Sara Montiel (m. 1957; div. 1963) Anna Kuzko (m. 1964)
- Children: 3

Anthony Mann (born Emil Anton Bundsmann; June 30, 1906 – April 29, 1967) was an American film director and stage actor. He came to prominence as a skilled director of film noir and Westerns, and for his historical epics.

Mann started as a theatre actor appearing in numerous stage productions. In 1937, he moved to Hollywood where he worked as a talent scout and casting director. He then became an assistant director, most notably working for Preston Sturges. His directorial debut was Dr. Broadway (1942). He directed several feature films for numerous production companies, including RKO Pictures, Eagle-Lion Films, Universal Pictures, and Metro-Goldwyn-Mayer (MGM). His first major success was T-Men (1947), garnering notable recognition for producing several films in the film noir genre through modest budgets and short shooting schedules. As a director, he often collaborated with cinematographer John Alton.

During the 1950s, Mann shifted to directing Western films starring several major stars of the era, including James Stewart. He directed Stewart in eight films, including Winchester '73 (1950), The Naked Spur (1953), and The Man from Laramie (1955). While successful in the United States, these films became appreciated and studied among French film critics, several of whom would become influential with the French New Wave. In 1955, Jacques Rivette hailed Mann as "one of the four great directors of postwar Hollywood". The other three were Nicholas Ray, Richard Brooks, and Robert Aldrich.

By the 1960s, Mann turned to large-scale filmmaking, directing the medieval epic El Cid (1961), starring Charlton Heston and Sophia Loren, and The Fall of the Roman Empire (1964). Both films were produced by Samuel Bronston. Mann then directed the war film The Heroes of Telemark (1965) and the spy thriller A Dandy in Aspic (1968). In 1967, Mann died from a heart attack in Berlin before he had finished the latter film; its star Laurence Harvey completed the film, albeit uncredited.

== Early life ==
Mann was born Emil Anton Bundsmann in San Diego, California. His father, Emile Theodore Bundsmann, an academic, was born in the village of Rosice, Chrudim, Bohemia to a Sudeten-German Catholic family. His mother, Bertha (née Waxelbaum/Weichselbaum), a drama teacher from Macon, Georgia, was an American of Bavarian Jewish descent. At the time of his birth, Mann's parents were members of the Theosophical Society community of Lomaland in San Diego County.

When Mann was three, his parents moved to Austria to seek treatment for his father's ill health, leaving Mann behind in Lomaland. Mann's mother did not return for him until he was fourteen, and only then at the urging of a cousin who had paid him a visit and was worried about his treatment and situation at Lomaland. In 1917, Mann's family relocated to New York where he developed a penchant for acting. This was reinforced with Mann's participation in the Young Men's Hebrew Association. He continued to act in school productions, studying at East Orange Grammar and Newark's Central High School. At the latter school, he portrayed the title role in Alcestis; one of his friends and classmates was future Hollywood studio executive Dore Schary. After his father's death in 1923, Mann dropped out during his senior year to help with the family's finances. (Note: Alvarez writes, "In New Jersey, Emile Anton attended elementary school in East Orange and high school in Newark but dropped out to go to work." However, Mann's obituary in The New York Times reports him leaving high school at age sixteen, but the Central High School transcripts indicate a January 1925 dropout date, when Emile Anton was eighteen.)

== Career ==
=== 1925–1937: Theater career ===
Back in New York, Mann took a job as a night watchman for Westinghouse Electric, which enabled him to look for stage work during the day. Within a few months, Mann was working full-time at the Triangle Theater in Greenwich Village. Using the name "Anton Bundsmann", he appeared as an actor in The Dybbuk (1925) with an English translation by Henry Alsberg, The Little Clay Cart (1926), and The Squall (1926) by Jean Bart. Towards the end of the decade, Mann appeared in the Broadway productions of The Blue Peter and Uncle Vanya (1929).

In 1930, Mann joined the Theatre Guild, as a production manager and eventually as a director. Nevertheless, he continued to act, appearing in The Streets of New York, or Poverty is No Crime (1931), and The Bride the Sun Shines On (1933) portraying the "Duke of Calcavalle". In 1933, Mann directed a stage adaptation of Christopher Morley's Thunder on the Left, which was performed at the Maxine Elliott's Theatre. In a theatre review for The New York Times, Brooks Atkinson dismissed the play, writing "its medley of realism and fantasy grows less intelligible scene by scene, and some of the acting is disenchantingly profane." He later directed Cherokee Night (1936), So Proudly We Hail (1936), and The Big Blow (1938). He worked for various stock companies, and in 1934, he established his own, which later became Long Island's Red Barn Playhouse.

=== 1937–1941: Move to Hollywood and television career ===
In 1937, Mann began working for Selznick International Pictures as a talent scout and casting director. He also directed screen tests for a number of films, including The Adventures of Tom Sawyer (1938), Intermezzo (1939), Gone with the Wind (1939), and Rebecca (1940). One of the unknown actresses he tested was Jennifer Jones. After a few months at Selznick, Mann moved to Paramount Pictures to serve as an assistant director for several film directors, most particularly for Preston Sturges on Sullivan's Travels (1941). Mann recalled, "[Preston] let me go through the entire production, watching him direct – and I directed a little. I'd stage a scene and he'd tell me how lousy it was. Then I watched the editing and I was able gradually to build up knowledge. Preston insisted I make a film as soon as possible." He served three years in the position.

Meanwhile, Mann did notable, but mostly lost, work as a director for NBC's experimental television station W2XBS from 1939 to 1940. This included condensations of the hit Western play The Missouri Legend and the melodrama The Streets of New York. A five-minute silent clip of the latter show survives in the Museum of Television and Radio, including noted actors Norman Lloyd and George Coulouris.

=== 1942–1946: Move to directing ===
Through the efforts of his friend MacDonald Carey, Mann made his directorial debut with Dr. Broadway (1942) at Paramount, which starred Carey. Decades later, Mann remembered he was told to complete shooting the film in eighteen days. Upon its release, Herman Schoenfeld of Variety was dismissive of the film writing, "The dialog could have just as well have been written in baby talk, and Anton Mann's direction just wasn't. The photography is spotty and the production looks inexpensive. Acting is weak, only Edward Ciannelli as the killer who gets killed, turning in an adequate job." Harrison's Reports was more complimentary, stating the film was a "fairly good program entertainment" with "colorful characters, human interest, fast action, and situations that hold one in suspense."

His follow-up film was Moonlight in Havana (1943) at Universal Pictures. The film featured Allan Jones and Jane Frazee. In August 1944, it was reported Mann might return to Broadway to direct Mirror for Children. After nine months without directing a feature film, Mann went to Republic Pictures where he directed Nobody's Darling (1944) and My Best Gal (1944).

He next directed Strangers in the Night (1944). The film tells of Hilda Blake (Helene Thimig) who creates an imaginary "daughter" for Sgt. Johnny Meadows (William Terry) who is injured in the South Pacific. After being discharged and returning to the U.S., Meadows searches for the imaginary woman. He is informed of the truth by Dr. Leslie Ross (Virginia Grey), who is later murdered by Blake; in turn, Blake plans to murder Meadows. The film was notable for its noirish mise-en-scène and psychological depth that appeared in Mann's latter films. Mann then directed The Great Flamarion (1945), starring Erich von Stroheim and Mary Beth Hughes. During principal photography, Mann clashed with von Stroheim, describing him at length as "difficult. He was a personality, not really an actor ... He drove me mad. He was a genius. I'm not a genius: I'm a worker."

Mann moved to RKO to direct Two O'Clock Courage (1945), itself a remake of the 1936 film Two in the Dark, with Tom Conway and Ann Rutherford in the leading roles. That same year, he also directed Sing Your Way Home. Mann returned to Republic Pictures for Strange Impersonation (1946). He directed The Bamboo Blonde (1946) at RKO.

=== 1947–1949: Film noir and career breakthrough ===
By 1946, Mann had signed with Eagle-Lion Films, a fledgling studio founded by Arthur B. Krim and Robert Benjamin. There, he directed Railroaded! (1947). According to Mann, the film was shot in ten days. A film review in Variety noted the film was "an old-type, blood-and-thunder gangster meller that's better than its no-name cast would indicate," and particular praised Mann for directing "with real acumen in developing maximum of suspense."

That same year, T-Men (1947) was released. According to Elmer Lincoln Irey, the film originated from a rejected offer to dramatize the U.S. Treasury's investigation of Al Capone on tax evasion charges. Instead, Irey brought forward three cases related to the investigation. Initially budgeted at $400,000, T-Men was shot within three weeks from July 31 to August 23, with four days of reshoots in September. For the film, Mann specifically requested cinematographer John Alton, who was loaned out from Republic for the job, marking T-Men as their first collaboration. During its release, the film earned $2.5 million worldwide.

He went back to RKO for Desperate (1947), which he also co-wrote with Dorothy Atlas. A review in Variety positively wrote it was "a ripsnorting gangster meller, with enough gunplay, bumping off of characters and grim brutality to smack of pre-code days"; Mann's direction was noted as "being done skillfully".

Mann returned to Eagle-Lion to direct Raw Deal (1948), reteaming with screenwriter John C. Higgins, screenwriter Leopold Atlas and actor Dennis O'Keefe. The film centers on Joe (O'Keefe), who has been wrongly imprisoned and fingered by his old friends. He escapes from prison and goes on the run with two women, a nice social worker, Ann (Marsha Hunt), whom he takes as a hostage, and a femme fatale, Pat (Claire Trevor), who helped release him. Both women are doomed to be in love with him. The film review magazine Harrison's Reports wrote: "Fast-paced and packed with action, this gangster-type melodrama should go over pretty well with adult audiences, in spite of the fact that the plot is not always logical"; it also noted "Anthony Mann's taut direction has squeezed every bit of excitement and suspense out of the material at hand." Variety noted: "Though a medium budgeter, [Raw Deal] is dressed tidily with a good production and some marquee weight furnished by" the cast. Bosley Crowther of The New York Times gave the film a negative review, writing it is "a movie—and a pretty low-grade one, at that—in which sensations of fright and excitement are more diligently pursued than common sense."

Mann's success with Desperate and T-Men made him Eagle-Lion's most valuable director. In February 1948, Mann was hired to direct a dramatization of the storming of the Bastille, with Richard Basehart to portray an aide to General Lafayette. With Walter Wanger preoccupied with Joan of Arc (1948), he handed off supervisory duties to production designer William Cameron Menzies. Principal photography lasted 29 days, from August to September 1948, and cost $850,000. Reteaming with Alton, he and Mann developed a low-cost noir style, using low lighting levels and omnipresent shadows on minimal decor, high-angled camera shots, and rear projection for wide crowd shots. The resulting film was titled Reign of Terror (1949). After filming had begun, Mann was brought in to direct several scenes for He Walked by Night (1948), which also starred Basehart. Mann again collaborated with Higgins and Alton on the film. However, Alfred L. Werker was given the official director's credit.

While researching on T-Men (1947), Higgins and Mann had come across the topic of Border Patrol agents along the Mexico–United States border. Border Incident (1949) was initially developed at Eagle-Lion, but in December 1948, MGM's Dore Schary purchased the script for $50,000 and hired Mann to direct the film. Schary had also signed Mann onto a multi-picture contract with MGM.

Beforehand, in July 1947, Mann and Francis Rosenwald had written a script for Follow Me Quietly (1949). It was first purchased by Jack Wrather Productions for Allied Artists, with Don Castle in the lead role. According to Eddie Muller, of Turner Classic Movies, Mann was slated to direct the film, but was enticed by Edward Small to instead direct T-Men and Raw Deal. Months later, in December, RKO had purchased the script from Wrather and assigned Martin Rackin write a new script. Due to Mann's absence, Richard Fleischer was hired to direct Follow Me Quietly, and there has been speculation suggesting Mann did uncredited filming. However, Muller has disagreed.

Mann and Rosenwald wrote another script titled Stakeout, which told of a police detective attempting to expose a corrupt political machine. In October 1949, independent film producer Louis Mandel purchased the script, with Larry Parks cast in the lead role. Joseph H. Lewis was set to direct the film until he left due to a contractual dispute. By March 1950, Parks's wife Betty Garrett was cast in the femme fatale role, but the project never went into production.

=== 1950–1958: Western films and collaborations with James Stewart ===
The 1950s marked a notable turn in Mann's career, in which he directed a total of ten Western films throughout the decade (three of which were released in 1950). After Border Incident (1949), Mann was approached by Nicholas Nayfack, who asked him: "How would you like to direct a Western? I've a scenario here that seems interesting." He was handed the script for Devil's Doorway (1950), deeming it "the best script I had ever read." The film starred Robert Taylor, portraying a Shoshone native who faces prejudice after returning home in Medicine Bow, Wyoming following his decorated service in the American Civil War. Principal photography began on August 15, 1949, and lasted until mid-October. MGM initially withheld the film because of its topical subject, but released the film after Delmer Daves' Broken Arrow (1950), which starred James Stewart, had become successful. When it was released, the film was neither a critical or commercial success.

He followed this with a Western at Universal, starring James Stewart, Winchester '73 (1950). The film was originally set to be directed by Fritz Lang, but he felt Stewart was unsuitable for the lead role and dropped out. When Stewart had seen a rough cut of Devil's Doorway (1950), he suggested Mann as a replacement. Mann readily accepted, but threw out the script calling Borden Chase for a rewrite. Principal photography began on February 14, 1950, in Tucson, Arizona for a thirty-day shooting schedule. The film was a commercial success, earning $2.25 million in distributor rentals becoming Universal Pictures' second-most successful film of 1950.

At the invitation of Hal Wallis, Mann directed the Western The Furies (1950) at Paramount starring Barbara Stanwyck and Walter Huston. Also released in summer 1950, the film grossed $1.55 million in distributor rentals in the United States and Canada. Mann reflected, "It had marvellous characters, interesting notices, but it failed because nobody in it cared about anything—they were all rudderless, rootless, and haters." In the fall of 1950, Mann was sent to Cinecittà to do second-unit work on Quo Vadis (1951). There, Mann worked 24 nights, filming the burning of Rome sequence with assistant cinematographer William V. Skall.

Side Street (1950) was the final film noir that Mann directed. The film starred Farley Granger and Cathy O'Donnell, reteaming after They Live by Night (1948). He next directed a period thriller with Dick Powell, The Tall Target (1952).

After the success of Winchester '73 (1950), Universal Pictures wanted another collaboration between Mann and Stewart. After a recommendation from one friend, Stewart proposed adapting the novel Bend of the River by Bill Gulick to Universal. The studio agreed and purchased the film rights. The actor and director made a contemporary adventure film, Thunder Bay (1953) at Universal. Feeling dissatisfied with the final film, Mann stated, "We tried but it was all too fabricated and the story was weak. We were never able to lick it ...It didn't get terribly good notices but of course it made a profit."

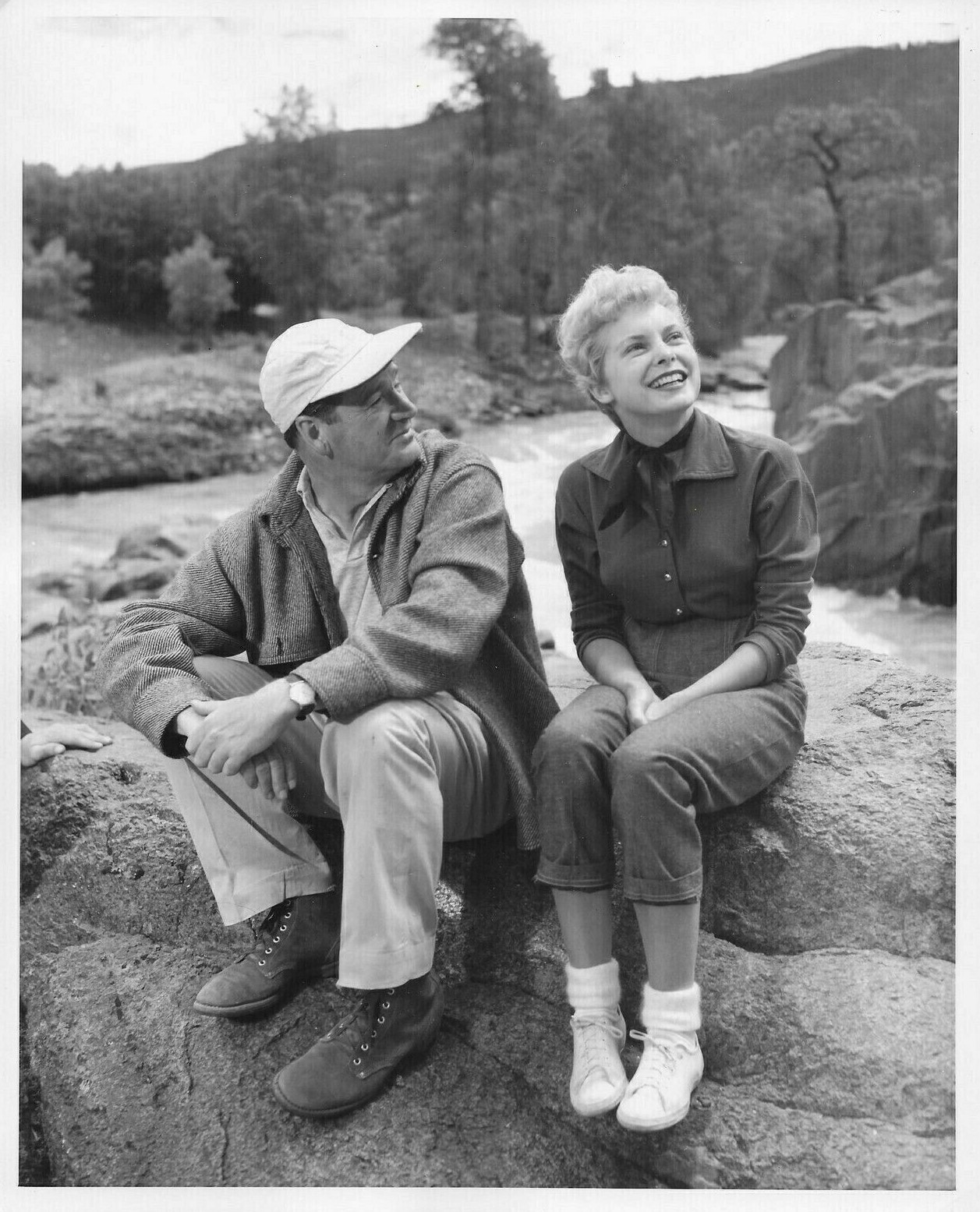
Anthony Mann and Janet Leigh

In 1952, MGM approached Mann to direct The Naked Spur (1953). The story told of bounty hunter Howard Kemp who wants to collect a $5,000 reward on an outlaw's head so he can buy back land lost to him during the American Civil War. With unwanted help from a gold prospector and an Army deserter, Kemp captures the outlaw and the girlfriend who accompanies him. With the film's release in 1953, Mann fulfilled his contract with MGM.

Mann and Stewart had their biggest success with The Glenn Miller Story (1954). During its release, the film earned $7 million in distributor rentals in the United States and Canada. That same year, he filmed The Far Country with James Stewart and Walter Brennan. The film would be Mann's last collaboration with Borden Chase.

Mann and Stewart paired for one more non-Western film, Strategic Air Command (1955). Stewart had served with the U.S. Air Force and pushed for a cinematic portrayal. With the cooperation of the Air Force, Mann agreed to direct the film, wanting to film the Convair B-36 and Boeing B-47 in action as the human characters, in his words, "were papier-mâché". During its release, the film earned $6.5 million at the box office.

Mann's last collaboration with Stewart was The Man from Laramie (1955) at Columbia Pictures. The film was an adaptation from a serial by Thomas T. Flynn, first published in The Saturday Evening Post in 1954. The film was shot on location in Coronado, New Mexico, and in Sante Fe. The film was the favorite of Stewart's of the films they made together. After the film's release, Harry Cohn asked Mann to direct another Western film for Columbia. Mann agreed and decided to direct The Last Frontier (1955). Mann offered Stewart the lead role to which he declined and instead cast Victor Mature.

In 1956, Mann was handed the script for Night Passage (1957) by Aaron Rosenberg, intending to reunite him with Stewart for a potential ninth collaboration. Before filming was set to begin on September 4, Mann withdrew from the project. Contemporary accounts reported that Mann withdrew because he had not yet finished editing Men in War (1957). However, latter accounts state Mann had developed creative differences with Chase over the script, which Mann considered to be weak. In 1967, Mann had also accused Stewart of only doing the film so he could play his accordion. Mann asked to be replaced, and James Neilson was hired to direct the film. Stewart and Mann never collaborated on another project again.

Mann directed a musical starring Mario Lanza titled Serenade (1956). During filming, he worked with actress Sara Montiel, who became his second wife. In August 1957, Mann announced he had acquired the film rights to Lion Feuchtwanger's novel This is the Hour, which told a fictionalized account of painter Francisco Goya. Montiel was set to portray Maria Teresa de Cayetana, Duchess of Alba. By February 1958, Mann had abandoned the project as a rival film titled The Naked Maja (1958) was in production. He then purchased the film rights to John McPartland's then-recently published novel Ripe Fruit, with Montiel set to star. However, the project failed to materialize.

Mann directed a Western starring Henry Fonda and Anthony Perkins titled The Tin Star (1957). Mann then teamed with Philip Yordan on two films starring Robert Ryan and Aldo Ray; the first being Men in War (1957) was about the Korean War. The film was the first of three Mann had directed for United Artists. His second project was a 1958 film adaptation of Erskine Caldwell's then-controversial novel God's Little Acre. Mann and producer Sidney Harmon had intended to film in Augusta, Georgia, but the novel's controversial subject matter heightened resistance from city leaders and local farmers. As a result, the production was denied permission to film in the state. In October 1957, they eventually selected Stockton, California. On both films, Yordan was given the official screenwriter credit, but Ben Maddow stated he had written both screenplays.

Mann later directed Gary Cooper in a Western, Man of the West (1958) for United Artists. Filming began on February 10, 1958, and ended later that same year. When it was released, Howard Thompson of The New York Times wrote the film was "good, lean, tough little Western" that was "[w]ell-acted and beautifully photographed in color and Cinema-Scope". Elsewhere, Jean-Luc Godard, then a critic for Cahiers du Cinéma, gave the film a raving review when it was released in France.

=== 1959–1964: Widescreen films ===
Mann was hired by Universal Pictures to direct Spartacus (1960), much to the disagreement of Kirk Douglas who felt Mann "seemed scared of the scope of the picture". Filming started on January 27, 1959, in Death Valley, California, for the mine sequence. As filming continued, Douglas felt Mann had lost control of the film, writing in particular: "He let Peter Ustinov direct his own scenes by taking every suggestion Peter made. The suggestions were good—for Peter, but not necessarily for the film." With the studio's approval, Douglas was permitted to fire Mann. According to Douglas's account, Mann graciously exited the production on February 13, to which Douglas promised he "owe[d]" a film to him. In 1967, Mann stated: "Kirk Douglas was the producer of Spartacus: he wanted to insist on the message angle. I thought the message would go over more easily by showing physically all the horrors of slavery. A film must be visual, too much dialogue kills it ... From then, we disagreed: I left." On February 17, 1959, Stanley Kubrick was hired to direct.

Shortly after, Mann went to MGM to direct Glenn Ford in a remake of Cimarron (1960). During production, Mann had filmed on location for twelve days, but the shoot had experienced troublesome storms. In response, studio executives at MGM decided to relocate the production indoors. Mann disagreed, remarking the production had become "an economic disaster and a fiasco and the whole project was destroyed." Mann left the production, and was replaced by Charles Walters.

In July 1960, Mann was hired to direct El Cid (1961) for Samuel Bronston. The film starred Charlton Heston and Sophia Loren. In November 1960, before filming was to begin, Loren was displeased with her dialogue in the script, and requested for blacklisted screenwriter Ben Barzman to rewrite it. On an airplane trip to Rome, Mann retrieved Barzman and handed him the latest shooting script, to which Barzman agreed to rewrite from scratch. Filming began on November 14, 1960, and lasted until April 1961. Released in December 1961, El Cid was released to critical acclaim, with praise towards Mann's direction, the cast and the cinematography. At the box office, the film earned $12 million in distributor rentals from the United States and Canada.

Mann next directed The Fall of the Roman Empire (1964). The project's genesis began when Mann, who had recently finished filming El Cid (1961), had spotted an Oxford concise edition of Edward Gibbon's six-volume series The History of the Decline and Fall of the Roman Empire near the front window at the Hatchards bookshop. Mann then read the book, and after a flight trip to Madrid, he pitched a film adaptation of the book to Bronston, to which the producer agreed. The film was intended to reunite Heston and Loren, but Heston departed the project to star in 55 Days at Peking (1963), another Bronston production. His role was subsequently assumed by Stephen Boyd. Filming began on January 14, 1963, and wrapped in July 1963. Released in March 1964, the film earned $1.9 million in box office rentals in the United States and Canada, against an estimated production budget of $16 million. That same year, in July, Mann served as the head of the jury at the 14th Berlin International Film Festival.

=== 1965–1967: Later films ===
In March 1963, Mann and producer S. Benjamin Fisz had reportedly begun development on The Unknown Battle, a historic re-telling of Norwegian resistance soldier Knut Haukelid's sabotage mission to prevent Nazi Germany from developing an atomic bomb during World War II. Barzman had been hired to write the script, with Allied Artists as a distributor. By February 1964, Boyd and Elke Sommer had been hired to portray the leading roles. However, in July, Kirk Douglas was hired to portray the lead role. In his memoir, Douglas accepted the role after receiving an unexpected phone call from Mann, fulfilling his earlier promise that he "owed" him a film. The film was then re-titled The Heroes of Telemark (1965).

In October 1966, Mann was announced to direct and produce the spy thriller A Dandy in Aspic (1968) for Columbia Pictures. By December, filming was set to begin in February 1967 where it would film on location in Austria, Germany, and London. At the time of his death, Mann was developing three projects: a Western film titled The King, which was loosely adapted from King Lear, with sons replacing the daughters; The Donner Pass, a film about pioneers trekking to the Donner Pass; and The Canyon, a film about a young Native American becoming a Brave.

== Personal life ==
In 1936, Mann married Mildred Kenyon, who worked as a clerk at a Macy's department store in New York City. The marriage produced two children, Anthony and Nina. The couple divorced in 1956. A year later, Mann married Spanish actress Sara Montiel, who had starred in Serenade (1956). In 1963, the marriage was annulled in Madrid. His third marriage was to Anna Kutzko, a ballerina formerly with Sadler's Wells, who had one son named Nicholas (1965-2015).

On April 29, 1967, Mann died from a heart attack in his hotel room in Berlin. He had spent the two weeks prior to his death filming A Dandy in Aspic. The film was completed by the film's star Laurence Harvey. For his contribution to the motion picture industry, he has a star on the Hollywood Walk of Fame at 6229 Hollywood Boulevard.

== Filmmaking style ==
=== Portrayal of antiheroes ===
The Mann western hero has learned wariness the hard way, because he usually has something to hide. He is a man with a past: some psychic shadow or criminal activity that has left him gnarled and calcified. Not so long ago he was a raider, a rustler, maybe a killer. If a movie were made of some previous chapter in his life, he'd be the villain, and he might be gunned down before he had the chance at redemption that Mann's films offer.

— Richard Corliss

Mann's filmography has been observed for his depiction of antiheroes. (Note: Attributed to multiple references:) In 2006, Richard Corliss observed that Mann's antiheroes typically have a troubled past, leaving them jaded or cynical at the start of the film, and are presented with a path to redemption. Jean-Pierre Coursodon and Pierre Sauvage noted the troubled past in Mann's several films have included "the death of a loved one (a father in Winchester '73 and The Furies, a brother in The Man from Laramie, a wife in The Tin Star), and the hero is out to punish the responsible party or, as in the case of The Tin Star, resents society as a whole for what happened."

By the 1950s, Mann had shifted to directing Western films, with Winchester '73 (1950) as his first collaboration with James Stewart. Aaron Rosenberg, who had produced the film, observed: "He [Mann] also brought out something in James Stewart that hadn't been really been seen before. It was an almost manic rage that would suddenly explode ... And then Stewart's character would just go into a violent rage which was a fresh approach, not just for Stewart but also for the Western. Here was a hero with flaws." In The Naked Spur (1953), Howard Kemp (Stewart) is a bounty hunter intent on bringing a fugitive back to Kansas. When faced with the choice to kill the fugitive, Kemp reins in his murderous impulse. Corliss observed: "It happens over and over in these movies: the hero's recognition that his old self is his own worst enemy."

Mann and Stewart had a falling out during pre-production of Night Passage (1957), in which Gary Cooper assumed the lead role in Man of the West (1958). Mann biographer Jeanine Basinger writes Cooper's character is a "man with a guilty secret. He was once an evil outlaw, a member of the notorious Dock Tobin gang. He was responsible for robberies, raids, and the murders of innocent victims." In the film, Link Jones (Cooper) is confronted by his outlaw uncle Dock Tobin (Lee J. Cobb), a figure of his past. In the narrative, Link realizes he must kill all the gang members not only to save himself but also to restore the world which he has made for himself.

=== Use of landscapes ===
Mann's portrayal of the American landscape in his Westerns have been observed by film academics. (Note: Attributed to multiple references:) In a 1965 interview, Mann expressed his preference for location filming, stating: "Well, the use of the location is to enhance the characters who are involved in it, because somebody who is really minor in feelings and minor as an actor can become tremendous once he's set against a tremendously pictorial background. The great value of using locations is that it enhances everything: it enhances the story; it enhances the very action and the acting. I'll never show a piece of scenery, a gorge, a chasm, without an actor in it."

Coursodon and Sauvage noted Mann incorporates landscapes as part of the narrative, writing "His camera is never too close to isolate, never too far to dwarf. He is not interested in beauty per se, neither does he care much for symbolism. He had an unfailing flair for selecting exteriors that were not only adapted to the requirements of the script but came across as the embodiment of the psychological and moral tensions in it." During filming for Cimarron (1960), Mann's preference for location shooting ran into conflict with MGM producer Sol Lesser, who relocated the production indoors, which forced Mann's departure from the film.

== Filmography ==
Year	Title	Genre	Studio
1942	Dr. Broadway	Mystery comedy	Paramount Pictures
1942	Moonlight in Havana	Romantic comedy	Universal Pictures
1943	Nobody's Darling	Musical	Republic Pictures
1944	My Best Gal	Comedy	Republic Pictures
1945	Strangers in the Night	Film noir	Republic Pictures
1945	The Great Flamarion	Film noir	Republic Pictures
1945	Sing Your Way Home	Musical film	RKO Radio Pictures
1945	Two O'Clock Courage	Film noir	RKO Radio Pictures
1946	Strange Impersonation	Film noir	Republic Pictures
1946	The Bamboo Blonde	Romantic comedy	RKO Radio Pictures
1947	T-Men	Film noir	Eagle-Lion Films
1947	Railroaded!	Film noir	Eagle-Lion Films
1947	Desperate	Film noir	RKO Radio Pictures
1948	Raw Deal	Film noir	Eagle-Lion Films
1949	Reign of Terror	Historical thriller	Eagle-Lion Films
1949	Border Incident	Film noir	Metro-Goldwyn-Mayer
1949	Side Street	Film noir	Metro-Goldwyn-Mayer
1950	The Furies	Western	Paramount Pictures
1950	Winchester '73	Western	Universal Pictures
1950	Devil's Doorway	Western	Metro-Goldwyn-Mayer
1951	The Tall Target	Western	Metro-Goldwyn-Mayer
1952	Bend of the River	Western	Universal-International
1953	The Naked Spur	Western	Metro-Goldwyn-Mayer
1953	Thunder Bay	Adventure	Universal-International
1954	The Glenn Miller Story	Biographical drama	Universal-International
1954	The Far Country	Western	Universal Pictures
1955	Strategic Air Command	War drama	Paramount Pictures
1955	The Man from Laramie	Western	Columbia Pictures
1955	The Last Frontier	Western	Columbia Pictures
1956	Serenade	Musical	Warner Bros.
1957	The Tin Star	Western	Paramount Pictures
1957	Men in War	War	Security Pictures/United Artists
1958	God's Little Acre	Drama	Security Pictures/United Artists
1958	Man of the West	Western	United Artists
1960	Cimarron	Western	Metro-Goldwyn-Mayer
1961	El Cid	Historical epic	Samuel Bronston Productions/Allied Artists
1964	The Fall of the Roman Empire	Historical epic	Samuel Bronston Productions/Paramount Pictures
1965	The Heroes of Telemark	War	The Rank Organisation
1968	A Dandy in Aspic	Spy thriller	Columbia Pictures

== Sources ==
=== Works cited ===
Biographies (chronological)

- Bassinger, Jeanine (2007) [1979]. Anthony Mann: New and Expanded Edition. Wesleyan University Press. ISBN 978-0-819-56845-8.
- Wakeman, John (1987). "Anthony Mann". World Film Directors: Volume 1—1890–1945. H. W. Wilson. pp. 723–731. ISBN 978-0-824-20757-1.
- Darby, William (2009). Anthony Mann: The Film Career. McFarland & Company. ISBN 978-0-786-43839-6.

Miscellaneous

- Alton, John (2013) [1995]. Painting with Light. University of California Press. ISBN 978-0-520-27584-3.
- Alvarez, Max (2013). The Crime Films of Anthony Mann. University Press of Mississippi. ISBN 978-1-617-03924-9.
- Barzman, Norma (2003). The Red and the Blacklist: The Intimate Memoir of a Hollywood Expatriate. Nation Books. ISBN 978-1-560-25617-5.
- Bernstein, Matthew (2000) [1994]. Walter Wanger, Hollywood Independent. University of Minnesota Press. ISBN 0-8166-3548-X.
- Coursodon, Jean-Pierre; Sauvage, Pierre (1983). "Anthony Mann". American Directors, Volume 1. New York: McGraw-Hill. pp. 237–243. ISBN 0-07-013263-1.
- Douglas, Kirk (1989). The Ragman's Son: An Autobiography. New York: Pocket Books. ISBN 0-671-63718-5.
- Eliot, Mark (2006). Jimmy Stewart: A Biography. New York: Random House. ISBN 978-1-400-05222-6.
- Fenwick, J. H; Armytage, Jonathan-Green (Fall 1965). "Now You See It: Landscape and Anthony Mann". Sight and Sound. 34 (4): 186–189.
- Horton, Robert (March 1990). "Mann & Stewart: Two Rode Together". Film Comment. 26 (2): 40. ProQuest 210251212.
- Kitses, Jim (2004). "Anthony Mann: The Overreacher". Horizons West: Directing the Western from John Ford to Clint Eastwood. London: British Film Institute. pp. 139–172.
- Missiaen, Jean-Claude (December 1967). "A Lesson in Cinema: Interview with Anthony Mann" (PDF). Cahiers du Cinéma in English (Interview). No. 12. pp. 44–51 – via Monoskop.
- Munn, Michael (2006). Jimmy Stewart: The Truth Behind the Legend. London: Robson Books. ISBN 978-1-861-05961-1.
- Pickard, Roy (1992). Jimmy Stewart: A Life in Film. New York: St. Martin's Press. ISBN 0312088280.
- Sadoul, Georges; Morris, Peter (1972). Peter Morris (ed.). Dictionary of film makers. University of California Press. ISBN 978-0-520-02151-8.
- Sarris, Andrew (1968). The American Cinema: Directors and Directions: 1929–1968. New York: Dutton. ISBN 978-0-525-47227-8.
- Spoto, Donald (1990). Madcap: The Life of Preston Sturges. Little, Brown and Company. ISBN 0-316-80726-5.
- Wicking, Christopher; Pattison, Barrie (July 1969). "Interviews with Anthony Mann". Screen. 10 (4–5): 32–54. doi:10.1093/screen/10.4-5.32.
- Wood, Robin (June 1998). "Man(n) of the West(ern)". CineAction. No. 46. pp. 26–33.
