= Rosice (disambiguation) =

Rosice is a town in the South Moravian Region of the Czech Republic.

Rosice may also refer to places in the Czech Republic:

- Rosice (Chrudim District), a municipality and village in the Pardubice Region
- Cerekvička-Rosice, a municipality in the Vysočina Region
- Rosice, an administrative part of Pardubice
