= Carissa Phelps =

American author, attorney, and advocate

- Born: September 12, 1976 (age 49); Fresno, California
- Education: Bachelor's degree (Mathematics); Master of Business Administration; Juris Doctor
- Alma mater: Cuesta College; University of California, Berkeley; California State University, Fresno; UCLA School of Law; UCLA Anderson School of Management
- Occupations: Nonprofit executive, attorney.
- Organization(s): Runaway Girl, Inc.
- Agent: Stuart Krichevsky
- Known for: Author, attorney, community activist, founder of Runaway Girl, Inc.
- Notable work: Runaway Girl: Escaping Life on the Streets, One Helping Hand at a Time
- Parent(s): Richard Phelps; Sharol Macleod
- Website: carissaphelps.com

Carissa Liana Phelps (born September 12, 1976) is an American author, attorney, and advocate for sexually exploited runaway children and homeless youth. She is known as the subject of the award-winning documentary, Carissa, directed by David Sauvage and produced by Davis Guggenheim, Chad Troutwine, and Jamie McCourt. The 2008 film revisits her life as a sexually exploited runaway child living on the streets of Fresno, California. Having been involved in various petty crimes and probation violations, as well as grand theft auto, she was incarcerated at the CK Wakefield Home for Boys during a pilot program to voluntarily integrate girls into the facility by the California Youth Authority. Teaching herself mathematics and working to overcome numerous rapes, sexual exploitation, and substance abuse and addictions, she eventually graduated with an MBA and a J.D. degree from UCLA. She is the founder of Runaway Girl, Inc., which advocates for runaway and homeless youth, while providing training for organizations to effectively reach out and address homelessness and human trafficking. In 2012, her life story was told in the book, Runaway Girl: Escaping Life on the Streets, One Helping Hand at a Time.

== Early life ==
Carissa Phelps was born in Fresno, California on September 12, 1976. She is the daughter of Richard Phelps and Sharol Macleod. Phelps has five brothers and sisters, including her older sisters Emily, Sophie, and Sky, her older brother Richie, and her younger brother Jacob. Phelps' mother was a Jehovah's Witnesses church member and raised her children with those beliefs. While her husband, Richard, did not consider himself a member, she attended services and events together with her children on a regular basis. As members of the Jehovah's Witnesses church, the Phelps family did not celebrate holidays, including birthdays, Christmas, and Easter.

Phelps' parents were divorced when she was five years old. Soon after the divorce, her mother left Coalinga with her six children and moved to southern California, where she married a man named Steve Macleod. When the families were moved into one home, there were a total of ten children, which expanded to 11, after the birth of Phelps' new brother, Ethan. While the Phelps family were members of the Jehovah's Witness church, the Macleod family were members of the Church of Jesus Christ of Latter-day Saints (LDS Church). After her mother remarried, the blended family began celebrating birthdays, Christmas, and Easter together, as was customary in the life of Phelps' new stepfather and step-siblings. After five years in southern California, the family moved back to Coalinga, located an hour south of Fresno.

With a family of 13, including 11 children in the home, life became a cycle of abuse, neglect, and abandonment. When Phelps' sister, Emily, was 15 years old, she successfully petitioned the courts for emancipation. When Phelps was in fifth grade, she won a scholastic math award. She was honored with an awards ceremony at her school, during which she was presented with a signed letter by US President Ronald Reagan, in which he acknowledged her accomplishments. When her mother's response was less than enthusiastic, Phelps acted out in various ways, including fighting, shoplifting, and staying out past curfew. Oftentimes, she would disappear for hours at night riding her bike, just to keep out of the drama that enveloped the family's home.

When Phelps was 11 years old, her sister, Sky, warned her that their stepfather had been making sexual advances toward her and offered money in exchange for her virginity. Sky suggested that Phelps move with her younger brother, Jacob, to Redding, California, to live with their father and older brother, Richie. After a conversation with their father and a confrontation between the daughters and their mother, it was agreed that Phelps and her younger brother would move to Redding. After arriving, the children were enrolled in tae kwon do classes and gymnastics. While their father had plans to remarry and looked forward to starting a new family, his girlfriend turned down his proposal, which caused him to spiral into drinking and depression. After the children discovered their father's pornographic video collection, they realized that life at their father's house wasn't the safe haven that Sky thought it would be. A couple of weeks later, the children returned to their mother's home in Coalinga. By this time, five of her siblings had left home, leaving in addition to herself, her brothers Jacob and Ethan, and step-siblings Sara, Tanner, and Travis.

Soon after returning to Coalinga, Phelps started junior high school, but found it difficult to acclimate to the new school and students. When other girls were wearing the latest fashion trends and makeup, Phelps was initially unable to afford such things. She was also self-conscious due to dental work that she needed, but couldn't afford. She soon became defiant of authority and began acting out by skipping classes and cursing at her teachers. The summer following eighth grade, Phelps began wearing makeup and dressing in the style that was popular for young girls of Mexican descent. The style, known as chola, included wearing thick black eyeliner, bright red lipstick, large hooped earrings, and lots of hairspray. As she adopted the current trends and styles, Phelps began attracting the attention of boys in her school.

== Professional background ==
- Passed the California State Bar in July 2008.

== Carissa documentary ==
In fall 2007, while she was attending UCLA's Anderson School of Management, Phelps met fellow student and aspiring filmmaker, David Sauvage, son of documentary filmmaker, Pierre Sauvage. They soon began collaborating on a documentary about Phelps' life on the streets of Fresno. Phelps' story caught the attention of Davis Guggenheim, the Academy Award-winning director of An Inconvenient Truth; and Jamie McCourt, former owner and president of the Los Angeles Dodgers, both of whom served as executive producers of Carissa. The documentary was filmed in 2008 and distributed in film festivals around the US. The documentary won jury prizes at several film festivals and was featured in USA Today and on Good Morning America.

== Published works ==
- Phelps, Carissa; and Larkin Warren (2012). Runaway Girl: Escaping Life on the Streets, One Helping Hand at a Time, Viking Adult/Penguin Group Publishing, 320 pages. ISBN 978-0670023721
