= List of Harvard-Westlake School alumni =

This list of alumni of Harvard-Westlake School includes graduates and students who did not graduate.

- Jonathan Ahdout, actor
- Elisa Albert, author
- Dorothy Arzner, film director
- Jillian Banks, musician
- Candice Bergen, actress
- Peter Bergman, actor
- Steve Bing, film producer, philanthropist
- Brennan Boesch, baseball player
- Autumn Burke, California State Assemblymember
- Jessica Capshaw, actress
- Mindy Cohn, actress
- Jarron Collins, basketball player
- Jason Collins, basketball player
- Lily Collins, actress and model
- Pete Crow-Armstrong, baseball player
- Jamie Lee Curtis, actress
- Gray Davis, Governor of California
- Emily Deschanel, actress and model
- Ned Doheny, musician
- Dominique Dunne, actress
- Breck Eisner, TV and film director
- Tony Fagenson, songwriter, drummer
- Douglas Fairbanks Jr., actor
- Beanie Feldstein, actress
- Ayda Field, actress
- Stephen Fishbach, contestant on Survivor: Tocantins and Survivor: Cambodia
- Jack Flaherty, baseball player
- Bridget Fonda, actress
- Max Fried, baseball player
- Eric Garcetti, Los Angeles Mayor (2013–2022)
- Scott Garson, basketball coach
- Jean Paul Getty, businessman
- Lucas Giolito, baseball player
- Ashley Grossman, water polo player
- Jake Gyllenhaal, actor
- Maggie Gyllenhaal, actress
- Julia Hahn, reporter, special assistant to President Trump
- H. R. Haldeman, White House Chief of Staff
- Mark Harmon, actor
- Evan Harris, British Member of Parliament
- Frank C. Hoyt, physicist
- Peter Hudnut, water polo player
- Kiki Iriafen, WNBA player, selected 4th overall in the 2025 WNBA draft to the Washington Mystics
- Alex Israel, multimedia artist and writer
- Jon Jaques, basketball player
- Johnny Juzang, basketball player
- Twila Kilgore (née Kaufman), soccer coach
- Juliette Kayyem, author, TV analyst
- Fran Kranz, actor
- David Ladd, producer and actor
- Phil LaMarr, actor and comedian
- Pepi Lederer, actress and writer
- Greta Lee, actress
- Jake Levine, lawyer and politician
- June Lockhart, actress
- Billie Lourd, actress and daughter of Carrie Fisher
- Jon Lovitz, actor
- Myrna Loy, actress
- Sanam Mahloudji, author
- Danica McKellar, actress, author
- Alex Marlow, Breitbart News editor-in-chief
- Jonathan Martin, football player
- Nick Melvoin, member of the LAUSD Board of Education
- Harold Blaine Miller, U.S. Navy official, Eisenhower appointee, pilot, public relations executive, college administrator, and author
- Elizabeth Montgomery, actress
- Sara Moonves, magazine editor
- Dr. Sheila Nazarian, plastic surgeon and television personality
- Tracy Nelson, actress
- Masi Oka, actor
- Ethan Peck, actor, grandson of actor Gregory Peck
- Elvis Perkins, singer, son of actor Anthony Perkins
- Trent Perry, basketball player
- Ben Platt, actor
- Jonah Platt, actor
- Spencer Rascoff, co-founder of Zillow, Hotwire, Pacaso, Recon Food; former CEO of Zillow
- Jeff Rake, television producer, screenwriter
- Jason Reitman, Golden Globe-winning screenwriter, director
- Sally Ride, astronaut
- Ali Riley, soccer player
- Carl Rinsch, film director currently incarcerated for various crimes
- Josh Satin, retired major league baseball player
- Andrea Savage, actress
- David Sauvage, filmmaker, empath
- Jason Segel, actor, screenwriter
- Ben Sherwood, president of ABC News
- Brad Silberling, film director
- Sabrina Singh — former Deputy Pentagon Press Secretary
- Jacob Soboroff, journalist
- Tori Spelling, actress
- Alex Stepheson, basketball player
- Erik Swoope, football player
- David Talbot, author, media entrepreneur
- Stephen Talbot, actor; documentary filmmaker, PBS Frontline
- Bryce Taylor, basketball player
- Shirley Temple, actress, diplomat
- Kirk Thatcher
- Alyssa Thompson, soccer player
- Gisele Thompson, soccer player
- Dara Torres, swimmer
- Nik Turley, baseball player
- Matthew Weiner, writer
- Eric Weinstein, Podcast host and a former managing director at Thiel Capital.
- Douglas Wick, movie producer
- Austin Wilson, baseball player
- Natalie Winters, White House correspondent
- Jessica Yellin, journalist
- Dean Zanuck, motion picture executive and producer
