= Bend of the River =

1952 film

- Theatrical release poster
- Directed by: Anthony Mann
- Screenplay by: Borden Chase
- Based on: Bend of the Snake; 1950 novel by Bill Gulick
- Produced by: Aaron Rosenberg; Frank Cleaver
- Starring: James Stewart; Arthur Kennedy; Julia Adams; Rock Hudson; Lori Nelson; Jay C. Flippen; Stepin Fetchit
- Cinematography: Irving Glassberg
- Edited by: Russell F. Schoengarth
- Music by: Hans J. Salter
- Color process: Technicolor
- Production company: Universal Pictures
- Distributed by: Universal Pictures
- Release dates: February 29, 1952 (Los Angeles); April 9, 1952 (New York)
- Running time: 91 minutes
- Country: United States
- Language: English
- Box office: $3 million (U.S. rentals)

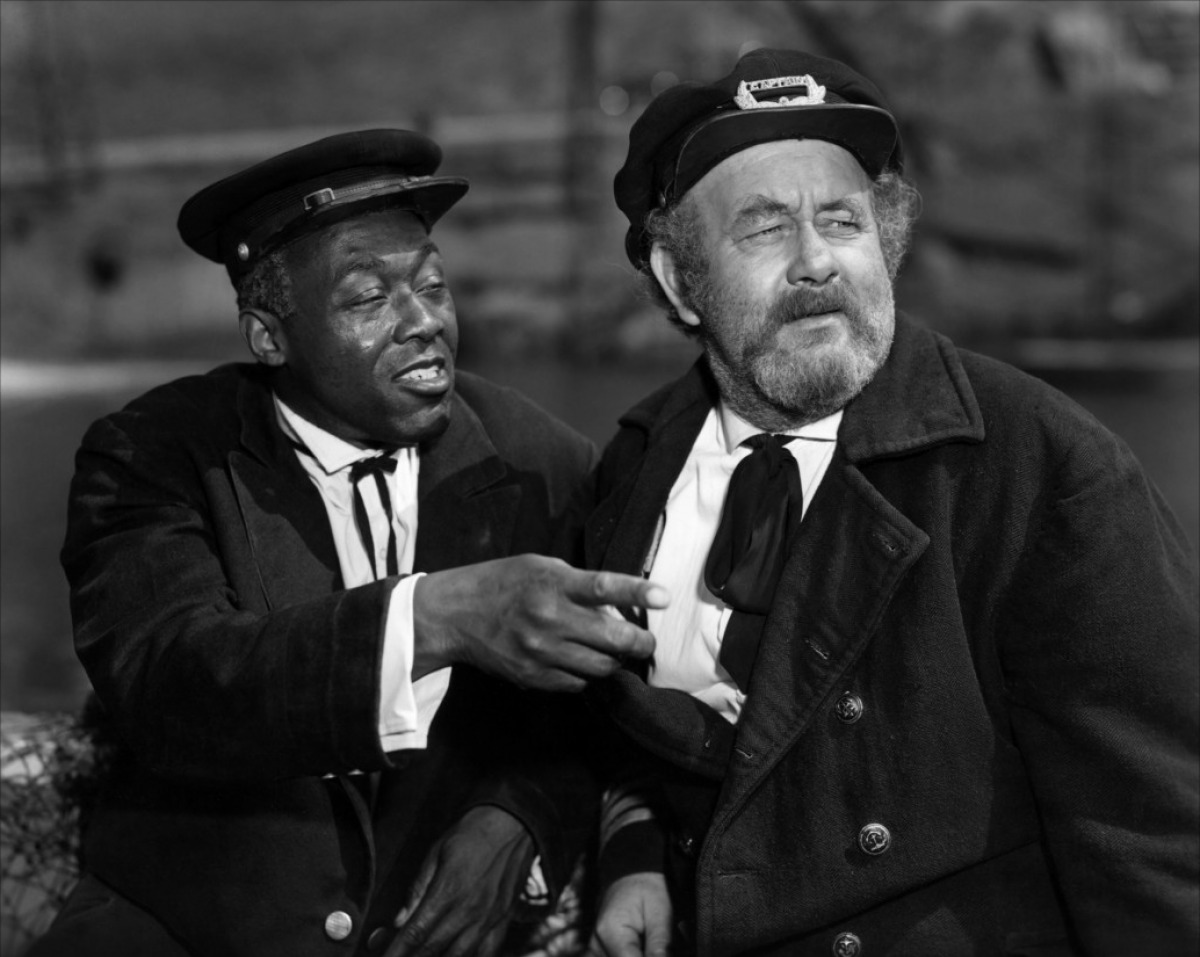
Stepin Fetchit and Chubby Johnson

Bend of the River is a 1952 American Western film directed by Anthony Mann and starring James Stewart, Arthur Kennedy, Julia Adams and Rock Hudson. The screenplay, written by Borden Chase, is based on the 1950 novel Bend of the Snake by Bill Gulick.

Bend of the River was filmed on location in and around the Sandy River, Mount Hood, the Columbia River and Timberline Lodge, Oregon. The film is the second Western collaboration between Mann and Stewart.

== Plot ==
In 1866, remorseful former border raider Glyn McLyntock is guiding a wagon train of settlers to Oregon. While he is checking the trail ahead, he rescues Emerson Cole from being lynched for stealing a horse. Laura Baile, one of the pioneers, fancies McLyntock. That night, they are attacked by five Shoshone Indians and Laura is wounded by an arrow. McLyntock and Cole confront the Shoshones and Cole saves McLyntock's life in the process. McLyntock welcomes Cole, but Jeremy Baile, the leader of the settlers, does not trust him and does not believe that a man can change from bad to good. McLyntock, trying to leave his old life behind, thinks that Baile is wrong.

When they reach Portland, Oregon, Laura remains there to recover. Cole also leaves the party, saying that he wants to travel to California to find gold. The rest establish a settlement in the wilderness after arranging with Tom Hendricks for their winter supplies to be sent later. That night, they host a party and meet professional gambler Trey Wilson.

With winter fast approaching and the supplies at least six weeks late, they begin to worry when the food runs low. McLyntock and Jeremy return to Portland to investigate. They find that a gold rush has enormously inflated prices. Laura and Cole are working for Hendricks and do not intend to reside at the settlement. Jeremy is unhappy about his daughter's relationship with Cole. Hendricks sells the group's supplies for a much higher price to a mining camp. McLyntock secretly hires some men to load the supplies to return to the settlement, but Hendricks discovers their plan, instigating a shootout. Cole and Trey side with McLyntock. When they are pursued, McLyntock springs an ambush that kills Hendricks and some of his gang, and the rest are driven away.

On the way to the settlement, some of the miners appear and offer an exorbitant sum for the supplies. The hired men consider commandeering the wagon train. Cole cannot resist the temptation of the money and double-crosses his friend, but he does not kill him. McLyntock finds them and retakes the supplies with the assistance of Jeremy, Laura and Trey. Cole brings some miners, but they are defeated during a river gunfight. McLyntock fights and kills Cole, whose body is carried away by the current. They reach the settlement with the supplies, and it is apparent that Laura and McLyntock are now together.

== Cast ==
- James Stewart as Glyn McLyntock
- Arthur Kennedy as Emerson Cole
- Julia Adams as Laura Baile
- Rock Hudson as Trey Wilson
- Lori Nelson as Marjie Baile
- Jay C. Flippen as Jeremy Baile
- Howard Petrie as Tom Hendricks
- Chubby Johnson as Captain Mello
- Stepin Fetchit as Adam
- Harry Morgan as Shorty
- Jack Lambert as Red
- Royal Dano as Long Tom
- Frances Bavier as Mrs. Prentiss
- Frank Ferguson as Tom Grundy

== Production ==
The screenplay was written by Borden Chase based on the 1950 novel Bend of the Snake by Bill Gulick.

The film's star James Stewart and director Anthony Mann had worked together on Winchester '73 (1950). Six more films pairing Stewart and Mann followed, including the Westerns The Naked Spur (1953), The Far Country (1954) and The Man from Laramie (1955). Stewart, who drew a percentage of the profits, earned an estimated $750,000 ($7.1 million in 2024 dollars) from the film.

The film was shot on location over the course of five weeks around Mount Hood and along the Columbia River in Oregon. Filming at the 8,000-foot level of Mount Hood posed a significant challenge. A bulldozer was employed to cut a twisting road up the mountain, and covered wagons and heavy equipment were hauled by caterpillar tractors. An enormous steel cable was attached to the wagons to prevent them from falling down the side of the mountain. Cast and crew members were transported up the mountain by riding a mile-long ski lift. The sternwheeler Henderson, named River Queen in the film, had been built in 1912 and was modified to resemble a ship of the film's much earlier era.

Arthur Kennedy, who plays Emerson Cole, sprained his knee while filming a violent fight scene.

== Release ==
To promote the film, a 3.6-mile (5.8 km) steamboat race on the Columbia River was staged on January 24, 1952, featuring the Henderson, with several of the film's stars aboard, against the newer sternwheeler Portland. The Henderson won the race.

In the United Kingdom in the 1950s, the film was released under the title Where the River Bends.

== Reception ==
In a contemporary review for The New York Times, critic Bosley Crowther called the film "a present for the Western outdoor fans" and wrote: "The distinction of 'Bend of the River' ... is the fact that it brings into conflict two rarely contending groups and keeps you guessing as to which of its male stars is going to turn out 'good' and which 'bad.'"

Critic Edwin Schallert of the Los Angeles Times wrote: "This is top-notch among productions of the great outdoors, magnificently photographed in Technicolor, and with the strong onmarching conflict to distinguish it from the rout and rabble of open-air films. ... The picture is a big one in its panoramas and its plot scope. It will be a winner with those who see it, and those who like the sort of film that Hollywood seems much of the while to do the best."

== Awards ==
In 2008, Bend of the River was nominated for inclusion in AFI's 10 Top 10 list of the greatest Western films.
