= The Man from Laramie =

1955 film by Anthony Mann

- Theatrical release poster
- Directed by: Anthony Mann
- Screenplay by: Philip Yordan; Frank Burt
- Based on: "The Man from Laramie"; 1954 serial in The Saturday Evening Post by Thomas T. Flynn
- Produced by: William Goetz
- Starring: James Stewart; Arthur Kennedy; Donald Crisp; Cathy O'Donnell; Alex Nicol; Aline MacMahon; Wallace Ford
- Cinematography: Charles Lang
- Edited by: William Lyon
- Music by: George Duning
- Color process: Technicolor
- Production company: William Goetz Productions
- Distributed by: Columbia Pictures
- Release dates: August 31, 1955 (New York City); September 20, 1955 (United States)
- Running time: 102 minutes
- Country: United States
- Language: English
- Box office: $3.3 million (US)

The Man from Laramie is a 1955 American Western film directed by Anthony Mann and starring James Stewart, Arthur Kennedy, Donald Crisp, and Cathy O'Donnell.

Written by Philip Yordan and Frank Burt, the film is about a stranger who defies a local cattle baron and his sadistic son by working for one of their oldest rivals. The film was adapted from a serial of the same title by Thomas T. Flynn, first published in The Saturday Evening Post in 1954, and thereafter as a novel in 1955.

Shot in Technicolor, The Man from Laramie was one of the first Westerns to be filmed in CinemaScope to capture the vastness of the scenery.

This is the fifth and final Western collaboration between Anthony Mann and James Stewart, the other four being Winchester '73 (1950), Bend of the River (1952), The Naked Spur (1953) and The Far Country (1954). Mann and Stewart also collaborated on three other films: Thunder Bay (1953), The Glenn Miller Story (1954) and Strategic Air Command (1955).

== Plot ==
While delivering supplies from Laramie to Coronado, a man named Will Lockhart comes across the burned remains of a cavalry team. Lockhart is on the hunt for whomever sold repeating rifles to the Apaches. They used the weapons in the cavalry ambush. His brother was in the unit, and Lockhart wants revenge. In town, he delivers his freight to Barbara Waggoman, a woman who yearns to abandon her father's store. Lockhart asks if there is any freight he can haul back to Laramie. Barbara suggests salt from the nearby dry lake.

While loading the salt, Lockhart and his men are confronted by a team led by a man named Dave Waggoman. He insists the salt is not common property, shoots Lockhart's mules and burns Lockhart's wagons. Dave's helper Vic Hansbro knows he is overreacting and urges Lockhart to leave the area.

Lockhart heads into town instead. After seeing Dave, he attacks him. Vic joins the fray. The fight is halted by wealthy landowner Alec Waggoman, Dave's father and Barbara's uncle. He offers to compensate Lockhart for his destroyed property.

A woman named Kate Canady offers Lockhart work on her ranch, but he declines. Barbara begs Vic to run away with her, but he insists that he stands to inherit part of Alec's ranch when he passes. He does not want to lose his sweat equity in the enterprise.

Later that night, local drunk Chris Boldt attacks Lockhart with a knife. Lockhart defends himself, and Boldt flees. Sheriff Tom Quigby arrests Lockhart when Boldt turns up dead. Alec visits Lockhart in his cell and reveals that he has dreamed about a tall, thin stranger coming to town and killing Dave. He asks Lockhart to leave, but Lockhart refuses.

Kate bails Lockhart out on the condition he run her ranch. Lockhart visits Alec to get his restitution. Alec estimates the value of his destroyed mules and carts at $600. After Lockhart leaves, Alec tells Vic he is deducting the payment from Vic's salary. He holds Vic responsible for Dave's hotheadedness. Vic reminds Alec of the promises he made about bequeathing a share of the ranch to him. Alec confesses his eyesight is failing and warns Vic he will disinherit him if he does not protect Dave.

As Lockhart is tending Kate's herd one day, Dave decides to run him off his family's land. He sneaks up on Lockhart and begins shooting at him. Lockhart shoots Dave through the hand. When Dave's men surround Lockhart, Dave takes Lockhart's gun and returns the favor, and then rushes off. Vic, having finished wrangling some cattle, pursues Dave. He catches up to Dave, who is sending smoke signals to the Apache. Dave and Vic have already sold 200 additional rifles to the tribe. Vic knows the Apache will unleash violence on everyone in the area if they pick up the rifles from their hiding spot. He begs Dave to abandon the scheme. Furious, Dave refuses to see reason. They struggle, and Vic kills Dave.

Lockhart is nursing his hand back at Kate's when the Sheriff arrives. He is investigating Dave's death and knows about the earlier shootout with Lockhart. Alec is convinced that Lockhart is responsible. After Dave's funeral, he rides out to confront Lockhart but can only shoot blindly.

Back at his ranch, Alec is puzzled by a payment for fencing wire that he does not need. He starts to fear Dave had disguised his purchase of the rifles and goes out looking for them. Vic follows and pleads with him not to investigate. As they climb the rocky hill where the rifles are stashed, Vic tries to physically restrain Alec, but accidentally pushes Alec over the hill.

Lockhart finds Alec and brings him to Kate's. He tells Lockhart about his son's scheme and where to find the rifles. When Lockhart gets to the cache, he finds Vic summoning the Apache. He forces Vic at gunpoint to help him shove the rifles off the cliff and destroy them. The Apache murder Vic for not fulfilling their contract.

While leaving Coronado, Lockhart tells Barbara to "ask anyone where to find Captain Lockhart" if she is ever in Laramie, confirming he was in the U.S. Cavalry.

== Cast ==
- James Stewart as Will Lockhart
- Arthur Kennedy as Vic Hansbro
- Donald Crisp as Alec Waggoman
- Cathy O'Donnell as Barbara Waggoman
- Alex Nicol as Dave Waggoman
- Aline MacMahon as Kate Canady
- Wallace Ford as Charley O'Leary
- Jack Elam as Chris Boldt
- John War Eagle as Frank Darrah
- James Millican as Tom Quigby
- Gregg Barton as Fritz
- Boyd Stockman as Spud Oxton
- Frank DeKova as Padre

== Production ==
Prior to The Man from Laramie, James Stewart and Anthony Mann had worked together on six films beginning in 1950. Stewart, impressed by Mann's work on the then-unreleased Devil's Doorway, had personally selected him to direct Winchester '73 after Fritz Lang left the production. The collaboration proved both critically and commercially successful for Stewart and raised Mann's profile enormously after a string of low-budget crime films. After Winchester '73, Mann directed Stewart in the westerns Bend of the River, The Naked Spur, and The Far Country, as well as the biographical drama The Glenn Miller Story and the adventure film Thunder Bay. The two would also collaborate for a final time on the military aviation film Strategic Air Command. However, The Man from Laramie would prove to be the last western that the two made together.

Producer Aaron Rosenberg says that the reason Stewart and Mann never worked together for a sixth Western collaboration after The Man from Laramie was a disagreement over the quality of Night Passage. Mann had been slated to direct the film and worked with Stewart on preproduction, but disagreed with the casting of Audie Murphy and had an argument with Stewart in which the veteran director dismissed the film as "trash". Mann quit the movie, replaced by director James Neilson, feeling that Stewart was only making the film so he could play his accordion. This enraged Stewart so much that the two didn't speak again.

== Theme song ==
The film's theme song was written by Lester Lee and Ned Washington. It was recorded in the United States by Al Martino and in the United Kingdom by Jimmy Young. Young's version achieved significant commercial success, topping the UK Singles Chart in October 1955, while Martino's version peaked at number 19 in the chart that September.

=== Chart performance ===
==== Jimmy Young ====
Chart (1955)	Peak position
UK Singles (Official Charts)	1

==== Al Martino ====
Chart (1955)	Peak position
UK Singles (Official Charts)	19

== Reception ==
In 2025, The Hollywood Reporter listed The Man from Laramie as having the best stunts of 1955.

== See also ==
- List of American films of 1955
