= The Hallelujah Trail =

1965 film by John Sturges

- Theatrical release poster by Robert McGinnis
- Directed by: John Sturges
- Screenplay by: John Gay
- Based on: The Hallelujah Trail by Bill Gulick
- Produced by: John Sturges
- Starring: Burt Lancaster; Lee Remick; Jim Hutton; Pamela Tiffin; Donald Pleasence; Brian Keith; Martin Landau
- Cinematography: Robert Surtees
- Edited by: Ferris Webster
- Music by: Elmer Bernstein
- Production company: The Mirisch Corporation
- Distributed by: United Artists
- Release dates: June 11, 1965 (Warner Cinerama Theatre); June 23, 1965 (United States)
- Running time: 165 minutes (Roadshow version); 155 minutes (1991 VHS version); 152 minutes (70mm version); 146 minutes (35mm version)
- Country: United States
- Language: English
- Budget: $7 million
- Box office: $4 million

The Hallelujah Trail is a 1965 American Western epic mockumentary film produced and directed by John Sturges, with top-billed stars Burt Lancaster, Lee Remick, Jim Hutton and Pamela Tiffin. It was based on the book of the same title (originally released as The Hallelujah Train) by Bill Gulick in 1963.

The film is a parody of the sweeping epic Western films of the era, with grand western vistas, a huge all-star cast, and stunt-filled action scenes—matched to a broad array of satire and slapstick comedy. It depicts a struggle between a businessman trying to deliver whiskey to Denver by wagon train, his striking Irish teamsters, a barfly militia from Denver eager to ensure that the liquid cargo reaches its destination, temperance women campaigners determined to destroy the booze, a swarm of Native Americans determined to hijack it, and—most essentially—a unit of the U.S. Cavalry trying to control the whole chaotic mess.

With a running time of 2 hours, 45 minutes, The film was one of several large-scale widescreen, long-form "epic" comedies produced in the 1960s, much like The Great Race and It's a Mad, Mad, Mad, Mad World, combined with the epic grandeur of the Western genre.

== Plot ==
In 1867, signs that the approaching winter will be a hard one produce agitation in the burgeoning mining town of Denver, as the hard-drinking citizenry fear a shortage of whiskey. Taking advice from Oracle Jones, a local guide and seer (but only when under the influence of alcohol), the populace arrange for a mass shipment of forty wagons full of whiskey to be delivered by the Wallingham Freighting Company. The whiskey wagon train heads out under the direction of company owner Frank Wallingham, who repeatedly describes himself as "a taxpayer and a good Republican".

This cargo becomes the target for several diverse groups, each with their own leaders and plans. Young Capt. Paul Slater of the United States Cavalry is assigned by Fort Russell commander Col. Thaddeus Gearhart to escort the Wallingham Wagon Train, and merely wishes to carry out his orders. A group of Irish teamsters, hired as wagon drivers, wishes to strike unless whiskey rations are distributed. Twice-widowed, crusading temperance leader Cora Templeton Massingale and her followers, informed of the alcoholic cargo, wish to intercept the train and destroy its contents; the group therefore sets out escorted by a second cavalry division under the command of a reluctant Col. Gearhart.

Gearhart's daughter is engaged to Capt. Slater but entranced by Mrs. Massingale's message. Despite their extremely different personalities and inability to see eye to eye, Gearhart and Cora Massingale fall in love. Cora is infatuated with Gearhart from the moment he rides into the fort and spends much of the film trying to win his affection.

Other interested parties include Sioux Indians, led by chiefs Five Barrels and Walks-Stooped-Over, and a Denver citizens' militia, led by Clayton Howell and guided by Oracle Jones, concerned about obtaining their precious supply of drinkables. Inevitably the various groups converge, and the ensuing property struggle is played out through a series of comic set pieces and several diplomatic overtures by an increasingly weary Gearhart. Highlights include a massive shoot-out between the concerned parties within a blinding sandstorm without a single injury, a hostage situation when the Indians capture the Temperance members in order to reinforce their demands for alcoholic drink, and Massingale tricking Wallingham into driving/leading his entire wagon train into a quicksand bog, where the wagons and their cargo sink into the pits. The participants then disperse, mostly disappointed; however, for Colonel Gearhart and Captain Slater the story ends with a double wedding, for Wallingham and Oracle with a lifetime supply of whiskey when buoyancy causes the barrels to erupt from the quicksand, and for the winter of 1867 to actually become one of the mildest ever.

== Cast ==
- Burt Lancaster as Colonel Thaddeus Gearhart
- Lee Remick as Cora Templeton Massingale
- Jim Hutton as Captain Paul Slater
- Pamela Tiffin as Louise Gearhart
- Donald Pleasence as Oracle Jones
- Brian Keith as Frank Wallingham
- Martin Landau as Walks-Stooped-Over
- John Anderson as Sergeant Buell
- Tom Stern as Kevin O'Flaherty
- Robert J. Wilke as Chief 5 Barrels
- Dub Taylor as Clayton Howell
- Whit Bissell as Hobbs, the newspaper editor
- Helen Kleeb as Henrietta, one of the temperance women
- Val Avery as bartender in Denver
- Noam Pitlik as Indian interpreter
- Billy Benedict as Simpson, one of the miners
- Hope Sommers as Mrs. Hasselrad, one of the temperance women
- Ted Markland as bandmaster of Company B
- Larry Duran as one of the brothers-in-law
- Jerry Gatlin as one of the brothers-in-law
- Marshall Reed as Lieutenant Carter, a member of the Cavalry
- James Burk as Elks Runner, one of the Indians
- John McKee as Rafe Pike, one of the townspeople
- Bing Russell as Homer, one of the miners
- Buff Brady as Bilkins, one of the miners
- Carl Pitti as Phillips, one of the cavalry troopers

Uncredited (in order of appearance)
John Dehner	Voice-over narrator
Eddie Little Sky	Crow Chief
Harry Wilson	One of the miners
Carol Henry	Sergeant Henry

== Narration ==
The film is presented in a pseudo-documentary style, with a tongue-in-cheek narrator (unbilled John Dehner) providing historical background and context, and periodically interrupting the story to point out animated charts illustrating strategic positions of various groups.

=== Opening ===
"The land at first — mountains… thrust forth from the molten darkness of the earth. Mountain and valley… the virgin West. High plateau… and red rock of sandstone — wilderness West. Prairie land… rolling on and on… to the end of sight. Oh, pioneer West! What fervent dreams lay half-buried in this land of promise — dreams crushed by a cruel nature — or the lance of an Indian warrior.

"Every page in history must have its beginning… and ours takes us to the year eighteen sixty-seven. An Army that had fought in the War Between the States — that had bravely battled in many an Indian campaign — now patrolled the West in a time of peace… with ever-present thoughts of home. The Indian was back on the reservation… where the Peace Commission of eighteen sixty-seven had met with various warlike tribes and secured certain promises from them… in return, papers were given the Indians certifying them to be good citizens who would obey the laws of the land. Many gifts were distributed… beads… pieces of cloth… ammunition… and war surplus rifles. Naturally, these rifles were quite unfamiliar to the Indians… and, of course, it was understood, these weapons were to be used solely for the purpose of hunting game.

"The leaves turned early in that year. It could be a long, hard winter. The signs were everywhere — in the high country, the morning frost would sometimes last until afternoon. Buffalo were feeding ravenously. Beaver were damming and storing with strange vigor. Horses and dogs were becoming shaggy-haired as never before. And it could be sensed in the booming, bustling mining town of Denver. Most historians agree that the events leading to the Battle of Whiskey Hills and the subsequent disaster at Quicksand Bottoms began here in Denver at a miners' meeting. Such meetings were frequent and held, usually, as part of the political fabric of the town. But the meeting of November fourth had a marked air of grim foreboding..."

=== Closing ===
"Companies A and B of the Cavalry escorted the ex-temperance marchers back to their husbands and hungry children at Fort Russell. It is to be assumed, some time passed before the Indians were able to regain their customary composure. But it is known that the exploits of their journey became tribal legend…to be told over and over again, from generation to generation… with slight revisions. The Denver free militia dissolved… never to march again. And of course, the strike of the Irish teamsters failed…and the Wallingham freighting company went bankrupt, having no visible assets....

"So ended the great disaster at Quicksand Bottoms. Oh, yes…Mrs. Massingale…Cora Templeton Massingale retired from all active participation in temperance movements. A military wedding was held at Fort Russell. As it turned out…it was a double wedding. A homestead claim was filed by Mister Jones and Mister Wallingham on a piece of land encompassing the entire Quicksand Bottoms area.

"It's not to be denied that there were occasional re-emergences of whisky kegs, which kept Mister Jones and Mister Wallingham…eeh…eeeh…quite…content for a number of years… and, in spite of all predictions, shaggy hair and busy beaver to the contrary, the winter of eighteen sixty-seven turned out to be the driest and warmest on record. Such was the year…oh, pioneer West…and the days of the Hallelujah Trail."

== Production ==
The film one of several that was filmed in Ultra Panavision 70 and presented in selected theaters via the oversized Super Cinerama process. Originally budgeted at around $4.5 million, the budget reportedly ballooned to $7 million—an estimated $1.5 million over final budget, with an additional $3.5 million planned for prints and advertising. The artwork for the title and credit sequences was created by Robert McGinnis.

James Garner, Lee Marvin, and Art Carney were initially offered the roles which later went to Lancaster, Keith, and Pleasence. The film marked the first comedic role for Lancaster.

The film was primarily shot on location in and around Gallup, New Mexico from July to November 1964. But during heavy rains there, some shots were filmed in Hollywood, California, with interior shots at Paramount and Goldwyn studios.

Veteran stuntman Bill Williams was killed on November 13, 1964, while performing a stunt involving a wagon going over a cliff. The scene was kept in the movie.

Actor John Moya was to have his feature film acting debut in The Hallelujah Trail, and was announced as a cast member in July, 1964. However, on his first day in front of the camera, a scorpion stung him, and he had to be hospitalized. It was the second of big budgeted Westerns in which Jim Hutton was third billed, following Major Dundee.

== Release ==
Conceived as a comic epic that would be long enough to need an intermission, the film was originally 181 minutes long, but audience responses from initial screenings in Minneapolis and Detroit triggered a cut to 165 minutes. Even so, some subsequent critics would pan it as too long.

A premiere was screened on June 11, 1965, at the Warner Cinerama Theatre, with public showings starting there June 23. The next week, June 30, 1965, a premiere was held at New York City's Capitol Theatre.

On October 19, 1968, three years and four months after its release, the film had its television premiere in a three-hour timeslot on NBC Saturday Night at the Movies.

== Reception ==
=== Initial reception ===
New York Times critic Bosley Crowther panned the "plush Cinerama-size extravagance," as a "slow and tedious" "slapstick" film because of being 45 minutes longer than would have been successful—adding that, had it been only 2 hours, it could have been "fairly funny" and conceivably "even [a] classic spoof" of traditional "cavalry-and-Indian" films. He complimented the Western scenery, "especially in vista shots," despite the illogical images of mountains lining a route across Nebraska to Denver.

Variety, on the other hand, praised it as among "the nuttiest cinematic mishmashes" ever seen, thoroughly spoofing the Western genre and "beautifully packaged." The review admired the way actors "played it straight," as if their characters were quite earnestly serious about their actions. They particularly credited Burt Lancaster's performance as the "harassed cavalry colonel," and Martin Landau's "deadpan" act as an Indian chief, performing comedy "mostly with his eyes."

The Los Angeles Times and Daily Variety praised the film as well.

=== Evaluation in film guides ===
Leonard Maltin's Movie Guide (2013 edition) gives The Hallelujah Trail 2½ stars (out of 4), describing Lee Remick's character as a "rambunctious temperance leader" and concluding the write-up with "amiable but lumbering Western satire goes on and on". The capsule review also mentions that the film "includes an overture, intermission/entr'acte, exit music".

Steven H. Scheuer's Movies on TV (1972–73 edition) had a much lower opinion, giving it its lowest rating of 1 star (out of 4) and deciding that there is "[V]ery little to cheer about in this muddled western saga, as director John Sturges and the stars stumble down a long — almost three hours — and banal path that has been explored much more satisfactorily by countless film makers in the past". Describing the plot as "clumsy" and singling out "thirsty Hollywood-caricature Indians", the review concludes that "Lancaster looks understandably bored to death, and Lee Remick is miscast and wasted". By the time of the 1986–87 edition, Scheuer slightly ups the rating to 1½ stars and shortens the capsule to a single sentence which calls it a "clumsy comedy" and mentions the "thirsty Indians".

The Motion Picture Guide (1987 edition) assigned 2½ stars (out of 5), concluding that "[B]asically, this is one-joke plot with a few vignettes and gags strung on along the way. The whole thing is held together by an understated narration by Dehner, which itself is fairly clever. Still, the depiction of the Indians in this film is more than a little unsettling."

Two additional guides rank the production slightly higher and lower — Mick Martin's and Marsha Porter's DVD & Video Guide (2007 edition) dispenses 3 stars (out of 5), reminding that "[T]hose who fondly remember television's F Troop should adore this cavalry comedy", concluding that it is "[O]verlong, but fun nonetheless", while Videohound's Golden Movie Retriever (2011 edition) throws it only two bones (out of possible four), mentioning Lee Remick's "bevy of ladies against liquor" standing "between the shipment and the would-be whistle whetters" and concluding that it is a "[L]imp Western satire directed by Preston Sturges' brother [Videohound is incorrect — the two directors were not related], who fared much better when he kept a straight face (he also directed The Great Escape)".

Among British references, Leslie Halliwell, in Film and Video Guide (5th edition, 1985), gave no stars (Halliwell's top rating is 4), dismissing it as an "[A]bsurdly inflated, prolonged, uninventive comedy western with poor narrative grip; all dressed up and nowhere to go".

== Awards and recognition ==
Composer Elmer Bernstein's and writer Ernie Sheldon's score for the film won the 1966 Western Heritage Award for Music, from the National Cowboy and Western Heritage Museum.

Female lead actor Lee Remick was a 1966 nominee for the Golden Laurel for "Comedy Performance, Female".

== Comic book adaption ==
- Dell Movie Classic: The Hallelujah Trail (February 1966)

== See also ==
- List of American films of 1965
