= Symphony No. 3 (Bernstein) =

1963 symphony by Leonard Bernstein

- Kaddish
- by Leonard Bernstein
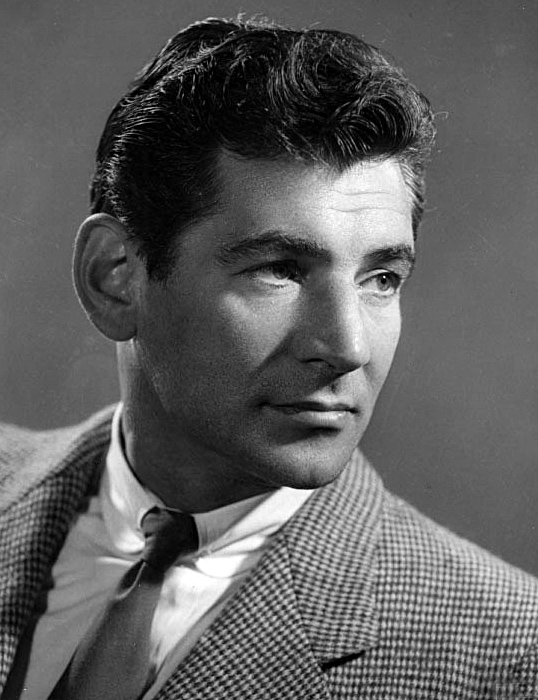
- The composer in the 1950s
- Text: Kaddish; narration by Leonard Bernstein
- Composed: 1963
- Dedication: Memory of John F. Kennedy
- Performed: December 10, 1963
- Movements: three
- Scoring: soprano; narrator; boys' choir mixed choir; orchestra

Symphony No. 3 "Kaddish" is a programmatic choral symphony by Leonard Bernstein, published in 1963. It is a dramatic work written for a large orchestra, a full choir, a boys' choir, a soprano soloist and a narrator. "Kaddish" refers to the Jewish prayer that is chanted at every synagogue service for the dead but never mentions "death".

The symphony is dedicated to the memory of John F. Kennedy, who was assassinated on November 22, 1963, just weeks before the first performance of the symphony. Bernstein wrote the text of the narration himself, but struggled with his own motivation for the aggressiveness of the text.

== Instrumentation ==
The revised version is scored for:

- speaker
- soprano solo
- mixed choir (SATB)
- boys' choir
- orchestra:
  - 4 flutes (3rd doubling alto flute, 4th doubling piccolo), 2 oboes, cor anglais, alto saxophone, 2 clarinets in B♭ and A, bass clarinet, clarinet in E♭, 2 bassoons, contrabassoon
  - 4 horns, trumpet in D, 3 trumpets in C, 3 trombones, tuba
  - 5 timpani, 4 percussionists playing: vibraphone, xylophone, glockenspiel, 3 side drums (snare drum, field drum, tenor drum), bass drum, Israeli hand drum, 2 suspended cymbals, 1 pair crash cymbals, finger cymbals, antique cymbals (E, G, B, C), tamtam, 3 bongos, 3 temple blocks, wood block, sandpaper blocks, rasp, whip, ratchet, triangle, maracas, claves, tambourine, chimes
  - harp, piano, celesta
  - strings consisting of first and second violins, violas, cellos, and double basses.

== Structure ==
The music develops from serial techniques like atonality and tone rows to tonal lyricism.

=== I. Invocation – Kaddish 1 ===
The text begins with a narrator addressing "My Father" (i.e., God). They state that they want to pray a kaddish. After the initial approach to the Father in prayer, a chorus sings his kaddish in Aramaic. At the end, the narrator repeats the final words of the prayer:

Amen! Amen! Did You hear that, Father?
Sh'lama raba! May abundant peace Descend on us. Amen.

The speaker then questions why He would allow such disorder in mankind's lives, suggesting that surely He must have the power to change it.

=== II. Din-Torah – Kaddish 2 ===
The prayer escalates into a confrontation with the Father (who never replies in the symphony), and in a "certain respectful fury", accusing him of violating his promise with mankind. One of the more poignant texts from the symphony comes from this movement:

Are You listening, Father? You know who I am:
Your image; that stubborn reflection of You
That Man has shattered, extinguished, banished.
And now he runs free—free to play
With his new-found fire, avid for death,
Voluptuous, complete and final death.
Lord God of Hosts, I call You to account!
You let this happen, Lord of Hosts!
You with Your manna, Your pillar of fire!
You ask for faith, where is Your own?
Why have You taken away Your rainbow,
That pretty bow You tied round Your finger
To remind You never to forget Your promise?

"For lo, I do set my bow in the cloud ...
And I will look upon it, that I
May remember my everlasting covenant ..."
Your covenant! Your bargain with Man!
Tin God! Your bargain is tin!
It crumples in my hand!
And where is faith now—Yours or mine?

The speaker calms down, speaks softly and suggests that he comfort God. A soprano solo conveys a lullaby, intended to help the speaker rock God gently to sleep, after which the speaker will help God dream.

=== III. Scherzo – Kaddish 3 – Finale. Fugue-Tutti ===
The scherzo is a fast-tempo dream sequence. God has fallen asleep and the narrator paints a dream. God is no longer in control and the narrator has full power to bring God on this journey through their own imagination. The speaker begins by painting what God has made:

This is Your Kingdom of Heaven, Father,
Just as You planned it.
Every immortal cliché intact.
Lambs frisk. Wheat ripples.
Sunbeams dance. Something is wrong.
The light: flat. The air: sterile.
Do You know what is wrong?
There is nothing to dream.
Nowhere to go. Nothing to know.

The narrator then proceeds to show God that they are in control of this dream.

Now behold my Kingdom of Earth!
Real-life marvels! Genuine wonders!
Dazzling miracles! ...
Look, a Burning Bush
Look, a Fiery Wheel!
A Ram! A Rock! Shall I smite it? There!
It gushes! It gushes! And I did it!
I am creating this dream!
Now will You believe?

A burning bush and gushing rock refer to some of the miracles described in the Book of Exodus. The narrator next places a rainbow in the sky, in parallel to the story of Noah, when God placed a rainbow in the sky to institute a new covenant with man. In loud triumph and anger, the speaker declares:

Look at it, Father: Believe! Believe!
Look at my rainbow and say after me:
Magnified ... and sanctified ...
Be the great name of man!

After showing God the problems in the world, they help God believe in the new arrangement. The music builds to a climax, crowned with the entrance of a boy's choir singing the phrase "Magnified and sanctified be His great name, Amen" in Hebrew.

The pace of the music slows down, as the narrator has finished his dream. He wakes God and God then confronts the reality of the image. The narrator, satisfied that God has seen His errors, beams:

Good morning, Father. We can still be immortal,
You and I, bound by our rainbow.
That is our covenant, and to honor it
Is our honor ... not quite the covenant
We bargained for, so long ago.

The narration ends with a commitment from both sides, God and Human, to "Suffer and recreate each other."

Though there is a resolution to the struggle, the music does not end triumphant and grand. Instead, it ends in a final kaddish by the choir and the final chord is dissonant, suggesting that all is still not right and more work must be done.

== Performance ==
The symphony was first performed in Tel Aviv, Israel, on December 10, 1963, with Bernstein conducting the Israel Philharmonic Orchestra, Jennie Tourel (mezzo-soprano), Hanna Rovina (narrator) and the choruses under Abraham Kaplan. In this original version of the Kaddish Symphony, Bernstein specified that the narrator be female. The work was generally received with great enthusiasm in Israel.

The American premiere of the work took place soon afterwards on the afternoon of January 31, 1964, in Boston with Charles Münch conducting the Boston Symphony Orchestra, the New England Conservatory Chorus and the Columbus Boychoir, again with Tourel (mezzo), but now with Bernstein's wife, Felicia Montealegre as narrator. The American reactions to the work were decidedly mixed, ranging from highly favorable to vitriolic.

In 1977 Bernstein revised the symphony, saying: "I was not satisfied with the original (version). There was too much talk. The piece is ... (now) tighter and shorter." With the revision, Bernstein no longer specified the gender of the narrator, and recordings featuring both male and female narrators have been made. In the first recording below (which is of the original version for female narrator), the narrator was Bernstein's wife, Felicia Montealegre, whereas in the second and third recordings below (which were of the revised work), the narrators were men, Michael Wager and Willard White.

The first performance in France took place in 1994, and was carried out by the Formation Symphonique of the Chœur et Orchestre des Grandes Écoles with Mari Kobayashi as soloist and Michael Lonsdale as the narrator.

In November 2017, Kaddish was performed in three concerts by the New York Philharmonic to commemorate Bernstein's 100th birthday at David Geffen Hall, with Tamara Wilson (soprano), Jeremy Irons (narrator), and Leonard Slatkin conducting.

In 2003, after talks with Bernstein shortly before his death in 1990, Holocaust survivor Samuel Pisar added a new narration about his personal experiences and how his family suffered and were murdered in the Holocaust, and his subsequent struggle with his belief. Pisar wrote this version of the text for the Kaddish Symphony "in memory of Leonard Bernstein, a beloved friend". The Bernstein estate allowed this version to be used only with Samuel Pisar as recitator before his 2015 death.

== Recordings ==
- Recording of the US premiere (first version) with Charles Munch conducting the Boston Symphony Orchestra, the New England Conservatory Chorus and the Columbus Boychoir with Jennie Tourel (mezzo-soprano) and Felicia Montealegre (narrator) (Kipepeo) recorded in 1964 and released in 2017
- Premiere studio recording (first version) with Bernstein conducting the New York Philharmonic, Columbus Boychoir and Camerata Singers with Jennie Tourel (mezzo-soprano) and Felicia Montealegre (narrator) (Columbia Masterworks, Stereo KS 6605)
- Premiere recording (revised version), with Bernstein conducting the Israel Philharmonic Orchestra and Vienna Boys' Choir with Montserrat Caballé (soprano) and Michael Wager (narrator) (Deutsche Grammophon 463462)
- Gerard Schwarz conducting the Royal Liverpool Philharmonic, Royal Liverpool Philharmonic Choir, Liverpool Cathedral Choir and Liverpool Philharmonic Youth Choir with Yvonne Kenny (soprano) and Willard White (narrator) (Naxos 8559456)
- Yutaka Sado conducting the French Radio Orchestra and Chorus with Karita Mattila (soprano) and Yehudi Menuhin (narrator) (Erato2564 69655-6) recorded in 1999 and released in 2008.
- Leonard Slatkin conducting the BBC Symphony Orchestra and Chorus, the BBC Singers, London Oratory School Schola, with Ann Murray (soprano) and Jamie Bernstein (narrator) (Chandos CHSA 5028)
