= Moonlight in Havana =

1942 film by Anthony Mann

- Directed by: Anthony Mann
- Screenplay by: Oscar Brodney
- Produced by: Bernard W. Burton
- Starring: Allan Jones; Jane Frazee; Marjorie Lord
- Cinematography: Charles Van Enger
- Edited by: Russell F. Schoengarth
- Music by: Charles Previn
- Distributed by: Universal Studios
- Release date: October 8, 1942 (Los Angeles)
- Running time: 63 minutes
- Country: United States
- Language: English

Moonlight in Havana is a 1942 American film romantic comedy directed by Anthony Mann and featuring Allan Jones, Jane Frazee, and Marjorie Lord. This was Mann's second film as director. Choreography by Lester Horton.

== Plot ==
Baseball star Johnny "Whizzer" Norton has been suspended by manager Eddie Daniels and the New York Blue Sox for his incorrigible behavior. When nightclub owner Barney Crane happens to hear Johnny singing, he offers him a job in the club where Gloria Jackson is currently the star performer.

Johnny is not interested until he hears Crane wants to take the whole troupe to Havana, Cuba, to entertain. Knowing that the Blue Sox have training camp in Havana, he agrees to the trip, which includes a boat voyage where the singers entertain.

Complications begin in Cuba as soon as Gloria comes to suspect Johnny's real reason for being there, while Patsy Clark, daughter of Blue Sox owner Joe Clark, shows a romantic interest in Johnny. He is reinstated by the team and quits the stage act, but has a change of heart, returning to show business and to Gloria.

== Cast ==
- Allan Jones as Johnny Norton
- Jane Frazee as Gloria Jackson
- Marjorie Lord as Patsy Clark
- William Frawley as Barney Crane
- Don Terry as Eddie Daniels
- Wade Boteler as Joe Clark
- Helen Lynd as Daisy
