= Leo Sauvage =

French journalist (1913–1988)

- Born: Léopold Smotriez; February 23, 1913; Mannheim, Germany
- Died: October 30, 1988 (aged 75); New York City, New York, U.S.
- Education: Universite de Paris
- Occupations: Journalist, writer, arts critic
- Spouse: Barbara Suchowolska (m.)
- Children: 3, including Pierre Sauvage
- Relatives: Samuel Pisar (nephew)

Leo Sauvage (né Léopold Smotriez; February 23, 1913 – October 30, 1988) was a German and French journalist, writer, and arts critic.

== Life and career ==
Leo Sauvage was born Léopold Smotriez on February 23, 1913, in Mannheim, Germany. However, some citations state his place of birth as Nancy, France. He was Jewish.

Sauvage studied at the Universite de Paris. During World War II he ran a Marseille theatre company that was eventually shut down for mocking the collaborationist Vichy regime.

In 1948, Sauvage moved to the United States to work as a correspondent for Agence France Presse. Two years later he joined Le Figaro. He was a foreign correspondent for that newspaper until 1975 when he resigned to become drama critic for The New Leader.

Sauvage was one of the earliest critics of the Warren Commission, which concluded that Lee Harvey Oswald alone killed US president John F. Kennedy. Sauvage was skeptical of the official explanation from the beginning, having visited Dallas just days after the assassination. He found himself unimpressed by how the Dallas PD conducted its investigation. In March 1964 he published an article in Commentary posing a series of questions that, in his view, Oswald's accusers must be forced to answer. In 1966 his book The Oswald Affair was among a wave of books that year to undermine public confidence in the Warren Report. He penned the introduction to Accessories After the Fact (1967) by fellow Warren Commission critic Sylvia Meagher. In 1976 he was interviewed for the French documentary "Le Mystere Kennedy" (trans. "The Kennedy Mystery").

In 1973 he published Che Guevara: The Failure of a Revolutionary, a critical biography of Che. His book Les Américans (1983), an examination of American culture, became a bestseller in France.

In 1988 Leo Sauvage died of a heart attack in his Manhattan apartment. He was 75. He was survived by his wife Barbara Suchowolska, and their three children. His nephew-in-law was Samuel Pisar.

Sauvage was paid tribute to by the French minister for culture, Jack Lang, who sent a telegram to Sauvage's eldest son Pierre, remarking that he was "a man of talent and courage, he embodied the honor of great journalism".

== Bibliography ==
- The Oswald Affair. World Publishing Company. 1966.
- Che Guevara: The Failure of a Revolutionary. Prentice-Hall. 1973. ISBN 978-0131283305.
- Les Américains. Primeur. 1983. ISBN 978-2892860023.
- Les Etats-Unis Face à l'Amérique Centrale. Balland. 1985.
