= Dr. Broadway =

1942 film by Anthony Mann

- Theatrical release poster
- Directed by: Anthony Mann
- Screenplay by: Borden Chase and Art Arthur
- Produced by: Sol C. Siegel
- Starring: Macdonald Carey; Jean Phillips; Eduardo Ciannelli; Richard Lane; J. Carrol Naish; Joan Woodbury; Arthur Loft
- Cinematography: Theodor Sparkuhl
- Edited by: Arthur P. Schmidt
- Music by: Robert Emmett Dolan; Paul Sawtell
- Production company: Paramount Pictures
- Distributed by: Paramount Pictures
- Release date: May 9, 1942
- Running time: 68 minutes
- Country: United States
- Language: English

Dr. Broadway is a 1942 American mystery film directed by Anthony Mann (in his directorial debut) and written by Borden Chase and Art Arthur. The film stars Macdonald Carey, Jean Phillips, Eduardo Ciannelli, Richard Lane, J. Carrol Naish, Joan Woodbury and Arthur Loft. The film was released on May 9, 1942, by Paramount Pictures.

== Plot ==
After foiling a phony suicide attempt by Connie Madigan, an aspiring actress seeking publicity by stepping onto a ledge, Dr. Tim Kane, who practices medicine in the Broadway district of New York City, vouches for her to keep Connie from being arrested and hires her as his assistant.

Doc is warned by his Broadway cronies about gangster Vic Telli being released from prison. Doc's testimony had put Vic behind bars. Vic turns up, but impressed by Doc's honesty, says he is dying and asks Doc to find his long-missing daughter, Margie Dove, so he can bequeath her his fortune.

Vic ends up dead with rival racketeer Jack Venner trying to get his money, assisted by a woman pretending to be Margie. In the end, Doc's life is saved by Connie going back out onto the ledge, tossing a shoe at the people below. The police nab the villain and Doc helps Connie back inside, but not before kissing her.

== Cast ==
- Macdonald Carey as Dr. Timothy Kane / Dr. Broadway
- Jean Phillips as Connie Madigan
- Eduardo Ciannelli as Vic Telli
- Richard Lane as Police Sgt. Patric
- J. Carrol Naish as Jack Venner
- Joan Woodbury as Margie Dove
- Arthur Loft as Capt. Mahoney
- Warren Hymer as Maxie the Goat
- Frank Bruno as Marty Weber
- Sid Melton as Louie La Conga
- Olin Howland as Professor
- Gerald Mohr as Red
- Abe Dinovitch as Benny
- Thomas W. Ross as Magistrate
- Charles C. Wilson as Dist. Atty. McNamara
- Spencer Charters as Oscar Titus
- Mary Gordon as Broadway Carrie
- Jay Novello as Greeny
- John Gallaudet as Al
- Al Hill as Jerry
- Edward Earle as Hayes (uncredited)
- John Hamilton as Joe (uncredited)

== Production ==
Mann agreed to direct the film on the encouragement of Preston Sturges who worked with Mann on Sullivan's Travels. Sturges said Mann should direct any film he could if the opportunity came up. Mann later said of the film "I think it had some good things in it. I remember very warmly the cameraman, an oldtimer name of Spatkuhl, who had done many films for UFA and Lubitsch, and he was a great help. Nobody else cared a damn about the picture. They said: ‘Don’t build sets; don’t do anything. You have to get finished in 18 days and, if you don’t, the cameras are taken from you and you’re out’."
