= T. T. Flynn =

- Born: Theodore Thomas Flynn; August 8, 1902; Indianapolis, Indiana, United States
- Died: January 8, 1979 (aged 76); Baton Rouge, Louisiana, United States
- Years active: 1942–1967
- Spouse(s): Mary Cecilia Derene (1924–1929; her death); Unknown (1930–????; divorced); Helen Brown (????–1979; his death)
- Children: Mary (a daughter with his second wife); Two sons with his third wife

Theodore Thomas ("T. T.") Flynn (August 8, 1902 – January 8, 1979) was an American writer of pulp fiction in multiple genres. Later in life he concentrated on Westerns. As an author, he is most famous for writing The Man from Laramie which was adapted to film starring actor James Stewart.

== Life and career ==
Flynn was born in Indianapolis, Indiana. He graduated from Indianapolis Technical High School, and at the age of fourteen joined the merchant navy to work his way across the world. He worked various jobs like fireman, oiler, mess boy, steersman, and ship's carpenter.

In 1924 he was married to Mary Cecilia Derene and settled back in the United States working for a railroad, first as a brakeman, then in a roundhouse. At this time he also began writing fiction for pulp magazines under the name T.T. Flynn. Initially he wrote sea stories based on his own experiences and other stories he had heard.

After being fired in 1925, Flynn began writing full-time, becoming a client of Luke Short's literary agent, Marguerite E. Harper in 1925, selling twelve of his first fourteen stories to Flynn's, a detective magazine edited by William J. Flynn, former director of the Bureau of Investigation. Flynn's wife suffered from tuberculosis so they moved first to Albuquerque, New Mexico in 1928 to take advantage of the cleaner air. Six months later they took up residence in a trailer in Santa Fe. Flynn felt the need to travel and experience new things to keep his stories fresh.

After Lindbergh's 1927 flight across the Atlantic spurred new interest in aviation. Flynn decided to take flying lessons at the Franklin-Speakman airfield near Albuquerque to lend authenticity to his tales for Air Stories, the premier aviation pulp of the day.

On August 11, 1929, his first wife died, and he remarried in 1930. His second marriage ended in divorce with one daughter named after his first wife, and he married a third time. This marriage lasted till he died, and he had two sons from this marriage.

In the 1930s Flynn's byline appeared on the covers of many detective pulps including Clues, Detective Fiction Weekly and Dime Detective. When Dime Western was launched, the editor, Rogers Terrill, asked Flynn to write a story for him. The first 1933 issue of Star Western featured a T.T. Flynn story. Flynn soon moved to New Mexico and lived in a trailer while exploring the American West, which added authentic local color to his fiction. Flynn began to regularly supply western stories from then onward. By 1938, he was also a regular contributor to Street and Smith's Western Story Magazine.

By the time of the World War II paper shortages Flynn began to turn out westerns for the newborn paperback market.

In 1954, Flynn made his first and only sale to the Saturday Evening Post. The Man from Laramie appeared as a serial novel in eight issues from January 2 to February 20. In 1955, this was made into a film starring Jimmy Stewart. Another novel, Two Faces West, was optioned for film but never appeared.

Many of Flynn's westerns remain in print and some of his series characters for various detective magazines have been collected by Altus Press.

In the 1960s, Flynn stopped writing as more of his time was spent on racetracks, following the horses from race to race. In January, 1978, he and his wife, Helen, moved to Baton Rouge, where he died on 8 January 1979.
