= Pierre Sauvage =

French-American documentary filmmaker and lecturer

Pierre Sauvage (born in 1944 in Le Chambon-sur-Lignon, France) is a French-American documentary filmmaker and public speaker. A child survivor of the Holocaust, he was described by Tablet Magazine as "a filmmaker of rare moral perception."

== Documentary filmmaker ==
Sauvage is best known for his 1989-2025 feature documentary, Weapons of the Spirit, which tells the story of what the film calls a "conspiracy of goodness": how a Christian mountain community in Nazi-occupied France took in and saved five thousand Jews, including Sauvage and his parents. Sauvage himself was born in this unique Christian oasis—the area of Le Chambon-sur-Lignon—at a time when much of his family was being tortured and murdered in the Nazi death camps. But it was only at the age of 18 that he learned that he and his family were Jewish and survivors of the Holocaust.

Of Weapons of the Spirit, Samantha Power, then U.S. Ambassador to the United Nations, said publicly at a screening: "I’ve seen the film several times, but what is striking about re-watching it is that the questions it asks—both of its subjects and of its viewers—always feel profoundly relevant. Today, as you will see, is no exception." Tom Shales of the Washington Post wrote: "An absolutely extraordinary story about matter-of-fact heroes. In a hundred years, it is likely to be timely still."

The film won numerous awards, including the prestigious DuPont-Columbia Award in Broadcast Journalism—sharing the documentary award with Ken Burns' The Civil War series. The film had a 50-city theatrical release, received two national prime-time broadcasts on PBS in 1990—accompanied by Bill Moyers' probing interview of the filmmaker—and remains one of the most widely used documentary teaching tools on the Holocaust, both in its full-length version and in an abridged Classroom Version. A remastered wide-screen edition of the film will finally be released in 2025.

Also scheduled soon for release or re-release are three other documentaries by Sauvage. Not Idly By: Peter Bergson, America and the Holocaust provides the challenging and eloquent testimony of Peter Bergson, a militant Jew from Palestine who led a determined and controversial American effort to fight the Holocaust. Bergson, interviewed separately in 1978 by Laurence Jarvik and then Claude Lanzmann, "rages with a Hebrew prophet's fury," wrote Dara Horn in The Atlantic. Yiddish: the Mother Tongue is the 1979 Emmy Award-winning portrait of the unique and tenacious Yiddish language and culture. We Were There: Christians and the Holocaust features the testimony of four French Righteous Christians (Madeleine Barot, pastor André Dumas, Jean-Marie Soutou, and Magda Trocmé), as well as the challenging views of Rev. Franklin Littell.

Upcoming is A Year That Mattered: Varian Fry and the Refugee Crisis, 1940-1941, a feature documentary about the most successful private American rescue effort of the Nazi era. In Marseille, France, after France fell to the Nazis, a New York intellectual named Varian Fry led a tiny group that helped to save as many as 2,000 people, including many luminaries of that time. In a paper presented in 2000 at the Remembering for the Future conference at Oxford University, Sauvage argued that "Viewed within the context of its time, Fry's mission seems not 'merely' an attempt to save some threatened writers, artists, and political figures. It appears in hindsight like a doomed final quest to reverse the very direction in which the world was heading."

While celebrating some remarkable Americans—Varian Fry, Miriam Davenport, Mary Jayne Gold, Charles Fawcett, Leon Ball, Hiram Bingham IV—the documentary places the story in the context of those challenging times, addressing American policies then towards the unwanted refugees. Sauvage's footage, author Dara Horn reported in her book People Love Dead Jews, introduced her "to several exceedingly intelligent, colorful, and sincere Americans (none of them Jewish)". One of these Americans is Mary Jayne Gold, who wrote a memoir, Crossroads Marseilles 1940, to which Sauvage inherited the rights. Originally published by Doubleday in the U.S. in 1980, subsequently published in France in 2001 to considerable acclaim (with Sauvage contributing an afterword), the book, long out-of-print in English, is Gold's account of how this beautiful heiress from the Midwest participated in and helped to subsidize the Varian Fry rescue mission—while concurrently having an affair with a young French gangster.

Retrospectives of his documentaries have been held in Paris, Le Chambon-sur-Lignon, and the United States.

== Honoring the memory of the area of Le Chambon-sur-Lignon ==
In June 2004, Sauvage initiated and played a key role in organizing a "Liberation Reunion" that took place in Le Chambon-sur-Lignon for the 60th anniversary of D-Day. Sauvage's efforts contributed to French President Jacques Chirac's decision to make a major address in Le Chambon on July 8, 2004. When Chirac used the occasion to celebrate the values of the Republic, Sauvage wrote an article in the French daily Le Figaro pointing out that the values that had been implemented in Le Chambon were older than the French republic. Former French President Nicolas Sarkozy, shortly after his election, made time to view Weapons of the Spirit and called it "deeply moving." Sauvage spent five years trying unsuccessfully to create a historical museum in his birthplace of Le Chambon and overseeing a temporary exhibit area in the heart of the village. In 2013, a museum Lieu de Mémoire, spearheaded by then Le Chambon-sur-Lignon Mayor Éliane Wauquiez-Motte, was at last inaugurated in the village, with Sauvage presenting the French version of Weapons of the Spirit on this occasion.

== Biographical information ==
Sauvage is the son of once prominent French journalist and author Léo Sauvage (born Smotriez), and his Polish-born wife Barbara Sauvage, née Suchowolska. Sauvage was four when he and his parents moved to the Upper West Side of New York City in 1948, his parents choosing to hide the fact that they were Jewish. Sauvage returned to Paris at 18 to pursue his studies, staying with his cousin, Samuel Pisar, the Holocaust survivor, attorney, and author, who was to become the stepfather of former U.S. Secretary of State Antony Blinken. The Sorbonne drop-out fell in love with film at Paris' Cinémathèque Française, becoming a film scholar and landing a job there working for the pioneering film archivist Henri Langlois. Veteran émigré producer-director Otto Preminger brought Sauvage back to New York as a story editor.

In the U.S., Sauvage co-authored with Jean-Pierre Coursodon a two-volume critical study of American film directors, American Directors (E.P. Dutton, 1983), characterized in The New York Times by Peter Biskind as "highly informed, literate, trenchant." He has long been the Los Angeles correspondent for the influential French film monthly Positif.

Although he had contributed to a documentary about the artist Robert Malaval in the '60s, Sauvage settled behind the camera as a staff producer-reporter for Los Angeles public television station KCET-TV, producing over thirty hours of varied programming dealing with a wide range of subjects, including the national PBS series Academy Leaders. His first major success came when he decided to begin exploring Jewish roots he had never known in Yiddish: the Mother Tongue.

Sauvage lives in Los Angeles, with his wife, entertainment lawyer and professor Barbara M. Rubin. They have two children: master empath David Sauvage and television trailer editor Rebecca Sauvage. In 2020, at a ceremony at the Museum of Jewish Heritage in New York City, Sauvage was named a knight in the French National Order of Merit. He says he plans to continue galloping as long as he can.

== Lecturer on Le Chambon, and on America and the Holocaust ==
For over 40 years, a lecturer on the Holocaust and its continuing challenges, Sauvage has been one of a handful of experts on rescuers of Jews during the Holocaust—"righteous Gentiles"—and contends that they still have much to teach us. He has also focused his efforts on what he has called the American experience of the Holocaust, urging Americans to look in as well as out. A key mentor for Sauvage in this effort was historian David S. Wyman, who died in 2018 and to whom Sauvage has paid tribute.
