= Cerekvička-Rosice =

- Municipality
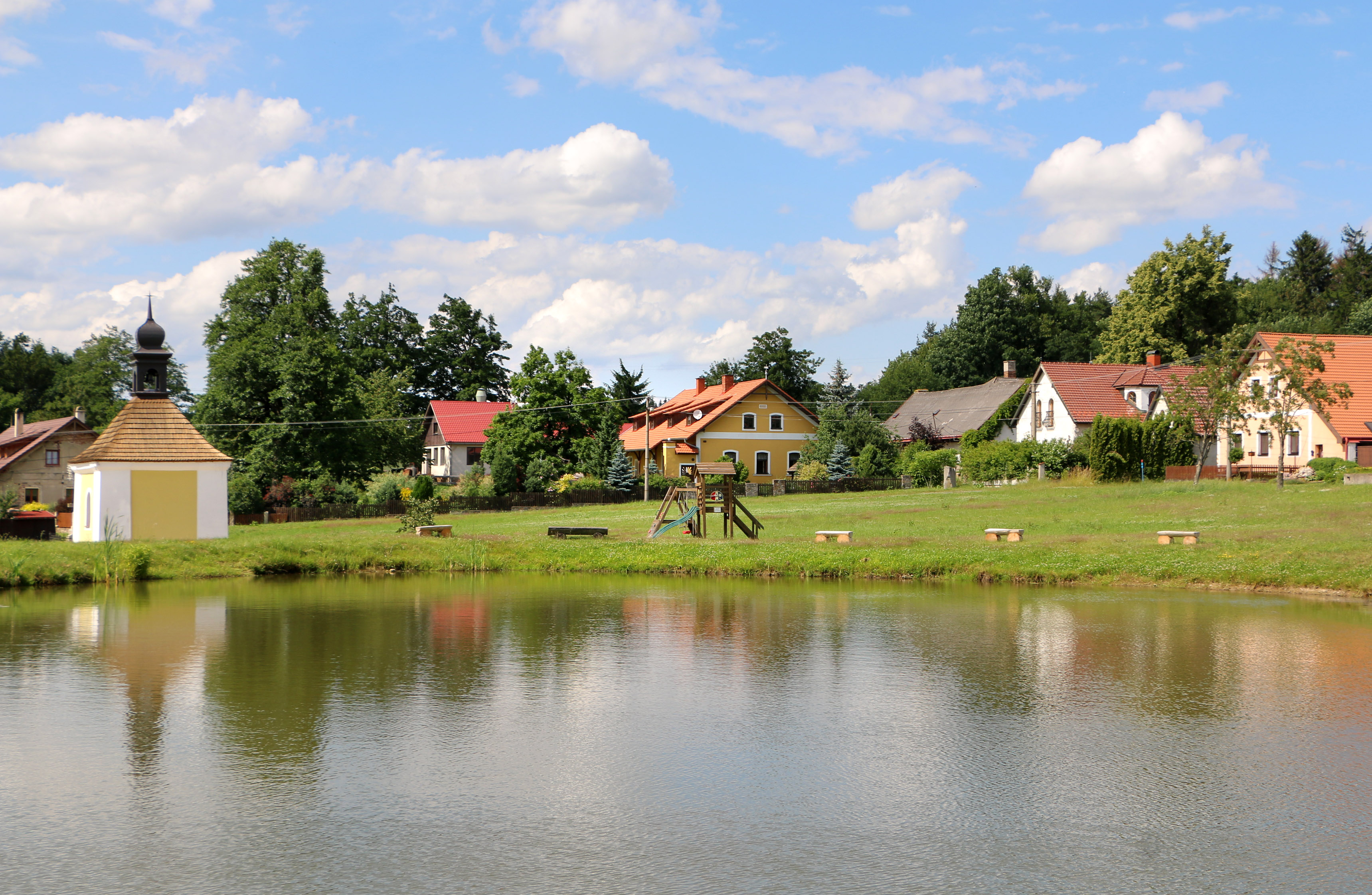
- Centre of Rosice

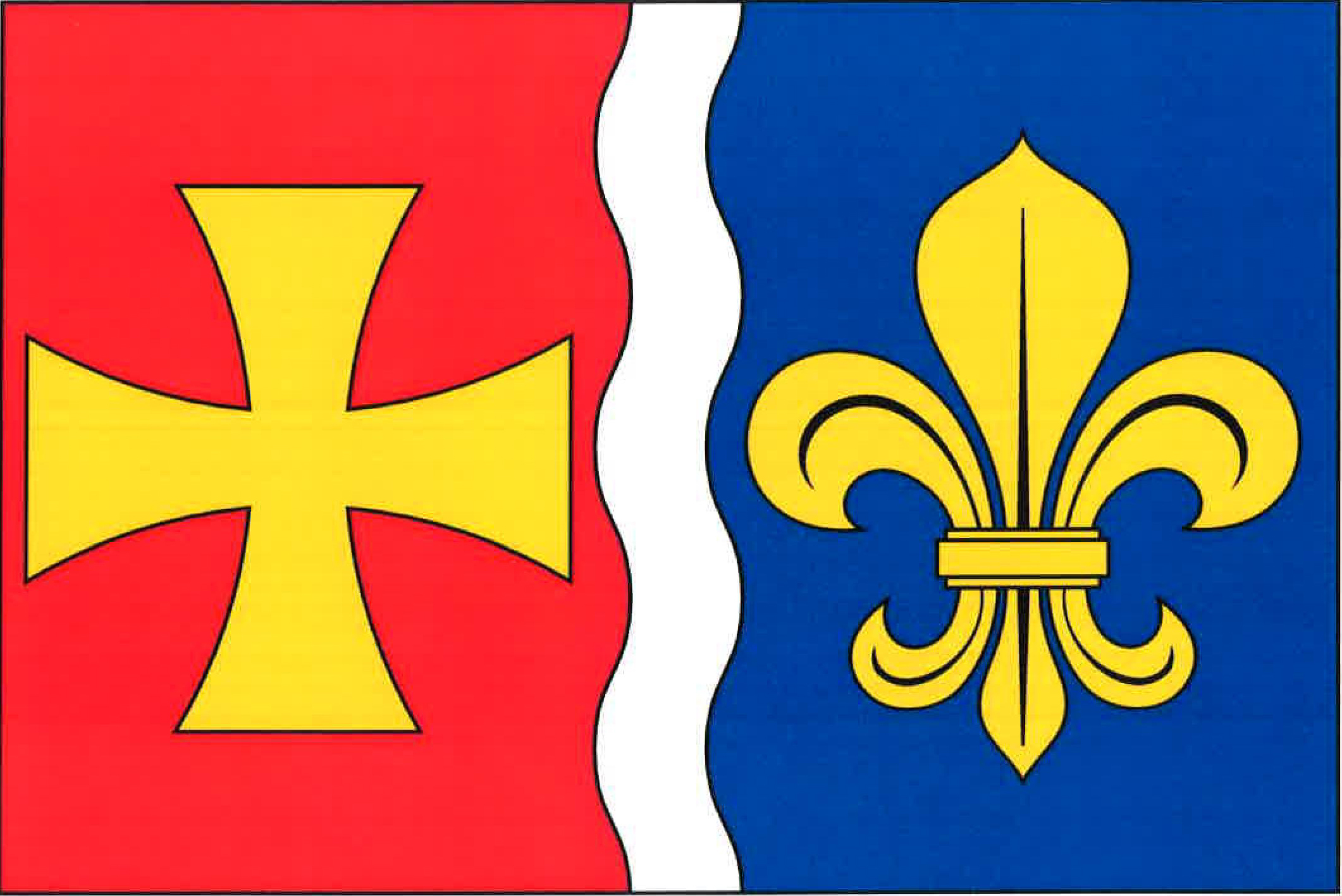
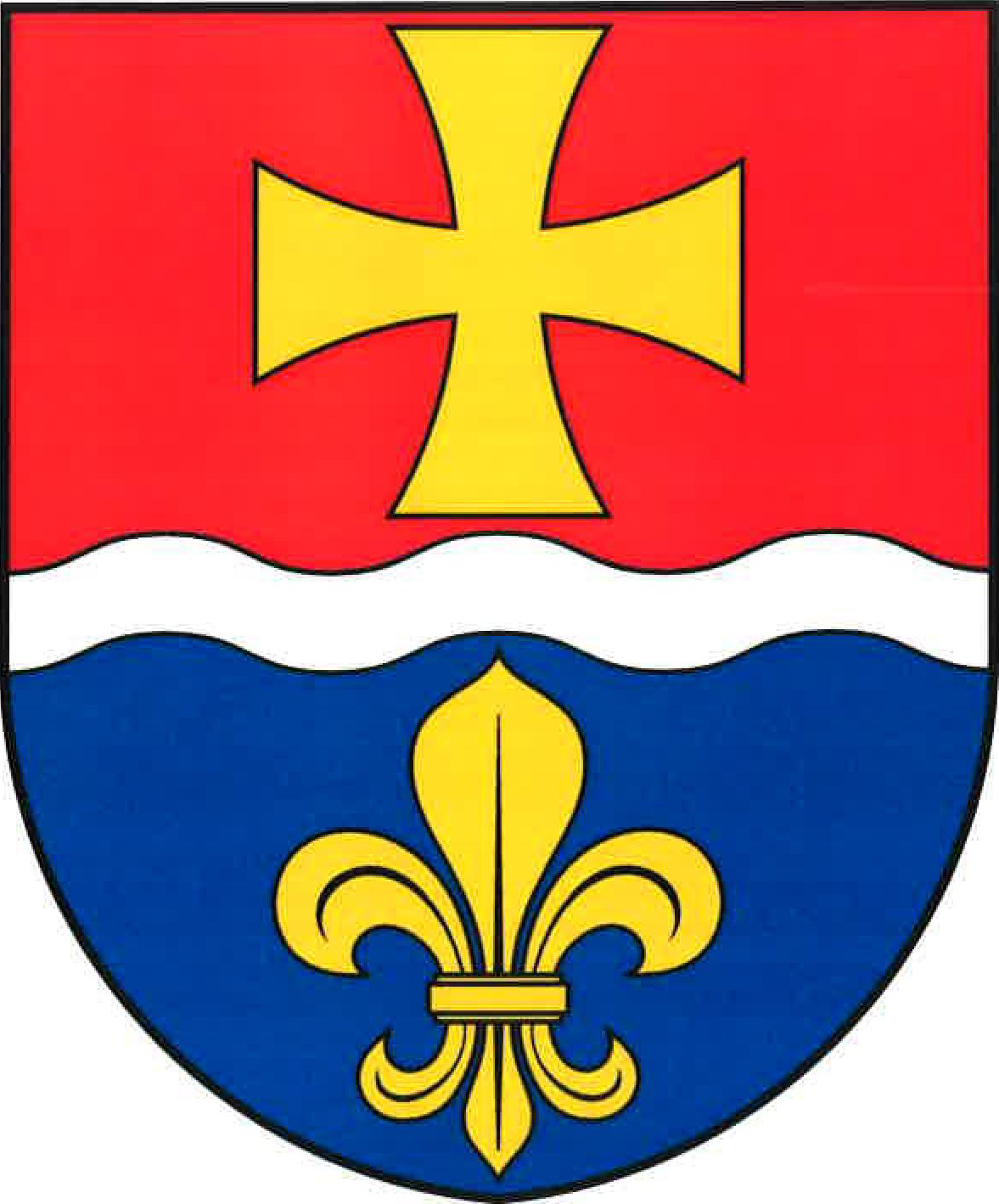
- Flag Coat of arms

- Location in the Czech Republic
- Coordinates: 49°20′4″N 15°35′14″E
- Country: Czech Republic
- Region: Vysočina
- District: Jihlava
- First mentioned: 1358

Area
  - Total: 9.01 km^{2} (3.48 sq mi)
- Elevation: 550 m (1,800 ft)

Population (2026-01-01)
  - Total: 238
  - Density: 26.4/km^{2} (68.4/sq mi)
- Time zone: UTC+1 (CET)
  - Summer (DST): UTC+2 (CEST)
- Postal code: 588 33
- Website: www.cerekvicka-rosice.eu

Cerekvička-Rosice (Czech pronunciation: [ˈtsɛrɛkvitʃka ˈrosɪtsɛ]) is a municipality in Jihlava District in the Vysočina Region of the Czech Republic. It has about 200 inhabitants.

Cerekvička-Rosice lies approximately 8 kilometres (5 mi) south of Jihlava and 120 km (75 mi) south-east of Prague.

== Administrative division ==
Cerekvička-Rosice consists of two municipal parts (in brackets population according to the 2021 census):

- Cerekvička (122)
- Rosice (74)

== Demographics ==
Historical population
Year	Pop.	±%
1869	340	—
1880	326	−4.1%
1890	346	+6.1%
1900	331	−4.3%
1910	324	−2.1%
1921	298	−8.0%
1930	305	+2.3%
1950	222	−27.2%
1961	207	−6.8%
1970	153	−26.1%
1980	123	−19.6%
1991	120	−2.4%
2001	131	+9.2%
2011	131	+0.0%
2021	196	+49.6%
Source: Censuses
