= Jean-Pierre Coursodon =

French critic and film historian

Jean-Pierre Coursodon (23 July 1935 – 31 December 2020) was a French film critic and historian. He wrote film reviews and journal articles to the magazines including Cinéma (1958–1965, 1977–1986) and Anthologie du Cinéma (1966–1969). In 1967, Coursodon began living in the United States where he contributed essays to Film Comment (1973–1975) and Cinéma d'Aujourd'hui (1975–1976). Since 1988, Coursodon served as an American correspondent for Positif magazine.

In 1970, Coursodon also co-wrote with Bertrand Tavernier an encyclopedic book 30 ans de cinéma Américain (translated as 30 Years of American Cinema). The book was updated in 1991 as 50 ans de cinéma américain to encompass two more decades. Both encyclopedia editions have yet to be translated into English. Coursodon was the co-editor (along with Pierre Sauvage) of the two-volume, English-language work American Directors (1983). Coursodon also worked as a translator, being responsible for the French editions of Michael Powell's autobiography, the memoirs of André de Toth, and biographies of Roberto Rossellini, Howard Hawks, and John Ford.

On 31 December 2020, Coursodon died in New York City, at the age of 85.

== Published works ==
- Coursodon, Jean-Pierre; Boisset, Yves (1961). 20 ans de Cinéma américain. Édition C.I.B. BnF 397798250
- Coursodon, Jean-Pierre; Tavernier, Bertrand (1970). 30 ans de Cinéma américain. Édition C.I.B.
- Coursodon, Jean-Pierre (1973). Buster Keaton. Seghers. (later re-published in 1986 in a new revised and expanded edition, Atlas / Lherminier éditeur, ISBN 273120558X)
- Coursodon, Jean-Pierre; Sauvage, Pierre (1983). American Directors: Volumes I and II. McGraw-Hill. ISBN 978-0-070-13261-0. (in English)
- Coursodon, Jean-Pierre; Tavernier, Bertrand (1995) [1991]. 50 ans de cinéma américain. Éditions Nathan. ISBN 978-2-092-41002-8.
- Coursodon, Jean-Pierre (1992). La Warner Bros. Éditions du Centre Pompidou. ISBN 978-2-858-50632-3.
