= Bill Gulick =

American novelist

- Born: Grover C. Gulick; February 22, 1916; Kansas City, Missouri, U.S.
- Died: October 25, 2013 (aged 97)
- Education: Classen School of Advanced Studies; University of Oklahoma
- Occupations: Writer; historian

Grover C. "Bill" Gulick (February 22, 1916 – October 25, 2013) was an American writer and historian from Walla Walla, Washington.

== Early life ==
Gulick was born in Kansas City, Missouri. According to his autobiography, his grandmother wanted him to be named after his father, as Grover Cleveland Gulick Jr.; but his mother resisted fiercely, and they eventually compromised with Grover C. (only) Gulick, "with my Mother saying I could choose my own middle name when I became old enough to do so." He later acquired the nickname 'Bill'.

He graduated from Classen High School in Oklahoma City, Oklahoma in 1934. The following September, he attended the University of Oklahoma.

== Career ==
Gulick had numerous short stories and 20 novels published, of which three have been made into movies. His book Snake River Country won the 1971 Pacific Northwest Booksellers Award as Best Non-fiction Book.

=== Short stories ===
- 1955 – The Road to Denver, short story published in the Saturday Evening Post
- April 4, 1942 – The Saga of Mike Shannon, short story published in Liberty Magazine

=== Books ===
- 1950 – Bend of the Snake, novel
- 1952 – A Drum Calls West, novel
- 1954 – A Thousand for the Cariboo, novel
- 1958 – The Land Beyond, novel
- 1958 – Showdown in the Sun, novel
- 1961 - Shaming of Broken Horn, novel
- 1962 – The Moon-Eyed Appaloosa, novel
- 1963 – Hallelujah Trail, novel
- 1966 – They Come to a Valley, novel
- 1969 – Liveliest Town in the West, novel
- 1971 – The Country Club Caper, novel
- 1971 – Snake River Country, non-fiction
- 1979 – Treasure in Hell's Canyon, novel
- 1981 – Chief Joseph Country: Land of the Nez Percé, non-fiction
- 1988 – Northwest Destiny: A Trilogy, Distant Trails 1805–1836; Gathering Storm 1837–1868; Lost Wallowa 1869–1879, novel
- 1990 – Roadside History of Oregon, non-fiction
- 1996 – A Traveler's History of Washington, non-fiction
- 1997 - Roll On, Columbia: To the Pacific : A Historical Novel (To the Pacific/Bill Gulick, Bk 1), historical fiction

=== Filmography ===
- Hallelujah Trail (1965), based on the novel Hallelujah Trail, aka 'John Sturges' The Hallelujah Trail
- Hotel de Paree (1960), 1 episode: "Sundance and the Greenhorn Trader"
- The Road to Denver (1955), based on a Saturday Evening Post story
- Bend of the River (1952), based on the novel Bend of the Snake
