= David Sauvage =

American activist, performance artist, and filmmaker

- Born: Los Angeles, California
- Occupations: filmmaker, performance artist
- Years active: 2011–present
- Notable work: Healing Heals the Healer Too, The Simplest Meditation in the World,
- Website: https://www.empath.nyc/

David Sauvage is an American activist, performance artist, filmmaker, and self-described empath.

== Early life and education ==
Sauvage was born in Los Angeles, California in a Jewish family. His mother worked as a lawyer and his father, Pierre Sauvage, made historical documentaries. Sauvage attended Harvard Westlake School and Columbia University, where he earned a BA, and UCLA, where he graduated with an MBA.

== Career ==
While in business school, Sauvage directed Carissa, a documentary about Carissa Phelps who overcame abandonment and prostitution as a child to attend UCLA. The film received multiple awards and was licensed to Current TV. Sauvage produced Soundcheck, a film about musician Bill Laswell. He worked as a director for commercials, including Bon Appetit. In 2011, he joined the Occupy Wall Street movement, where he sought to communicate some of the protesters' demands and raise additional funds. He co-founded Occupy.com, which served as a news aggregator about the movement's developments.

=== Life as an empath ===
In 2015, during a period of depression, Sauvage had a transformative experience with the hallucinogenic drug ayahuasca. The episode encouraged him to follow his "authentic self" and taught him that emotion was rooted in the body. Subsequently, he cultivated an ability to feel the emotions that others are experiencing. According to Sauvage, the basis for empathy is emotional self awareness, which is not cultivated in current culture.

In 2018, Sauvage presented EMPATH, a one-man show at TheatreLab, where he gave live presentations of his ability to feel others' emotions. The performance started by Sauvage explaining how he acquired the ability. Next, when reading an audience member, would begin by releasing any pre-existing emotions before physically responding to the emotions he was sensing. Sauvage says his read of the other person is instantaneous, and 75% of those he interacts with say his reading was meaningful and non-generic.

In 2019, Sauvage launched the Empath shop, a pop-up store in the East Village. Visitors received free counseling, discussion sessions, and learned about empathy.

Sauvage serves as a consultant to businesses and philanthropists who want to align their strategies with their feelings. Sauvage works with individuals and approximately 80% of his clients are female. He teaches fellow empaths through a class called School for Empaths.

Sauvage has led group meditation sessions to accompany the publication of his companion book, The Simplest Meditation in the World.
