= Samuel Pisar =

Polish-American lawyer (1929-2015)

- Samuel Pisar, 2012
- Born: March 18, 1929; Białystok, Poland
- Died: July 27, 2015 (aged 86); New York City, New York, U.S.
- Citizenship: United States
- Education: University of Melbourne; Harvard University; University of Paris
- Occupations: Lawyer, author, diplomat
- Spouses: Norma Pisar; Judith Frehm
- Children: Alexandra Pisar; Helaina Pisar; Leah Pisar
- Relatives: Antony Blinken (stepson)

Samuel Pisar (March 18, 1929 – July 27, 2015) was a Polish-American lawyer, author, and Holocaust survivor.

== Early life ==
Pisar was born in Białystok, Poland, to Jewish parents David and Helaina (née Suchowolska) Pisar. His father established the region's first taxi service.

His parents and younger sister Frieda were murdered in the Holocaust. Pisar was sent to the Majdanek, Bliżyn, Auschwitz, Sachsenhausen, Oranienburg, and Dachau death camps and ultimately to the Engelberg Tunnel near Leonberg. At the end of the war, he escaped during a death march; after making a break into the forest, he found refuge in a US tank. He is the only Holocaust survivor of the 900 children of his Polish school.

After the liberation, Pisar spent a year and a half in the American occupation zone of Germany, engaging in black marketeering with fellow survivors. He was rescued by an aunt living in Paris. An uncle sent him to Melbourne, Australia, where he resumed his studies.

He attended George Taylor and Staff School (now Taylors College) and went on to attain a Bachelor of Laws from the University of Melbourne in 1953. After recovering from a bout of tuberculosis, he traveled to the United States and earned a juris doctor from Harvard University. He also held a doctorate from the Sorbonne.

== Career ==
=== Legal career ===
In 1950, Pisar worked for the United Nations in New York and Paris. He returned to Washington in 1960 to become a member of John F. Kennedy's economic and foreign policy task force. He was also an advisor to the State Department, the Senate and House committees.

Pisar's legal clients included many Fortune 500 companies and business leaders of the 20th and 21st century. His books have been translated into many languages.

As the longtime lawyer and confidant of Robert Maxwell, Pisar was possibly the last person to speak to the man (who maintained links to the British MI6, the Soviet KGB and the Israeli Mossad) before he apparently fell to his death from his luxury yacht in November 1991.

=== Literary career ===
Pisar's memoir, Of Blood and Hope, in which he tells the story of how he survived the Holocaust, received the Present Tense literary award in 1981. He wrote a narration, based on his experiences and his anger at God, for Leonard Bernstein's Symphony No. 3 ("Kaddish"). Pisar stated that the idea came from Bernstein, who felt Pisar could bring a more authentic voice to the symphony than he could, not having gone through the Holocaust himself.

After Bernstein's death and the attacks on the World Trade Center, Pisar wrote Dialogue with God, in which he expressed his concern for the future of mankind. In June 2009, the poem was recited by Pisar at a performance of Kaddish at Yad Vashem in Jerusalem, Israel.

=== Other activities ===
Pisar co-founded Yad Vashem-France, was a Director of the Fondation pour la Mémoire de la Shoah, and a Trustee of the Brookings Institution Washington.

=== Connections to Jeffrey Epstein ===
Pisar was the lawyer and best personal friend of Ghislaine Maxwell's father Robert Maxwell and the last person to see him alive. After Maxwell's death in a yachting accident, Pisar became Jeffrey Epstein's advisor.

== Private life and honors ==
Pisar married twice. He had two daughters by his first wife, Norma Pisar, and one, Leah Pisar (who worked in the White House for Bill Clinton), from his second wife, Judith, with whom he lived in Paris and New York City. His stepson, Judith's son, Antony Blinken was appointed to President Joe Biden's cabinet as Secretary of State. His uncle-in-law was the French journalist Leo Sauvage, who had married his aunt Barbara.

Among distinctions, he was a Grand Officer of the French Legion of Honour by then President Nicolas Sarkozy in 2012 and a Commander of the Order of Merit of the Republic of Poland. In March 1995, Pisar was appointed an Honorary Officer of the Order of Australia by Queen Elizabeth, "for service to international relations and human rights".

== Death ==
Pisar died from pneumonia on July 27, 2015, in Manhattan, aged 86.
