= Rosice (Chrudim District) =

- Municipality
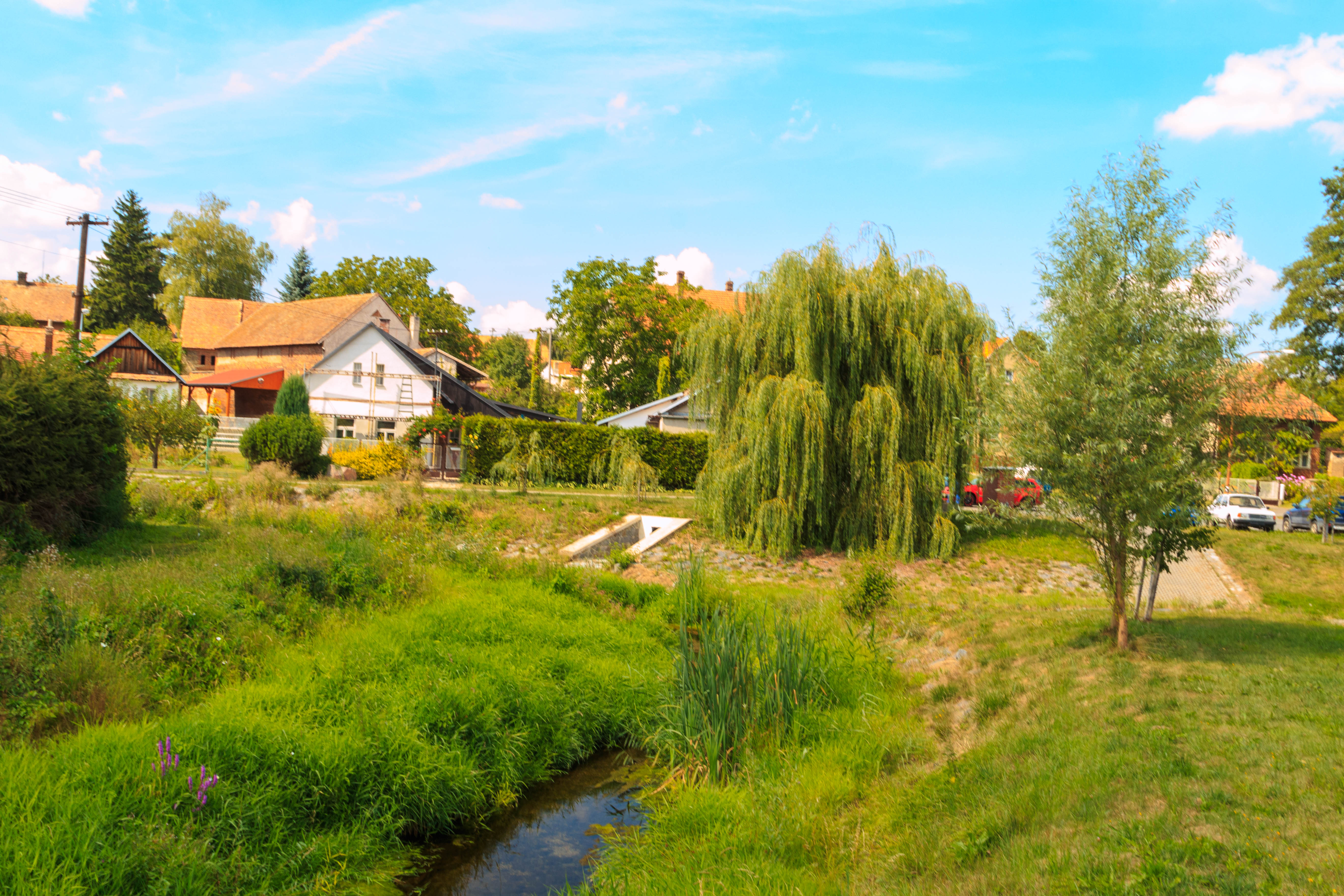
- Centre of Rosice

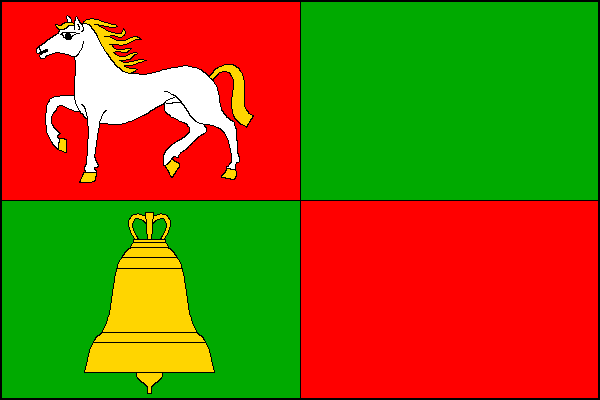
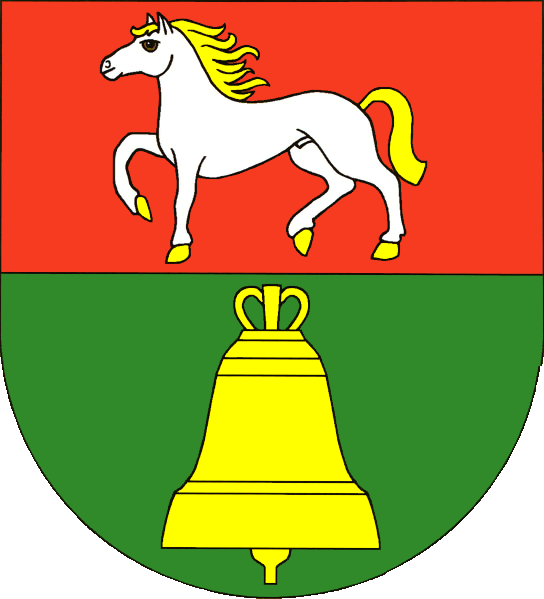
- Flag Coat of arms

- Location in the Czech Republic
- Coordinates: 49°55′20″N 15°57′5″E
- Country: Czech Republic
- Region: Pardubice
- District: Chrudim
- First mentioned: 1318

Area
  - Total: 16.10 km^{2} (6.22 sq mi)
- Elevation: 257 m (843 ft)

Population (2026-01-01)
  - Total: 1,372
  - Density: 85.22/km^{2} (220.7/sq mi)
- Time zone: UTC+1 (CET)
  - Summer (DST): UTC+2 (CEST)
- Postal code: 538 34
- Website: www.obec-rosice.cz

Rosice is a municipality and village in Chrudim District in the Pardubice Region of the Czech Republic. It has about 1,400 inhabitants.

== Administrative division ==
Rosice consists of four municipal parts (in brackets population according to the 2021 census):

- Rosice (955)
- Bor u Chroustovic (117)
- Brčekoly (117)
- Synčany (135)

== Etymology ==
The name Rosice is derived from the personal name Rosa, meaning "the village of Rosa's people".

== Geography ==
Chroustovice is located about 11 kilometres (7 mi) east of Chrudim and 17 km (11 mi) southeast of Pardubice. It lies in an undulating agricultural landscape in the Svitavy Uplands. The Žejbro Stream flows through the municipality.

== History ==
There were originally two separate villages in the area of today's Rosice, called Rosice and Seslávky. The first written mention of Seslávky is from after 1131 and the first written mention of Rosice is from 1318.

== Demographics ==
Historical population

Year	Pop.	±%
1869	1,782	—
1880	1,990	+11.7%
1890	2,146	+7.8%
1900	2,107	−1.8%
1910	2,109	+0.1%

Year	Pop.	±%
1921	2,038	−3.4%
1930	1,923	−5.6%
1950	1,480	−23.0%
1961	1,462	−1.2%
1970	1,346	−7.9%

Year	Pop.	±%
1980	1,380	+2.5%
1991	1,272	−7.8%
2001	1,292	+1.6%
2011	1,323	+2.4%
2021	1,324	+0.1%

Source: Censuses

== Transport ==
There are no railways or major roads passing through the municipality.

== Sights ==
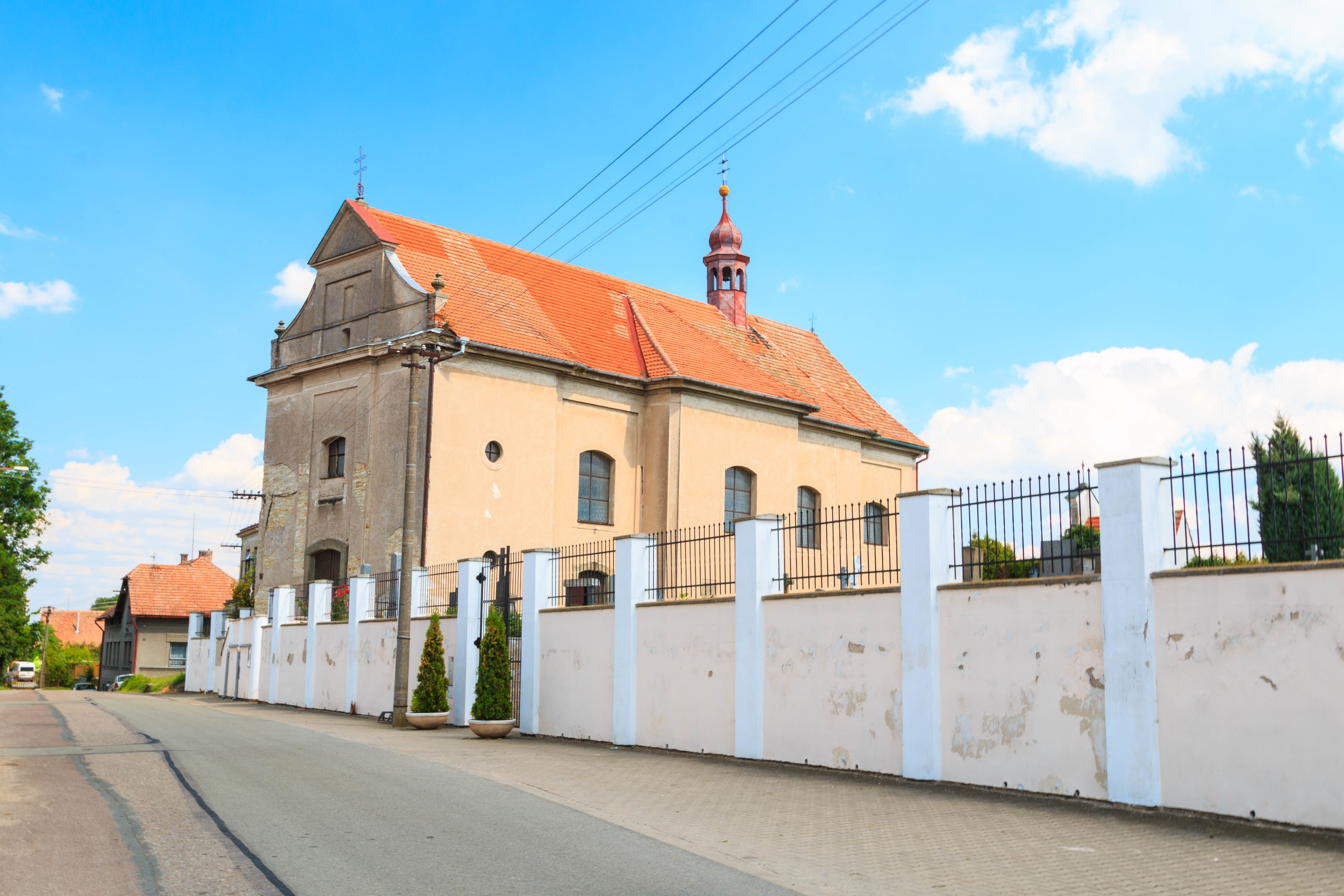
Church of Saint Wenceslaus

The main landmark of Rosice is the Church of Saint Wenceslaus. It was built in the Baroque style in the 18th century.
