= Pheasant under glass =

Poultry dish

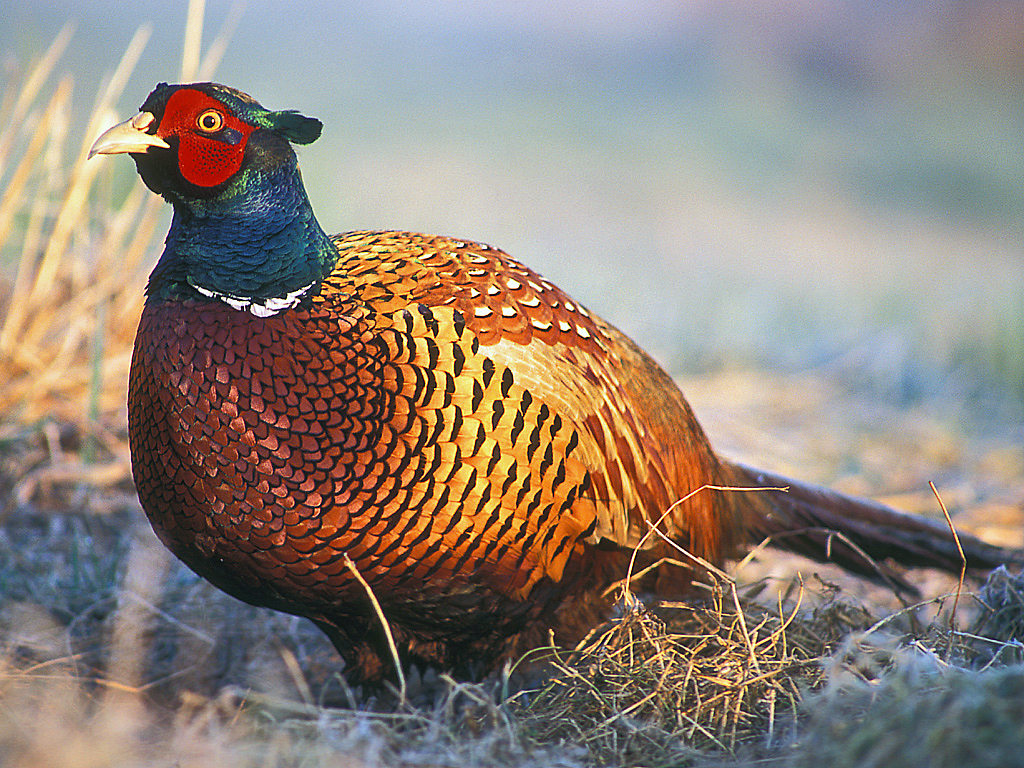
Male common pheasant

Pheasant under glass (faison sous cloche) is a poultry dish generally consisting of the breast of pheasant with shallots in a reduced wine sauce, although recipes will vary. While the dish has waned in popularity over many decades, it remains a cultural icon for many in westernized countries. Pheasant under glass is traditionally served on a plate that is covered with a glass dome.

Pheasant body weight can range from 0.5 to 3 kg (1.1 to 6.6 lb), with males averaging 1.2 kg (2.6 lb) and females averaging 0.9 kg (2.0 lb)., although only the breast is used for this dish.

== In culture ==
Pheasant under glass is considered haute cuisine, and a luxury, although consumption of pheasant in general is less common than at the beginning of the 20th century. In literature, consumption of the dish is often used as a vehicle noting the wealth or extravagance of the character, or as one author described it "the hoitiest of toity cuisine".

A recipe for Faison Sous Cloche (Breast of Pheasant Under Glass) appears in Mary and Vincent Price's 1965 Treasury of Great Recipes. According to the Treasury, the recipe dates to the 1940s by Roy Alciatore of the famous Antoine's Restaurant in New Orleans, and the pheasant is served under glass to keep it "hot and appetizingly visible."

In the book International Business, culture is described thus:

In everyday usage, the term "culture" refers to the finer things in life, such as the fine arts, literature, and philosophy. Under this very narrow definition of culture, the "cultured person" is one who prefers Handel to hard rock; can distinguish between the artistic styles of Monet and Manet; prefers pheasant under glass to grits and red-eye gravy, and 12-year-old Chivas Regal to Budweiser; and spends his/her time reading Aristotle or Marx rather than watching wrestling on television.

The apparent extravagance of the dish is similar to that of caviar, and similar to but less controversial than pâté or ortolan.

== See also ==
- Pheasant paste – a type of pâté made from pheasant meat and other common pâté ingredients
