= Victoria Price =

American public speaker and author (born 1962)

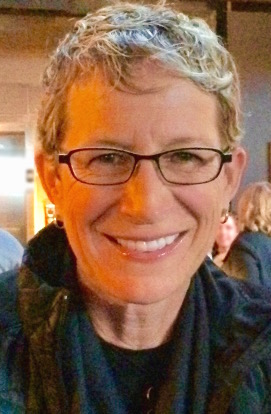
- Born: Mary Victoria Price; April 27, 1962 (age 64); Santa Monica, California, U.S.
- Education: Williams College
- Occupations: Writer; public speaker
- Parents: Vincent Price; Mary Grant
- Relatives: V. B. Price (half-brother)
- Website: www.victoriaprice.com

Mary Victoria Price (born April 27, 1962) is an American public speaker and the author of the memoir, The Way of Being Lost: A Road Trip to My Truest Self and Vincent Price: A Daughter's Biography. She currently spends much of her time traveling and speaking about the life of her father, Vincent Price, as well as discussing self-development topics.

== Early life ==
Price was born April 27, 1962, at St John's Hospital in Santa Monica, California, to actor Vincent Price and his second wife, Mary Grant Price. She has one older half-sibling, Vincent Barrett Price, born in 1940 to Vincent Price's first wife Edith Barrett. Victoria Price has a bachelor's degree in art history and theater from Williams College.

== Career ==
Price has taught at the University of New Mexico, the New Mexico Highlands University, and the Philos School, an alternative arts-and-humanities school in Santa Fe.

She has worked as an interior designer, and has appeared on HGTV and in many design publications. She is also an interfaith/interspiritual minister, having been ordained in 2016. She is an inspirational speaker, giving talks internationally on creativity, spirituality, wellness, art and design, as well as on the life of her father and other topics. She was on the board of the Vincent Price Art Museum in California.

She also appeared in the movie Edward Scissorhands, her father's last feature film, where she played a newscaster.

== Selected publications ==
Victoria Price with a photo of her father, Vincent Price, superimposed in a nearby position at the British Museum in London.

Price is the author of the inspirational memoir, The Way of Being Lost: A Road Trip to My Truest Self (Ixia Press/Dover, 2018) and Living Love: 12 Heart-Centered Practices to Transform Your Life (ixia Press/Dover, 2020).

In 1999, Price wrote Vincent Price: A Daughter's Biography, and released an updated version with changed acknowledgements in 2014 and 2019.

She has also written the preface for a 50th anniversary edition of A Treasury of Great Recipes, a cookbook written by Vincent Price and his wife Mary.

== Personal life ==
Price has been a nomad since 2016. She has her own blog, Daily Practice of Joy.

Although Victoria is the daughter of a horror icon, she is not a fan of horror films, but she is a fan of horror film fans. She often attends and speaks at horror conventions.

== Vincent Price Award ==
In 2014 Hollywood Horrorfest founder Miles Flanagan and Victoria created the Vincent Price Award. Also known as simply the Price Award, it “celebrates Vincent Price’s unique artistic and iconic legacy by honoring an artist whose work has achieved equally iconic status in the horror/fantasy genres.” The award is presented each year as part of Hollywood Horrorfest, with all profits from the event going to charity. The event fundraised for the Vincent Price Art Museum and in 2025 set up the Vincent Price Scholarship to directly fundraise for individual students at East Los Angeles College, “the spiritual home of Vincent Price.”

Previous recipients include Joe Dante, Cassandra Peterson, Sid Haig, John Landis and Rick Baker.
