= Strangers in the Night (film) =

1944 film by Anthony Mann

- Theatrical release poster
- Directed by: Anthony Mann
- Screenplay by: Bryant Ford; Paul Gangelin
- Story by: Philip MacDonald
- Produced by: Rudolph E. Abel
- Starring: William Terry; Virginia Grey
- Cinematography: Reggie Lanning
- Edited by: Arthur Roberts
- Music by: Morton Scott
- Production company: Republic Pictures
- Distributed by: Republic Pictures
- Release date: September 12, 1944 (United States)
- Running time: 56 minutes
- Country: United States
- Language: English

Strangers in the Night is a 1944 American film noir mystery film starring William Terry, Virginia Grey, with Helene Thimig and Edith Barrett in support. It was directed by Anthony Mann, with a screenplay by Bryant Ford and Paul Gangelin.

== Plot ==
Sgt. Johnny Meadows is wounded in battle in the South Pacific during World War Two. While recuperating, he reads a book donated to the Red Cross by Rosemary Blake, who has written her name and address inside. He corresponds with her, and as pen pals they fall in love. Back in the States after being discharged, Johnny boards a train headed to the town in which Rosemary lives and meets Dr. Leslie Ross, a woman reading the same book. Leslie is going to the same town, where she is taking over another doctor's practice. Unbeknownst to Johnny, she already met Rosemary's mother.

Johnny and Leslie spend time together and, just as he begins asking her if she knows Rosemary, train cars ahead of them derail. Johnny assists the doctor as she cares for the injured. Afterwards, they share a cab into town.

The next day, as the doctor settles into her practice, Johnny drives up the high hill to Rosemary's house. He meets the old and disabled homeowner, Rosemary's mother, and her assistant, Ivy Miller. Mrs. Blake and Miller say that Rosemary is away, but will return soon, and Mrs. Blake invites him to stay. The next day, Mrs. Blake shows Johnny a portrait of Rosemary. From the style in which the painting is done, Johnny believes he knows the artist but cannot remember his name.

After days of Rosemary not showing up, and no satisfactory answers forthcoming from either Mrs. Blake or Miller, who seems nervous about the situation, Johnny leaves for San Francisco. He recalled the artist's name and that he had worked with him in the city before the war. Meanwhile, Miller attempts to divulge to Dr. Ross what is happening, but her nervousness stops her. Dr. Ross and her nurse suspect something unusual is happening in the mansion, but because Mrs. Blake was dismissive of the doctor during an initial consultation on her first day in town, they take no action.

After discovering what Miller tried to do, Mrs. Blake gives her an overdose of medicine to kill her. Moments later, Dr. Ross shows up at the home to see how Miller is doing, and then Johnny appears too. He found out that the painting is a ‘fantasy’ of what Mrs. Blake pictured as a perfect daughter. She admits to the ruse, explaining that she could not have children but always wanted a daughter so she could be loved. She wrote the letters to Johnny. She asks for forgiveness and the couple announce that they will get married. Mrs. Blake suggests they share a celebratory drink. Johnny insists Miller should join them and runs upstairs to get her. He finds her unconscious; Dr. Ross can do nothing to revive her.

Mrs. Blake accuses the doctor of malpractice, but Ross responds that the medicine she had prescribed for Miller was not sufficient to kill her. Dr. Ross suggests Miller was murdered, but Mrs. Blake says it was suicide, that Miller has left a note. Johnny and Dr. Ross ask to see it, and Mrs. Blake leaves them to fetch it. She instead goes to their car to set a booby-trap. She returns without the note, and sends them away. They leave, and Johnny is almost killed tripping over the rope that Mrs. Blake tied to their car as part of her trap. Dr. Ross realizes what happened, and they feign their deaths by screaming. Hearing this, Mrs. Blake telephones for an ambulance, but then Johnny and Dr. Ross walk into the room. Mrs. Blake turns to the portrait and cries out to it for help. The portrait, however, falls off the wall and kills her.

== Cast ==
- William Terry as Sgt. Johnny Meadows
- Virginia Grey as Dr. Leslie Ross
- Helene Thimig as Mrs. Hilda Blake
- Edith Barrett as Ivy Miller
- Anne O'Neal as Nurse Thompson
- Audley Anderson as Train Conductor
- Charles Sullivan as Police Driver
- Frances Morris as Nurse
- George Sherwood as Navy Doctor

== Reception ==
=== Critical response ===
Film historian Spencer Selby called the film an "Eerie low-budget melodrama evincing several early noir elements of plot and style."

When the Blu-ray edition was released, film historian and critic Glenn Erickson discussed the background of the team that produced the film, "It's [Anthony Mann's] fifth film feature and his first that can be classified as at least partially noir. Compared to Joseph H. Lewis's My Name Is Julia Ross (a mini-masterpiece) or William Castle's When Strangers Marry (strained but quirky), 1944's Strangers in the Night is nobody's idea of great filmmaking. But in Olive Films' flawless Blu-ray edition, it's an excellent candidate for study ... Strangers in the Night's story credit points to Philip MacDonald, a screenwriter on the classic mysteries Rebecca, The Dark Past and Val Lewton's The Body Snatcher. The co-screenwriter Paul Gangelin has impressive credits as well, and contributes some natural-sounding dialogue."
