= Shan Wells =

American artist

- Born: Shan Wells; May 31, 1967 (age 59); Colorado, United States
- Education: Art Center College of Design, University of Canterbury, New Zealand
- Occupations: Political cartoonist, Sculptor, blogger
- Years active: 1992 – present
- Notable credit(s): The Huffington Post, Artizans
- Title: Master of Fine Arts
- Website: http://www.shanwells.com/

Shan Wells is a North American sculptor, filmmaker and illustrator. He attended Art Center College of Design in California and the University of Canterbury in New Zealand, where he studied under Andrew Drummond and completed a Master of Fine Arts in 1998.

Wells illustrated a weekly political cartoon for the Durango Telegraph, an independent weekly newspaper in Durango, Colorado, from 2002 to 2021. Wells retired from political illustration after 19 years citing the need for white men to "shut up and listen," and the lack of input from "underrepresented voices" in U.S. political discourse. Wells also blogged as a cartoonist for the Huffington Post from 2009 to 2016.

Wells is the videographer for Fort Lewis College.

== Awards and grants ==
- 2003 Colorado Council on the Arts Fellowship- Sculpture
- 2002 Fort Collins Museum of Contemporary Art Biennial Award
- 2000 Colorado Council on the Arts Fellowship-Drawing
- 1999 Pollock Krasner Foundation Grant

== Important works ==
Image	Dates	Title	Location
	2001–2002	calendar	Berg Park, Farmington, New Mexico
	2004–2005	moments project	Durango, Colorado

== Political cartoons ==
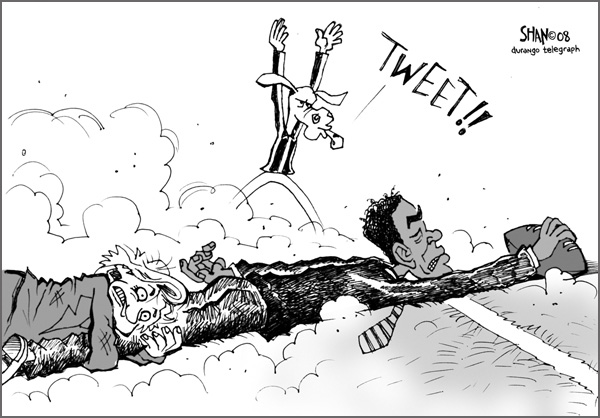

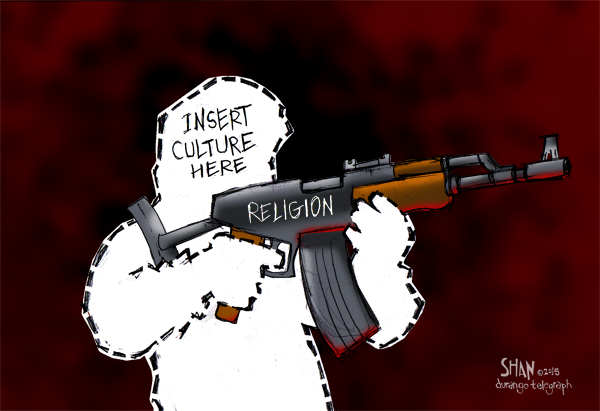
2015 cartoon referring to the prevalence of religious-sponsored terrorism
