= Jane Eyre (1943 film) =

Film by Robert Stevenson

- Theatrical release poster
- Directed by: Robert Stevenson
- Screenplay by: John Houseman; Aldous Huxley; Robert Stevenson
- Based on: Jane Eyre; 1847 novel by Charlotte Brontë
- Produced by: No credit in film
- Starring: Orson Welles; Joan Fontaine
- Cinematography: George Barnes
- Edited by: Walter Thompson
- Music by: Bernard Herrmann
- Production company: 20th Century Fox
- Distributed by: 20th Century Fox
- Release dates: December 24, 1943 (UK); February 4, 1944 (US)
- Running time: 97 minutes
- Country: United States
- Language: English
- Budget: $1,705,000
- Box office: $1,750,000 (rentals); 2,620,527 admissions (France, 1946)

Jane Eyre is a 1943 American romantic-drama film adaptation of Charlotte Brontë's 1847 novel of the same name, released by 20th Century Fox. It was directed by Robert Stevenson and produced by the uncredited Kenneth Macgowan and Orson Welles; Welles also stars in the film as Edward Rochester, with Joan Fontaine playing the titular character.

The screenplay was written by John Houseman, Aldous Huxley, and director Robert Stevenson. The musical score was composed and conducted by Bernard Herrmann, and the cinematography was by George Barnes.

== Plot ==
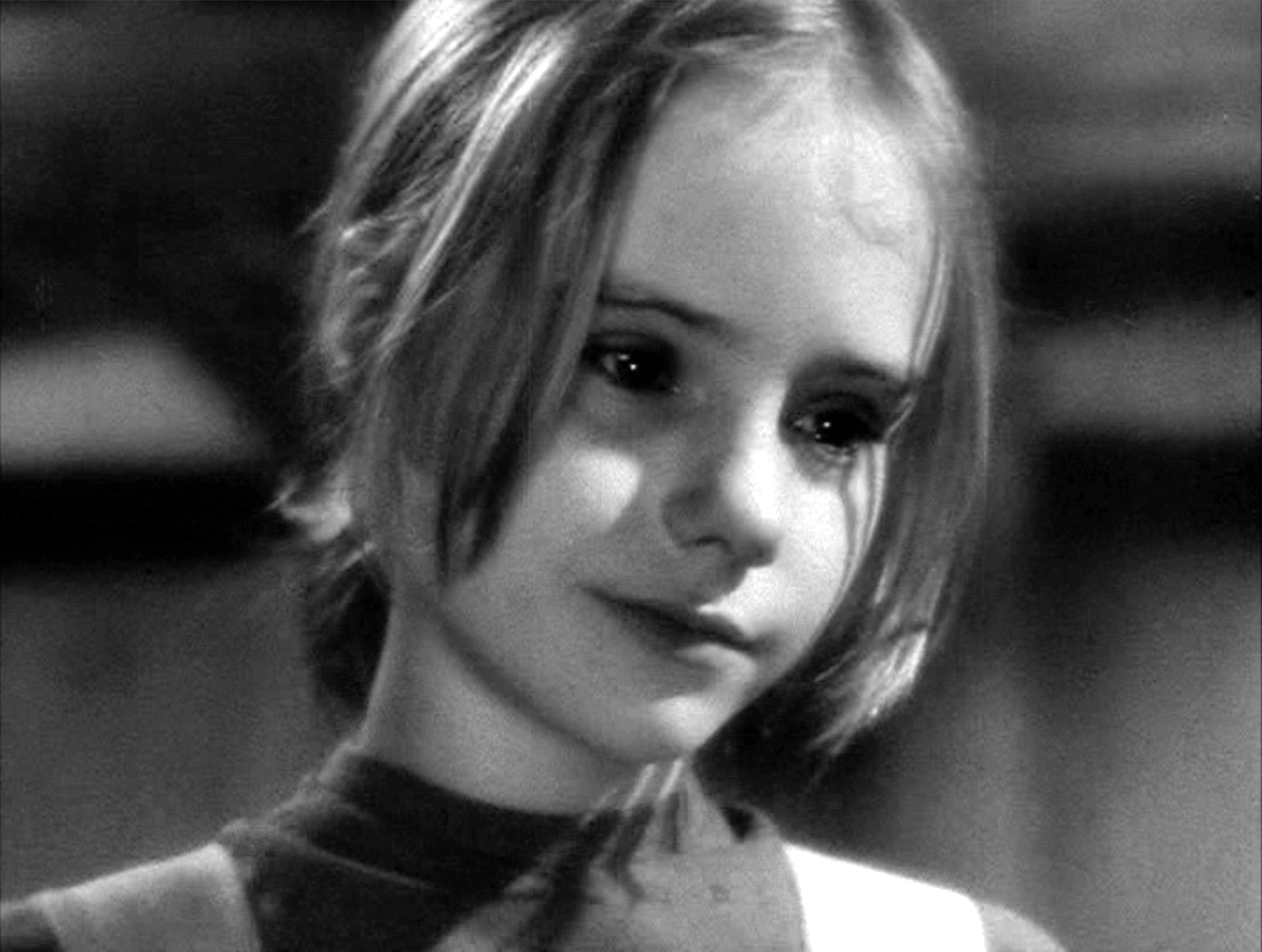
Peggy Ann Garner as young Jane

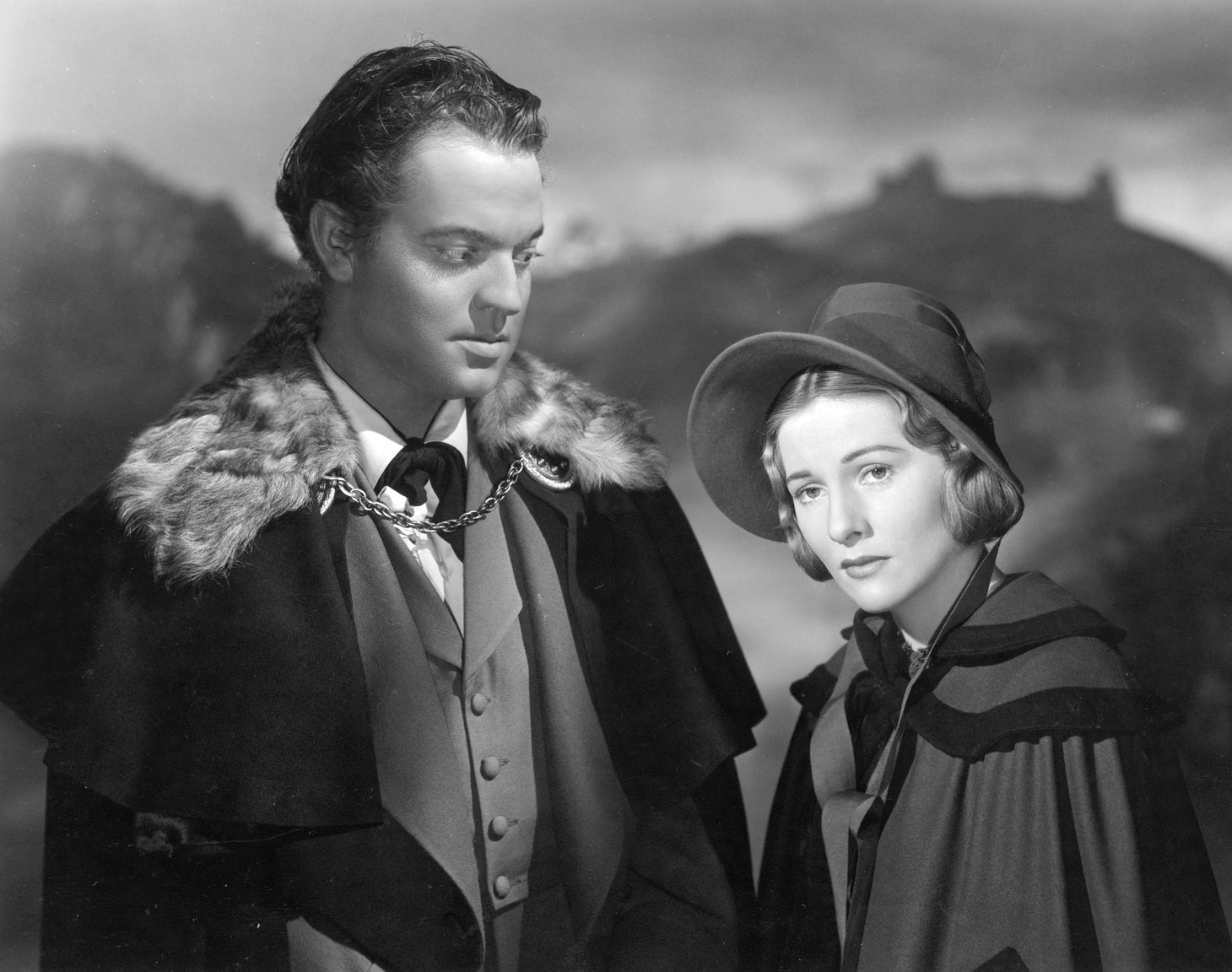
Orson Welles and Joan Fontaine

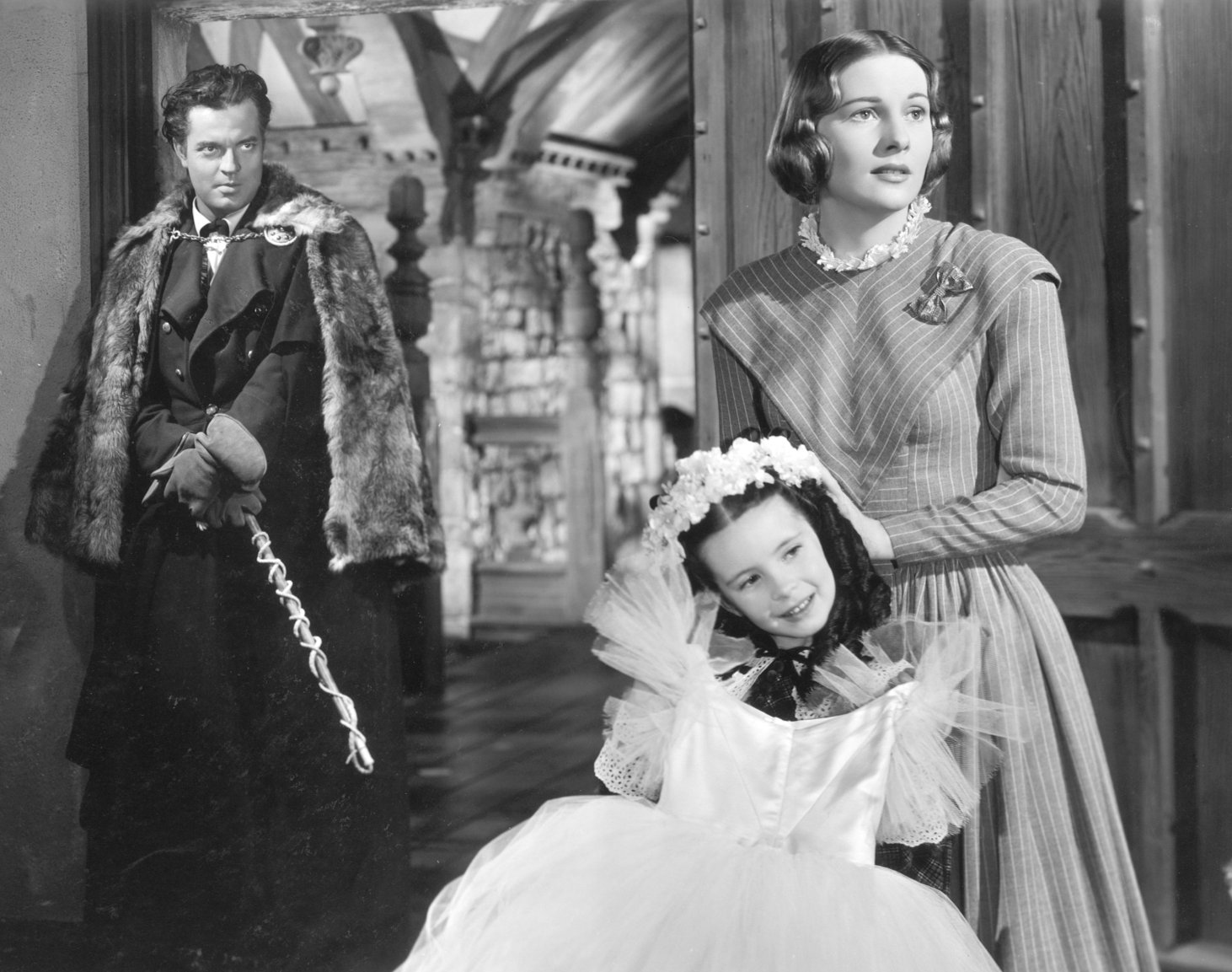
Welles, Margaret O'Brien and Fontaine

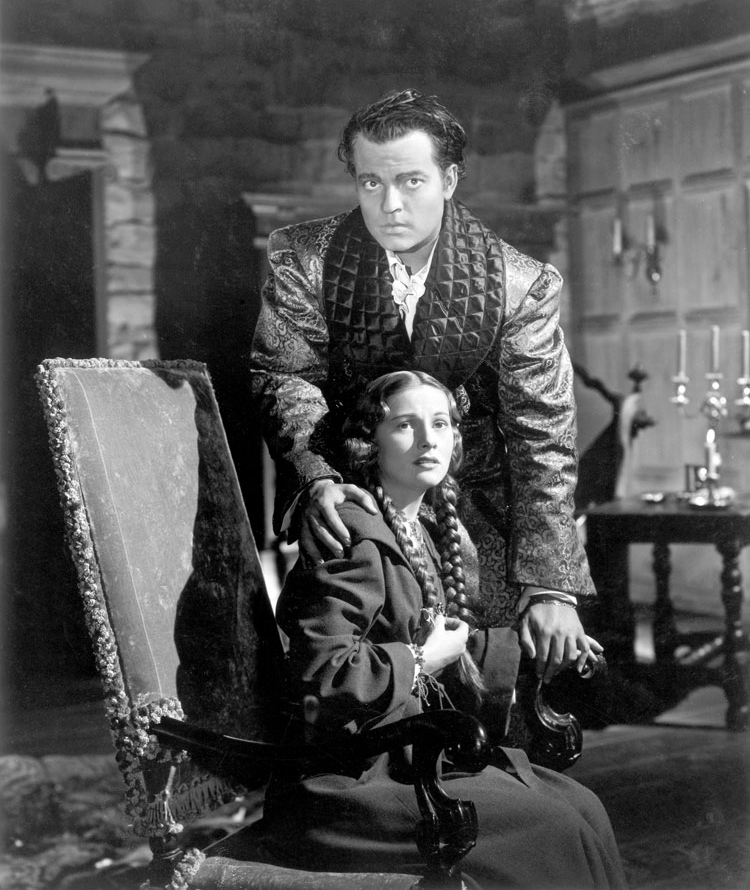
Welles and Fontaine

Orphaned, unloved, and unwanted ten-year-old Jane Eyre lives with her cruel, selfish, uncaring maternal aunt via marriage, Mrs. Reed of Gateshead Hall, and her spoiled, bullying son. Jane is ecstatic when Mrs. Reed, eager to be rid of her, arranges for Jane to be sent to Lowood Institution, a charity boarding school for young girls, run by the disciplinarian Mr. Brocklehurst.

Based on what Mrs. Reed has told him, Mr. Brocklehurst labels Jane a liar in front of her schoolmates and orders her to stand on a stool for hours on her first day of attendance. She is comforted and befriended by another student, Helen Burns. Later, Jane protests when Brocklehurst orders that Helen's naturally curling hair be cut. Both are punished by being forced to walk circles in a courtyard during a downpour. Dr. Rivers, a sympathetic physician who periodically checks on the students, brings the girls inside, but it is too late for Helen, who dies that night.

Ten years later, in 1840, twenty-year-old Jane turns down Brocklehurst's offer of a teaching position. She advertises for and accepts a job as governess for a young girl named Adèle. When Jane arrives at Thornfield, a gloomy, isolated mansion, she initially thinks her employer is Mrs. Fairfax, who is in fact the housekeeper for the absent master.

Jane goes for a walk one night only to startle a horse into throwing and slightly injuring its rider, Edward Rochester — who she doesn't realize is her employer. When Jane arrives back at Thornfield, she discovers this fact, and Rochester calls her into his library to interview her. His brusque manner contrasts with her quiet, gentle demeanor, and he finally dismisses her with the wish that she will enjoy her stay there.

That night, Jane is awakened by strange laughter. She investigates, and discovers that Rochester's bed curtains are on fire. She rouses the sleeping man and they extinguish the fire without rousing anyone. Rochester bids her wait while he goes to another wing of the house, where mysterious seamstress Grace Poole keeps to herself. When he returns, he tells Jane nothing other than that the matter is under control. After realizing that Adele may have been harmed, as well, Rochester and Jane rush to check on her. They find her asleep in her bed, safe, and Rochester confides that Adele may be his daughter, rather than simply his ward. The next morning, he leaves Thornfield.

A winter and spring go by before he returns with a large group of guests. Jane is greatly saddened when Mrs. Fairfax discloses that everyone expects Rochester to marry the vivacious and snobbish Blanche Ingram. However, Rochester confides to Jane his conviction that Blanche is attracted only by his wealth.

When a man named Richard Mason of Spanish Town, Jamaica, arrives at Thornfield, Jane sees that Rochester is disturbed. That night, a pained scream awakens everyone. Rochester assures his guests it is just a servant's reaction to a nightmare, but after he sends them back to their rooms, he has Jane secretly tend to a bleeding Mason in the tower while he fetches a doctor. Behind her, a locked wooden door rattles with someone trying to get out, but Rochester orders Jane to ignore everything she sees or hears. Rochester has the doctor take Mason away.

Rochester has a private conversation with Blanche, in which he bluntly asserts that she is a gold digger. Offended, she and the other guests leave. Unaware of this development, Jane broaches the topic of her future employment elsewhere after Rochester gets married, and confesses that she does not want to leave Rochester. In response, Rochester reveals that he loves her and not Blanche, and proposes marriage to her, which she accepts.

During the wedding ceremony, an attorney intervenes and declares that Rochester has a wife by the name of Bertha Antonietta Mason, who is mentally ill and deranged. This is confirmed by Mason, Rochester's brother-in-law. Rochester calls off the marriage ceremony and takes Jane and Mason back to Thornfield to reveal Bertha, who is insane to the point of animalistic behavior, and lives in a tower cell guarded by Grace Poole. Rochester explains to Jane that his and Bertha's marriage was arranged when he was a teenager, and he did not truly know her. He was helpless as she drove herself mad, and has been searching for happiness with a real partner ever since, which caused him to become desperate when he fell for Jane. Though they admit they still love each other, Jane rejects Rochester's offer to stay as his mistress, and she determinedly departs Thornfield to preserve her principles.

With her funds exhausted, Jane returns to Gateshead. She discovers that her aunt has suffered a stroke, caused by worry over the ruinous gambling habits of her son, who it is revealed has committed suicide. Mrs. Reed is happy to see Jane and they reconcile. After Mrs. Reed dies, Jane ponders what to do next, even considering working for Mr. Brocklehurst, when she hears Rochester's anguished voice calling her name during a storm.

Jane returns to Thornfield and finds it in ruins. Mrs. Fairfax informs her that Bertha had escaped confinement, set the place on fire, and fled to the roof. While Fairfax took Adèle to safety, Rochester tried to rescue Bertha, but she jumped to her death. The burning staircase collapsed underneath Rochester, badly wounding him. With no other impediments, Jane reunites with Rochester, who is now blind from the fire. He tells her she should not waste her life with a crippled man like him, but she has made her choice to stay. They reaffirm their love and kiss passionately. Jane narrates that she married Rochester, and when their son was born, her husband's vision was sufficiently restored for him to see their child.

== Cast ==
- Orson Welles as Edward Rochester
- Joan Fontaine as Jane Eyre
- Margaret O'Brien as Adèle Verans
- Peggy Ann Garner as young Jane Eyre
- John Sutton as Dr. Rivers
- Sara Allgood as Bessie
- Henry Daniell as Mr. Brocklehurst
- Agnes Moorehead as Mrs. Reed
- Aubrey Mather as Colonel Percy Dent
- Edith Barrett as Mrs. Fairfax
- Barbara Everest as Lady Ingram
- Hillary Brooke as Blanche Ingram
- Ethel Griffies as Grace Poole
- Eily Malyon as Mrs. Skatcher
- Ivan Simpson as Mr. Woods
- Erskine Sanford as Mr. Briggs
- John Abbott as Mason
- Elizabeth Taylor as Helen Burns
- Mae Marsh as Leah
- Mary Forbes as Mrs. Eshton
- Thomas Louden as Sir George Lynn
- Yorke Sherwood as Beadle
- Ronald Harris as John Reed
- Charles Irwin as Auctioneer
- Gwendolyn Logan as Dowager
- Moyna Macgill as Dowager
- Gerald Oliver Smith as Footman at Gateshead
- Leslie Vincent as Guest
- Billie Seward as Woman at party
- Adele Jergens as Woman at party
- Eustace Wyatt as Dr. Carter
- Harry Allen as Guard
- Charles Coleman as Guard
- Billy Bevan as Bookie
- Tempe Pigott as Fortune teller/Gypsy
- Alec Craig as Footman
- Arthur Gould-Porter as Young Man
- Brandon Hurst as Trustee
- Betta St John as Orphan girl

== Production ==
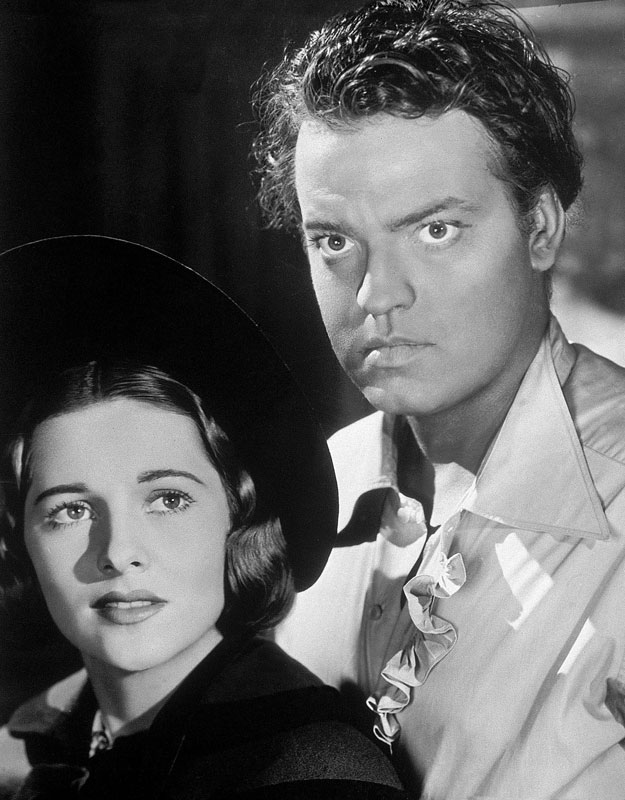
Joan Fontaine and Orson Welles

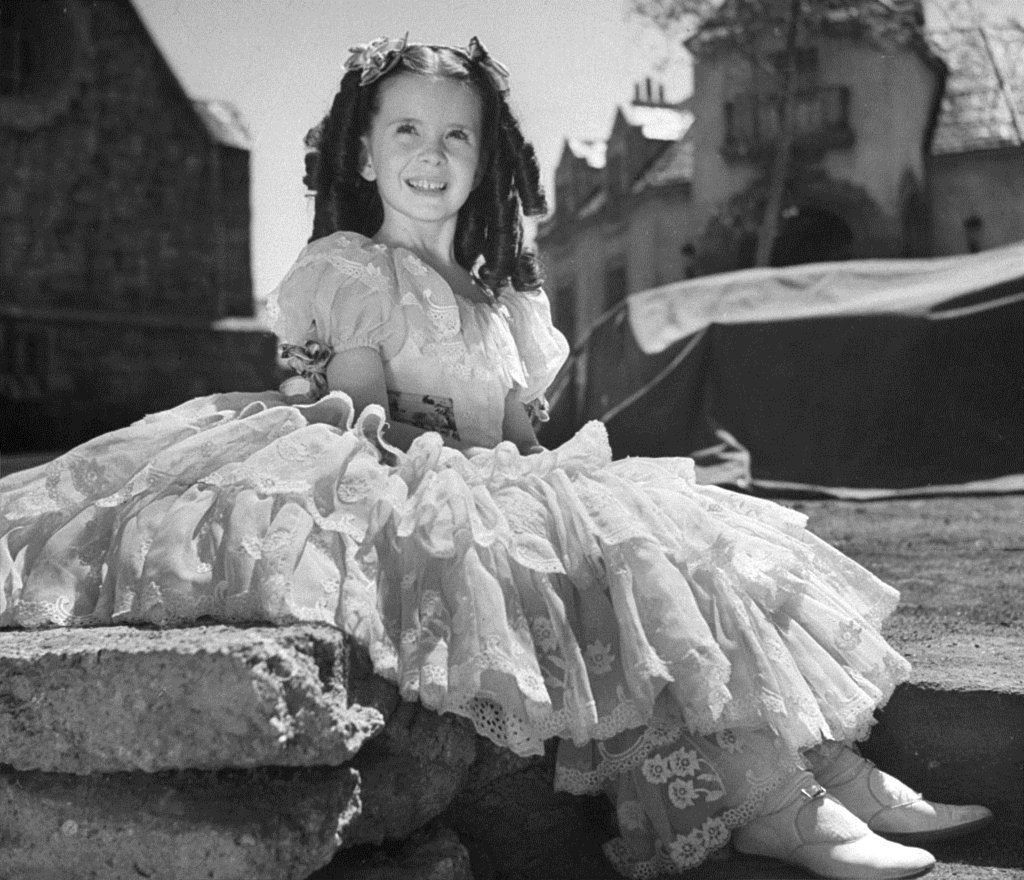
Margaret O'Brien

=== Development under David O. Selznick ===
David O. Selznick hired John Houseman in February 1941 while Houseman was directing Philip Barry's play Liberty Bell. Houseman's first assignment for the producer would be writing the script to Jane Eyre.

Houseman later said "I foolishly believed I would then produce the film because Selznick had just made Gone with the Wind and Rebecca and I believed he was going to take a rest from producing for a while and let me do the producing for his studio. This was one of the reasons I went to work for him. But I didn't know David Selznick! It was absolutely out of the question that he would dream of letting anybody else do anything."

Houseman says he started work on the screenplay during rehearsals for the Mercury Theatre's Broadway production of Native Son. Robert Stevenson, a British director Selznick had under contract, was sent to New York City to work with him.

After the play's March 24 premiere, Houseman and Stevenson flew to the West Coast and completed the screenplay over the next five weeks. According to Houseman, Stevenson did most of the work. "We finished it and presented it to our leader, only to discover that he had not the slightest intention of producing it", Houseman wrote.

Aldous Huxley also contributed to the screenplay, rendering the character of Mrs. Rochester unseen—assuring that she would be more menacing, and circumventing British censorship regulations on the depiction of madness. Other contributors to the script include DeWitt Bodeen and playwright Keith Winter.

Houseman—who had nothing to do with producing the final film— said that he was unhappy when he saw the movie, and asked for his name to be removed. His credit stayed.

=== Under 20th Century Fox ===
Selznick executive Daniel O'Shea began to offer the production as a package, mandating the services of director Stevenson, star Joan Fontaine, architect William Pereira as production designer, and cinematographer George Barnes for it to go into production. The price was so "fabulous", according to Houseman, that it took a year to find a buyer.

In the midst of the war boom in November 1942, Selznick finally sold the package to William Goetz at 20th Century Fox, which Goetz was running in the absence of Darryl F. Zanuck.

It was an ambitious overall deal where Selznick sold the rights to several projects – with the talent contracted to him attached. Other film projects included The Keys of the Kingdom, and Claudia, as well as talent contracts with Stevenson, Alfred Hitchcock, Dorothy McGuire, George Barnes, Stanley Cortez, Gene Kelly, Alan Marshal, Ingrid Bergman, and Joan Fontaine. Of the projects sold, Jane Eyre was closest to being realised, but Selznick had been frustrated by his inability to get the right leading man.

=== Under Orson Welles ===
Selznick had always wanted Orson Welles to play the role of Edward Rochester, but despaired of ever getting him because of his contract with RKO Pictures. When Welles was signed for Jane Eyre in December 1942, he was no longer with RKO, and was eager to earn money to purchase, develop and cut the footage he had shot for It's All True, an ill-fated project for the U.S. government for which he had received no payment. He hired himself out as an actor—the first of many times that Welles would support his own film projects by acting in more conventional films.

Welles was also struggling to retain his place in Hollywood as a producer, and he negotiated a role as the associate producer of Jane Eyre as well as top billing. He was paid $100,000—the same amount he received for his multiple responsibilities in Citizen Kane.

Welles had already adapted Jane Eyre twice for radio. The Mercury Theatre on the Air broadcast of September 18, 1938, is lost because Welles used the acetate original to prepare the film and the recording was irreparably damaged.

On December 10, 1942, Selznick wrote Goetz that he and Welles agreed on the importance of casting character actors who were new to motion pictures. He offered to be present at a casting meeting, and asked that Welles be there, as well—"because I know few people in the history of the business who have shown such a talent for exact casting, and for digging up new people". Mercury Theatre players from stage and radio who appear in Jane Eyre include Agnes Moorehead, Erskine Sanford, Eustace Wyatt and Edith Barrett; but the character roles generally went to familiar Hollywood performers, many of them with British stage credits.

With his schedule finalised, Welles ended his run on Ceiling Unlimited, a CBS radio series created to glorify the aviation industry and dramatize its role in World War II, on February 1, 1943. For 13 episodes, he had written, "produced, and narrated this show, and his work was considered a prime contribution to the war effort", wrote the Museum of Broadcasting.

=== Music ===
Welles and Selznick persuaded 20th Century Fox to hire Bernard Herrmann to compose the score for Jane Eyre.

When the film's co-producer with Welles, Kenneth Macgowan, asked Herrmann what work he had done before, the composer angrily replied, "Well, I never hearda you, either!" Herrmann based his score for Jane Eyre on the score he had written for "Rebecca" (December 9, 1938), the first episode of Welles's radio series, The Campbell Playhouse. (Note: In April 1943, while scoring Jane Eyre, Bernard Herrmann started working on his opera Wuthering Heights, based on the novel of the same name by Charlotte Brontë's sister Emily. He quoted some themes from his film scores in the opera; the love theme introduced in the opening titles of Jane Eyre is heard in Cathy's Act III aria, "Oh I'm burning".) Alfred Newman, head of the Fox music department, admired Herrmann's work for RKO and gave him the rare privilege of conducting his own score—the first of many that Herrmann wrote for the studio. (Note: Darryl F. Zanuck had initially hoped to hire Igor Stravinsky to compose the music for Jane Eyre, which would have been his debut score, but their negotiations broke down. Stravinsky completed music for a hunting scene, which he later used in his Ode for orchestra, premiered in 1943.)

=== Filming ===
Jane Eyre was in production from February 3 until mid-April 1943.

On April 8, The Hollywood Reporter noted that Welles would receive an onscreen credit as associate producer. In an April 17 memo to Goetz, which he blind-copied to Stevenson, Selznick protested that such a credit would be unfair to the director, "who pretty clearly took up the responsibility of producer where I left off."

You know as well as I do that Orson is such a personality that if he is credited as a producer, Stevenson's credit is likely to degenerate into something of a stooge status, as has occurred with Norman Foster on Journey into Fear—and, mind you, on Journey into Fear, Orson chose not even to have his own name appear in connection with the production ...

Three months later, in a letter to 20th Century Fox, a Selznick attorney agreed to Welles receiving a producer credit if he wanted it:

We have only just learned that Mr. Welles did a great deal more producing on the picture than we had previously known. We have been informed by people from your studio that Mr. Welles worked on the sets, changes in the script, in casting, among other things, and that he had charge of the editing ...

Although the associate producer credit was stated in his contract, Welles chose to waive it. "Certainly I did a lot more than a producer ought to, but Stevenson didn't mind that", he later said, adding that they got along very well on the picture. "And I don't want to take credit away from him, all of which he deserves." No producer credit appears on the screen or in the Screen Achievement Records Bulletin of the Academy of Motion Picture Arts and Sciences.

== Release ==
Jane Eyre premiered in New York City on February 4, 1944, and in Los Angeles on February 10, 1944. Although the film had its British premiere in late December 1943, it bears a 1944 U.S. copyright in the screen credits and it is often considered a 1944 picture.

=== Critical reception ===
Bosley Crowther of The New York Times, in an ambivalent review, called Jane Eyre a "moody" film in which "[n]o depths of consuming passion are plumbed very diligently", but still spoke of it as "grimly fascinating in its own right", with "continuous vitality as a romantic horror tale" in which Welles's "ferocious performance" was "interesting to observe." Writing in The Nation in 1944, critic James Agee stated, "There is almost no symbolic resonance and almost no really taking or revealing tension in the film ... all you get is a careful and tame production, a sadly vanilla-flavored Joan Fontaine, and Welles treating himself to road-operatic sculpturings of body, cloak, and diction, his eyes glinting in the Rembrandt gloom, at every chance, like side-orders of jelly. It is possible to enjoy his performance as dead-pan period parody; I imagine he did."

== Home media ==
- 1993: Fox Video, VHS (1247), ISBN 978-0-7939-1247-6, 1993
- 2007: 20th Century Fox Home Entertainment, Region 1 DVD, UPC 024543425748, 2007.
  Special features theatrical trailer and production stills; audio commentary by Joseph McBride and Margaret O'Brien; audio commentary by Nick Redman, Steven C. Smith and Julie Kirgo; isolated music track; "Know Your Ally: Britain", directed by Robert Stevenson; "Locked in the Tower: The Men Behind Jane Eyre" (2006), written and directed by John Cork, with commentary by Scott McIsaac, Simon Callow, Bob Thomas, Hugh Stevenson, Venetia Stevenson and Ursula Henderson.
- 2013: Twilight Time, Screen Archives Entertainment, Blu-ray Disc (limited edition of 3,000), November 12, 2013. Includes special features in 2007 DVD release. Critic Glenn Erickson wrote, "Bernard Herrmann fans will be interested in the film's isolated 'M&E' (music and sound effects) track, which makes this disc a dynamite soundtrack experience as well."
