= Vincent Price Award =

The Vincent Price Award (also known as the Price Award) was created by Miles Flanagan and Victoria Price to both honor Vincent Price's film and art legacy and fundraise for the arts.

The award is presented at Hollywood Horrorfest, an annual horror film festival, founded by Flanagan and based in Los Angeles. It was created to celebrate Vincent Price's legacy by honoring an artist "whose work has achieved equally iconic status" in the horror/fantasy genres. Joe Dante, director of Gremlins and The Howling, was the first recipient of the award, at the New Beverly Cinema in March 2014. The event is held annually as part of Hollywood Horrorfest at the Eastwood Performing Arts Center in Los Angeles.

== History ==
The award is presented each year by Victoria and Miles. The event fundraised for the Vincent Price Art Museum and in 2025 set up the Vincent Price Scholarship to fundraise for individual students at East Los Angeles College (ELAC). Vincent Price and his then wife, Mary Grant, from 1957 onwards gifted their personal art collection—2,000 pieces in total—to the college.

== Honorees ==
Many of the honorees have worked with or have been influenced by Price's work. Honoree, Cassandra (Elvira) Peterson told the Huffington Post, "It's better than an Academy Award," after winning the Price Award in July 2018. Weeks before his death, Sid Haig posted online his feelings on winning the Vincent Price Award, stating "On Saturday night August 10th I had the greatest night of my career."The list of honorees:

- Joe Dante: Director of Gremlins and The Howling.
- Cassandra Peterson: Elvira's Haunted Hills.
- Sid Haig: Spider Baby, House of 1000 Corpses.
- John Landis: Director of An American Werewolf in London and Michael Jackson's Thriller.
- Rick Baker: The Academy Award-winning makeup effects artist for An American Werewolf in London and Michael Jackson's Thriller.
