= Zach Hively =

American author (born 1985)

Zach Hively (born 1985) is an American humorist, poet, creative nonfiction author, and publisher. His most recent works include the poetry collections Desert Apocrypha, recipient of the Reading the West Book Award for poetry, Owl Poems, and Wild Expectations. He has written the Fool's Gold humor column since 2014, which has run in various alternative publications in the US American West.

== Biography ==
Hively was born on September 21, 1985, in Albuquerque, New Mexico. His family remained in Albuquerque, where he was raised. He attended college at the University of New Mexico, graduating in 2007 with a degree in English-Philosophy. He undertook a Fulbright English Teaching Assistantship in Olpe, Germany, after graduation.

He then attended the graduate program in creative writing at Trinity College Dublin's Oscar Wilde Centre. He served as managing editor for the centre's anthology, A Thoroughly Good Blue and graduated with an MPhil in Creative Writing in 2013.

Hively then relocated to Durango, Colorado, where he began writing for the Durango Telegraph as a recurring columnist and reporter. He also contributed to Edible Southwest Colorado, Four Corners Free Press, and Durango Magazine.

== Writing ==
Hively is an author and artist, known for writing, poetry, and nonfiction. His ongoing column Fool's Gold has appeared in numerous alternative newspapers, including the Durango Telegraph, the New Mexico Mercury, Four Corners Free Press, and the KC Post. The column has received several nods from the Society of Professional Journalists' Top of the Rockies awards, a regional, multi-platform contest for reporters and news organizations. Fool's Gold earned first place in the Personal/Humor Column category in 2024, 2022, 2018, and 2017, and third place in 2021 and 2016. Currently, Fool's Gold publishes monthly in the Durango Telegraph and the online-only Abiquiú News.

These columns were compiled in the 2024 book Call Me Zach Hively Because That Is My Name.

Hively's poetry has been published both internationally and regionally, in publications like Banshee, Trickster, and Conceptions Southwest. His second collection, Desert Apocrypha, received the 32nd annual Reading the West Book Award for poetry, after being shortlisted by member bookstores in the Mountains & Plains Independent Booksellers Association.

Owl Poems, published in 2022, was shortlisted for the 33rd annual Reading the West Book Award.

Hively has published a number of shorter works as well, including the foreword to V. B. Price's Innocence Regained: Christmas Poems and several short stories.

Hively is the recipient of a 2021 New Mexico Writers grant to support work on a forthcoming creative nonfiction project. He also earned a Maxwell Medallion from the Dog Writers Association of America in 2018 for his episode on The Raven Narratives podcast, "The Doggie Bucket List."

== Recognition ==
- 2016 – Third place, Society of Professional Journalists Top of the Rockies awards, in the Personal/Humor column category, for Fool's Gold
- 2017 – First place, Society of Professional Journalists Top of the Rockies awards, in the Personal/Humor column category, for Fool's Gold
- 2018 – Recipient, Dog Writers Association of America Maxwell Medallion, in the Radio, Podcast, or Other Audio category, for "The Doggie Bucket List" – The Raven Narratives
- 2018 – First place, Society of Professional Journalists Top of the Rockies awards, in the Personal/Humor column category, for Fool's Gold
- 2021 – Finalist, New Mexico/Arizona Book Awards, New Mexico Poetry category, for Wild Expectations
- 2021 – Third place, Society of Professional Journalists Top of the Rockies awards, in the Personal/Humor column category, for Fool's Gold
- 2021 – Recipient, New Mexico Writers grant
- 2022 – First place, Society of Professional Journalists Top of the Rockies awards, in the Personal/Humor column category, for Fool's Gold
- 2022 – Winner, 32nd annual Reading the West Book Awards for the poetry collection Desert Apocrypha
- 2023 – Shortlist, 33rd annual Reading the West Book Awards for the poetry collection Owl Poems
- 2024 – First place, Society of Professional Journalists Top of the Rockies awards, in the Personal/Humor column category, for Fool's Gold
- 2025 – Winner, New Mexico Book Award (Humor category) for Call Me Zach Hively Because That Is My Name
