= Durango Telegraph =

The Durango Telegraph is an independent weekly publication based in Durango, Colorado. The Telegraph began publication on August 22, 2002. Founded as an alternative to the region's dominant daily newspaper, the Telegraph was named after a popular local mountain bike trail.

The Telegraph features reporting on environmental, recreational, political, arts, and entertainment news in the Four Corners region of Southwestern Colorado. It also features regular opinion pieces under the header "La Vida Local" and original political cartoons. The paper is distributed every Thursday to stands in and around Durango at no cost, with the marketing tagline "Free but not easy."

The Telegraph also publishes the quarterly magazine The Gulch, which focuses on stories, long-form journalism, and photography.

== Publishers ==
- Missy Votel

== Regular contributors ==
- Lainie Maxson
- Missy Votel
- Steve Eginoire
- Shan Wells
- Chris Aaland
- Zach Hively
- David Feela
- Joy Martin
- Luke Mehall
- Jennaye Derge
- Ari Levaux
- Jeff Mannix
- Rachel

=== Notable past contributors ===
- Stew Mosberg
- Jen Reeder
- Tracy Chamberlin
- Clint Reid
- Allen Best
- Stacy Falk
