= Mary Grant Price =

Welsh-American costume designer (1917–2002)

- Born: Eleanor Mary Grant; 20 February 1917; Broad Haven, Pembrokeshire, Wales
- Died: 2 March 2002 (aged 85); Boston, Massachusetts, U.S.
- Education: University of Washington
- Occupation: Costume designer
- Years active: 1943–1972
- Spouse: Vincent Price (m. 1949; div. 1973)
- Children: Victoria Price

Mary Grant Price (20 February 1917 – 2 March 2002) was a Welsh-American costume designer who worked in theatre and film. She worked professionally under the name Mary Grant. She began her career on Broadway in the mid-1930s, first as an assistant to Raoul Pene Du Bois, and later as a lead designer during the 1940s. In 1943 she began working in film and spent much of the 1940s and 1950s designing costumes for Hollywood motion pictures. She was a member of the Academy of Motion Picture Arts and Sciences.

== Biography ==
Price was born Eleanor Mary Grant in Broad Haven, Pembrokeshire, Wales. She studied dance for one semester at the University of Washington before moving to New York City to study design. She began her career as an assistant designer to Raoul Pene Du Bois in 1935 at the age of 18. She also worked during the late 1930s and early 1940s as an assistant to Miles White. She worked with these two men on several notable Broadway shows, including the original productions of DuBarry Was a Lady (1939), Sons o' Fun (1941), and Oklahoma! (1943) among others.

As head designer, she designed costumes for eight Broadway shows, including Mexican Hayride (1944) and Marinka (1945). Between 1943–1972, Grant designed costumes for 14 motion pictures, beginning with Follies Girl which was released in 1943.

While working on the film Up in Central Park (1948) she met actor Vincent Price. She became Price's second wife in 1949, becoming the stepmother of Vincent Barrett Price (b. 1940) and giving birth to the couple's daughter, Victoria Price, in 1962. In 1950, the family were living at 1815 Benedict Canyon Drive in Beverly Hills. Between the years 1965 and 1969, Grant co-authored a series of cookbooks with her husband.

Mary and Vincent divorced in 1973. Mary died, aged 85, in Boston, Massachusetts

== Filmography ==
- Follies Girl (1943)
- The Princess and the Pirate (1944)
- Wonder Man (1945)
- Up in Central Park (1948)
- Texas, Brooklyn & Heaven (1948)
- Bride of Vengeance (1949)
- Red Stallion in the Rockies (1949)
- We're No Angels (1955)
- The Vagabond King (1956)
- The Bachelor Party (1957)
- Sweet Smell of Success (1957)
- Separate Tables (1958)
- The Devil's Disciple (1959)
- An Evening of Edgar Allan Poe (1972)

== Books ==
- Price, Vincent and Price, Mary Grant, A Treasury of Great Recipes: Famous Specialties of the World's Foremost Restaurants Adapted for the American Kitchen. Bernard Geis Associates, 1965; ISBN 978-1-121-11113-4.
- Price, Vincent and Price, Mary Grant, Mary and Vincent Price Present A National Treasury of Cookery. Heirloom Publishing Company, 1967; OCLC 1450485
- Price, Vincent and Price, Mary Grant, Come Into the Kitchen Cook Book: A Collector's Treasury of America's Great Recipes. Stravon Educational Press, 1969; ISBN 978-0-87396-020-5
