= Rini Price =

American painter and visual artist (1941–2019)

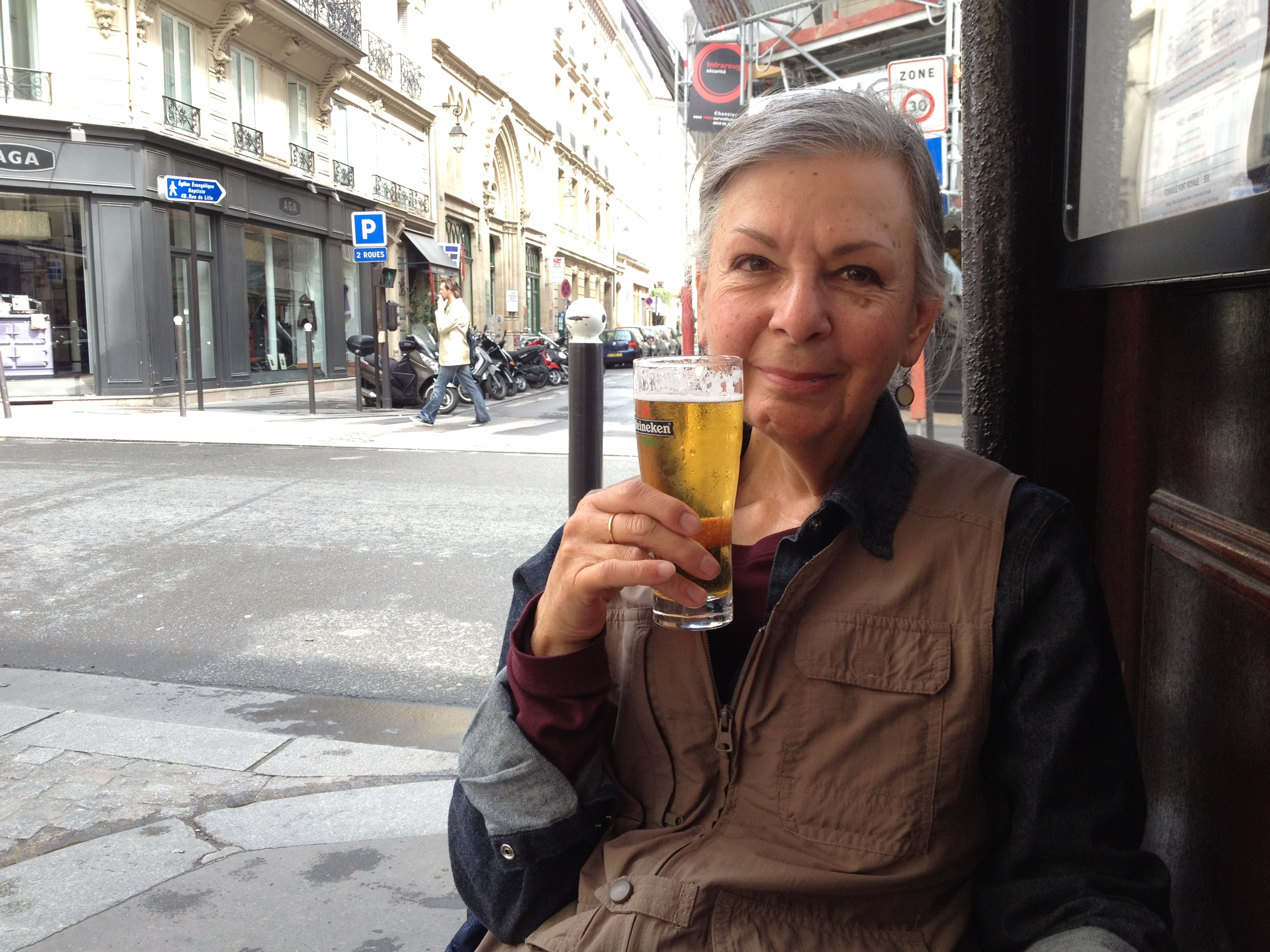
- Price in 2012
- Born: Nancy L. Rini; March 9, 1941; Gary, Indiana
- Died: October 19, 2019 (aged 78); Albuquerque, New Mexico, US
- Known for: Painting, drawing
- Spouse: V. B. Price
- Website: http://riniprice.com/

Rini Price (March 9, 1941 – October 19, 2019) was an American painter and visual artist from New Mexico. Her work is included in the Albuquerque Museum of Art and History's permanent collection and the Capitol Art Collection at the Roundhouse in Santa Fe, in addition to many private collections. Although she is generally identified as an abstract or figurative artist, her body of work defies definition, and she never considered herself a member of any school or movement. She completed thousands of drawings and hundreds of paintings during her career. She remained reclusive in that she voluntarily removed herself from academic art and the commercial gallery system, showing only occasionally in one-woman and group exhibitions. She died on October 19, 2019.

== Early life and education ==
Rini Price was born of Sicilian and German ancestry to S. Jack Rini and Marjorie Herman Rini in Gary, Indiana. The family, including her siblings Jim and Jacki, moved frequently during her childhood. Her father was a chemical engineer working with vegetable fats and oils, and the family relocated for jobs throughout Indiana and in Chicago, Boston, and ultimately Memphis, where he was Vice President of Research and Production for Kraft. Price was thirteen when she landed in Tennessee. She had never before witnessed discrimination and racism to the degree prevalent in the South during the time of Jim Crow laws, and they outraged her.

She left Tennessee as soon as she was able, relocating to Albuquerque in 1958 to study art at the University of New Mexico. "I checked the encyclopedia and found that New Mexico had very few people per square mile," she later said. "I also saw that it had mountains… so here I am."

Price found relief among New Mexico's various cultures and relative acceptance between them. "New Mexico always made me feel freer than other places," she said. "That makes a difference no matter what type of art you're involved with." Her best and most enduring friendships, including those with track stars John J. Cordova and one-time world-record holder Adolph Plummer, frequently originated outside artistic circles, though she also forged lifelong friendships with such classmates as Richard Masterson and Richard Hogan.

She studied art and art history with professors including Les Haas, Bainbridge Bunting, John Tatschl, and Kenneth Adams. She began a course of graduate study at UNM under Clinton Adams and Van Deren Coke, but she left before completion, refusing to box herself in to either the program's desire that she become a Modern painter or the dominant Western academic and critical worldview that women painters were inferior to men.

Price's prime directive became to make art, rather than trying to do anything with it. She supported herself as an educational illustrator for the Westinghouse Learning Corporation from 1964 to 1969. She held her first one-woman show at the Double Mporium in Corrales, New Mexico, in 1968.

In 1969, she married the poet and journalist V. B. Price, and that same year she began to focus her career entirely on her own artistry.

== Career and reception ==
Rini Price diligently kept herself focused on her art rather than on the art world. "I have worked most of my life in an isolated fashion. It's where I'm comfortable," she said. Yet despite her private nature, she still included her work in more than two dozen exhibitions throughout her career: of her art, she said, "I still want it to exist in the world."

Her styles vary, and her subjects include human figures, abstract checkered patterns, perfect circles, strangely mechanical sketches, trees, and emotions. She worked in several mediums, including acrylics, ink, and graphite. From the time of her first exhibition in 1968, critics and reviewers struggled to pin her work into existing categories.

Her style "rather defies description," the Albuquerque Tribune wrote about her debut show in Corrales. The reviewer chose to describe her "as a landscape artist—the ironic, treacherous landscape of the mind" whose paintings "suggest the terror of Kafka, the existential irony of Dostoyevski, the warm appreciation of Marianne Moore and the diabolical humor of Swift."

Of her work a quarter century later—the "Death Self" paintings, completed in the early- to mid-1990s and displayed and published in collaboration with her husband's poetry in 2005—Crosswinds Weekly wrote that "Rini Price's paintings are a quirky mix of darkness and mirth. … [The Death Self] paintings are vibrant abstract figurative studies that celebrate life, warts and all."

In the late 1990s and early 2000s in particular, Price emphasized her more abstract work over the human form, such as in her 2004 "Circles, Stripes, and Squares" show at Galerie E in Albuquerque. "At the moment," she said at that time, "I am rather discouraged with my species."

Yet later that same year, she hung the "Our Species" exhibition at the American Institute of Architects. This collection of work showed several nameless people in various states of emotion, as well as pieces featuring figures from literature. "The famous figures I draw, mostly women, are usually just objectified through art," she explained in an interview. "I try to explore them and how they might have viewed things."

Throughout her career, Price remained true to her oft-repeated philosophy: "My work is not who I am, but what I do with who I am."

At times, Price branched into other ventures. In 1980, along with V. B. Price and her siblings, the cartoonist Jim Rini and photographer Jacki Rini Fuqua, she founded New Mexico's Century magazine and served as its art director until the magazine folded in 1983.

Price's artwork graces the covers of several books, including Margaret Randall's The Rhizome as a Field of Broken Bones and many of V. B. Price's works. His 2020 collection of Christmas poems, Innocence Regained, features her artwork of Santa Claus on the cover as well as her own sly inclusion of herself—fitting, as V. B. credits her with inspiring his annual poems. "She always looked at life as a gift," he said in an interview. "Christmas is a time of delight, and she wanted to retain that delight and gratitude for every little pleasure we could take." The book is dedicated in her memory.

After Rini Price's death in 2019, V. B. Price encapsulated her artistic life and contributions for her website:

"Rini understood as deeply as any artist in the Western tradition the full emotional range of what it means to be a human being. All her creative life, she explored her feelings and those of her friends and family. She was always on the move in the landscape of the psyche, both her own, as it 'showed up' beneath her pencils and brushes, and the psyches and lives of women and men unfolding through the crucibles of history and personality. Her figurative expression of rage, of furious disappointment, of innocent elation, and sweet, pure joy made her work nurturing to all who saw it. Her visual adventures with myth and pattern, the compassion of her art, the fellow feeling she had with all people struggling to make sense of the world and the most of their lives, her stand-up communion with people of hope and perseverance, these all made her an artist who served the mystery of 'making new things,' virtually every day, and who lived the kind of quiet life, off to one side, that made it possible. Rini always used to joke about 'the species,' the human species, which she trusted to be exactly what it is and what it turns out to be, nothing more or nothing other. When history turned inexplicable and absurd as it always does, she'd wave her arms and shake her head and say, with mock authority, 'It's the species.' For Rini, the feminist and human rights activist, humanity was her 'subject matter,' and her devoted and tenderest concern. Even when her own struggles overwhelmed her, at times, she never gave up on what it means to be us, as we are, creatures of insight and kindness, flawed to the quick, but worth the best all of us can give."

== Personal and family life ==
Rini Price met the poet and journalist V. B. Price in Albuquerque in 1967. The two attended the University of New Mexico simultaneously in the previous decade, but did not meet until both were working with the Westinghouse Learning Corporation. They married in 1969 and shared a home in Albuquerque's North Valley for fifty years. They have two sons, Jody Price who lives with his wife Amy in Santa Fe, New Mexico, and Keir Price of Kinnelon, New Jersey, and two grandchildren, Ryan and Talia Price.

In 1979, Price was diagnosed with a virulent form of thyroid cancer that recurred twice by 1984. She underwent two major operations, and the third occurrence was deemed inoperable and uncurable. Yet she survived her cancer. She attributed her survival in part to her humor, her determination, and her artistic discipline. She reduced the frequency of her public showings after 1984, however, driven with renewed fervor to make art more than to do anything else with it. She frequently met with and supported other people with cancer, offering some help and guidance for their own hopes of survival.

Much of Price's family followed her to Albuquerque in the decades after her own relocation. Her parents moved to New Mexico from Tennessee in 1977, as did her sister, her two nephews, and her brother. Her mother died in 1980, her father in 2005, and her sister in 2014.

Rini Price continued making her art nearly every day, even during the early years of her dementia, until the condition made creating impossible. After nearly five years of advancing dementia, during much of which her husband served as her primary caregiver, she died of respiratory failure at Lovelace Hospital in Albuquerque on October 19, 2019.

== Notable shows and exhibitions ==
- The Albuquerque Museum, permanent collection, 2010
- The Albuquerque Museum, "Albuquerque Now" invitational exhibition, 2010
- Price-Dewey Gallery, Santa Fe, "The Art of Journaling" invitational group show, 2006
- Artspace 116, Albuquerque, "Death Self" with poems by V. B. Price, 2005
- American Institute of Architects, Albuquerque, "Our Species" one-woman show, 2004
- Galerie E, Albuquerque, "Circles, Stripes, and Squares" one-woman show, 2004
- Off Center Gallery, Albuquerque, "Ranting and Raving" group show, 2004
- Capitol Art Collection, Santa Fe, permanent collection 1998
- Albuquerque Festival of the Arts, "Magnifico! Invites" group invitation show, 1991
- Pannell Library, New Mexico Junior College, Hobbs, one-woman show, 1979
- Mariposa Gallery, Albuquerque, eleven invitational theme exhibitions, 1974–1998
- Mariposa Gallery, Albuquerque, "The Doll Show" and "Ritual and Ceremonial Objects" invitational group exhibitions, 1977 & 1979
- The Albuquerque Museum, "Woman's Show," 1978
- "Easter Eggcelebration," Albuquerque and Hartford, CT, 1976
- Workshop Originals Contemporary Gallery, Albuquerque, one-woman show, 1974
- Navajo Gallery, Taos, and Talisman Gallery, Santa Fe, MS Six group shows, 1972
- Double Mporium, Corrales, NM, one-woman show, 1968

== Books and publications ==
- Death Self, with poems by V. B. Price, Wingspread Guides of New Mexico, 2005.
- Cover art, Innocence Regained: Christmas Poems, by V. B. Price, Casa Urraca Press, 2020.
- Cover art, Memoirs of the World in Ten Fragments, by V. B. Price, Wings Press, 2018.
- Cover art, The Rhizome as a Field of Broken Bones, by Margaret Randall, Wings Press, 2013.
- Cover art, Broken and Reset: Selected Poems 1966 to 2006, by V. B. Price, UNM Press, 2007.
- Cover art, Mythwaking: Homeric Hymns: A Modern Sequel, by V. B. Price, St. Elizabeth Street Press, 2004.
- Cover art, The Oddity, by V. B. Price, UNM Press, 2004.
- "Angel on Hard Times," painting reproduced as Wingspread Guides of New Mexico's annual Christmas card, 1998.
- Cover art and illustrations, The 7 Deadly Sins, V. B. Price, La Alameda Press, 1997.
- Art Director, illustrator, cartoonist, Century: A Southwest Journal of Observation and Opinion, 1980–1983.
- Cover art and internal art, Semblances, by V. B. Price, Sunstone Press, 1976.
- Cover art and internal art, The Cyclops Garden, by V. B. Price, 1969.
