= Vincent Price =

American actor (1911–1993)

- Price in House on Haunted Hill (1959)
- Born: Vincent Leonard Price Jr. May 27, 1911; St. Louis, Missouri, U.S.
- Died: October 25, 1993 (aged 82); Los Angeles, California, U.S.
- Education: Yale University (BA); Courtauld Institute of Art
- Occupations: Actor; art historian; art collector; food writer
- Years active: 1935–1993
- Spouses: Edith Barrett (m. 1938; div. 1948); Mary Grant (m. 1949; div. 1973); Coral Browne (m. 1974; died 1991)
- Children: Vincent Barrett Price; Victoria Price
- Awards: Hollywood Walk of Fame: 2 stars (TV, Film)

Vincent Leonard Price Jr. (May 27, 1911 – October 25, 1993) was an American actor, best known to film audiences for his work in the horror genre, mostly portraying villains. He appeared on stage, television, and radio, and in more than 100 films. Price has two stars on the Hollywood Walk of Fame, one for motion pictures and one for television.

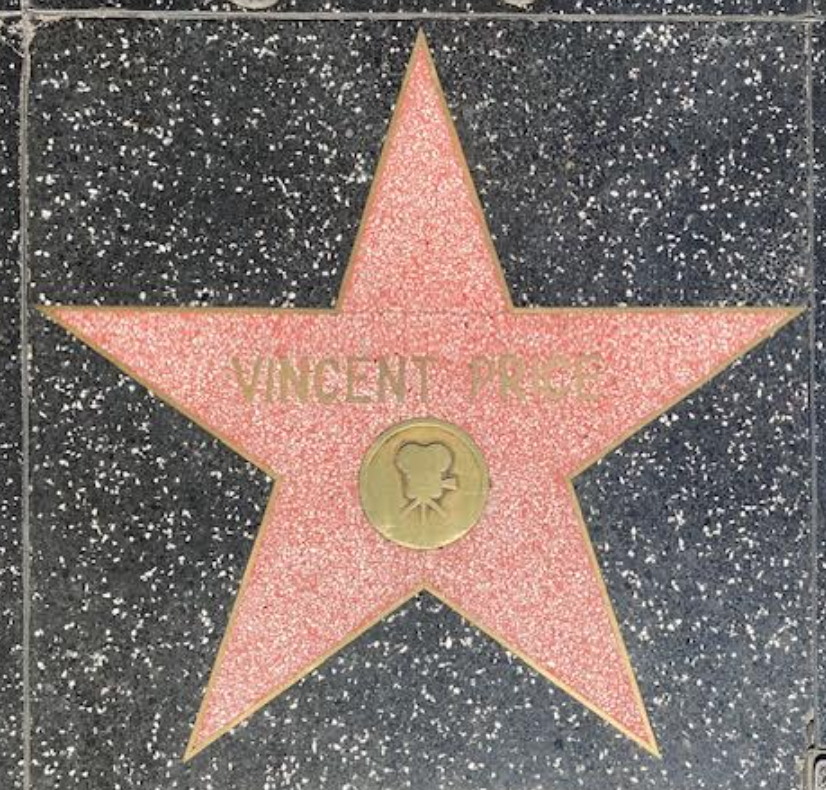
Price's star on the Hollywood Walk of Fame for his achievements in film

After varied stage work, including a stint with the Mercury Theatre, Price's first film role was as a leading man in the 1938 comedy Service de Luxe. He became a character actor, appearing in The Song of Bernadette (1943), Laura (1944), The Keys of the Kingdom (1944), Leave Her to Heaven (1945), Dragonwyck (1946), The Three Musketeers (1948) and The Ten Commandments (1956). He established himself in the horror genre with roles in House of Wax (1953), The Fly (1958), House on Haunted Hill (1959), Return of the Fly (1959), The Tingler (1959), The Last Man on Earth (1964), Witchfinder General (1968), The Abominable Dr. Phibes (1971), and Theatre of Blood (1973). He collaborated with Roger Corman on a series of Edgar Allan Poe adaptations, including House of Usher (1960), The Pit and the Pendulum (1961), The Haunted Palace (1963), and The Masque of the Red Death (1964). Price appeared in the television series Batman as Egghead.

Vincent Price voiced the villainous mastermind Professor Ratigan in Disney's full-length 26th animated feature film The Great Mouse Detective (1986), and appeared in the drama The Whales of August (1987), which earned him an Independent Spirit Award for Best Supporting Male nomination. Price's final film was as ZigZag in Arabian Knight/ The Thief and the Cobbler. For his contributions to cinema, he received lifetime achievement or special tribute awards from Academy of Science Fiction, Fantasy and Horror Films; Fantasporto; Bram Stoker Awards; and Los Angeles Film Critics Association. Price narrated animated films, radio dramas, and documentaries, and provided the narration in Michael Jackson's song "Thriller". For his voice work in Great American Speeches (1959), Price was nominated for a Grammy Award for Best Spoken Word Album.

Price was an art collector and arts consultant, with a degree in art history. He lectured and wrote books on art. The Vincent Price Art Museum at East Los Angeles College is named in his honor. Price was a gourmet cook and cookbook author.

== Early life and education ==
Vincent Leonard Price Jr. was born on May 27, 1911, in St. Louis, Missouri, the youngest of the four children of Vincent Leonard Price, president of the National Candy Company, and his wife Marguerite Cobb (née Wilcox) Price. His grandfather was Vincent Clarence Price, who invented "Dr. Price's Baking Powder", the first cream of tartar-based baking powder, and it secured the family's fortune. Price was of Welsh and English descent and was a descendant, via his paternal grandmother, of Peregrine White, the first child born in colonial Massachusetts, being born on the Mayflower while it was in Provincetown Harbor in Massachusetts.

Price attended the St. Louis Country Day School, and took a summer course at Milford Academy in Milford, Connecticut. In 1933, he graduated with a degree in English and a minor in art history from Yale University, where he worked on the campus humor magazine The Yale Record. After teaching for a year, he entered The Courtauld Institute of Art in London, intending to study for a master's degree in fine arts.

Instead he was drawn to the theater, first appearing on stage professionally in 1935 in the play Chicago at the Gate Theatre in London. Next he introduced the role of Prince Albert in Laurence Housman's play Victoria Regina, also at the Gate Theatre in 1935. Later that year he moved to New York City to reprise the role of Prince Albert in the Broadway production of Victoria Regina, opposite Helen Hayes in the title role of Queen Victoria. He played the role for two seasons at the Broadhurst Theatre, through June 1937. In 1938 he appeared in productions of The Shoemaker's Holiday and Heartbreak House with Orson Welles' Mercury Theatre company. From 1941 to 1942, Price played Mr. Manningham in Angel Street, the Broadway production of Gas Light, which he helped bring to New York.

== Career ==
=== Early film roles ===
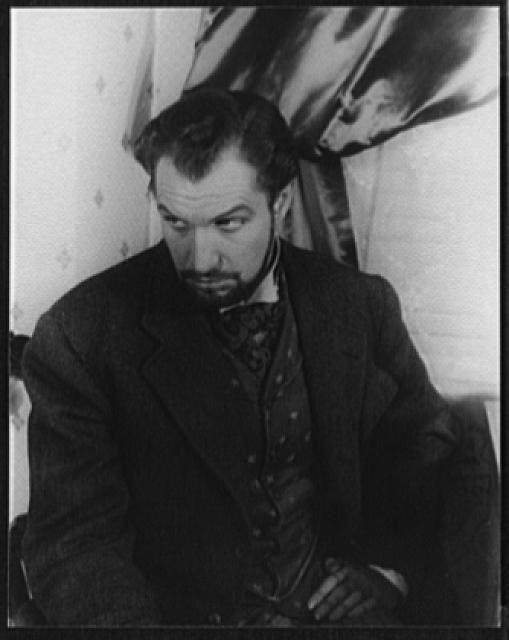
Price as Mr. Manningham in the play Angel Street (1941–1942)

Price started out in films as a character actor. He made his film debut in Service de Luxe (1938), and established himself in the film Laura (1944), opposite Gene Tierney, directed by Otto Preminger. He played Joseph Smith in the movie Brigham Young (1940) and William Gibbs McAdoo in Wilson (1944), as well as Bernadette's prosecutor, Vital Dutour, in The Song of Bernadette (1943), and as a pretentious priest in The Keys of the Kingdom (1944).

Price's first venture into the horror genre, for which he later became widely known, was in the Boris Karloff film Tower of London (1939). The following year, Price portrayed the title character in The Invisible Man Returns (a role he reprised in a voice-only cameo in the closing scene of the horror-comedy spoof Abbott and Costello Meet Frankenstein, released in 1948). He reunited with Tierney in Leave Her to Heaven (1945) and Dragonwyck (1946). He also had many villainous roles in film noir thrillers such as The Web (1947), The Long Night (1947), Rogues' Regiment (1948), and The Bribe (1949), with Robert Taylor, Ava Gardner, and Charles Laughton.

Price's first starring role was as con man James Reavis in the biographical film The Baron of Arizona (1950). He did a comedic turn as the tycoon Burnbridge Waters, co-starring with Ronald Colman in Champagne for Caesar (also 1950), one of his favorite film roles.

=== 1950s ===
Price was active in radio, portraying the Robin Hood-inspired crime-fighter Simon Templar in The Saint, which ran from 1947 to 1951. In the 1950s, Price moved into more regular horror-film roles with the leading role in House of Wax (1953) as a homicidal sculptor, the first three-dimensional film to land in the year's top 10 at the North American box-office. His next roles were The Mad Magician (1954), the monster movie The Fly (1958), and its sequel Return of the Fly (1959). That same year, Price starred in two thrillers by producer-director William Castle: House on Haunted Hill as eccentric millionaire Fredrick Loren, and The Tingler as Dr. Warren Chapin, who discovered the titular creature. He appeared in the radio drama Three Skeleton Key, the story of an island lighthouse besieged by an army of rats. He had first performed the work in 1950 on Escape and returned to it in 1956 and 1958 for Suspense.

Outside the horror realm, Price played Baka in The Ten Commandments, released in 1956. About this time, he also appeared in episodes of television shows such as Science Fiction Theatre, Playhouse 90, and General Electric Theater. In the 1955–56 television season, he was cast three times on the religion anthology series Crossroads. In the 1955 episode "Cleanup", Price portrayed the Reverend Robert Russell. In 1956, he was cast as Rabbi Gershom Mendes Seixas in "The Rebel", and as the Rev. Alfred W. Price in "God's Healing".

=== 1960s ===
The Last Man on Earth (full movie)

In the 1960s, Price achieved a number of low-budget filmmaking successes with Roger Corman and American International Pictures (AIP) starting with the House of Usher (1960), which earned over $2 million at the box office in the United States and led to the subsequent Edgar Allan Poe adaptations of The Pit and the Pendulum (1961), Tales of Terror (1962), The Comedy of Terrors (1963), The Raven (1963), The Masque of the Red Death (1964), and The Tomb of Ligeia (1964). He starred in The Last Man on Earth (1964), the first adaptation of the Richard Matheson novel I Am Legend, and later starred as Felix Manderville in House of 1,000 Dolls (1967), which has been described as "quite possibly the sleaziest movie AIP ever made". A year later, Price portrayed witch hunter Matthew Hopkins in Witchfinder General, (US: The Conqueror Worm, 1968) set during the English Civil War. Price also starred in comedy films such as Dr. Goldfoot and the Bikini Machine (1965) and its sequel Dr. Goldfoot and the Girl Bombs (1966). In 1968, he played the part of an eccentric artist in the musical Darling of the Day, opposite Patricia Routledge.

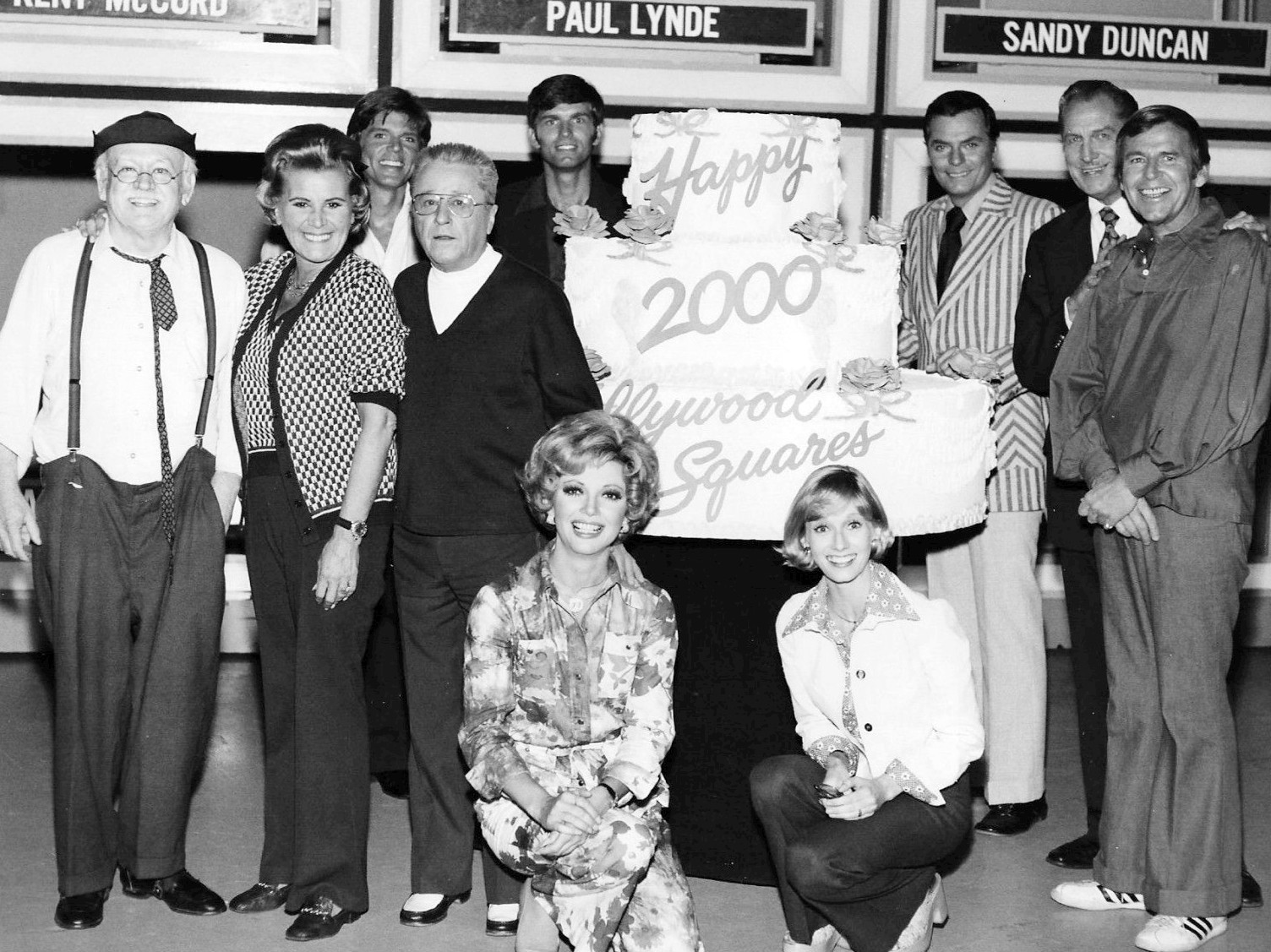
Photo from the television game show Hollywood Squares to celebrate the 2,000th episode in 1974. Pictured are Cliff Arquette as Charley Weaver, Rose Marie, John Davidson, George Gobel, Kent McCord, Peter Marshall, Price, Paul Lynde; Ruta Lee and Sandy Duncan, foreground.

In the 1960s, Price began his role as a guest on the television game show Hollywood Squares, becoming a semi-regular in the 1970s, including being one of the guest panelists on the finale in 1980.

Price made many guest-star appearances in television shows during the decade, including The Red Skelton Show, Daniel Boone, F Troop, Get Smart, The Man from U.N.C.L.E., and Voyage to the Bottom of the Sea. He had a recurring role in the Batman TV series as the villain Egghead from 1966 to 1967. In 1964, he provided the narration for the Tombstone Historama in Tombstone, Arizona, which was still in operation as of 2016. He also starred as the host of the Australian TV series If These Walls Could Speak, in which a short history of an historical building (supposedly narrated by the building itself) was covered, and as the narrating voice of the building.

=== 1970s ===
During the early 1970s, Price hosted and starred in BBC Radio's horror and mystery series The Price of Fear. He accepted a cameo part in the Canadian children's television program The Hilarious House of Frightenstein (1971) in Hamilton, Ontario, on the local television station CHCH-TV, filming all of his 400 segments over the course of only a few days. In addition to the opening and closing monologs, his role in the show was to recite poems about various characters, sometimes wearing a cloak or other costumes. He appeared in The Abominable Dr. Phibes (1971), its sequel Dr. Phibes Rises Again (1972), and Theatre of Blood (1973), in which he portrayed one of two serial killers. That same year, he appeared as himself in Mooch Goes to Hollywood, a film written by Jim Backus.

Price was an admirer of the works of Edgar Allan Poe, and in 1975 visited the Edgar Allan Poe Museum in Richmond, Virginia, where he had his picture taken with the museum's popular stuffed raven. Price also recorded dramatic readings of Poe's short stories and poems, which were collected together with readings by Basil Rathbone.

In 1975, Price and his wife Coral Browne appeared together in an international stage adaptation of Ardèle, which played in the U.S. and in London at the Queen's Theatre. During this run, Browne and Price starred together in the BBC Radio play Night of the Wolf first airing in 1975. Price greatly reduced his film work from around 1975, as horror itself suffered a slump, and he increased his narrative and voice work. One role he did during this period was advertising Milton Bradley's Shrunken Head Apple Sculpture.

Price provided a monologue for the Alice Cooper song "The Black Widow" on the Welcome to My Nightmare album in 1975, and he appeared in the corresponding TV special Alice Cooper: The Nightmare. He starred for a year in the early 1970s in the syndicated daily radio program Tales of the Unexplained. He made guest appearances in a 1970 episode of Here's Lucy, showcasing his art expertise, and in a 1972 episode of ABC's The Brady Bunch, in which he played a deranged archaeologist. In October 1976, he appeared as the featured guest in an episode of The Muppet Show. In 1977, Price recorded a cover version of Bobby "Boris" Pickett's 1962 Single record The Monster Mash produced by UK record producers Ken Burgess and Bob Newby and released in the UK by EMI Records.

Also in 1977, Price began performing as Oscar Wilde in the one-man stage play Diversions and Delights, written by John Gay and directed by Joe Hardy, and set in a Parisian theater on a night about one year before Wilde's death. The original tour of the play was a success in every city except for New York City. In the summer of 1979, Price performed the role of Wilde at the Tabor Opera House in Leadville, Colorado, on the same stage from which Wilde had spoken to miners about art some 96 years before. He eventually performed the play worldwide. Victoria Price stated in her biography of her father that several members of Price's family and friends thought that this was his best acting performance.

In 1979, Price starred with his wife in the short-lived CBS series Time Express. That same year he hosted the hour-long television special America Screams, riding on several roller coasters and recounting their history. During 1979–1980, he hosted the "Mystery Night" segment of the radio series Sears Radio Theater.

=== Later career ===
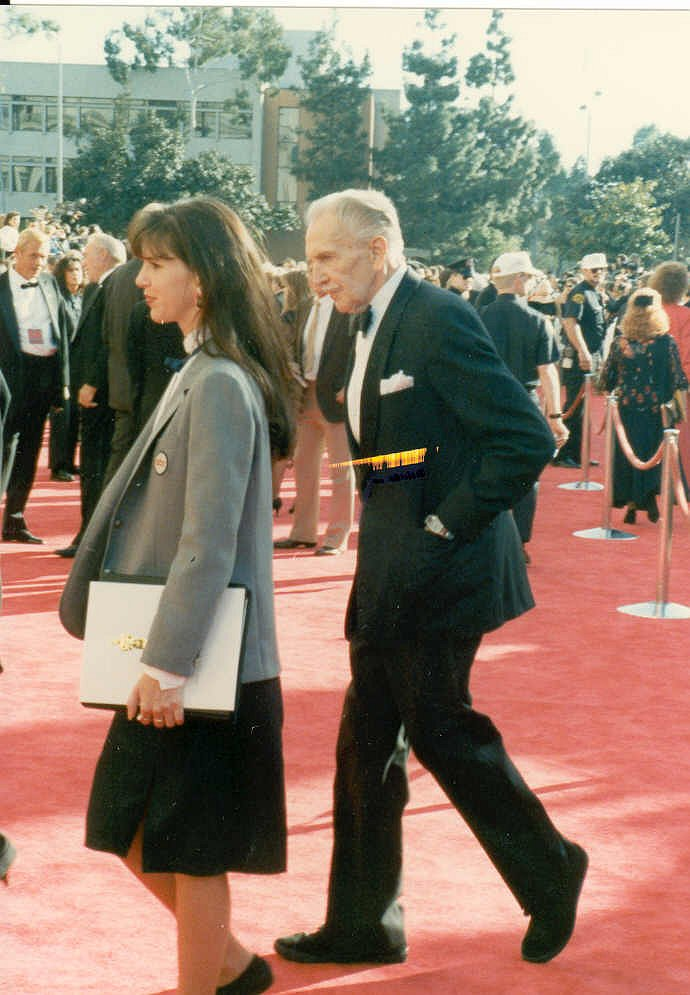
Price on the red carpet at the 1989 Academy Awards

In 1982, Price provided the narrator's voice in Vincent, Tim Burton's six-minute film about a young boy who flashes from reality into a fantasy where he is Vincent Price. That same year, Price provided the spoken-word sequence throughout the Michael Jackson song "Thriller", and appeared as Sir Despard Murgatroyd in a television production of Gilbert and Sullivan's Ruddigore (with Keith Michell as Robin Oakapple). In 1983, he played the Sinister Man in the British spoof horror film Bloodbath at the House of Death. He appeared in House of the Long Shadows with Christopher Lee, Peter Cushing, and John Carradine; he had worked with each of those actors at least once in previous decades, but this was the first time that all had teamed up. One of his last major roles, and one of his favorites, was as the voice of Professor Ratigan in Walt Disney Pictures' The Great Mouse Detective in 1986.

From 1981 to 1989, Price hosted the PBS television series Mystery! In 1985, he provided voice talent on the Hanna-Barbera series The 13 Ghosts of Scooby-Doo as the mysterious "Vincent Van Ghoul", who aided Scooby-Doo, Scrappy-Doo, and the gang in recapturing thirteen demons. He was a lifelong fan of roller coasters, and he narrated a 1987 thirty-minute documentary on the history of roller coasters and amusement parks, including Coney Island. During this time (1985–1989), he appeared in horror-themed commercials for Tilex bathroom cleanser.

In 1984, Price appeared in Shelley Duvall's live-action series Faerie Tale Theatre as the Mirror in "Snow White and the Seven Dwarfs", and the narrator for "The Boy Who Left Home to Find Out About the Shivers". In 1987, he starred with Bette Davis, Lillian Gish, and Ann Sothern in The Whales of August, a story of two sisters living in Maine facing the end of their days. His performance in The Whales of August earned an Independent Spirit Award for Best Supporting Male.

In 1989, Price was inducted into the St. Louis Walk of Fame. His last significant film work was as the inventor in Tim Burton's Edward Scissorhands (1990).

In 1990, Price recorded the narration of the Phantom for the Phantom Manor attraction at Disneyland Paris. However, shortly after the ride opened in 1992, the narration was removed and replaced with one entirely in French, performed by Gérard Chevalier. Only Price's infamous laughter remained on the soundtrack. In 2018, during a major renovation, it was announced that parts of Price's narration would be restored. Since the 2019 reopening, the new tracks are dual-language; Price's original excerpts as well as previously unused material from his 1990 recording comprise the English-speaking portions, while actor Bernard Alane voices the Phantom in French.

== Art ==
Price, who studied art history at Yale, was an art lover and collector. He was a commissioner of the Indian Arts and Crafts Board.

In 1957, impressed by the spirit of the students and the community's need for the opportunity to experience original artworks firsthand, Vincent and Mary Grant Price donated 90 pieces from their private collection and a large amount of money to establish the Vincent Price Art Museum at East Los Angeles College in Monterey Park, California, which was the first "teaching art collection" owned by a community college in the United States. They ultimately donated some 2,000 pieces; the collection contains over 9,000 pieces and has been valued in excess of $5 million.

Price also spent time working as an art consultant for Sears, Roebuck and Co. From 1962 to 1971, Sears offered the "Vincent Price Collection of Fine Art", selling about 50,000 fine-art prints to the general public. Works that Price selected or commissioned for the collection included some by Rembrandt, Pablo Picasso, and Salvador Dalí. Public access to fine art was important to Price, who, according to his daughter Victoria, saw the Sears deal as an "opportunity to put his populist beliefs into practice, to bring art to the American public." In the 1960s, portraits of Native Americans painted by Charles Bird King were secured for Jacqueline Kennedy's White House restoration. Through the efforts of Vincent Price, these five paintings were paid for and donated to the White House Collection by Sears.

Price amassed his own extensive collection of art, and in 2008, a painting bought for $25 by a couple from Dallas was identified as a piece from Price's collection. Painted by leading Australian modernist Grace Cossington Smith, it was given a modern valuation of AU$45,000.

== Cooking ==
Price was a gourmet cook, and he authored several cookbooks with his second wife, Mary. These include:

- A Treasury of Great Recipes (1965)
- Mary and Vincent Price present a National Treasury of Cookery (1967)
- Mary and Vincent Price's Come into the Kitchen Cook Book: A Collector's Treasury of America's Great Recipes (1969)
- Cooking Price-Wise with Vincent Price (1971)

Mary and Vincent Price present a National Treasury of Cookery was a five-volume series, packaged in a boxed set and published by the Heirloom Publishing Company. These five books were combined into a single book two years later and published as Mary and Vincent Price's Come into the Kitchen Cook Book: A Collector's Treasury of America's Great Recipes. Most of the Prices' cookbooks remained in print throughout the 1970s. After being out of print for several decades, two of their books were reprinted; A Treasury of Great Recipes (in August 2015 by Calla Editions) and Mary and Vincent Price's Come into the Kitchen Cook Book (in November 2016 by Calla Editions), both featuring new forewords by their daughter Victoria Price. Cooking Price-Wise with Vincent Price was scheduled to be reprinted by Dover Publishing in October 2017 under the updated title Cooking Price-Wise – The Original Foodie.

The movie His Kind of Woman has a comedic scene in which Price, having invited Jane Russell and Robert Mitchum to dinner, receives bad news. He plays the entire scene holding a duck in his hand, ready to be cooked "soaked in sherry with only salt, sage, and pepper."

In 1971, Price hosted his own cooking program on British television, called Cooking Price-Wise produced for the ITV network by Thames Television, which was broadcast in April and May 1971. This show gave its name to Price's fourth and final cookbook later that year. Price promoted his cookbooks on many talk shows, one of the most famous instances being the November 21, 1975, broadcast of The Tonight Show Starring Johnny Carson, when he demonstrated how to poach a fish in a dishwasher.

Price recorded a number of audio cooking tutorials titled International Cooking Course. These were titled Bounty of Paradise, Classical Spanish Cuisine, Cuisina Italiana, Delights from the Sultan's Pantry, Dinner at the Casbah, Dining at Versailles, Exotic Delights from the Far East, Food of the Gods, Foods from the Austro-Hungarian Empire, La Cocina Mejicana, The Bard's Board, and The Wok. In addition to those, he recorded an audio wine course titled Wine Is Elegance. These audio recordings were released on 33⅓ LPs by Nelson Industries in 1977 and were also packaged in a 12-cassette boxed set titled Beverly Hills Cookbook – Cookbook of the Rich and Famous, Your Host Mr. Vincent Price.

In August 1982, he co-hosted A Taste of China for Thames Television over five episodes. He also prepared a fish recipe on Wolfgang Puck's Cooking with Wolfgang Puck VHS, released in October 1987 by Warner Home Video.

== Personal life ==
Price married three times. His first marriage was in 1938 to former actress Edith Barrett; they had one son, poet and columnist Vincent Barrett Price. Edith and Price divorced in 1948. Price married Mary Grant in 1949, and they had a daughter, inspirational speaker Victoria Price, on April 27, 1962, naming her after Price's first major success in the play Victoria Regina. The marriage lasted until 1973. He married Australian actress Coral Browne in 1974; she had appeared as one of his victims in Theatre of Blood (1973). The marriage lasted until her death in 1991.

Victoria Price's biography Vincent Price: A Daughter's Biography (1999) details Price's early antisemitism and initial admiration for Adolf Hitler. According to his daughter: "When he went to Germany and Austria as a young man, he was struck by a lot of things going on during the Weimar Republic and the dissolution of the empire... So when Hitler came into power, instead of seeing him as a dangerous force, he was sort of swept up in this whole idea that Hitler was going to bring German pride back." However, Price became a liberal after becoming friends with New York intellectuals such as Dorothy Parker and Lillian Hellman in the 1930s, so much so that he was "greylisted" under McCarthyism in the 1950s for having been a pre-war "premature anti-Nazi". After being unable to find work for a year, he agreed to requests by the FBI that he sign a "secret oath" to save his career. Victoria said that her father became so liberal that "one of my brother's earliest memories is when Franklin Roosevelt's death was announced, my father fell backward off the sofa sobbing."

Price denounced racial and religious prejudice as a form of poison at the end of an episode of The Saint, which aired on NBC Radio on July 30, 1950, claiming that Americans must fight against it because such prejudices within the United States fuel support for the nation's enemies. He was later appointed to the Indian Arts and Crafts Board under the Dwight D. Eisenhower administration; he called the appointment "kind of a surprise, since I am a Democrat".

Price was supportive of his daughter Victoria when she came out as a lesbian and joined PFLAG as an honorary board member. He was critical of Anita Bryant's anti–gay rights campaign in the 1970s. Price was also one of the first celebrities to film a public service announcement to help allay public fears about HIV/AIDS. In an interview in 2015, Victoria said that her father confided in her his intimate relationships with men when she came out to him as a lesbian.

Price was an Episcopalian by birth, but he made a deal with his third wife, the Australian actress Coral Browne, that he would convert to Catholicism if she became an American citizen. According to reports, Price took weekly instruction at a local parish, St. Victor, and was received into the Catholic Church sometime after 1987, a few years before his death in 1993. Price was also associated with St. Victor's Catholic Church in West Hollywood, which later held Browne's funeral Mass. Throughout his career, Price appeared in several major films with religious subject matter, including The Song of Bernadette (1943), The Keys of the Kingdom (1944), and The Ten Commandments (1956).

== Illness and death ==
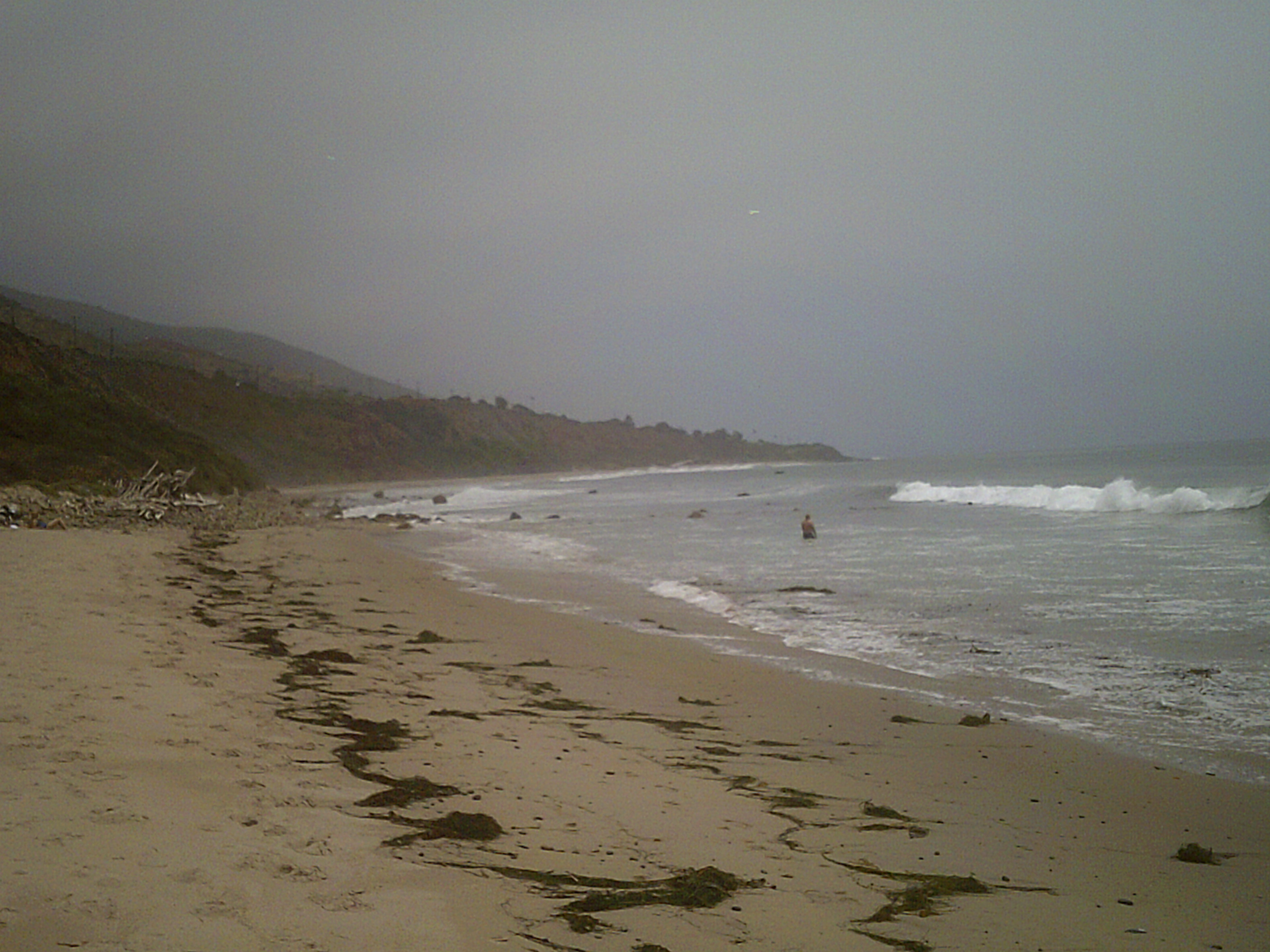
A view of Nicholas Canyon Beach from South Beach

Price suffered from chronic obstructive pulmonary disease and Parkinson's disease. His symptoms were especially severe during the filming of Edward Scissorhands, requiring his filming schedule to be shortened. His illness also contributed to his retirement from Mystery! in 1989.

Price died at age 82 of lung cancer on October 25, 1993, at his home in Los Angeles, California. His remains were cremated and his ashes scattered off Nicholas Canyon Beach, near Point Dume in Malibu.

== Legacy ==
The A&E Network aired an episode of Biography the night following Price's death, highlighting his horror-film career, but because of its failure to clear copyrights, the show was never aired again. Four years later, A&E produced its updated episode, titled Vincent Price: The Versatile Villain, which aired on October 12, 1997. The script was by Lucy Chase Williams, author of The Complete Films of Vincent Price. In early 1991, Tim Burton was developing a personal documentary with the working title Conversations with Vincent, in which interviews with Price were shot at the Vincent Price Gallery, but the project was never completed and was eventually shelved.

Price was an honorary board member and strong supporter of the Witch's Dungeon Classic Movie Museum in Bristol, Connecticut, until his death in 1993. The museum features detailed life-sized wax replicas of characters from some of Price's films, including The Fly, The Abominable Dr. Phibes, and The Masque of the Red Death. A black-box theater at Price's alma mater, Mary Institute and St. Louis Country Day School, is named after him.

"Vincent Twice, Vincent Twice" was a muppet who hosted "Mysterious Theater" on Sesame Street, spoofing Price's hosting of Mystery! Price was parodied in an episode of The Simpsons ("Sunday, Cruddy Sunday"). Price had his own Spitting Image puppet, who was always trying to be "sinister" and lure people into his ghoulish traps, only for his victims to point out all the obvious flaws. Rhythmeen, the ZZ Top album from 1996, includes a track named "Vincent Price Blues".

Starting in November 2005, featured cast member Bill Hader of the NBC sketch comedy/variety show Saturday Night Live has played Price in a recurring sketch in which Price hosts botched holiday specials filled with celebrities of the 1950s/'60s. Other cast members who played Price on SNL include Dan Aykroyd and Michael McKean (who played Price when he hosted a season-10 episode and again when he was hired as a cast member for the 1994–95 season).

In 1999, a frank and detailed biography of Price written by his daughter, Victoria, was published by St. Martin's Press. In late May 2011, an event was held by the organization Cinema St. Louis to celebrate what would have been Price's 100th birthday. It included a public event with Victoria at the Missouri History Museum and a showcase of ephemeral and historic items at the gallery inside the Sheldon Concert Hall.

In an unusual convergence of widely different generational and cultural backgrounds, the genteel Price was a friend of the English hard rock band Deep Purple and in 1975, he appeared on Roger Glover's live version of The Butterfly Ball and the Grasshopper's Feast as a narrator. Decades later, in 2013, Deep Purple released "Vincent Price", a single the band members dedicated to him. That same year, American director and writer John Waters composed a "heartfelt and appreciative" retrospective on Price for Turner Classic Movies, which recognized the actor as its "Star of the Month" in October 2013 and showcased then a selection of his most popular films. The tribute was repeatedly broadcast on TCM to promote and complement those televised presentations. In sharing with viewers his feelings about Price, Waters at one point describes the actor's screen appeal, especially when he was featured in darker roles:

One raise of his eyebrow and you knew you were about to be thrilled by a debonair, evil, yet sympathetic villain...I can't imagine these films without Vincent Price in them. He was just a fine actor, never pretentious. The audiences that went to see him were all-inclusive, from the poorest people to the richest. Nobody disliked him. Vincent Price was classless, even though he was classy, an exaggerated gentleman. He gave upscale a good name, and he was always handsome, dignified, charming, and a little bit sinister.

== The Price Award ==
In 2014 Hollywood Horrorfest founder Miles Flanagan and Victoria Price created the Vincent Price Award (aka the Price Award). It celebrates "Vincent Price's unique artistic and iconic legacy by honoring an artist whose work has achieved equally iconic status in the horror/fantasy genres.” Presented by Victoria Price annually, as part of Hollywood Horrorfest, all profits from the event go to charity. The event fundraised for the Vincent Price Art Museum and in 2025 created the Vincent Price Scholarship to fundraise directly for individual students at East Los Angeles College, “the spiritual home of Vincent Price.”

Previous recipients include Joe Dante, Cassandra Peterson, Sid Haig, John Landis and Rick Baker.

== Bibliography ==
- Price, Vincent (1959). I Like What I Know – A Visual Autobiography. Garden City, NY: Doubleday. ISBN 9781504042161.
- Price, Vincent (1961). The book of Joe; about a dog and his man. Doubleday. OCLC 1292943.
- Price, Mary; Price, Vincent (1965). A Treasury of Great Recipes. Illustrated by Fritz Kredel. Bernard Geis Associates. ISBN 9781121111134.
- Price, Vincent; Price, Mary Grant (1967). Mary and Vincent Price Present A National Treasury of Cookery. Heirloom Publishing Company. OCLC 1450485.
- Price, Vincent; Price, Mary Grant (1969). Come Into the Kitchen Cook Book: A Collector's Treasury of America's Great Recipes. Stravon Educational Press. ISBN 0873960203.
- Price, Vincent (1971). Cooking Price-wise with Vincent Price. Corgi Children's. ISBN 0552086657.
- The Vincent Price treasury of American art. Online Computer Library Center. 1972. ISBN 9780872940314. OCLC 539027.
- Price, Vincent (1978). Vincent Price: His Movies, His Plays, His Life. Doubleday & Co. ISBN 0385115946.
- Price, Vincent; Price, V.B. (1981). Monsters. Grosset & Dunlap. ISBN 9780448143057.

Introductions to works by others

- Peter Haining (ed). The Ghouls. New York: Stein and Day, 1971.
- Tom Hutchinson. Horror and Fantasy in the Movies. New York: Crescent Books, 1974.

== Audio books ==
- Price, Vincent (1974). A Graveyard Of Ghost Tales. Caedmon Records (TC 1420) (LP record (57 minutes)).
