= Edith Barrett =

American actress (1907–1977)

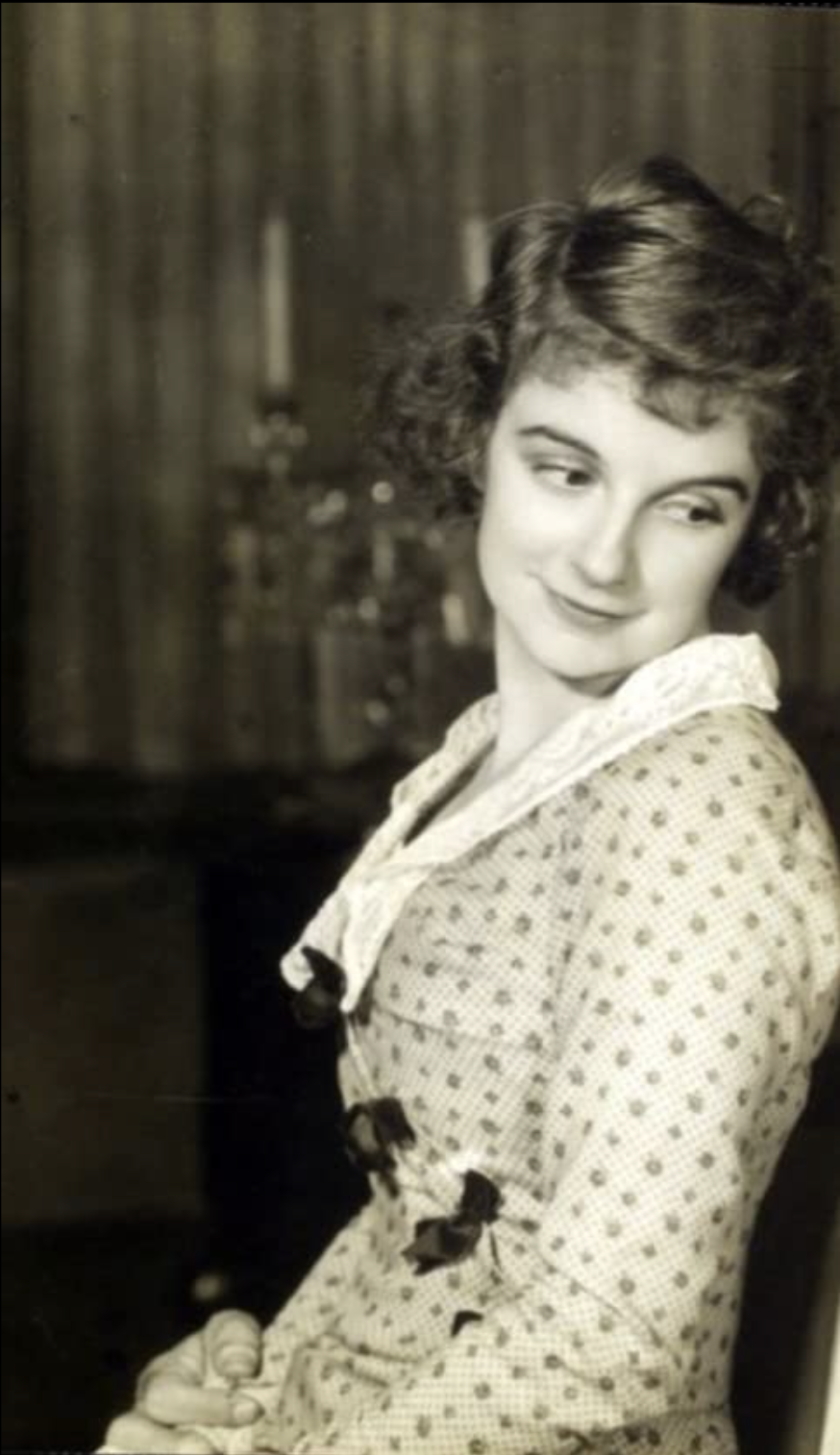
- Born: Edith Williams; January 19, 1907; Roxbury, Massachusetts, U.S.
- Died: February 22, 1977 (aged 70); Albuquerque, New Mexico, U.S.
- Occupation: Actress
- Years active: c.1923–1959
- Spouse: Vincent Price (m. 1938; div. 1948)
- Children: Vincent Barrett Price
- Relatives: Lawrence Barrett (grandfather)

Edith Barrett (born Edith Barrett Williams; January 19, 1907 – February 22, 1977) was an American actress. She was a romantic star on Broadway and in the Little Theatre Movement in New England summer stock from the mid-1920s to the late 1930s. Her repertoire included plays by James M. Barrie, William Shakespeare, Noël Coward, Robert Browning, A.A. Milne, and George Bernard Shaw. Her best-known cinematic work includes I Walked with a Zombie (1943), Ruthless (1948) and Jane Eyre (1943).

== Biography ==
Born in Roxbury, Massachusetts, Barrett was the daughter of Marshall S. P. Williams and Edith Barrett Williams and a granddaughter of 19th-century American tragedian Lawrence Barrett. She entered the entertainment industry at age 16 in a staging of Walter Hampden's production of Cyrano de Bergerac. At age 19, in 1926, she appeared with Hampden in Caponsacchi. During the 1930s, she performed as a cast member of Orson Welles's Mercury Theatre troupe.

While playing Sibil in the Mercury Theatre 1937 production of The Shoemaker's Holiday, she met leading man Vincent Price. The two married in 1938. Barrett moved to Southern California with her husband in late 1939 and gave birth to the couple's and Barrett's only child, author/poet and environmental activist Vincent Barrett (V. B.) Price, in 1940. Their marriage ended in 1948.

Barrett is often mentioned in a troika of Broadway stars of the 1930s alongside Eva Le Gallienne, Katherine Cornell, and sometimes Helen Gahagan. Her most famous roles include Pompelia, her first starring role, in Caponsacchi, which ran for five seasons, and as Sara Moonlight in the 1929 play Mrs. Moonlight by Benn Levy, with which she toured the country, performing more than 500 times. After opening night, the New York Times ran a review of her performance with the headline "A Star Is Born."

In 1934, she played Anne Brontë in the premiere of Dan Totheroh's play Moor Born about the Brontë sisters. Two years later, she was cast as Katherine O'Shea, the romantic lead in Elsie Schauffler's drama Parnell about the Irish nationalist leader Charles Stewart Parnell. Former New York Times drama critic Brooks Atkinson said of this role that Barrett gave “one of her best performances, if not the best performance, of her career.”

In total, Barrett's Broadway credits include Wuthering Heights (1939), The Shoemakers' Holiday (1938), Wise Tomorrow (1937), Parnell (1936), Symphony (1935), Piper Paid (1934), Allure (1934), Moor Born (1934), Strange Orchestra (1933), The Perfect Marriage (1932), Troilus and Cressida (1932), Mrs. Moonlight (1930), Michael and Mary (1929), Becky Sharp (1929), The Phantom Lover (1928), Caponsacchi (1926), The Immortal Thief (1926), King Henry IV, Part I (1926), The Servant in the House (1926), Cyrano de Bergerac (1926), The Merchant of Venice (1925), Hamlet (1925), and Trelawny of the "Wells" (1925).

After starring on Broadway often as the romantic heroine, her Hollywood career started as a character actress in 1941 in a film noir directed by Charles Vidor, Ladies in Retirement. She played one of the two half-witted half-sisters of Ida Lupino's homicidal character. Her best-remembered movie role is possibly Mrs. Holland's mother-in-law, Mrs. Rand, in the cult classic I Walked with a Zombie (1943), a movie sometimes described as Jane Eyre in the Caribbean. She was almost three years younger than her "son" in that film (played by Tom Conway). She appeared briefly onscreen with Price twice in The Song of Bernadette (1943) and again in Keys of the Kingdom (1944). The following year she was seen as Mrs. Fairfax in 20th Century-Fox's adaptation of the real Jane Eyre (1944). She retired from films after a minor role in The Swan (1956), compiling a filmography of more than 20 films.

In the mid-1950s, Barrett revived her career on television in a series of appearances in character roles in Alfred Hitchcock Presents. She essayed the role of Sarah Barnhart in a Telephone Time drama entitled Recipe for Success in 1958. She went on to perform in series such as Schlitz Playhouse of Stars, Westinghouse Desilu Playhouse, Lux Video Theatre, and Northwest Passage.

Barrett dedicated much of her later life to supporting fellow New York stage actresses who struggled in the motion picture and television industries. Reflecting on her own declining success in film and television, Barrett often remarked, "the screen just didn’t like me", suggesting she felt she wasn’t photogenic.

Barrett resided in Santa Monica, California from 1946 to 1976. She died at age 70 in Albuquerque, New Mexico, where she had been living near her son, V. B. Price, and his family. Barrett's New York Times obituary misreported her age as 64.

== Filmography ==
Year	Title	Role	Notes
1941	Ladies in Retirement	Louisa Creed	
1942	Lady for a Night	Katherine Alderson	
1942	Give Out, Sisters	Agatha Waverly	
1942	Get Hep to Love	Miss Roberts	
1942	You Can't Escape Forever	Madame Lucille	
1943	I Walked with a Zombie	Mrs. Rand	
1943	Always a Bridesmaid	Mrs. Cavanaugh	
1943	The Ghost Ship	Ellen Roberts	
1943	The Song of Bernadette	Croisine Bouhouhorts	
1943	Jane Eyre	Mrs. Fairfax	
1944	The Story of Dr. Wassell	Mother of Little English Boy	Uncredited
1944	Strangers in the Night	Ivy Miller	
1944	The Keys of the Kingdom	Aunt Polly	
1945	Molly and Me	Julia	
1945	That's the Spirit	Abigail	
1948	Ruthless	Mrs. Burnside	
1949	The Lady Gambles	Ruth Phillips	
1952	Holiday for Sinners	Mrs. Corvier	
1956	The Swan	Elsa - Beatrix's Maid	
1957	Alfred Hitchcock Presents	Felicia Green	Season 2 Episode 31: "The Night the World Ended"
1957	Alfred Hitchcock Presents	Aggie Whiteford	Season 2 Episode 33: "A Man Greatly Beloved"
1958	In Love and War	Mrs. Lenaine	Uncredited
