= V. B. Price =

American poet and writer (1940–2026)

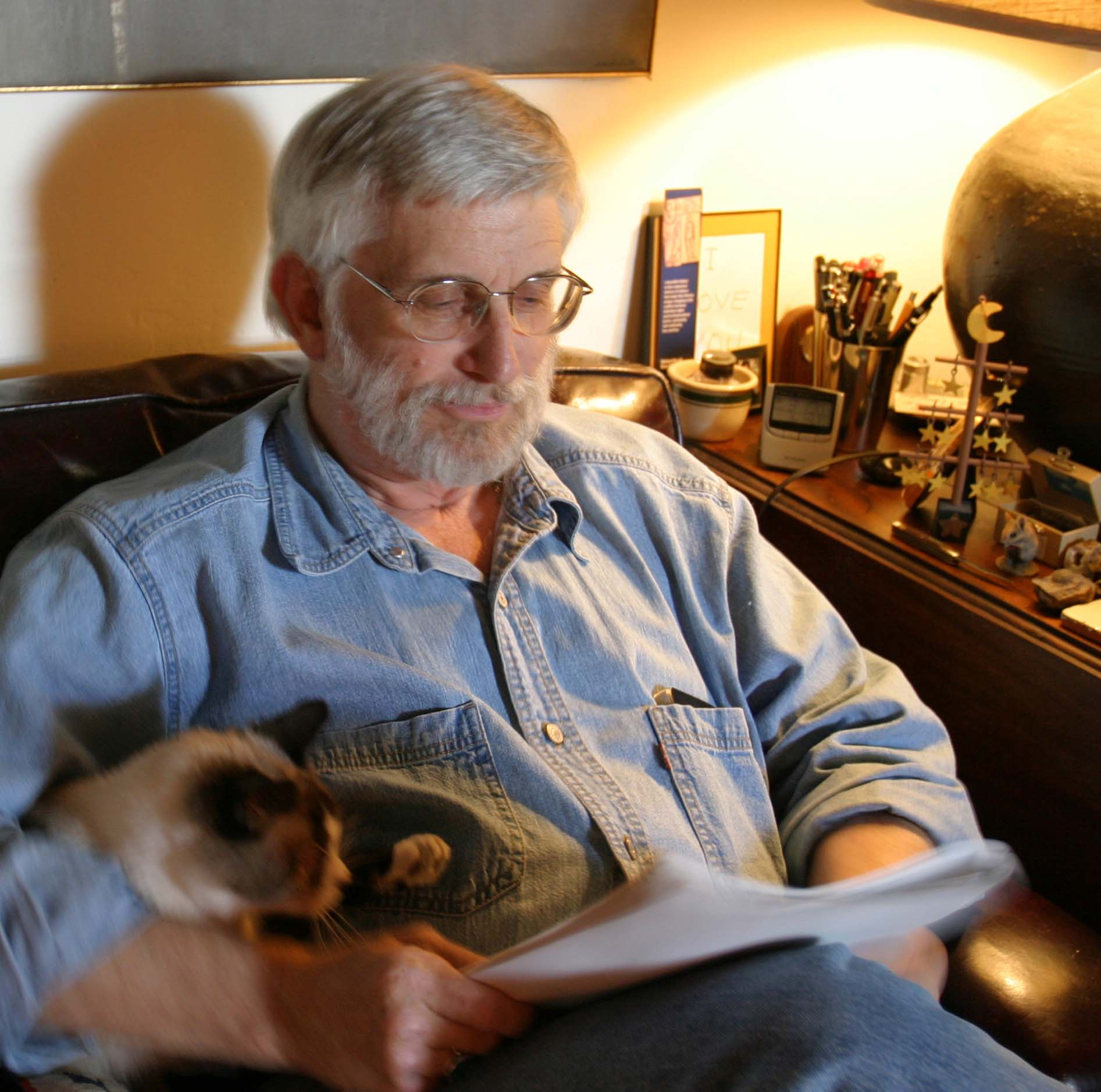
- Price in 2004
- Born: Vincent Barrett Price; August 30, 1940; Los Angeles, California, U.S.
- Died: November 11, 2026 (aged 86); Albuquerque, New Mexico, U.S.
- Education: University of New Mexico (B.A., 1962)
- Occupations: Poet; columnist; editor; journalist; novelist; teacher
- Spouse: Rini (m. 1969; died 2019)
- Children: 2
- Parents: Vincent Price; Edith Barrett
- Relatives: Victoria Price (half-sister)
- Writing career
- Years active: 1962–2026
- Genres: Poetry, journalism
- Subjects: Human rights, environment, architecture

Vincent Barrett Price (August 30, 1940 – November 11, 2026) was an American poet, human rights and environmental columnist, editor, reporter, publisher, novelist and teacher. His latest poetry collections included Chaco Now, Innocence Regained: The Christmas Poems 2025–1969, Orpheus the Healer, Lucretius and the Logic of Venus, Polishing the Mountain, or Catching Balance Just in Time: Selected Poems 2008–2020, and Memoirs of the World in Ten Fragments; and his late nonfiction books included A Reader's Guide to New Mexico Literature: Classic to Contemporary (with Baker H. Morrow) and The Orphaned Land: New Mexico's Environment Since the Manhattan Project. He was the co-founder, with Benito Aragon, of the New Mexico Mercury, an online platform featuring news, commentary and analysis from a variety of experts and writers around New Mexico. Since January 2017, the Mercury Messenger has featured Price's online column of politics and the environment.

Price taught off and on since 1976 in the University of New Mexico's School of Architecture and Planning, and as continuing faculty in the UNM Honors College from 1986 to 2014.

In 2021, he received the New Mexico Literary Arts Gratitude Award "for contributions to the life of the poetry community in New Mexico and the Southwest."

== Background ==
Price was born in Los Angeles, California, on August 30, 1940, the only son of actor Vincent Price (1911–1993) and his first wife, actress Edith Barrett (1907–1977). He moved to New Mexico in 1958 and came to identify with the state, its isolation and eccentricity, and its people, landscape, architecture, and traditional cultures. He graduated from the University of New Mexico in 1962 with a B.A. in anthropology. That same year he published his first poem and began a lifelong writing practice.

He first visited Chaco Canyon in 1961 and published his seminal work of poetry, Chaco Body, with photographer Kirk Gittings in 1992. After graduate school he worked as a reporter, and in 1971 he began a weekly column in New Mexico that has run almost continuously.

In 1969 Price married the artist Rini Price (1941–2019), and the couple began collaborating in the early 1970s. Rini created the covers for the majority of his books of poetry, and they worked together at Century Magazine. They had two sons, Jody Price, who lives with his wife Amy in Santa Fe, New Mexico, and Keir Price, who lives with his wife Helena in Jupiter, Florida, and two grandchildren, Ryan and Talia Price.

In 2016, Price received an honorary degree, Doctor of Letters (Litt. D), from his alma mater. He continued to write poetry, nonfiction, and his column about politics and the environment until his death.

Price died in Albuquerque, New Mexico, on November 11, 2026, at the age of 86.

== Career ==
Price's poetry and prose have been published in more than 70 national and international publications since 1962. He was the architecture editor for Artspace Magazine of Albuquerque and Los Angeles, and the former editor of New Mexico Magazine. Price was the city editor for the New Mexico Independent (print publication) and worked for the publication through the 1970s. He was the founding editor of Century Magazine, which ran from 1980 to 1983. He was an architecture critic at the Albuquerque Journal in the mid-1980s. He was also weekly columnist and regular contributor to The Albuquerque Tribune from 1978 until the newspaper closed in 2008. Price was an editorial contributor to the New Mexico Independent (online publication) from 2008 to 2009. He was the series editor of the Mary Burritt Christiansen Poetry Series at the University of New Mexico Press from 2004 to 2012. As an editor, he has brought the work of more than 500 New Mexican authors, poets, and scholars into print.

Among many books of poetry, Price has published two collections of selected poems: Broken and Reset (selected poems from 1966 to 2006, from UNM Press), and Polishing the Mountain, or Catching Balance Just in Time: Selected Poems 2008–2020 (Casa Urraca Press). His other retrospective collection is Innocence Regained: The Christmas Poems 2025–1969, which is a nearly comprehensive collection of his annual suites of poems given to friends every winter. The first edition of the book, published in 2020, was listed as a finalist in the Poetry category in the 2021 New Mexico/Arizona Book Awards. He authored several other poetry books in his later years, including Orpheus the Healer, Lucretius and the Logic of Venus, and Memoirs of the World.

In November 2026, UNM Press published A Reader's Guide to New Mexico Literature: Classic to Contemporary, which Price co-authored with longtime collaborator Baker H. Morrow. The book is believed to be the first work of its kind, a statewide reference guide to the authors, editors, and significant figures that comprise New Mexico's literary history.

In 2011, UNM Press also published Price's seminal book The Orphaned Land: New Mexico's Environment Since the Manhattan Project. In the book, Price analyzes fifty years of newspaper articles and government reports to reveal the environmental toll which New Mexico has paid for decades of military munitions testing, uranium mining, and population growth: unsustainable development, air and water pollution by multinational corporations and undue strain on the state's limited water supply, to name a few. Framing New Mexico as "a microcosm of global ecological degradation," Price explores the impacts and systematic breaches of public trust by some of the pervading power structures affecting the environment around the world: the military-industrial complex, multinational corporation's impact on local natural resources, and the lack of consideration of long-term environmental consequences in development planning. Speaking with Gene Grant on KNME-TV's New Mexico In Focus, Price stated that the Manhattan Project both transformed and deformed the American West. It elevated New Mexico into one of the intellectual and scientific epicenters of the Cold War, but it also resulted in 2,100 waste sites at Los Alamos National Laboratories in northern New Mexico and 400 waste sites at Sandia National Laboratories in Albuquerque. Marc Simmons of the Santa Fe New Mexican called the book "a stellar compendium focused on the state's slide toward ecological degradation."

== Recognition ==
- 2021 – Recipient of the New Mexico Literary Arts Gratitude Award
- 2021 – Elected to the board of directors for the Leopold Writing Program
- 2016 – Honorary Degree, Doctor of Letters (Litt. D.), University of New Mexico
- 2016 – Paul Bartlett Ré Peace Prize of the University of New Mexico, Lifetime Achievement Award
- 2014 – Top of the Rockies Award, First Place, Environmental Enterprise Reporting Online
- 2006 – Bravo Award for Excellence in Literary Arts from the Arts Alliance
- 2004 – Price's book, Albuquerque: A City At The End of the World, won the Fray Francisco Atanasio Dominguez Award for Historic Survey and Research
- 2003 – Citizen Planner of the Year award by the American Planning Association of New Mexico
- 2002 – Erna S. Fergusson Award, UNM Alumni, "for touching the minds of many and for service the University of New Mexico and to the greater community"
- 1999 – Humanist of the Year Award by the Humanist Society of New Mexico
- 1996 – ACLU-NM First Amendment Award for excellence in journalism
- 1989 – Friend of the Environment Award by the New Mexico Conservation Voters Alliance
- 1989 – UNM Centennial Distinguished Alumni award
- 1985 – Governor's Award for Historic Preservation in New Mexico
- 1984 – Award of Merit from the New Mexico Society of Architects for architectural criticism
- 1975 – Governor's Cultural Properties Review Committee's award for his "penetrating provocative editorials in defense of New Mexico's cultural environment"

== Books ==
- The Cyclops Garden (1969), San Marcos Press
- Semblances (1976), Sunstone Press
- Monsters (1982), with Vincent Price, Grosset and Dunlap
- Chaco Body (1992), photographs by Kirk Gittings, Artspace Press
- Albuquerque: A City at the End of the World (1995, 2003), UNM Press
- Anasazi Architecture and American Design (1996), co-editor with Baker Morrow, UNM Press
- The 7 Deadly Sins (1997), La Alameda Press
- Chaco Trilogy (1998), La Alameda Press
- The Oddity (2004), UNM Press; reissue forthcoming in 2027 by Casa Urraca Press
- Mythwaking: Homeric Hymns: A Modern Sequel (2004), St. Elizabeth Street Press; reissued in 2026 by Casa Urraca Press
- In Company: An Anthology of New Mexico Poetry Since 1960 (2004), co-editor, UNM Press
- Death Self (2005), paintings by Rini Price, Wingspread
- Canyon Gardens: The Ancient Pueblo Landscape of the American Southwest (2006), co-edited with Baker Morrow, UNM Press
- Broken and Reset: Selected Poems 1966-2006 (2007), UNM Press
- The University of New Mexico (2010), photographs by Robert Reck, UNM Press
- The Orphaned Land: New Mexico's Environment Since the Manhattan Project (2011), photographs by Nell Farrell, UNM Press
- ROME MMI (2016), photographs by Jan Schmitz, Blurb
- Memoirs of the World in Ten Fragments (2018), Wings Press
- Innocence Regained: Christmas Poems (2020), foreword by Zach Hively, Casa Urraca Press
- Polishing the Mountain, or Catching Balance Just in Time: Selected Poems 2008–2020 (2021), Casa Urraca Press
- Lucretius and the Logic of Venus (2023), Casa Urraca Press
- Orpheus the Healer (2025), Casa Urraca Press
- Chaco Now (2026), Casa Urraca Press
- A Reader's Guide to New Mexico Literature: Classic to Contemporary (2026), with Baker H. Morrow, UNM Press

== Television ==
- In the 1989 opening episode of KNME-TV's ¡Colores! series, Price interviews Godfrey Reggio about the film Koyaanisqatsi.
- In a 1993 episode of KNME-TV's ¡Colores! series, Price reads from his book Albuquerque: A City at the End of the World and expands on the past, present, and future of the city in videotaped interviews. Price continued intermittently to host ¡Colores! episodes in the 1990s, including an interview of architectural historian Rina Swentzell of Santa Clara Pueblo.
- In October 2011, Price was interviewed by Gene Grant for the KNME-TV–produced New Mexico In Focus. The interview revolved around Price's recently published book, The Orphaned Land: New Mexico's Environment Since the Manhattan Project.
- In January 2021, Price appeared on KNME-TV's ¡Colores! series to discuss dying and coming back to life, as well as reading from his unpublished poem "Travel Notes on Coming Back to Life" and "Reversing the Fall" from Innocence Regained: Christmas Poems.
