= Cyrano de Bergerac (1950 film) =

1950 film by Michael Gordon

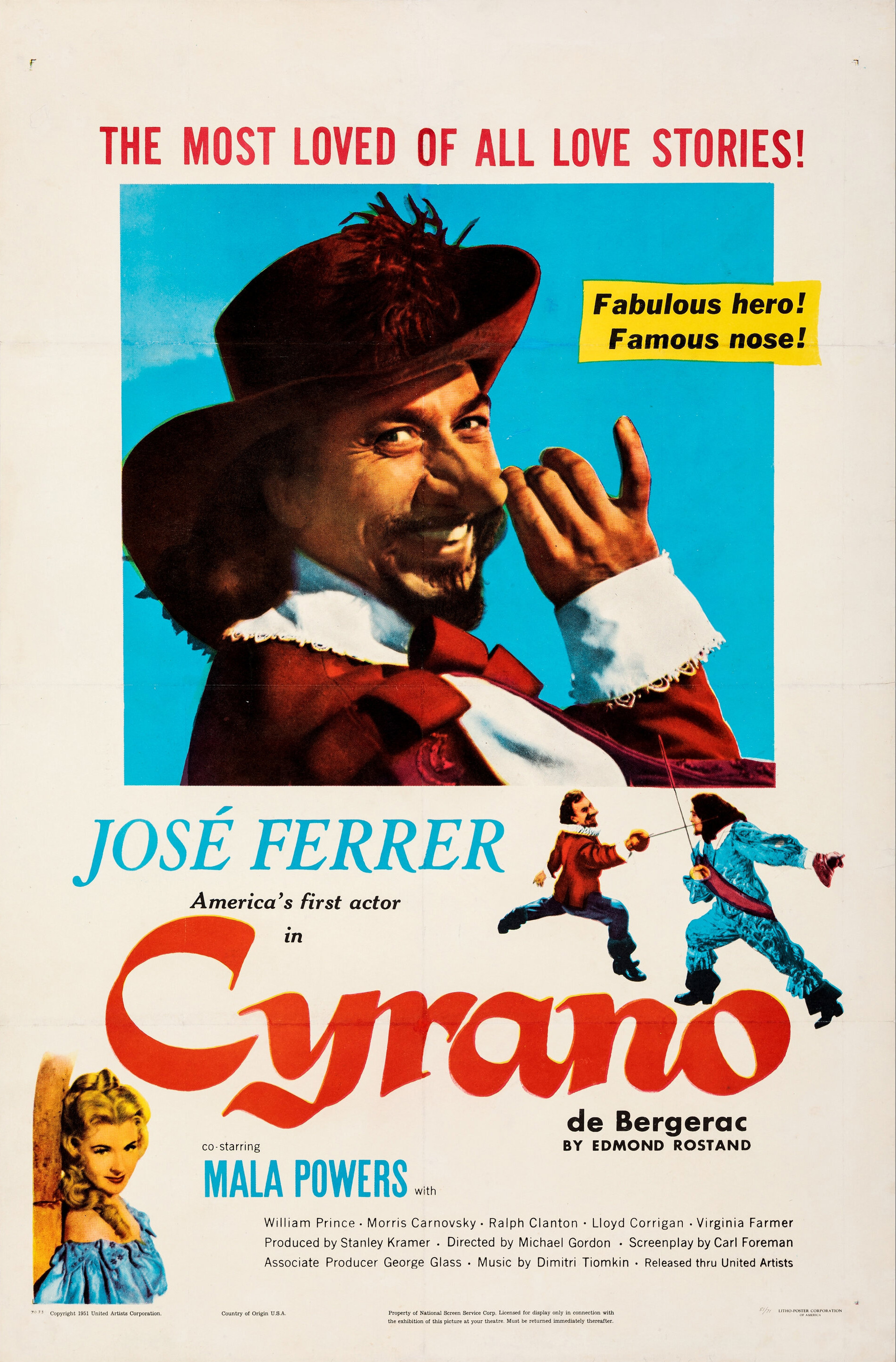
- Theatrical release poster
- Directed by: Michael Gordon
- Screenplay by: Carl Foreman; Brian Hooker (Translation)
- Based on: Cyrano de Bergerac by Edmond Rostand
- Produced by: Stanley Kramer
- Starring: José Ferrer; Mala Powers; William Prince
- Cinematography: Franz Planer
- Edited by: Harry W. Gerstad
- Music by: Dimitri Tiomkin
- Production company: Stanley Kramer Productions
- Distributed by: United Artists
- Release dates: November 16, 1950 (New York); November 20, 1950 (Beverly Hills)
- Running time: 113 minutes
- Country: United States
- Language: English
- Budget: $1.1 million
- Box office: $1.9 million (US rentals)

Cyrano de Bergerac is a 1950 American adventure-romance film based on the 1897 French alexandrine drama Cyrano de Bergerac by Edmond Rostand. It uses poet Brian Hooker's 1923 English blank-verse translation as the basis for its screenplay. The film was the first film version in English of Rostand's play, although there had been several previous film adaptations in various languages.

The film was produced by Stanley Kramer and directed by Michael Gordon. José Ferrer received the Academy Award for Best Actor for his performance as Cyrano de Bergerac.

The film lapsed into the public domain in the mid-1980s. In 2022, the film was selected for preservation in the United States National Film Registry by the Library of Congress as being "culturally, historically or aesthetically significant".

== Plot ==
Cyrano de Bergerac (1950)

In seventeenth-century Paris, poet and master swordsman Cyrano de Bergerac stops a play from being performed because he had previously banned the principal actor, Montfleury, from the stage for a month. Annoyed aristocrat Vicomte de Valvert provokes Cyrano into a duel by insulting Cyrano's enormous nose. Cyrano composes a ballade for the duel and recites it during the sword fight. With the last line, he fatally stabs Valvert.

Cyrano's friend Le Bret warns him that he has made powerful enemies of his victim's friends, but Cyrano is unconcerned. When Le Bret presses him for the real reason why he hates Montfleury, Cyrano admits that he became jealous when he saw Montfleury smiling at his beautiful cousin Roxane. He confesses that although he is in love with her, he harbors no hope of romance because of his nose. Roxane requests to see Cyrano in the morning, which finally gives him hope.

Pastry chef and fellow poet Ragueneau approaches Cyrano for help. Ragueneau has learned that the Comte De Guiche, a nobleman whom he had mocked with his verses, has hired a hundred ruffians to teach him a lesson. Cyrano escorts him, kills eight of the horde and drives off the rest.

The next day, before he can tell Roxane of his feelings, she informs him that she has fallen in love with guardsman Christian de Neuvillette, although she has never spoken to him. Cyrano hides his devastation and agrees to help her.

Cyrano befriends Christian and discovers that he is infatuated with Roxane but is too inept with words to woo her. To help him, Cyrano composes Christian's love letters to Roxane, which she finds irresistible. Christian wants no more help and tries to speak to Roxane directly, but he fails miserably and she returns home in an angry huff. Cyrano, hiding in the bushes, comes to his rescue, but this time by imitating Christian's voice and speaking to Roxane from under her balcony. He is so eloquent that he wins Roxane's heart for Christian.

When the arrogant De Guiche, who is also wooing Roxane, pressures her to marry him, Cyrano delays him long enough for her to wed Christian instead. Furious, De Guiche, Christian's commander, orders him to join his unit immediately for a war against Spain, preventing the couple from spending their wedding night together.

With Cyrano under his command as well, De Guiche earns Cyrano's respect by his conduct in the war. From the field, Cyrano sends Roxane letters every day, supposedly written by Christian. Roxane visits her husband in camp and tells him that she now has fallen in love with him not merely for his looks but because of his words, and that she would love him even if he were ugly. Realizing that she really loves Cyrano, Christian coaxes his rival to agree to tell Roxane the truth and let her decide between them. But before the opportunity arises, Christian volunteers for a dangerous mission and is fatally wounded, silencing Cyrano.

Roxane enters a convent in mourning. Years pass, with Cyrano visiting Roxane weekly, having retired from the military and writing satirical articles mocking the nobility. De Guiche, who has also befriended her and has come to respect Cyrano, overhears a courtier plotting against Cyrano. De Guiche warns Roxane that Cyrano's life may be in danger. One night, Cyrano is lured into an ambush and is trampled by a carriage. Near death, he hides his injuries and visits with Roxane for the last time. His secret love for her is finally revealed when he recites from memory the last of his love letters, which she has kept. However, it is too late, as Cyrano first slips into delirium before dying, leaving Roxane to mourn a second time.

== Cast ==
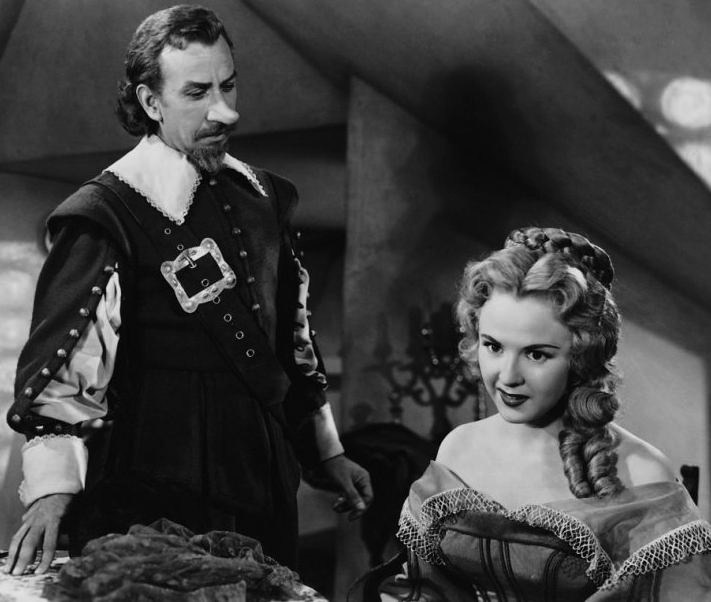
José Ferrer and Mala Powers

- José Ferrer as Cyrano de Bergerac
- Mala Powers as Roxane
- William Prince as Christian de Neuvillette
- Morris Carnovsky as Le Bret
- Ralph Clanton as Antoine, Comte de Guiche
- Lloyd Corrigan as Ragueneau
- Virginia Farmer as Roxane's duenna
- Edgar Barrier as Cardinal Richelieu
- Elena Verdugo as the Orange Girl
- Albert Cavens as the Viscount de Valvert
- Arthur Blake as Montfleury
- Don Beddoe as The Meddler
- Percy Helton as Bellerose
- Francis Pierlot as Monk
- Virginia Christine as Sister Marthe

Ferrer and Ralph Clanton had previously appeared in the 1946 Broadway revival of the play in the same roles that they play in the film.

== Production ==
Producer Stanley Kramer's first choice for the role of Roxane was Elizabeth Taylor, who was unavailable. Arlene Dahl was also considered for the role, which was ultimately awarded to Mala Powers in May 1950. Charles Laughton was considered for the role of Montfleury.

Ferrer, who had played Cyrano on Broadway, also portrayed the character in an installment of The Philco Television Playhouse on January 23, 1949.

To reduce the film's shooting schedule to 30 days, a full set rehearsal was held for 10 days before the cameras rolled.

Production designer Rudolph Sternad created mobile sets on wheels that could be easily moved with minimal effort. This innovation allowed the production to use half the amount of studio space and reduced the setup time for new scenes. Although a similar approach had been tried for television programs, it had never been employed for a motion picture of the scale and complexity of Cyrano de Bergerac.

Director Michael Gordon compiled a collection of photographs of previous actors' portrayals of Cyrano in order to accurately depict the character's signature nose. Plastic surgeon Harold M. Holden, who had recently written a book titled Noses that examined the psychological effect of the nose, was hired as a technical adviser. Two prosthetic noses were used for each day of filming, and each took six hours to create, using a gallon of grain alcohol and plastic substance, and 45 minutes to apply to José Ferrer's face.

Although Cyrano is killed by a falling log in the play, the producers of the film found that it played like slapstick comedy when photographed, so the manner of his death was changed to a trampling by carriage.

== Release ==
José Ferrer embarked on a five-week, 12-city promotional tour in advance of the film's release. He hoped to change the public's perception of the tale, saying: "Audiences are likely to be timid about a classic. I know this from past experience on the stage. They have so much respect for Shakespeare, for instance, that they are almost afraid to laugh at his comedy."

Cyrano de Bergerac was afforded a lavish world premiere at the Fine Arts Theatre in Beverly Hills, California on November 20, 1950.

The film recorded a loss of $300,000. On review aggregator website Rotten Tomatoes, Cyrano de Bergerac holds a score of 75% from 28 reviews, with an average rating of 7/10.

== Reception ==
In a contemporary review for The New York Times, critic Bosley Crowther wrote: "Mr. Ferrer plays Cyrano in a style that is in the theatrical tradition of gesture and eloquence. He speaks the poetry of Rostand with richness and clarity such as only a few other actors have managed on the screen. He bears himself proudly and nobly. He duels with decisiveness. And he carries off the maudlin romanaics [sic] of the play with remarkable grace. For all who are soft to the enchantments of Cyrano and sentiment, he's their man."

Critic Edwin Schallert of the Los Angeles Times called the film "a remarkable experiment in film-making" and wrote: "Re-creating this stage classic is definitely a gain for the film medium. It is remarkably and engrossingly transcribed. Such a scene of action as the duel between Cyrano and the hundred men classes as terrific. The revel of words and fanciful thoughts is amazingly conveyed by the picture's primary actor."

Variety stated that "Michael Gordon's direction doesn't always fulfill the romantic, tragic, comedic and action possibilities, but permits a number of players to account for solid moments in a story that, essentially, belongs to one performer, Ferrer."

Time called Ferrer "the very embodiment of Rostand's self-sacrificing, self-dramatizing hero" while deriding the play's "soft core of unblushing sentiment, unstinted gallantry, unending heroics".

== Awards ==
José Ferrer became the first actor to receive an Academy Award and a Tony Award for the same role.

| Award | Category | Nominee(s) | Result |
|---|---|---|---|
| Academy Awards | Best Actor | José Ferrer | Won |
| Directors Guild of America Awards | Outstanding Directorial Achievement in Motion Pictures | Michael Gordon | Nominated |
| Golden Globe Awards | Best Motion Picture – Drama | | Nominated |
| Golden Globe Awards | Best Actor in a Motion Picture – Drama | José Ferrer | Won |
| Golden Globe Awards | Most Promising Newcomer | Mala Powers | Nominated |
| Golden Globe Awards | Best Cinematography – Black and White | Franz Planer | Won |
| National Board of Review Awards | Top Ten Films | | 8th Place |
| New York Film Critics Circle Awards | Best Actor | José Ferrer | Nominated |

== See also ==
- List of films in the public domain in the United States
