= Sunset Boulevard (film) =

1950 film by Billy Wilder

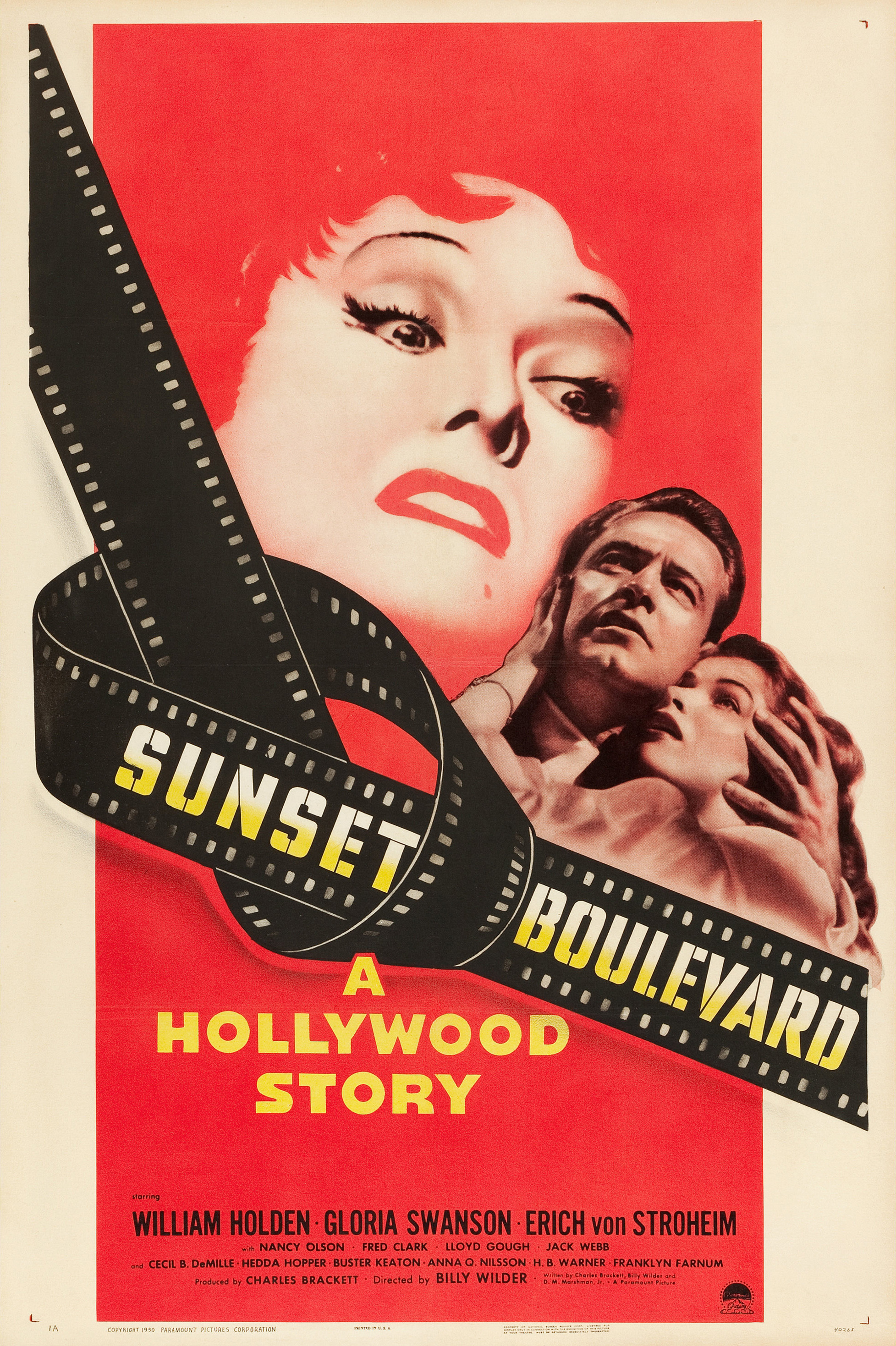
- Theatrical release poster
- Directed by: Billy Wilder
- Written by: Charles Brackett; Billy Wilder; D. M. Marshman Jr.
- Produced by: Charles Brackett
- Starring: William Holden; Gloria Swanson; Erich von Stroheim; Nancy Olson; Fred Clark; Lloyd Gough; Jack Webb
- Cinematography: John F. Seitz
- Edited by: Doane Harrison; Arthur Schmidt
- Music by: Franz Waxman
- Production company: Paramount Pictures
- Distributed by: Paramount Pictures
- Release date: August 10, 1950
- Running time: 110 minutes
- Country: United States
- Language: English
- Budget: $1.75 million
- Box office: $5 million

Sunset Boulevard is a 1950 American black comedy film noir directed by Billy Wilder and co-written by Wilder, Charles Brackett, and D. M. Marshman Jr. It is named after a major street that runs through Hollywood and western Los Angeles.

The film stars William Holden as Joe Gillis, a struggling screenwriter, and Gloria Swanson as Norma Desmond, a former silent film star who hires him to revise a screenplay she believes will enable her return to the screen. Erich von Stroheim plays Max von Mayerling, her devoted butler, and Nancy Olson, Jack Webb, Lloyd Gough, and Fred Clark appear in supporting roles. Director Cecil B. DeMille and gossip columnist Hedda Hopper play themselves, and the film includes cameo appearances by silent film stars Buster Keaton, H. B. Warner, and Anna Q. Nilsson.

Praised by many critics when first released, Sunset Boulevard was nominated for 11 Academy Awards, including nominations in all four acting categories, and won three. It is considered one of the greatest films in history. As it was deemed "culturally, historically, or aesthetically significant" by the US Library of Congress in 1989, Sunset Boulevard was included in the first group of films selected for preservation in the National Film Registry. In 1998, it was ranked number 12 on the American Film Institute's list of the 100 best American films of the 20th century; in 2007, it was ranked 16th on their updated 10th Anniversary list.

== Plot ==
At a mansion on Sunset Boulevard, police officers and photographers discover the body of Joe Gillis floating face down in the swimming pool. In a flashback, Joe relates the events leading to his death.

Six months earlier, Joe, a down-on-his-luck screenwriter, tries to interest Paramount Pictures in a story he submitted. Script reader Betty Schaefer harshly criticizes it, unaware that Joe is listening. Later, while fleeing from repo men seeking his car, Joe turns into the driveway of a seemingly deserted mansion inhabited by forgotten silent film star Norma Desmond. Eventually recognizing her, Joe says, "You're Norma Desmond. You used to be in silent pictures. You used to be big." Norma replies, "I am big, it's the pictures that got small!"

Learning that Joe is a writer, Norma asks his opinion of a script she has written for a film about Salome. She plans to play the role herself in her return to the screen. Although Joe considers the script poor, he praises it to persuade Norma to hire him as a script doctor.

Joe moves into Norma's mansion at her insistence and sees that Norma refuses to believe that her fame has evaporated. Her butler, Max, secretly writes all of the fan mail she receives to maintain the illusion. At her New Year's Eve party, where she, Joe, and Max are the only attendees, Joe realizes that she has fallen in love with him. He tries to let her down gently, but Norma slaps him and retreats to her room, distraught. Joe visits his friend Artie Green and again meets Betty, who thinks a scene in one of Joe's scripts has potential. When he phones Max to have him pack his things, Max tells him Norma has cut her wrists with his razor. Joe then returns to Norma, and their relationship becomes sexual.

Norma has Max deliver the edited Salome script to her former director Cecil B. DeMille at Paramount. She starts getting calls from Paramount executive Gordon Cole, but refuses to speak to anyone except DeMille. Eventually, she has Max drive Joe and her to Paramount in her 1929 Isotta Fraschini. DeMille welcomes her affectionately and treats her with great respect, but tactfully evades her questions about the script. Max then learns that Cole only called her because he wants to rent her Isotta Fraschini for use in a movie.

Preparing for her imagined comeback, Norma undergoes rigorous beauty treatments. Joe secretly works nights in Betty's office, collaborating on an original screenplay, and she eventually confesses she has fallen for him. After learning of Joe's moonlighting, Max reveals he was once a respected film director who discovered Norma, made her a star, and became her first husband. Following their divorce, he abandoned his career to become her servant.

Norma discovers a manuscript with Joe and Betty's names on it and phones Betty, insinuating that Joe is not the man he seems. Overhearing the call, Joe invites Betty to the mansion to see for herself. When she arrives, he pretends that he is satisfied being a gigolo so that she can be with Artie. However, after she tearfully leaves, he packs to return to his old newspaper job in Dayton, Ohio. He bluntly informs Norma that there will be no comeback, that Max writes all of her fan mail, and that she has been forgotten, though Max refuses to break her delusions. Joe disregards Norma's threat to kill herself as she brandishes a gun; as he leaves the house, Norma shoots him, and he collapses into the pool.

The flashback ends, and the film returns to the present day, with Norma about to be arrested for murder. The mansion is overrun with police and reporters with newsreel cameras, which she believes are movie cameras. Max pretends to "direct" her, and the police play along. As the cameras roll, Norma descends the grand staircase. Upon reaching the bottom, she stops and makes an impromptu speech about how happy she is to be making a film again. She then says, "All right, Mr. DeMille, I'm ready for my close-up," and approaches the camera.

== Cast ==
- William Holden as Joe Gillis (Joseph C. Gillis)
- Gloria Swanson as Norma Desmond
- Erich von Stroheim as Max von Mayerling
- Nancy Olson as Betty Schaefer
- Fred Clark as Sheldrake, film producer
- Lloyd Gough as Morino, Joe's agent
- Jack Webb as Artie Green
- Franklyn Farnum as undertaker
- Larry J. Blake as finance man #1
- Charles Dayton as finance man #2
- Jack Warden as New Year's Eve party guest
- Cecil B. DeMille as himself
- Hedda Hopper as herself
- Sidney Skolsky as himself
- Buster Keaton as himself (bridge player)
- Anna Q. Nilsson as herself (bridge player)
- H. B. Warner as himself (bridge player)
- Ray Evans as a pianist at Artie's party
- Jay Livingston as a pianist at Artie's party
- Henry Wilcoxon as actor on DeMille's Samson and Delilah set
- Robert O'Connor as Jonesy, an older guard at the Paramount gate

== Production ==
=== Background ===
Sunset Boulevard in Los Angeles has been associated with Hollywood film production since 1911, when the town's first film studio, Nestor, opened there. Film workers lived modestly in the growing neighborhood, but during the 1920s, profits and salaries rose to unprecedented levels. With the advent of the star system, luxurious homes noted for their often incongruous grandeur were built in the area.

In 1999 interview with Cameron Crow, Wilder recalled that the project began as a comedy, possibly starring Mae West, before developing into a story about a silent-film star and a screenwriter.

The character of Norma Desmond mirrors aspects of the later lives of several former silent-film stars, such as the reclusive existences of Mary Pickford and Pola Negri and the mental-health struggles of Mae Murray, Valeska Surratt, Audrey Munson, and Clara Bow. Critic Dave Kehr has asserted that Norma Talmadge is "the obvious if unacknowledged source of Norma Desmond, the grotesque, predatory silent movie queen". The most common analysis of the character's name is that it is a combination of the names of silent film actress Mabel Normand and director William Desmond Taylor, a close friend of Normand's who was murdered in 1922 in a never-solved case sensationalized by the press. However, screenplay co-author Marshman insisted the character's name was a combination of actresses Norma Talmadge and Florence Desmond.

=== Writing ===
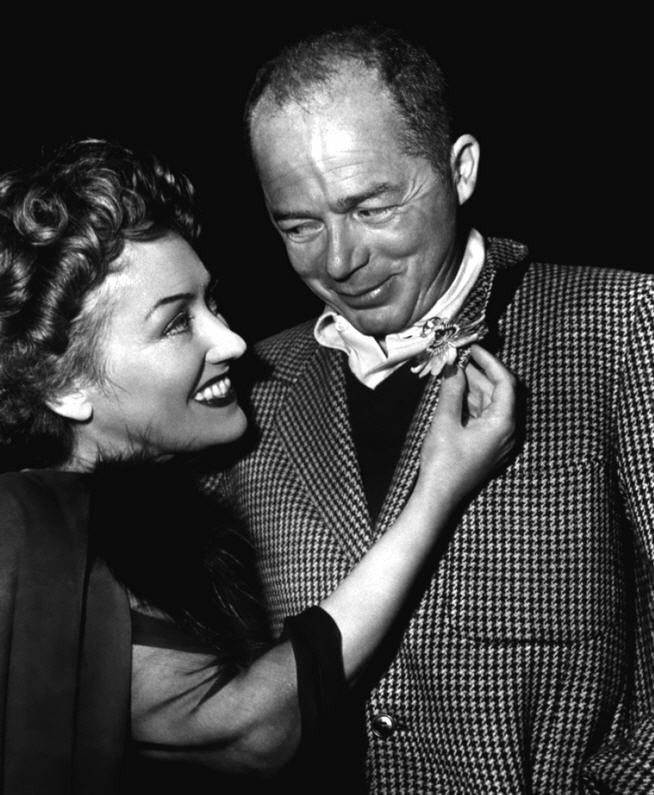
Gloria Swanson and Billy Wilder

Cinematographer John F. Seitz stated that Wilder "had wanted to do Evelyn Waugh's 1948 novel The Loved One, but couldn't obtain the rights." Waugh's story follows Dennis Barlow, a young British poet who is working at a Hollywood pet mortuary. His housemate is Sir Francis Hinsley, an aging screenwriter who has not written anything in years. When Sir Francis is unceremoniously let go by the studio, he hangs himself, and funeral arrangements are left to Barlow. Gossip columnist Hedda Hopper, who plays herself in the movie, wrote, "Billy Wilder ... was crazy about Evelyn Waugh's book The Loved One, and the studio wanted to buy it." Regardless, the plans for this adaptation fell through. The original script that followed nevertheless contains similarities to the novel. At one point, Norma mistakes Joe for a funeral director and inquires about a coffin for herself and her deceased pet chimpanzee.

Wilder and Brackett began working on a script in 1948, but the result did not completely satisfy them. In August 1948, D. M. Marshman Jr., formerly a writer for Life, was hired to help develop the storyline after Wilder and Brackett were impressed by a critique he provided of their film The Emperor Waltz (1948). To keep the full details of the story from Paramount Pictures and avoid the restrictive censorship of the Hays Code, they submitted the script a few pages at a time. The Breen Office insisted certain lines be rewritten, such as Gillis's "I'm up that creek and I need a job," which became "I'm over a barrel. I need a job." Paramount executives thought Wilder was adapting a story called A Can of Beans (which did not exist) and allowed him relative freedom to proceed as he saw fit. Only the first third of the script was written when filming began in early May 1949, and Wilder was unsure how the film would end.

The fusion of writer-director Billy Wilder's biting humor and the classic elements of film noir make for a strange kind of comedy, as well as a strange kind of film noir. There are no belly laughs here, but there are certainly strangled giggles: at the pet chimp's midnight funeral, at Joe's discomfited acquiescence to the role of gigolo; at Norma's Mack Sennett-style "entertainments" for her uneasy lover; and at the ritualized solemnity of Norma's "waxworks" card parties, which feature such former luminaries as Buster Keaton as Norma's has-been cronies.

Wilder preferred to leave analyses of his screenplays and films to others. When asked if Sunset Boulevard was a black comedy, he replied: "No, just a picture".

=== Casting ===
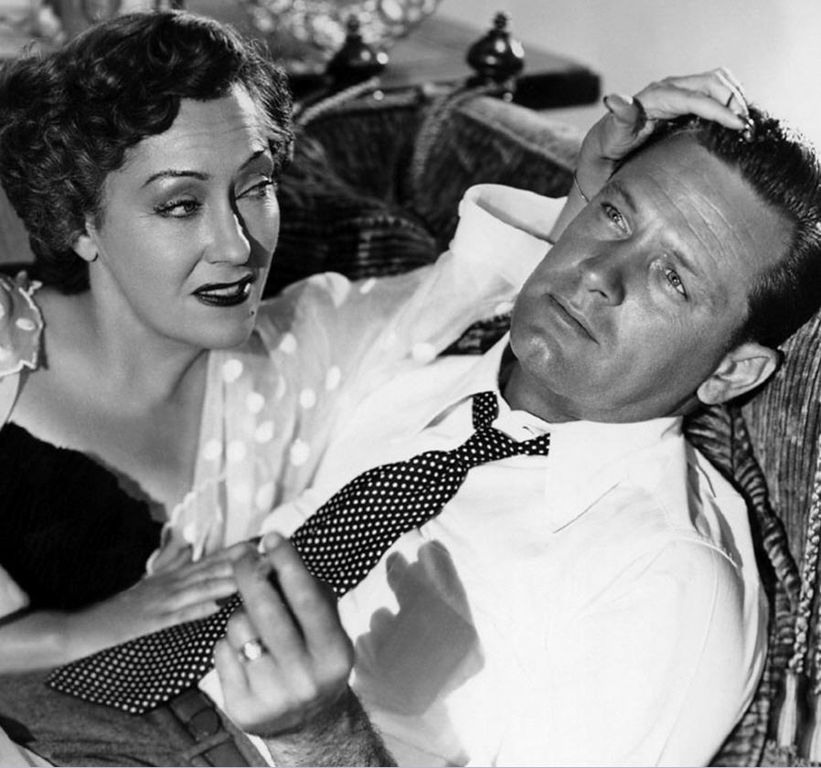
Wilder considered many actors for the lead roles, but chose Swanson and Holden.

According to Brackett, Wilder and he never considered anyone except Gloria Swanson for the role of Norma Desmond. Wilder, however, recalled first wanting Mae West and Marlon Brando for the leads. West rejected the offer outright; she continued to portray herself as a sex symbol through her senior years, and was offended that she should be asked to play a Hollywood has-been.

The filmmakers approached Greta Garbo, with whom they had worked previously on Ninotchka (1939), but she was not interested. Wilder contacted Pola Negri by telephone, but had a difficult time understanding her heavy Polish accent. He then reached out to Clara Bow, the famed "It girl" of the 1920s, but she declined, having found the transition to sound films so difficult that she preferred to leave her film career behind her. They also offered the part of Norma Desmond to Norma Shearer, but she rejected the role due to both her retirement and distaste for the script. They were considering Fred MacMurray to play opposite her as Joe. Wilder and Brackett then visited Mary Pickford, but before even discussing the plot with her, Wilder realized she would consider a role involving an affair with a man half her age an insult, so they departed. They had considered pairing Montgomery Clift with her.

According to Wilder, George Cukor then suggested Swanson, one of the most fêted actresses of the silent era, known for her beauty, talent, and extravagant lifestyle. The similarities ended there; Swanson made a handful of sound films. She accepted the end of her film career, and in the early 1930s, moved to New York City, where she worked in radio. In the mid-1940s, she worked in television and on the New York stage and had last appeared in the 1941 film Father Takes a Wife. Though Swanson was not seeking a movie comeback, she became intrigued when Wilder discussed the role with her.

Swanson was glad for the opportunity to earn a greater salary than she had been making in television and on stage. However, she was chagrined at the notion of submitting to a screen test, saying she had "made 20 films for Paramount. Why do they want me to audition?" Her reaction was echoed in the screenplay when Norma Desmond declares that "Without me, there wouldn't be any Paramount studios." In her memoir, Swanson recalled asking Cukor if it was unreasonable to refuse the screen test. He replied that since Norma Desmond was the role for which she would be remembered, "If they ask you to do ten screen tests, do ten screen tests, or I will personally shoot you." This convinced Swanson to participate, and she signed a contract for $50,000 (equivalent to $670,000 in 2025). In a 1975 interview, Wilder recalled Swanson's reaction with the observation, "There was a lot of Norma in her, you know."

Wilder harks back to Swanson's silent-film career when Norma shows Joe the film Queen Kelly (1929), starring Swanson and directed by Erich von Stroheim, who himself portrays Norma's former director and husband Max von Mayerling. Queen Kelly was not released in the United States for over 50 years after Swanson walked off the set.

Montgomery Clift was signed to play Joe Gillis for $5,000 per week for a guaranteed 12 weeks, but withdrew just before the start of filming, claiming his role of a young man involved with an older woman was too close to the one he had played in The Heiress (1949), in which he felt he had been unconvincing. An infuriated Wilder responded, "If he's any kind of actor, he could be convincing making love to any woman." Clift himself was having an affair with singer Libby Holman, 15 years his senior, which some have suggested was his real reason for withdrawing from the film.

Forced to consider the available Paramount contract players, Wilder and Brackett focused on William Holden, who had made an impressive debut a decade earlier in Golden Boy (1939). Following an appearance in Our Town (1940), he served in the military in World War II, and his return to the screen afterward had been moderately successful. Holden was enthusiastic about the script and eager to accept the role. He did not know at the time that his salary of $39,000 (equivalent to $520,000 in 2025) was much less than had been offered to Clift.

For the role of Betty Schaefer, Wilder wanted a newcomer who could project a wholesome and ordinary image to contrast with Swanson's flamboyant and obsessive Desmond. He chose Nancy Olson, who had recently been considered for the role of Delilah in Cecil B. DeMille's Samson and Delilah.

DeMille, often credited as the person most responsible for making Swanson a star, plays himself, with his scenes filmed on the set of Samson and Delilah at Paramount Studios. He calls Norma "young fella", which had been his nickname for Swanson.

Norma's friends who come to play bridge with her, referred to by Joe as "the waxworks", were Swanson's silent-era contemporaries Buster Keaton, Anna Q. Nilsson, and H. B. Warner, portraying themselves. Gossip columnist Hedda Hopper also played herself, reporting on Norma Desmond's downfall in the film's final scenes.

=== Cinematography and design ===
The film's dark, shadowy black-and-white cinematography was the work of John F. Seitz. Wilder had worked with Seitz on several projects before, and trusted his judgment, allowing him to make his own decisions. Seitz recalled asking Wilder what he required for the pet chimpanzee's funeral scene, to which Wilder replied, "you know, just your standard monkey funeral shot." For some interior shots, Seitz sprinkled dust in front of the camera before filming to suggest "mustiness," a technique he had also used for Wilder's Double Indemnity (1944). The film had the option to be shot in color, but it was instead shot in black and white to be more reflective of the noir genre as well as contribute to the psychologically dark atmosphere of the film.

Trailer for the film

Wilder was adamant that the corpse of Joe Gillis be seen from the bottom of the pool, but creating the effect was difficult. The camera was placed inside a specially constructed box and lowered under water, but the result disappointed Wilder, who insisted on further experiments. The shot was finally achieved by placing a mirror on the bottom of the pool and filming Holden's reflection from above, with the distorted image of the police officers standing around the pool forming a backdrop.

Film historian Tom Stempel writes: "In both Double Indemnity and Sunset Boulevard, Seitz does something that has always impressed me. Both are films noir, and he finesses the fact that both are set in the sunniest of locales, Los Angeles... he brings together the light and the dark in the same film without any seams showing... he brings together the realistic lighting of Joe Gillis out in the real world with the gothic look of Norma Desmond's mansion."

Edith Head designed the costumes. Wilder, Head, and Swanson agreed that Norma Desmond would have kept somewhat up-to-date with fashion trends, so Head designed costumes closely resembling the Dior look of the mid-1940s. Embellishments were added to personalize them and reflect Norma Desmond's taste.

Swanson recalled in her biography that the costumes were only "a trifle outdated, a trifle exotic." Head later described her assignment as "the most challenging of my career," and explained her approach: "Because Norma Desmond was an actress who had become lost in her own imagination, I tried to make her look like she was always impersonating someone." Head later said she relied on Swanson's expertise because "she was creating a past that she knew and I didn't." Head also designed costumes for William Holden and the minor characters, but Wilder instructed von Stroheim and Nancy Olson to wear their own clothing.

The overstated decadence of Norma Desmond's home was created by set designer Hans Dreier, whose career extended back to the silent era. He had also been commissioned to complete the interior design for the homes of movie stars, including the house of Mae West. William Haines, an interior designer and former actor, later rebutted criticism of Dreier's set design with the observation, "Bebe Daniels, Norma Shearer, and Pola Negri all had homes with ugly interiors like that."

The bed in the shape of a boat in which Norma Desmond slept had been owned by dancer Gaby Deslys, who died in 1920. It had originally been bought by the Universal prop department at auction after Deslys's death. The bed appeared in The Phantom of the Opera (1925) starring Lon Chaney.

Wilder also made use of authentic locales. Joe's apartment is in the Alto Nido, a real apartment block in central Hollywood that was often home to struggling writers. It is located at 1851 Ivar Ave. and Franklin Ave. west of the Hollywood Freeway. The scenes of Gillis and Betty Schaefer on Paramount's back lot were filmed on the actual studio back lot, and the interior of Schwab's Drug Store was carefully recreated for several scenes. The exterior scenes of the Desmond house were filmed at a house on Wilshire Boulevard built during the 1920s by the millionaire William O. Jenkins, who with his family had lived in it for only one year before then leaving it abandoned for more than a decade, which earned it the nickname "Phantom House". By 1949, it was owned by the former wife of J. Paul Getty. The house was later featured in Nicholas Ray's Rebel Without a Cause (1955). It was demolished by the Gettys in 1957 to make way for the construction of an office building.

During filming, considerable publicity was given to the health-conscious Gloria Swanson's youthful appearance, which made her look the same age as Holden. Wilder insisted that the age difference between the characters be delineated, and instructed makeup supervisor Wally Westmore to make Swanson look older. Swanson argued that a woman of Norma Desmond's age, with her considerable wealth and devotion to self, would not necessarily look old, and suggested Holden be made up to appear younger. Wilder agreed, and Westmore was assigned this task, which allowed Swanson to portray Norma Desmond as more glamorous a figure than Wilder had originally imagined.

== Score ==
Franz Waxman's musical score was the final element added to Sunset Boulevard. His theme for Norma was based on tango music, inspired by her having danced the tango with Rudolph Valentino. This style was contrasted with Joe's bebop theme. Waxman also used distorted arrangements of popular film-music styles from the 1920s and 1930s to suggest Norma Desmond's state of mind. The film's score was recorded for compact disc by the Royal Scottish National Orchestra, conducted by Joel McNeely, and released in 2002. The surviving parts of the original score were released in 2010.

A suite from the film's score, as well as an arrangement by the conductor John Mauceri of various cues in sonata form, are published by Sony Music.

== Themes ==
=== Fame and the decline of silent film ===
Film scholar Grayson Cooke interprets Sunset Boulevard as an examination of the relationship between face and film. Cooke looks at the Hollywood's star system and its emphasis on youth, beauty, and the female star's face leads to the commodification of actors and actresses appearances. He argues how the film explores how stars' images are produced and marketed through their appearances. with Norma Desmond remaining attached to the screen image of her younger self.

Cooke also examines the reoccurrence of ghostlike imagery throughout the film to argue how the star system results in the turnover of film stars which creates "ghosts". The film itself is narrated by a ghost as Joe Gillis' shares his story after he is seen floating dead in the pool at the beginning of the film. Cooke also examines Norma's decaying mansion as an example of how ghosts of the past continue to exist in the future. Her mansion initially seems abandoned due to its unkept state. Upon entering the house, the audience can see photographs and portraits of Norma from during her past fame. He interprets these photographs and memorabilia surrounding Norma and Max as remnants of silent-era Hollywood that separate them from the contemporary world. Additionally, these memorabilia act as ghosts from Norma's youth and past fame haunting her current self. The idea of ghosts throughout the film illustrate how the introduction of sound into Hollywood result in the silent film actors were replaced by the sound industry.

Film scholar Aaron Taylor analyzes Gloria Swanson's portrayal of Norma through the conventions of melodramatic villainy. He argues that viewers can appreciate Swanson's acting skill and theatrical performance while finding enjoyment in her portrayal of the character's villainy.

=== Reality and illusion ===
Joan F. Dean argues that the film blurs the distinction between reality and illusion through its casting. She connects its impact to the appearances of silent-era performers as themselves and to the parallels between Gloria Swanson's career and Norma Desmond's fictional history.

== Original release and responses ==
=== Previews and revision ===
Wilder and Brackett, nervous about a major screening in Hollywood, held a preview screening in Evanston, Illinois, in late 1949. The original edit opened with a scene inside a morgue, with the assembled corpses discussing how they came to be there. The story began with the corpse of Joe Gillis recounting his murder to the others. The audience reacted with laughter and seemed unsure whether to view the rest of the film as drama or comedy. After a similar reaction during its second screening in Poughkeepsie, New York, and a third in Great Neck, the morgue opening was replaced by a shorter poolside opening, using footage filmed on January 5, 1950.

In Hollywood, Paramount arranged a private screening for the various studio heads and specially invited guests. After viewing the film, Barbara Stanwyck knelt to kiss the hem of Gloria Swanson's skirt. Swanson later remembered looking for Mary Pickford, only to be told, "She can't show herself, Gloria. She's too overcome. We all are." Louis B. Mayer berated Wilder before the crowd of celebrities, saying, "You have disgraced the industry that made and fed you! You should be tarred and feathered and run out of Hollywood!" Upon hearing of Mayer's slight, Wilder strode up to the mogul and retorted with a vulgarity that one biographer said was allegedly because Mayer, who was Jewish, suggested that Wilder, who was also Jewish, would be better off being sent back to Germany, an extraordinary sentiment so soon after the war and the Holocaust, in which Wilder's family perished. In 2020, Olson recounted that friends who had attended the screening told her that Wilder had simply told Mayer, "Go fuck yourself."

The few other criticisms were not so venomous. According to one often-told but later discredited anecdote, actress Mae Murray, a contemporary of Swanson's, was offended by the film and commented, "None of us floozies was that nuts."

=== Premiere and box-office receipts ===
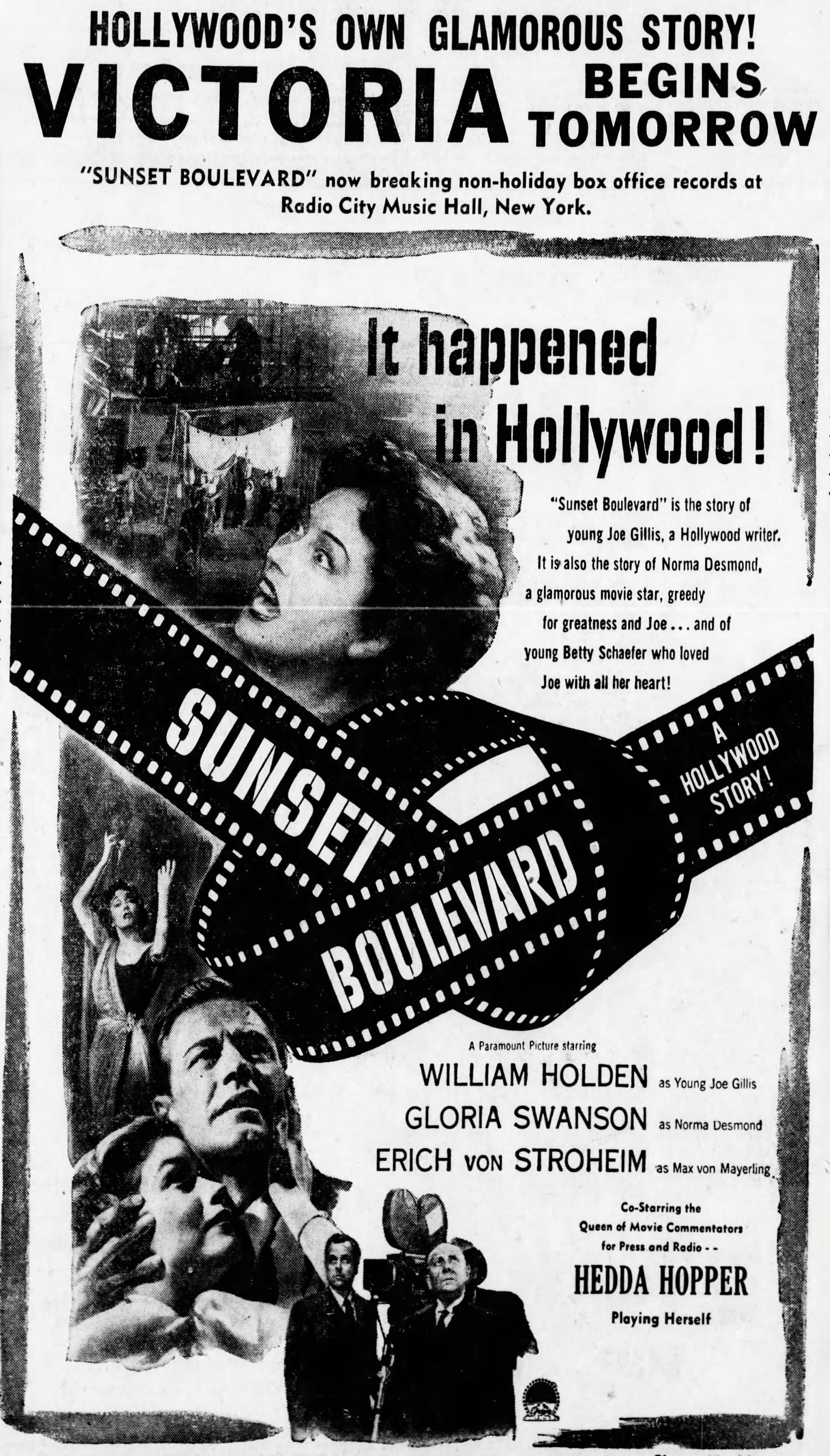
Theatrical advertisement from 1950

Sunset Boulevard had its official world premiere at Radio City Music Hall on August 10, 1950. After a seven-week run, Variety reported the film had grossed "around $1,020,000", ($13,649,378 in 2025 dollars) making it one of that theater's most successful pictures. Variety also noted that while it was "breaking records in major cities, it is doing below average in ... the sticks." To promote the film, Gloria Swanson traveled by train throughout the United States, visiting 33 cities in a few months. The publicity helped attract people to the cinemas, but in many areas away from major cities, it was considered less than a hit.

The film earned an estimated $2,350,000 at the US box office in 1950 ($31,447,095 in 2025 dollars).

=== Critical response ===
Review aggregator Rotten Tomatoes reports that 98% of critics gave the film a positive review based on 125 reviews, with an average rating of 9.5/10. The critical consensus states: "Arguably the greatest movie about Hollywood, Billy Wilder's masterpiece Sunset Boulevard is a tremendously entertaining combination of noir, black comedy, and character study." On Metacritic, the film has a weighted average score of 94 out of 100, based on 32 critics, indicating "universal acclaim".

==== Contemporary ====
Sunset Boulevard attracted a range of positive reviews from critics. Time described it as a story of "Hollywood at its worst told by Hollywood at its best", while Boxoffice Review wrote "the picture will keep spectators spellbound." James Agee, writing for Sight and Sound, praised the film and said Wilder and Brackett were "beautifully equipped to do the cold, exact, adroit, sardonic job they have done." He further stated: "There is no use pretending to discuss all the virtues, or even all the limitations, of this picture: it is one of those rare movies which are so full of exactness, cleverness, mastery, pleasure, and arguable and unarguable choice and judgment, that they can be talked about...for hours on end. The people of the present and their world are handled with a grimly controlled, mock-easy exactness which seems about as good as a certain kind of modified movie naturalism can get; this exactness is also imposed on the obsoletes and their world, but with that exactness they are treated always, with fine imaginativeness and eloquence, as heroic grotesques." Good Housekeeping described Swanson as a "great lady [who] spans another decade with her magic," while Look praised her "brilliant and haunting performance."

Some critics accurately foresaw the film's lasting appeal. The Hollywood Reporter wrote that future generations would "set themselves the task of analyzing the durability and greatness" of the film, while Commonweal said that in the future "the Library of Congress will be glad to have in its archives a print of Sunset Boulevard."

In a negative review, The New Yorker deemed it "a pretentious slice of Roquefort" containing only "the germ of a good idea". Despite praising it as a "great motion picture" with "memorable" acting, Thomas M. Pryor wrote in The New York Times that the use of the dead Joe Gillis as narrator was a plot device "completely unworthy of Brackett and Wilder".

==== Retrospective ====
In 1999, Roger Ebert described Swanson as giving "one of the all time greatest [acting] performances", but singled out von Stroheim's performance as "hold[ing] the film together". He included it in his Great Movies list, calling it "the best drama ever made about the movies because it sees through the illusions." Pauline Kael described the film as "almost too clever, but at its best in its cleverness", and also wrote that it was common to "hear Billy Wilder called the world's greatest director." When Wilder died in 2002, obituaries singled out Sunset Boulevard for comment, describing it as one of his most significant works, along with Double Indemnity and Some Like It Hot. Leslie Halliwell gave it three of four stars, stating: "Incisive melodrama with marvelous moments but a tendency to overstay its welcome ... though the last scene is worth waiting for and the malicious observation throughout is a treat."

Film writer Richard Corliss describes Sunset Boulevard as "the definitive Hollywood horror movie", noting that almost everything in the script is "ghoulish". He remarks that the story is narrated by a dead man whom Norma Desmond first mistakes for an undertaker, while most of the film takes place "in an old, dark house that only opens its doors to the living dead". He compares von Stroheim's character Max with the concealed Erik, the central character in The Phantom of the Opera, and Norma Desmond with Dracula, noting that, as she seduces Joe Gillis, the camera tactfully withdraws with "the traditional directorial attitude taken towards Dracula's jugular seductions". He writes that the narrative contains an excess of "cheap sarcasm", but ultimately considers it a valuable part of Joe's characterization as a hack writer. David Thomson notes the irony of having Gillis tell the story: "The man who can't dream up a viable story line becomes the best pitch he'll ever hear. He is the story and it is Billy Wilder's sour valedictory to let the ghost of Gillis tell the story, facedown in the gelid swimming pool exactly the Hollywood reward that Joe gets only in his dreams. And so this breathtaking portrait of Hollywood failure is wrapped up in rueful, ruined success."

Eddie Muller listed it as one of his Top 25 Noir Films.

In the 2012 Sight and Sound critics poll to determine the greatest films of all time, Sunset Boulevard was ranked in 63rd place, tied with films such as Wild Strawberries, The Night of the Hunter, and Modern Times. In the Sight and Sound 2022 director's poll, the film was ranked in 62nd place, tied with films such Lawrence of Arabia, Late Spring, Meshes of the Afternoon, and Some Like it Hot. In the critic's poll, it was ranked in 78th place.

== Accolades ==
Award	Category	Nominee(s)	Result	Ref.
Academy Awards	Best Motion Picture	Paramount Pictures	Nominated	
Academy Awards	Best Director	Billy Wilder	Nominated	
Academy Awards	Best Actor	William Holden	Nominated	
Academy Awards	Best Actress	Gloria Swanson	Nominated	
Academy Awards	Best Supporting Actor	Erich von Stroheim	Nominated	
Academy Awards	Best Supporting Actress	Nancy Olson	Nominated	
Academy Awards	Best Story and Screenplay	Charles Brackett, Billy Wilder, and D. M. Marshman Jr.	Won	
Academy Awards	Best Art Direction – Black-and-White	Art Direction: Hans Dreier and John Meehan; Set Decoration: Samuel M. Comer and Ray Moyer	Won	
Academy Awards	Best Cinematography – Black-and-White	John F. Seitz	Nominated	
Academy Awards	Best Film Editing	Arthur P. Schmidt and Doane Harrison	Nominated	
Academy Awards	Best Scoring of a Dramatic or Comedy Picture	Franz Waxman	Won	
Blue Ribbon Awards	Best Foreign Film	Billy Wilder	Won	
Bodil Awards	Best American Film	Billy Wilder	Won	
Cahiers du Cinéma	Best Film	Billy Wilder	Nominated	
Directors Guild of America Awards	Outstanding Directorial Achievement in Motion Pictures	Billy Wilder	Nominated	
DVD Exclusive Awards	Best Overall New Extra Features – Library Release	John Barbour (for the "Special Collector's Edition")	Nominated	
Golden Globe Awards	Best Motion Picture – Drama		Won	
Golden Globe Awards	Best Actress in a Motion Picture – Drama	Gloria Swanson	Won	
Golden Globe Awards	Best Supporting Actor – Motion Picture	Erich von Stroheim	Nominated	
Golden Globe Awards	Best Director – Motion Picture	Billy Wilder	Won	
Golden Globe Awards	Best Screenplay – Motion Picture	Charles Brackett, Billy Wilder, and D. M. Marshman Jr.	Nominated	
Golden Globe Awards	Best Original Score – Motion Picture	Franz Waxman	Won	
Golden Globe Awards	Best Cinematography – Black and White	John F. Seitz	Nominated	
Jussi Awards	Best Foreign Actress	Gloria Swanson	Won	
Nastro d'Argento	Best Foreign Director	Billy Wilder	Won	
Nastro d'Argento	Best Foreign Actress	Gloria Swanson	Won	
National Board of Review Awards	Best Film		Won	
National Board of Review Awards	Top Ten Films		Won	
National Board of Review Awards	Best Actress	Gloria Swanson	Won	
National Film Preservation Board	National Film Registry		Inducted	
New York Film Critics Circle Awards	Best Film		Nominated	
New York Film Critics Circle Awards	Best Director	Billy Wilder	Nominated	
New York Film Critics Circle Awards	Best Actress	Gloria Swanson	Nominated	
Online Film & Television Association Awards	Film Hall of Fame: Productions		Inducted	
Picturegoer Awards	Best Actor	William Holden	Nominated	
Picturegoer Awards	Best Actress	Gloria Swanson	Nominated	
Writers Guild of America Awards	Best Written American Drama	Charles Brackett, Billy Wilder, and D. M. Marshman Jr.	Won	

Of the various films that have attracted Academy Award nominations in all four acting categories, Sunset Boulevard is one of only three not to win in any category, the others being My Man Godfrey (1936) and American Hustle (2013). At the time its eleven Oscar nominations were exceeded only by the fourteen received by All About Eve, which won six awards, including Best Picture and Best Director. Many critics predicted that the Best Actress award would be given to Gloria Swanson or Bette Davis for All About Eve and were surprised that the recipient was newcomer Judy Holliday for Born Yesterday. Bette Davis believed that her and Swanson's comparable characters effectively "cancelled each other out", allowing Holliday to win. Swanson recalled the press's reaction following Holliday's win: "It slowly dawned on me that they were asking for a larger-than-life scene, or better still, a mad scene. More accurately, they were trying to flush out Norma Desmond."

Sunset Boulevard was dramatized as an hour-long radio play on the September 17, 1951, broadcast of Lux Radio Theater with Gloria Swanson and William Holden in their original film roles.

=== Recognition since 1989 ===
In 1989, the film was among the first group of 25 deemed "culturally, historically, or aesthetically significant" by the Library of Congress and selected for preservation in the National Film Registry. The Village Voice ranked the film at No. 43 in its Top 250 "Best Films of the Century" list in 1999, based on a poll of critics. The film was included in "The New York Times Guide to the Best 1,000 Movies Ever Made" in 2002. In January 2002, the film was included on the list of the "Top 100 Essential Films of All Time" by the National Society of Film Critics. Sunset Boulevard received 33 votes in the British Film Institute's 2012 Sight & Sound polls, making it the 63rd greatest film of all time in the critics' poll and 67th in the directors' poll. In the earlier 2002 Sight & Sound polls the film ranked 12th among directors. In 2022 edition of Sight & Sound's Greatest films of all time list the film ranked 62nd in the directors' poll. In 2006, the Writers Guild of America ranked the film's screenplay (written by Charles Brackett & Billy Wilder and D.M. Marshman Jr.) the 7th greatest ever. In a 2015 poll by BBC Culture, film critics ranked Sunset Boulevard the 54th greatest American film of all time. The February 2020 issue of New York Magazine lists Sunset Boulevard as among "The Best Movies That Lost Best Picture at the Oscars."

American Film Institute included the film on these lists:

- 1998 – AFI's 100 Years... 100 Movies – #12
- 2005 – AFI's 100 Years... 100 Movie Quotes:
  - "Alright, Mr. DeMille, I'm ready for my close-up." – #7
  - "I am big, it's the pictures that got small!" – #24
- 2005 – AFI's 100 Years of Film Scores – #16
- 2007 – AFI's 100 Years... 100 Movies (10th Anniversary Edition) – #16

== Aftermath ==
Sunset Boulevard was the last collaboration between Wilder and Brackett; they parted amicably and did not publicly air any grievances for the rest of their lives. In later years, Brackett confided in screenwriter/director Garson Kanin that he had not anticipated the split, nor had he ever understood exactly what happened or why. He described it as "an unexpected blow" from which he never recovered fully; when asked to respond to Brackett's comments, Wilder remained silent.

The two men briefly reunited in October 1951 to face charges that they had plagiarized Sunset Boulevard. Former Paramount accountant Stephanie Joan Carlson alleged that in 1947 she had submitted to Wilder and Brackett, at their request, manuscripts of stories, both fictional and based on fact, she had written about studio life. She claimed that one in particular, Past Performance, served as the basis for the Sunset script, and sued the screenwriters and Paramount for $100,000 in general damages, $250,000 in punitive damages, $700,000 based on the box office returns, and an additional $350,000 for good measure, for a total of $1,400,000. Carlson's suit was dismissed after two and a half years. In 1954, a similar suit was filed by playwright Edra Buckler, who claimed material she had written had been the screenplay's source. Her suit was dismissed the following year.

Brackett's Hollywood career continued after his split with Wilder. He won an Academy Award for his screenplay for Titanic (1953), and wrote Niagara (1953), the breakthrough film for Marilyn Monroe as a dramatic actress. It was Wilder, however, who realized Monroe's comedic abilities in The Seven Year Itch and Some Like It Hot. Brackett's career waned by the end of the decade, though he did produce the Oscar-nominated film The King and I (1956). He received an Honorary Oscar for Lifetime Achievement in 1958.

William Holden began receiving more important parts and his career rose. He won the Best Actor Oscar for Stalag 17 (1953), also directed by Wilder, and by 1956 he was the top box-office attraction in the United States. Holden and Wilder also rejoined forces for Fedora (1978), another film critical of Hollywood.

Before the film was released, Nancy Olson had grown disenchanted with film as a career partly because the themes of Sunset Boulevard resonated with her, and also because she had become engaged to songwriter Alan Jay Lerner and decided to move to New York with him. Nevertheless, Olson's pairing with William Holden was considered a success, and she appeared opposite him in several films during the 1950s, although none of them repeated their earlier success; she returned to Hollywood to make several other films, including The Absent-Minded Professor (1961) and Son of Flubber (1963), in which she was paired with Fred MacMurray.

Similarly, Gloria Swanson was not able to leverage her own success in Sunset Boulevard. Although offered scripts, she felt that they all were poor imitations of Norma Desmond. Imagining a career that would eventually reduce her to playing "a parody of a parody," she virtually retired from films.

Sunset Boulevard was shown again in New York City in 1960, and drew such a positive response that Paramount arranged for a limited re-release in theaters throughout the United States.

Films that discuss Sunset Boulevard in their screenplays or pay homage in scenes or dialogue include Soapdish (1991), The Player (1992), Gods and Monsters (1998), Mulholland Drive (2001), Be Cool (2005), Inland Empire (2006), and Teenage Sex and Death at Camp Miasma (2026). The ending of Cecil B. Demented (2000) is a parody of Sunset Boulevard's final scene.

== Restoration and home media ==
By the late 1990s, most Sunset Boulevard prints were in poor condition, and as the film was shot using cellulose nitrate filmstock, much of the original negative had perished. Paramount Studios, believing the film merited the effort of a complete restoration, mounted an expensive project to have it digitally restored. This restored version was released on DVD in 2002. In 2012, the film was digitally restored by Paramount Pictures for Blu-ray Disc debut. Frame-by-frame digital restoration by Prasad Corporation removed dirt, tears, scratches and other defects.

In 2025, the film was restored in 4K for the 75th anniversary and released in limited theater screenings and Ultra HD Blu-ray on August 5, 2025, by Paramount Home Entertainment.

== Musical adaptations ==
=== Stapley and Hughes ===
From around 1952 to 1956, Gloria Swanson herself worked with actor Richard Stapley (aka Richard Wyler) and cabaret singer/pianist Dickson Hughes on an adaptation titled Boulevard! (at first Starring Norma Desmond). Stapley and Hughes first approached Swanson about appearing in a musical revue they had written, About Time (based on Time). Swanson stated that she would return to the stage only in a musical version of her comeback film. Within a week, Stapley and Dickson had written three songs which Swanson approved.

In this version, the romance between Gillis and Schaefer was allowed to blossom, and rather than shoot Gillis at the end, Norma gave the couple her blessing, sending them on their way to live "happily ever after."

Although Paramount gave verbal permission to proceed with the musical, there was no formal legal option. In the late 1950s, Paramount withdrew its consent, leading to the demise of the project.

In 1994, Dickson Hughes incorporated material from Boulevard! into a musical Swanson on Sunset, based on his and Stapley's experiences in writing Boulevard!.

This attempt is chronicled in the 2021 documentary Boulevard! A Hollywood Story.

=== Other failed attempts ===
Stephen Sondheim briefly considered turning Sunset Boulevard into a musical until meeting Billy Wilder at a cocktail party, who told him that the film would be better adapted as an opera rather than a musical. Hal Prince later approached Sondheim to adapt the film as a musical with Angela Lansbury playing Norma Desmond.

John Kander and Fred Ebb were also approached by Hal Prince to write a musical of Sunset Boulevard.

=== Andrew Lloyd Webber ===
A musical adaptation with book and lyrics written by Don Black and Christopher Hampton, and music by Andrew Lloyd Webber was staged in 1993 in London, with Patti LuPone playing Norma Desmond. It closely followed the film story, retained much of the dialogue and attempted to present similar set designs. It reached Broadway in 1994, with Glenn Close playing Norma Desmond. The production staged 17 previews beginning November 1, 1994, and played 977 performances at the Minskoff Theatre from November 17, 1994, through March 22, 1997. It was named Best Musical at the 1995 Tony Awards.

In 2016, Close reprised the role at the London Coliseum, followed by a 12-week run at the Palace Theater in New York City from February 2 to June 25, 2017.

Sunset Boulevard played one night at the Royal Albert Hall on December 3, 2021. The production was directed by Jordan Murphy and conducted by Alex Parker, and it starred Mazz Murray.

In 2023, Nicole Scherzinger revived the role of Norma Desmond in a 16-week run from September at London's Savoy Theatre, in a production directed by Jamie Lloyd. The production transferred to Broadway's St. James Theatre with an opening night on October 20, 2024, and closing on July 20, 2025.

A film adaptation of the musical, with Close and Lloyd Webber producing, and Close playing Norma, is in development at Paramount Pictures, with Rob Ashford directing and Tom MacRae writing. Filming was originally set to begin in late 2019, but was delayed three times due to the COVID-19 pandemic and Paramount putting the project on hold in October 2021. In May 2024, Close revealed that the film is still moving forward, but with Ashford no longer attached as director. In 2025, Scherzinger revealed that there were talks to have her play Norma in the film.

== In popular culture ==
=== Television ===
- In 1971, the film was parodied in the fourteenth episode of season five of The Carol Burnett Show in a sketch called "Sunnyset Boulevard" in which Carol Burnett played the insane "Nora Desmond" and Harvey Korman her servant Max. It then later continued as its own series of recurring sketches.
- The film has clearly influenced The Sixteen-Millimeter Shrine, which is the 1959 fourth episode of the first season of the original Twilight Zone. In it, Ida Lupino stars as Barbara Jean Trenton, an aging Hollywood film star who lives a secluded life in her mansion, reminiscing constantly about her past by watching her old films from the 1930s and planning an unrealistic comeback.
- The film was parodied in a 1992 episode of Tiny Toon Adventures titled "Sepulveda Boulevard."
- In the episode of American Dad! entitled "Star Trek," the plot revolves around the downfall of stardom and pays tribute by replicating the opening scene of the movie. The plot of the episode "A Star is Reborn" is also based on the film.
- The Archer season 7 finale and segue to the film noir Archer: Dreamland season 8 recreate the pool scene from the opening of the film.
- The Season 11 premiere of Curb Your Enthusiasm, entitled "The Five-Foot Fence", begins with Larry David finding a home invader's corpse floating face-down in his pool.
- The Season 2 episode of Better Call Saul, Amarillo, has an allusion to the film when Jimmy and the film students are shooting the commercial for Davis and Main. When Geraldine, the actress for the commercial, says "I'm ready for my close-up, Mr. McGill" while going down the stairs.
- The Twin Peaks character Gordon Cole is named after the Sunset Boulevard character. A scene from the film itself appears in Part 15 of Twin Peaks: The Return. In the scene, being viewed by Dale Cooper, the name "Gordon Cole" is spoken, which stirs Cooper's buried memory of his time in the FBI.
- The 3rd Rock from the Sun episode "Fifteen Minutes of Dick" (season 2, ep. 23) features a spoof on the film, wherein Sally, suddenly famous, spirals into Norma-esque despair as her celebrity wanes.
- The early episodes of Desperate Housewives (2004) have numerous allusions to Sunset Boulevard, including the use of a dead person as a narrator, and another character's fondness for Billy Wilder movies.
- In the movie Hick, Luli (Chloë Grace Moretz) can be found in her room reciting the movie in the mirror. Moretz stated that she was the one who suggested the quote be implemented.

=== Literature ===
Sunset Boulevard is frequently referenced in the book The Disaster Artist: My Life Inside The Room, the Greatest Bad Movie Ever Made by Greg Sestero and Tom Bissell, which documents Sestero's relationship with director and actor Tommy Wiseau and the making of Wiseau's film The Room. Quotes from Sunset Boulevard are used as epigraphs for several of the book's chapters. In a 2017 interview, Sestero stated that "I saw a lot of similarities with my story, especially when Tommy lived in a place that had a pool and wanted to make his own vanity project."

=== Politics ===
Donald Trump has cited the film as one of his personal favorites, and screened it multiple times at the White House Family Theater during his first presidency. The press subsequently brought up an analogy between Trump's Mar-a-Lago and Norma Desmond's Sunset Boulevard mansion.

=== Popular music ===
The song "Antarctica Starts Here" by John Cale, from his 1973 album Paris 1919, describes a "paranoid great movie queen" that Cale said was inspired by the character of Norma Desmond.

The song "Floating" on the album Outskirts by Canadian country-rock band Blue Rodeo references the movie in its chorus line 'I feel like William Holden floating in a pool.' The album's liner notes explain the connection to the film.

The 1996 song Sunset Boulevard by the Spanish songwriter Javier Álvarez includes the verses Los años de papel te vuelven a cegar / Como a Norma Desmond en Sunset Boulevard ("The paper years blind you again / as [they blinded] Norma Desmond in 'Sunset Boulevard'".)

The 2017 song "You're So Cool" from the album Sleepwalking by New Zealand artist Jonathan Bree includes the lyrics Now like the faded star/In sunset blvd/I play the devoted butler/Morning coffees by the bed.

=== Professional wrestling ===
The "Timeless" gimmick, as portrayed by Australian wrestler Toni Storm in All Elite Wrestling since 2023, is primarily based upon the character of Norma Desmond, with her "butler" – Canadian wrestler Dr. Luther – being based upon the character of Max von Mayerling. The storyline involving Storm also draws inspiration from the film All About Eve, with Storm's character also sharing traits with the character of Margo Channing, and English wrestler Mariah May portraying an Eve Harrington-esque foil to Storm.

== See also ==
- List of cult films

== Bibliography ==
- Corliss, Richard (1974). Talking Pictures: Screenwriters in the American Cinema, 1927–1973. Overlook Press. ISBN 0-87951-007-2
- Hadleigh, Boze (1996). Bette Davis Speaks. Barricade Books. ISBN 1-56980-066-9.
- Kael, Pauline (1982). 5001 Nights at the Movies. Zenith Books. ISBN 0-09-933550-6.
- Kirgo, Julie (1979). "Sunset Boulevard". In Alain Silver and Elizabeth Ward, eds, Film noir: An encyclopedic reference to the American style. Woodstock: Overlook Press, 1979. ISBN 0-87951-055-2.
- Perry, George & Andrew Lloyd Webber (1993). Sunset Boulevard, From Movie to Musical. Pavilion. ISBN 1-85793-208-0.
- Phillips, Gene (2010). Some Like It Wilder: The Life and Controversial Films of Billy Wilder. The University Press of Kentucky. ISBN 978-0-8131-7367-2.
- Randall, Stephen (2006). The Playboy Interviews: Larger Than Life. Milwaukie, OR: M Press. ISBN 1595820469.
- Sikov, Ed (1998). On Sunset Boulevard: The Life and Times of Billy Wilder. New York: Hyperion. ISBN 0-7868-6194-0.
- Sondheim, Stephen (2011). Look, I made a hat : collected lyrics (1981-2011) with attendant comments, amplifications, dogmas, harangues, wafflings, anecdotes and miscellany. London: Virgin. ISBN 0753522608.
- Staggs, Sam (2001). All About "All About Eve". St Martin's Press. ISBN 0-312-27315-0.
- Staggs, Sam (2002). Close-up on Sunset Boulevard: Billy Wilder, Norma Desmond, and the Dark Hollywood Dream. New York St. Martin's Press. ISBN 0-312-27453-X.
- Swanson, Gloria (1981). Swanson on Swanson, The Making of a Hollywood Legend. Hamlyn. ISBN 0-600-20496-0.
- Wiley, Mason and Damien Bona (1987). Inside Oscar, The Unofficial History of the Academy Awards. Ballantine Books. ISBN 0-345-34453-7.
