= National Board of Review Awards 1950 =

Annual US film awards ceremony

22nd National Board of Review Awards

December 20, 1950

The 22nd National Board of Review Awards were announced on December 20, 1950.

== Top Ten Films ==
1. Sunset Boulevard
2. All About Eve
3. The Asphalt Jungle
4. The Men
5. Edge of Doom
6. Twelve O'Clock High
7. Panic in the Streets
8. Cyrano de Bergerac
9. No Way Out
10. Stage Fright

== Top Foreign Films ==
1. The Titan: Story of Michelangelo
2. Tight Little Island
3. The Third Man
4. Kind Hearts and Coronets
5. Paris 1900

== Winners ==
- Best Film: Sunset Boulevard
- Best Foreign Language Film: The Titan
- Best Actor: Alec Guinness (Kind Hearts and Coronets)
- Best Actress: Gloria Swanson (Sunset Boulevard)
- Best Director: John Huston (The Asphalt Jungle)
