= D. M. Marshman Jr. =

American screenwriter

- Born: Donald McGill Marshman Jr. December 21, 1922; Cleveland, Ohio
- Died: September 17, 2015 (aged 92); Darien, Connecticut
- Occupations: Writer, playwright, screenwriter

Donald McGill Marshman Jr. (December 21, 1922 – September 17, 2015) credited as D. M. Marshman, was an American screenwriter known mainly for his contribution to the film script for Sunset Boulevard.

== Background ==
Marshman was the son of Donald McGill and Maud Louise (McMurray) Marshman.

He was educated at Andover and Yale, receiving his B.A. in 1945. Originally hired as an editorial researcher at Life magazine, he eventually became the magazine's movie editor before moving to Time magazine, where he was the film critic.

== Career ==
In 1946, Marshman collaborated with T. O. Cole on Poets Corner, a comedy in three acts. In 1948, Marshman was recruited by Charles Brackett and Billy Wilder to help write the screenplay of Sunset Boulevard. He suggested that a gigolo be introduced to the story as a romantic interest for the heroine. Characteristics of the main character can be attributed to Marshman, such as name similarity, personality, and identical birthday. He shared a screenwriting credit with Wilder and Brackett. The trio won an Academy Award for Best Original Screenplay. Marshman has two other films to his credit, the 1953 productions Taxi (screenplay) and Second Chance (story).

He chose to return to the East Coast in 1953, where he pursued a career in advertising for Young & Rubicam and other agencies, including one he started himself. From 1974 to 1979, he conducted a fund-raising campaign for Yale University, and spent later years as a freelance consultant, writing speeches for corporate CEOs, and doing other business writing.
