= All About Eve =

1950 film by Joseph L. Mankiewicz

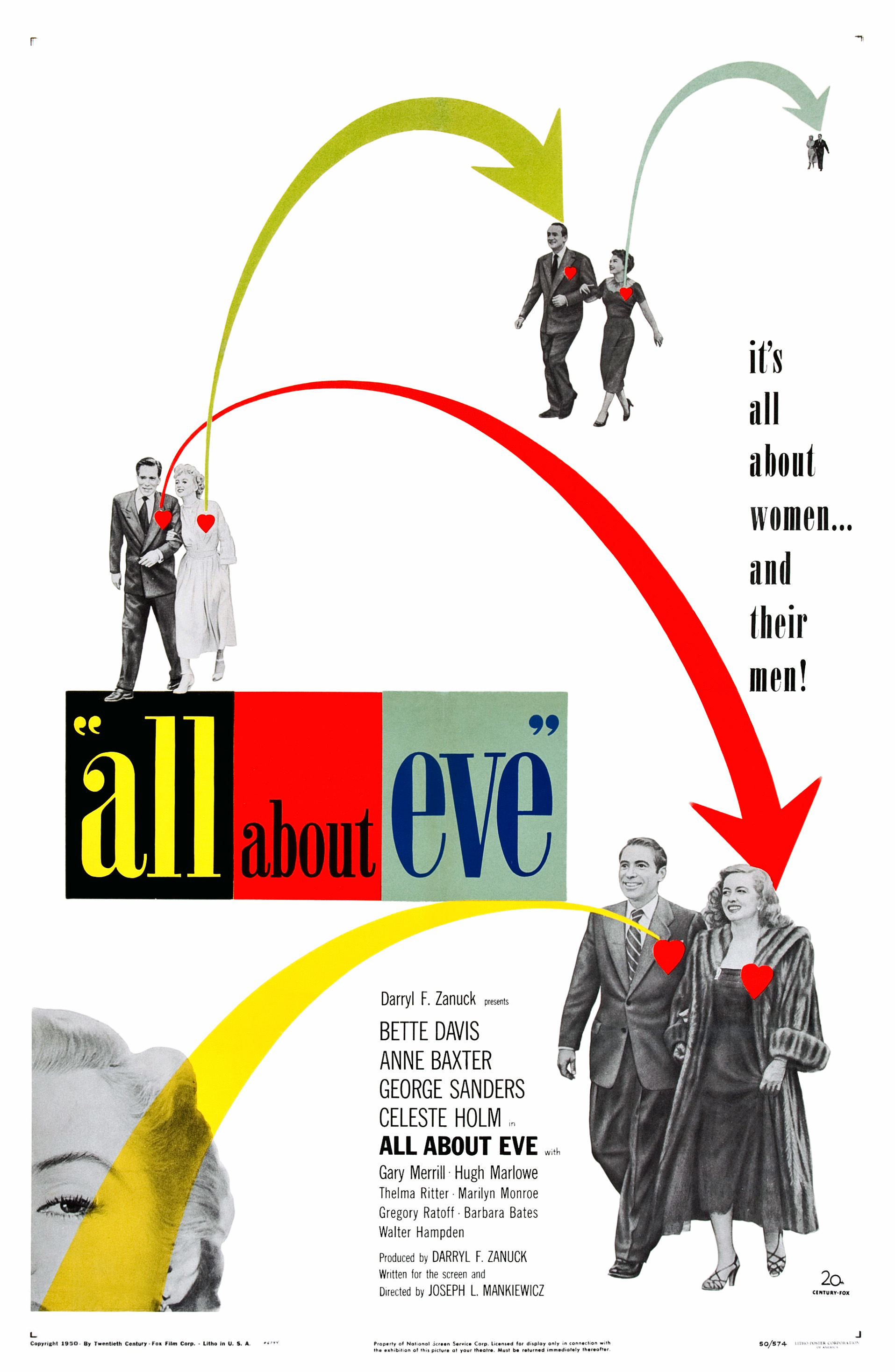
- Theatrical release poster
- Directed by: Joseph L. Mankiewicz
- Screenplay by: Joseph L. Mankiewicz
- Based on: "The Wisdom of Eve"; 1946 story in Cosmopolitan by Mary Orr
- Produced by: Darryl F. Zanuck
- Starring: Bette Davis; Anne Baxter; George Sanders; Celeste Holm; Gary Merrill; Hugh Marlowe; Thelma Ritter; Marilyn Monroe; Gregory Ratoff; Barbara Bates; Walter Hampden
- Cinematography: Milton R. Krasner
- Edited by: Barbara McLean
- Music by: Alfred Newman
- Production company: 20th Century-Fox
- Distributed by: 20th Century-Fox
- Release date: October 13, 1950 (New York City)
- Running time: 138 minutes
- Country: United States
- Language: English
- Budget: $1.4 million
- Box office: $8.4 million

All About Eve is a 1950 American drama film written and directed by Joseph L. Mankiewicz, and produced by Darryl F. Zanuck. It is based on the 1946 short story (and subsequent 1949 radio drama) "The Wisdom of Eve" by Mary Orr, although Orr does not receive a screen credit.

The film stars Bette Davis as Margo Channing, a highly regarded but aging Broadway star, and Anne Baxter as Eve Harrington, an ambitious young fan who maneuvers herself into Channing's life, ultimately threatening Channing's career and her personal relationships. The film co-stars George Sanders, Celeste Holm, Gary Merrill, and Hugh Marlowe, and features Thelma Ritter, Gregory Ratoff, Barbara Bates, Walter Hampden, and Marilyn Monroe in one of her earliest roles.

All About Eve held its world premiere in New York City on October 13, 1950. Highly praised by critics at the time of its release, it received a record 14 nominations (Note: This feat was matched by the 1997 film Titanic and the 2016 film La La Land and surpassed by the 2025 film Sinners.) at the 23rd Academy Awards, becoming the only film in Oscar history to receive four female acting nominations (Davis and Baxter as Best Actress, Holm and Ritter as Best Supporting Actress). It went on to win six awards, including Best Picture, as well as Best Director and Best Adapted Screenplay, Mankiewicz's second consecutive wins in both categories.

Widely considered as among the greatest films of all time, in 1990, All About Eve became one of 25 films selected that year for preservation in the United States Library of Congress's National Film Registry, deemed "culturally, historically, or aesthetically significant". The film was ranked No. 16 on AFI's 1998 list of the 100 best American films.

== Plot ==
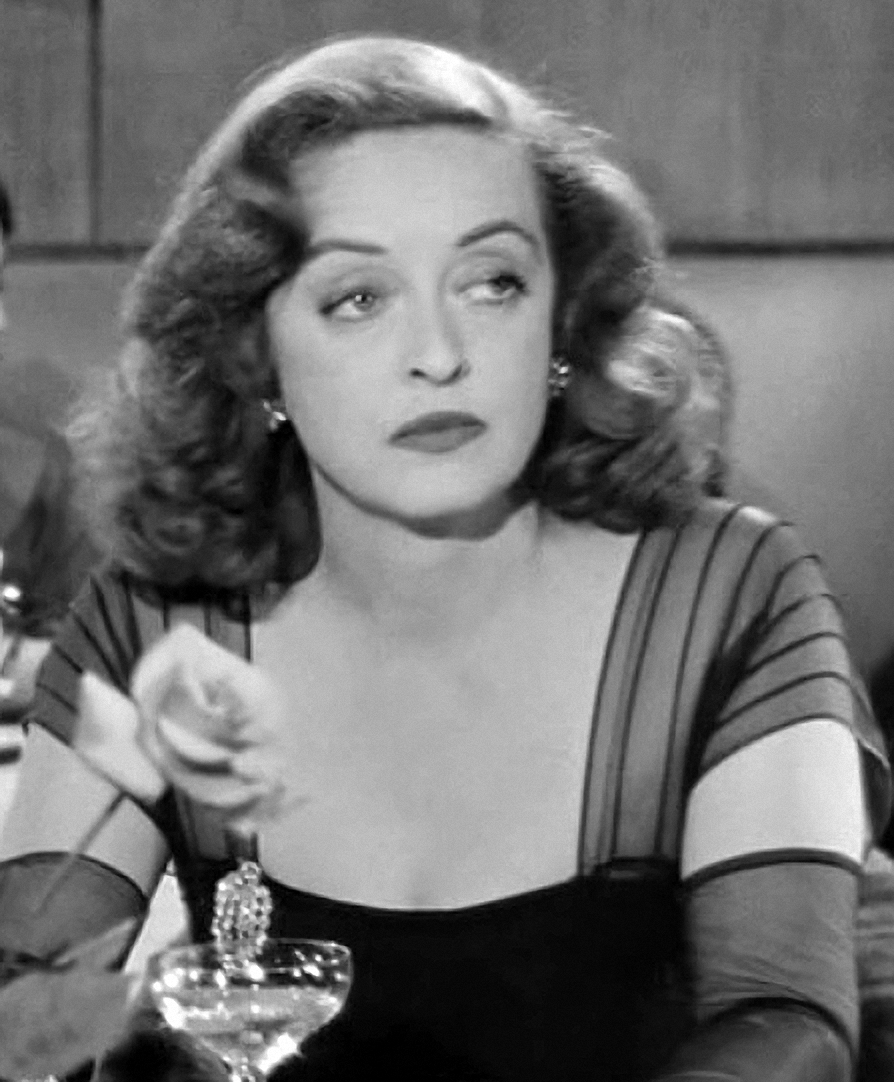
Bette Davis as Margo Channing

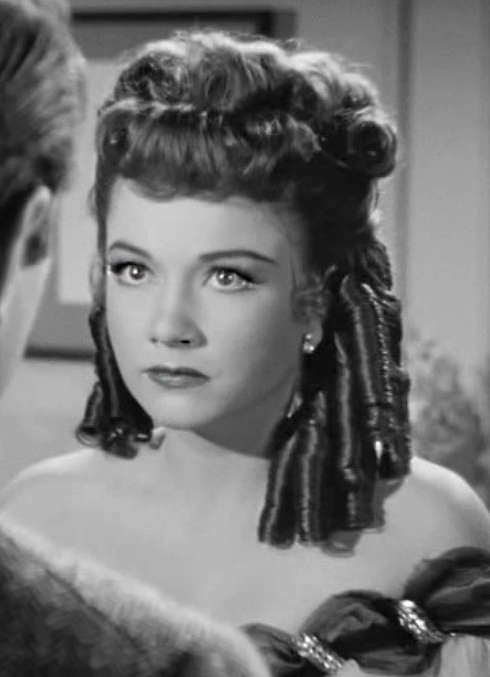
Anne Baxter as Eve Harrington

At the Sarah Siddons Award ceremony honoring rising actress Eve Harrington, narration from acerbic theatre critic Addison DeWitt introduces the attendees and hints that there is more to Eve's story.

The previous October, Karen Richards, wife of playwright Lloyd Richards, notices Eve has repeatedly hovered outside the theater where aging Broadway star Margo Channing is starring in a play written by Lloyd. When Karen introduces Eve to Margo as her devoted fan, Eve tells Margo, Karen, and Lloyd that she followed Margo's last theatrical tour from San Francisco to New York City. She relates her impoverished childhood and the loss of her husband during World War II. Moved by Eve's story, Margo takes her into her home as her assistant. Eve quickly manipulates her way into Margo's life as both secretary and adoring fan.

Having just turned forty, Margo is concerned about her romantic relationship with the play’s director, Bill Simpson, eight years her junior, who is directing a film in California. Without telling Margo, Eve arranges a midnight long-distance phone call from Margo to Bill on his birthday. Eve hopes the unexpected call will show Bill that Margo forgot his birthday, while Eve sent her own greeting. Realizing Eve set her up, Margo asks producer Max Fabian to hire Eve at his office; instead of being distanced, Eve becomes Margo's understudy without Margo's knowledge.

As Margo's irritation grows, Karen sympathizes with Eve, believing that Margo is overdramatizing her resentment. Hoping to humble Margo, Karen conspires for her to miss a performance so Eve will perform in her place. Eve secretly invites the city's theater critics, including Addison, to attend the performance. Eve's performance is a triumph. Later that night, Eve attempts to seduce Bill, but he rejects her.

Addison interviews Eve for a column harshly criticizing Margo for resisting younger talent. Eve apologizes to Lloyd, claiming her statements in the article were misrepresented, and subtly convinces him to consider her instead of Margo for the lead role, Cora, in his next play.

Margo and Bill announce their engagement while dining out with Lloyd and Karen. Dining at the same restaurant with Addison, Eve summons Karen to the restroom. After first appearing regretful, she delivers an ultimatum: Karen must recommend her to Lloyd to play Cora or she will have Addison expose Karen's part in Margo's missed performance in his newspaper column. When Karen returns to the table—to her relief—Margo surprisingly announces she does not wish to play Cora. Admitting she is too old for the ingénue role, Margo says her impending marriage means the theater no longer has to be her entire life.

Despite the objections of Bill, who is directing the play, Eve is cast as Cora. Just before the out-of-town opening, Eve tells Addison that Lloyd and she are in a relationship; she plans to marry Lloyd, who will write plays for her to star in. Angered by Eve's audacity, Addison reveals he knows her backstory is false; her real name is Gertrude Slescynski, she never went to San Francisco, she was never married, and she was paid to leave town over an affair with her married boss. He blackmails Eve, forbidding her from trying to marry Lloyd and saying she now "belongs" to him.

Months later, Eve is a Broadway star headed for Hollywood. While accepting the Sarah Siddons Award, Eve thanks Margo, Bill, Lloyd, and Karen, who react with indifference. Giving Karen his award, Lloyd thanks her for her endurance. Skipping the after-party, Eve returns home, where she encounters Phoebe, a teenage fan who slipped into her apartment and fell asleep. After Phoebe professes her adoration and ingratiates herself tidying up, Eve observes it is too late for Phoebe to take the long subway ride back home. While Eve is resting, Addison brings Eve's forgotten award to the door. When Addison doubts Phoebe is her real name, she admits she chose her own theatrical name. Handing over Eve’s award, Addison suggests Phoebe ask Eve how to get one. Phoebe lies to Eve that a taxi driver dropped off the award. When she is alone, Phoebe puts on Eve's elegant cloak and poses in front of a floor-length mirror, holding the award and bowing.

== Cast ==
The principal cast of All About Eve. (Left to right) Gary Merrill, Bette Davis, George Sanders, Anne Baxter, Hugh Marlowe and Celeste Holm

- Bette Davis as Margo Channing
- Anne Baxter as Gertrude Slescynski / Eve Harrington
- George Sanders as Addison DeWitt
- Celeste Holm as Karen Richards
- Gary Merrill as Bill Simpson
- Hugh Marlowe as Lloyd Richards
- Gregory Ratoff as Max Fabian
- Thelma Ritter as Birdie Coonan
- Marilyn Monroe as Claudia Casswell
- Barbara Bates as Phoebe
- Walter Hampden as Aged Actor (Sarah Siddons Award presenter)
- Randy Stuart as Girl
- Craig Hill as Leading Man
- Leland Harris as Doorman
- Barbara White as Autograph Seeker
- Eddie Fisher as Stage Manager
- William Pullen as Clerk
- Claude Stroud as Pianist (at party)
- Eugene Borden as Frenchman
- Helen Mowery as Reporter
- Steven Geray as Captain of Waiters

== Production ==
=== Development ===
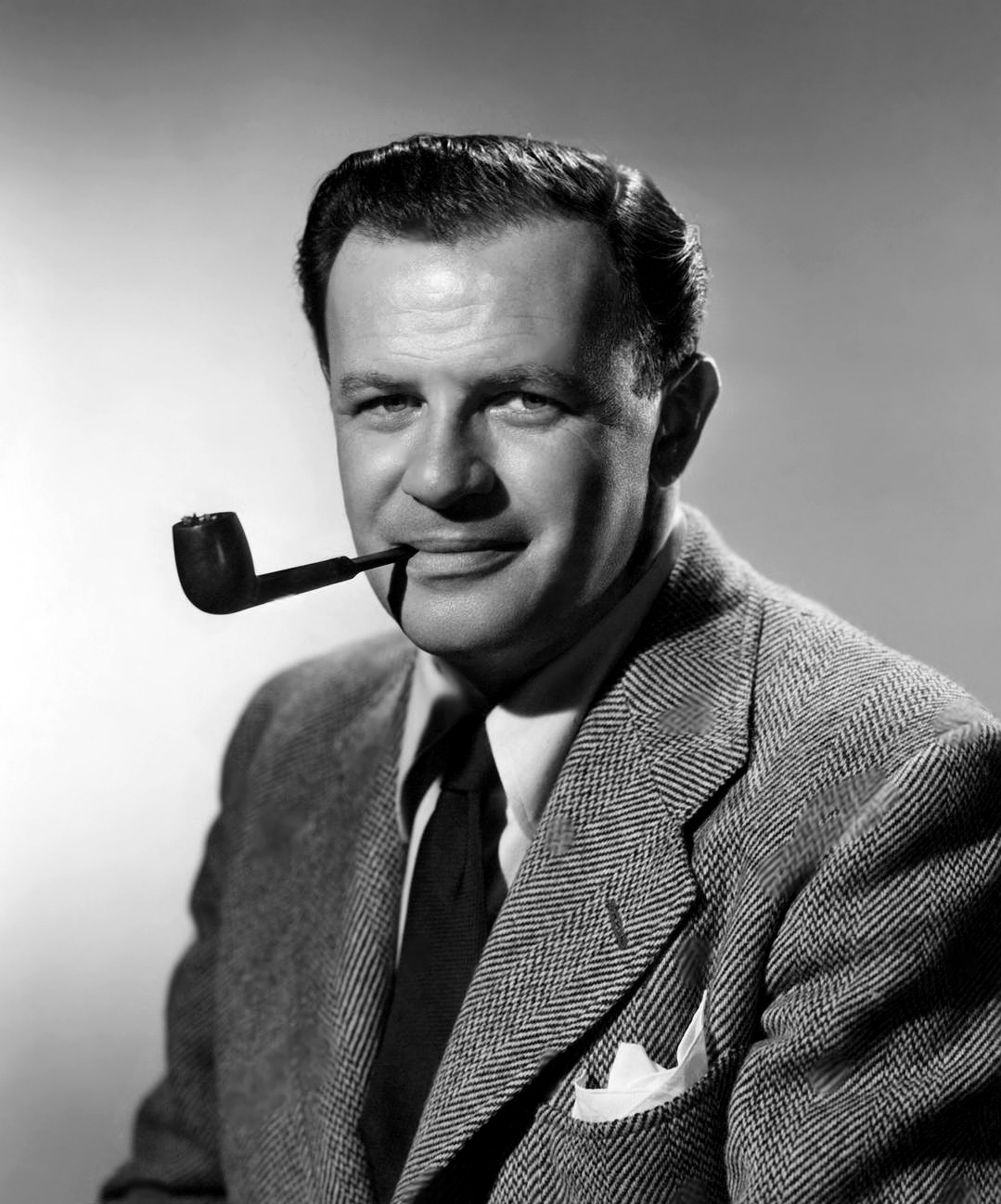
Joseph L. Mankiewicz in 1950

All About Eve was based on the short story "The Wisdom of Eve" written by Mary Orr and published in Cosmopolitan magazine in May 1946. The story was a highly fictionalized account inspired by an anecdote related by Austrian actress Elisabeth Bergner. Bergner told Orr about a young Englishwoman who stood outside the Booth Theatre for several days. Bergner invited the woman into her dressing room and later gave her a job as her secretary to her husband. The woman later became Bergner's understudy and tried to take control of Bergner's life. Bergner confirmed the basis of the story in her autobiography Bewundert viel und viel gescholten (translated as Greatly Admired and Greatly Scolded), devoting five pages to her anecdote.

On January 24, 1949, "The Wisdom of Eve" was adapted into a radio episode broadcast on NBC's Radio City Playhouse. Orr wrote the radio play, changing the name of lead character Margola to Margo. Claudia Morgan was cast as Margo, Marilyn Erskine played Eve and Orr portrayed Karen Richards. A few days later, Twentieth Century-Fox optioned the film rights to Orr's story for $5,000 (equivalent to $67,657 in 2025). The story caught the attention of James Fisher, the head of the studio's story department, and he sent the story to several contracted producers, writers and directors. On April 29, Joseph L. Mankiewicz sent a memo to studio president Darryl F. Zanuck suggesting that they exercise their option on Orr's story. He stated that the story "fits in with an original idea [of mine] and can be combined. Superb starring role for Susan Hayward."

As he was filming No Way Out (1950), Mankiewicz wrote an 82-page film treatment titled Best Performance during the summer and early fall of 1949. Over the course of six weeks at the San Ysidro Ranch, he expanded his treatment into a first draft. Mankiewicz changed Margo's surname from Cranston to Channing, but Mankiewicz retained Orr's characters Eve Harrington and Lloyd and Karen Richards. He also removed Margo's husband from the original story and replaced him with a new love interest, Bill Simpson. Mankiewicz also created the characters Addison DeWitt, Birdie Coonan, Max Fabian and Phoebe.

By January 1950, Zanuck had received Mankiewicz's draft, and he provided numerous suggestions for improving the screenplay. Zanuck underlined a phrase in Addison DeWitt's voiceover narration: "Eve ... but more of Eve, later. All about Eve, in fact." Zanuck also suggested diluting Birdie Coonan's early mistrust of Eve so that the audience would not recognize Eve as a villainess until much later in the story. After inserting several of Zanuck's suggestions, Mankiewicz delivered another revised draft—dubbed the "temporary draft"—on March 1.

On March 7, Zanuck wrote in a memo to Mankiewicz: "Without any question of a doubt you have done a remarkable job. The holes that were present in certain sections of the original treatment have disappeared." However, Zanuck sent nine pages of notes, detailing recommended cuts or revisions: "I have tried to sincerely point out the spots that appeared dull or overdrawn. I have not let the length of the script influence me. I have tried to cut it as I am sure I would cut if I were in the projection room." Mankiewicz's draft, which had run 223 pages, was truncated to 180. According to Fox records, Mankiewicz's writing services on the project were terminated on March 24, and by April, he started his official assignment as director.

All About Eve was the first film to have its screenplay published in hardcover format when it was published by Random House in 1951. Mankiewicz wrote the book's dedication: "To Rosa—the critic on my hearth" (a pun on "cricket on the hearth".)

=== Casting ===
A young and unknown Marilyn Monroe as Miss Casswell in a scene with Anne Baxter, Bette Davis and George Sanders

Several actresses were considered for the role of Margo Channing. Mankiewicz's original choice was Susan Hayward, but at 32 years old, she was deemed too young. As the script was being written, Zanuck was favorable to casting Claudette Colbert or Barbara Stanwyck. By February 1950, the role had been awarded to Claudette Colbert, but while filming Three Came Home (1950), she was hospitalized indefinitely for an injured back. With a San Francisco studio already leased for two weeks, Zanuck could not wait for Colbert to recover and sought to quickly replace her. Mankiewicz suggested Gertrude Lawrence, but Lawrence's attorney Fanny Holtzmann insisted that the screenplay be changed so that Lawrence would not smoke or drink in the film and would sing a torch song (instead of "Liebesträume" by Franz Liszt) about Bill in the party scene. Mankiewicz declined her proposed script alterations.

Mankiewicz and Zanuck briefly considered Marlene Dietrich, but Mankiewicz felt that her German accent would be incompatible with the dialogue. In 1972, Mankiewicz stated: "I was, and am, a great admirer of Marlene. But from what I knew of her work and equipment as an actress, I simply could not visualize—or hear—her as a possible Margo." Zanuck contacted Ingrid Bergman to replace Colbert, but Bergman refused to leave Italy for the production.

Bette Davis, who had ended her decades-long association with Warner Bros., was filming Payment on Demand (1951) when she received a phone call from Zanuck but was convinced that it was a prank. Zanuck and Davis had not been on speaking terms since Davis resigned from the Academy. Zanuck sent her the script with the understanding that Davis, if she agreed to the part, would need to be ready to film within ten days. In her 1962 autobiography The Lonely Life, Davis recalled: "When I finished reading All About Eve, I was on cloud nine. Any inconvenience was worth it."

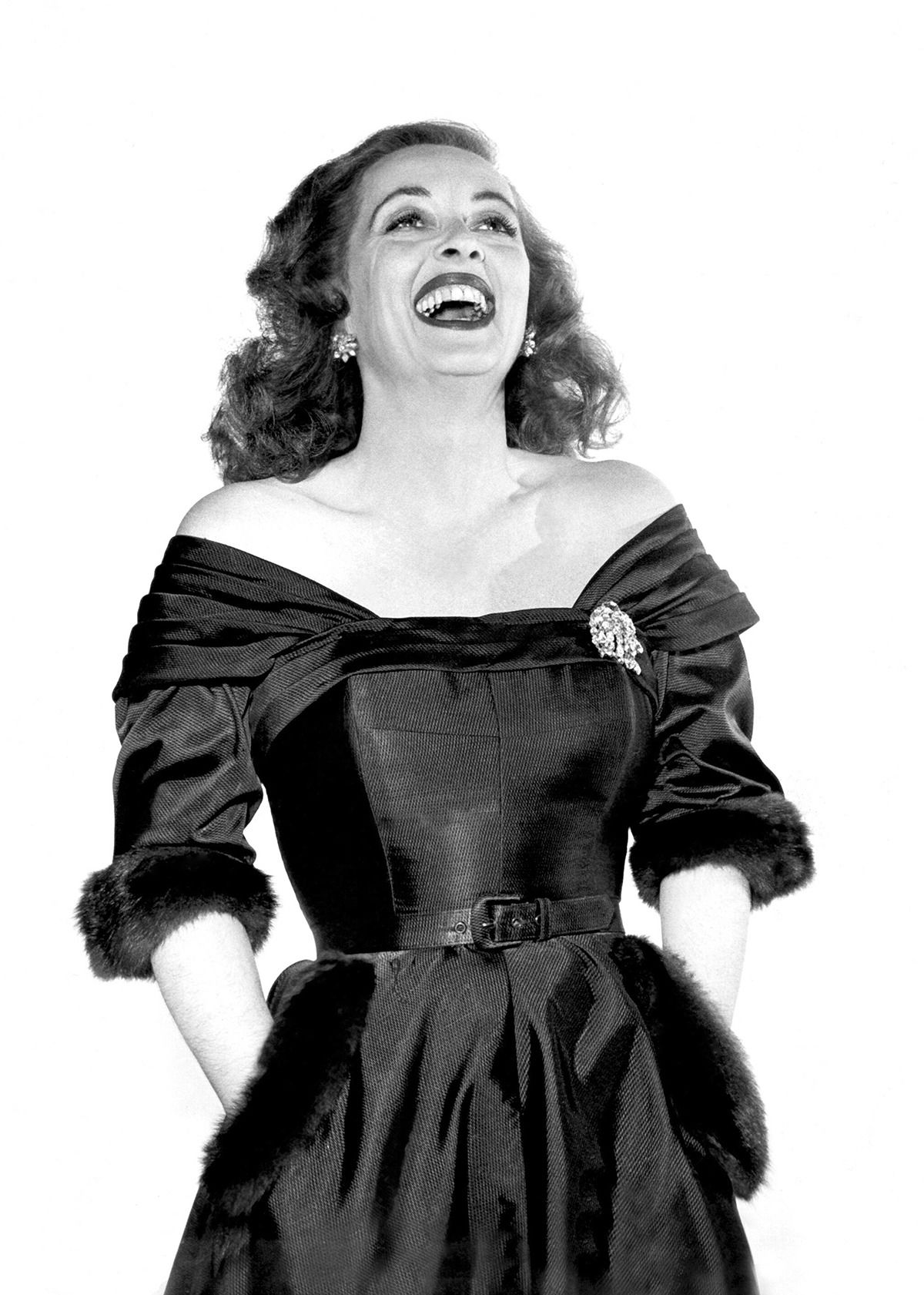
Davis in a publicity still for the film, 1950.

Jeanne Crain was Zanuck's first choice for Eve Harrington. Mankiewicz had worked with Crain on A Letter to Three Wives (1949) but felt that her performance was unsatisfactory. He told Zanuck that he felt Crain lacked the "bitch virtuosity" required by the part. Mankiewicz suggested Anne Baxter, who was also under contract to Fox, as an alternative, which Zanuck approved. By then, Crain had become pregnant, which eliminated her from consideration.

At least a dozen actresses, including Sheree North, had tested for the role of Miss Casswell. Marilyn Monroe auditioned for the part and had been Mankiewicz's first choice. Decades later, Mankiewicz described "a breathlessness and sort-of glued on innocence about her that I found appealing." Monroe appears in only two scenes. On her first day of shooting for the party scene, with most of the cast present, she arrived one hour late. According Gary Merrill, there were 25 takes for the scene with Miss Casswell and Addison DeWitt in the theater lobby.

Mankiewicz wrote the character of Birdie Coonan for Thelma Ritter, having worked with her on A Letter to Three Wives. José Ferrer was Zanuck's first choice for Addison DeWitt, but he was replaced by George Sanders. Barbara Bates won the part of the minor character Phoebe.

== Reception ==
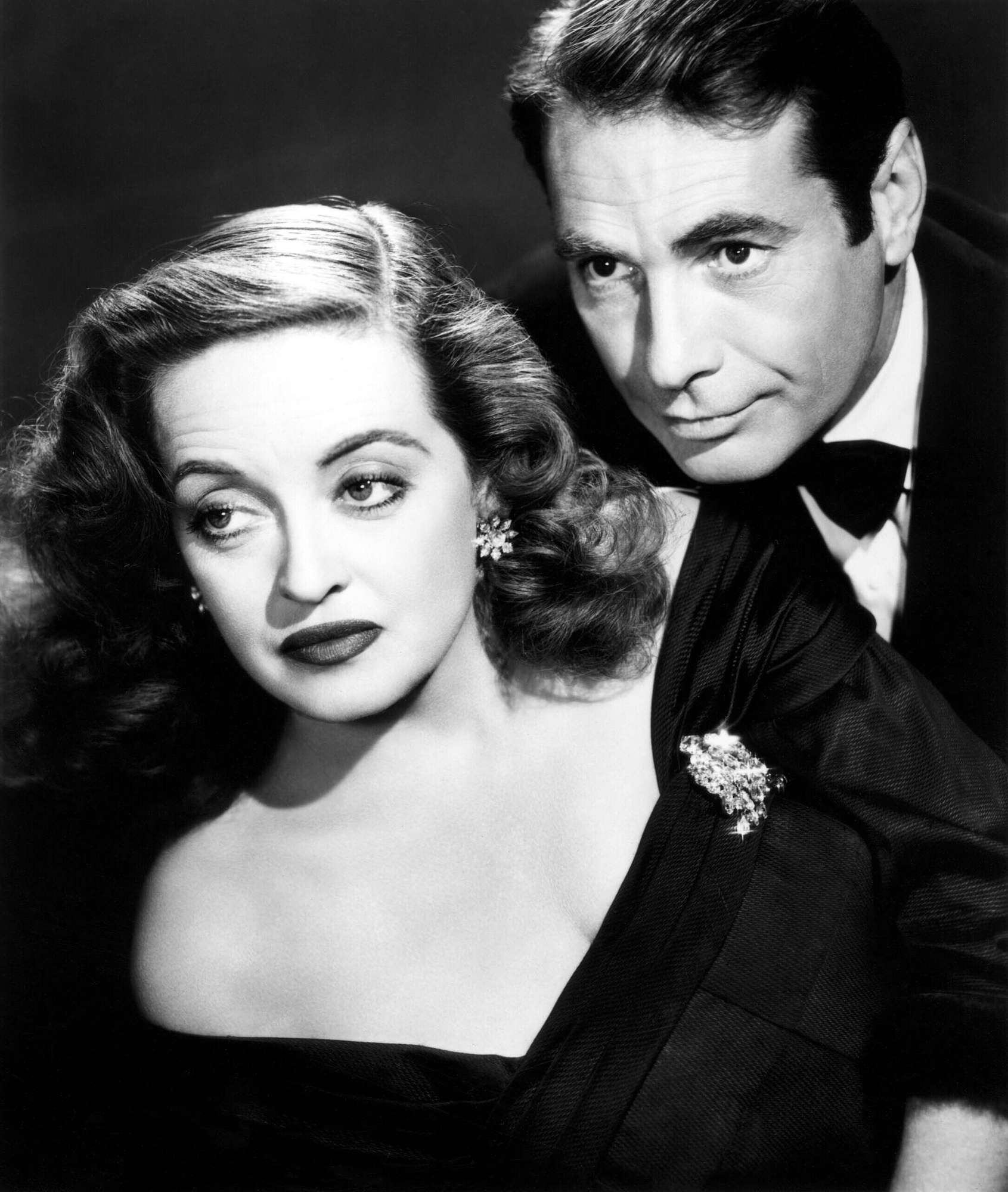
Bette Davis and Gary Merrill

=== Box office ===
By January 1951, All About Eve earned $3.1 million in box office rentals in the United States and Canada during its release, more than double its original budget of $1.4 million. The film had a cumulative gross of $8.4 million.

=== Critical response ===
All About Eve received widespread critical acclaim upon its release. Bosley Crowther of The New York Times loved the picture, stating that "a fine Darryl Zanuck production, excellent music and an air of ultra-class complete this superior satire." Abel Green of Variety called it "a literate, adult film" with "exceedingly well-cast performances wherein Miss Davis does not spare herself, makeup wise, in the aging star assignment. Miss Baxter gives the proper shading to her cool and calculating approach in the process of ingratiation and ultimate opportunities; and the other principals mouth dialog which is real and convincing."

Richard L. Coe of The Washington Post called All About Eve "the wittiest comedy of the year" and stated Davis gives "the finest role of her honorable career." Harrison's Reports called it "a fascinating, continually absorbing story about Broadway theatrical people, given a mature treatment and penetrated with realistic dialogue and flashes of slick, sardonic humor." John McCarten of The New Yorker called it "a thoroughly entertaining movie."

In a 2000 review, Roger Ebert of the Chicago Sun Times praised the film, saying of Bette Davis that "veteran actress Margo Channing in All About Eve was her greatest role."

All About Eve holds an approval rating of 99% on Rotten Tomatoes based on 110 reviews. The site's critics consensus reads: "Smart, sophisticated, and devastatingly funny, All About Eve is a Hollywood classic that only improves with age." Metacritic assigned a weighted average score of 98 out of 100, based on 15 critics, indicating "universal acclaim".

=== Thematic content ===
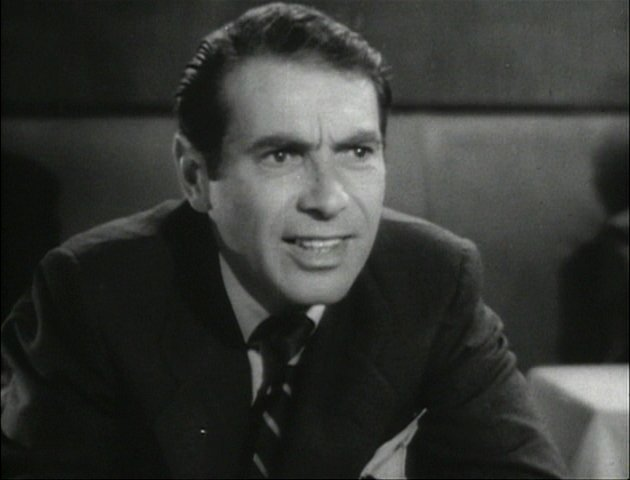
Gary Merrill as Bill Simpson

Critics and academics have delineated various themes in the film. Rebecca Flint Marx, in her Allmovie review, notes the antagonism that existed between Broadway and Hollywood at the time, stating that the "script summoned into existence a whole array of painfully recognizable theatre types, from the aging, egomaniacal grand dame to the outwardly docile, inwardly scheming ingenue to the powerful critic who reeks of malignant charm." Abel Green, writing in Variety said, "The snide references to picture people, the plug for San Francisco ("an oasis of civilization in the California desert") and the like are purposeful and manifest an intelligent reflex from a group of hyper-talented people towards the picture business."

Roger Ebert, in his review in The Great Movies, says Eve Harrington is "a universal type", and focuses on the aging actress plot line, comparing the film to Sunset Boulevard. Similarly, Marc Lee's 2006 review of the film for The Daily Telegraph describes a subtext "into the darker corners of show business, exposing its inherent ageism, especially when it comes to female stars." Kathleen Woodward's 1999 book, Figuring Age: Women, Bodies, Generations (Theories of Contemporary Culture), also discusses themes that appeared in many of the "aging actress" films of the 1950s and 1960s, including All About Eve. She reasons that Margo has three options: "To continue to work, she can perform the role of a young woman, one she no longer seems that interested in. She can take up the position of the angry bitch, the drama queen who holds court (the deliberate camp that Susan Sontag finds in this film). Or she can accept her culture's gendered discourse of aging which figures her as in her moment of fading. Margo ultimately chooses the latter option, accepting her position as one of loss."

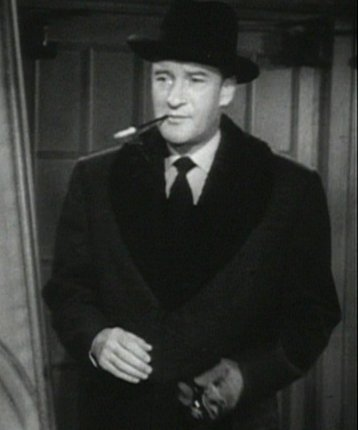
George Sanders as Addison DeWitt

All About Eve has long been a favored film among gay audiences, due in part to its campy overtones and the casting of Davis. Margo Channing has become a staple among drag queens. Davis, who long has had a strong gay fanbase, expressed support for gay men in her 1972 interview with The Advocate.

== Accolades ==
Award	Category	Nominee(s)	Result	Ref.
Academy Awards	Best Motion Picture	20th Century-Fox	Won	
Academy Awards	Best Director	Joseph L. Mankiewicz	Won	
Academy Awards	Best Actress	Anne Baxter	Nominated	
Academy Awards	Best Actress	Bette Davis	Nominated	
Academy Awards	Best Supporting Actor	George Sanders	Won	
Academy Awards	Best Supporting Actress	Celeste Holm	Nominated	
Academy Awards	Best Supporting Actress	Thelma Ritter	Nominated	
Academy Awards	Best Screenplay	Joseph L. Mankiewicz	Won	
Academy Awards	Best Art Direction – Black-and-White	Art Direction: Lyle R. Wheeler and George Davis; Set Decoration: Thomas Little and Walter M. Scott	Nominated	
Academy Awards	Best Cinematography – Black-and-White	Milton R. Krasner	Nominated	
Academy Awards	Best Costume Design – Black and White	Edith Head and Charles LeMaire	Won	
Academy Awards	Best Film Editing	Barbara McLean	Nominated	
Academy Awards	Best Scoring of a Dramatic or Comedy Picture	Alfred Newman	Nominated	
Academy Awards	Best Sound Recording	Thomas T. Moulton	Won	
Bodil Awards	Best American Film	Joseph L. Mankiewicz	Won	
British Academy Film Awards	Best Film from any Source		Won	
Cahiers du Cinéma	Best Film	Joseph L. Mankiewicz	5th Place	
Cannes Film Festival	Grand Prix	Joseph L. Mankiewicz	Nominated	
Cannes Film Festival	Special Jury Prize	Joseph L. Mankiewicz	Won	
Cannes Film Festival	Best Actress	Bette Davis	Won	
Directors Guild of America Awards	Outstanding Directorial Achievement in Motion Pictures	Joseph L. Mankiewicz	Won	
Dorian Awards	Timeless Award		Won	
Golden Globe Awards	Best Motion Picture – Drama		Nominated	
Golden Globe Awards	Best Actress in a Motion Picture – Drama	Bette Davis	Nominated	
Golden Globe Awards	Best Supporting Actor – Motion Picture	George Sanders	Nominated	
Golden Globe Awards	Best Supporting Actress – Motion Picture	Thelma Ritter	Nominated	
Golden Globe Awards	Best Director – Motion Picture	Joseph L. Mankiewicz	Nominated	
Golden Globe Awards	Best Screenplay – Motion Picture	Joseph L. Mankiewicz	Won	
Kinema Junpo Awards	Best Foreign Language Film	Joseph L. Mankiewicz	Won	
Nastro d'Argento	Best Foreign Actress	Bette Davis	Won	
National Board of Review Awards	Top Ten Films		Won	
National Film Preservation Board	National Film Registry		Inducted	
New York Film Critics Circle Awards	Best Film		Won	
New York Film Critics Circle Awards	Best Director	Joseph L. Mankiewicz	Won	
New York Film Critics Circle Awards	Best Actress	Bette Davis	Won	
Online Film & Television Association Awards	Film Hall of Fame: Productions		Inducted	
Picturegoer Awards	Best Actress	Anne Baxter	Nominated	
Picturegoer Awards	Best Actress	Bette Davis	Nominated	
Producers Guild of America Awards	PGA Hall of Fame – Motion Pictures		Won	
Writers Guild of America Awards	Best Written American Comedy	Joseph L. Mankiewicz	Won	
Writers Guild of America Awards	Best Written American Drama	Joseph L. Mankiewicz	Nominated	

=== Later recognition and rankings ===
In 1990, All About Eve was selected for preservation in the United States National Film Registry by the Library of Congress as being "culturally, historically, or aesthetically significant." The Academy Film Archive preserved All About Eve in 2000. The film received in 1997 a placement on the Producers Guild of America Hall of Fame. The film has been selected by the American Film Institute for many of their 100 Years lists.

Year	Category	Nominee	Rank
1998	AFI's 100 Years...100 Movies	All About Eve	16
2003	AFI's 100 Years...100 Heroes and Villains	Eve Harrington (Villain)	23
2005	AFI's 100 Years...100 Movie Quotes	"Fasten your seatbelts. It's going to be a bumpy night."	9
2007	AFI's 100 Years...100 Movies (10th Anniversary Edition)	All About Eve	28

When AFI named Bette Davis #2 on its list of the greatest female American screen legends, All About Eve was the film selected to highlight Davis' legendary career. In 2006, the Writers Guild of America has ranked the film's screenplay as the fifth greatest ever written. In 2016, the Directors Guild of America ranked the film 59th on its list of The 80 Best-Directed Films since the Guild’s founding in 1936.

== Home media ==
All About Eve was released on VHS in 1979, LaserDisc in 1996 and DVD in 1999. A restored Fox Studio Classics edition was released on DVD in 2003 and on Blu-ray on February 1, 2011, with an up-mixed 5.1 DTS-HD Master Audio track. It was reissued on Blu-ray by The Criterion Collection on November 25, 2019, which uses the film's original mono audio.

== Adaptations ==
The first radio adaptation was a one-hour broadcast on Lux Radio Theatre on CBS Radio on October 1, 1951, with Bette Davis, Gary Merrill and Anne Baxter reprising their original roles. Lux Radio Theatre did a follow-up adaptation on November 23, 1954, this time on NBC radio with Ann Blyth and Claire Trevor playing the lead roles, with Trevor replacing Ida Lupino when she became ill and was unable to attend the broadcast.

A radio version of All About Eve starring Tallulah Bankhead as Margo Channing was presented on NBC's The Big Show by the Theatre Guild of the Air on November 16, 1952. Bankhead and many contemporary critics felt that the characterization of Margo Channing was patterned on her, a long-rumored charge denied by Davis, but attested by costume designer Edith Head. Additionally, Bankhead's rivalry with her understudy (Lizabeth Scott) during the production of The Skin of Our Teeth is cited as an alternative hypothesis for the origin of Mary Orr's The Wisdom of Eve, the original short story that formed the basis for the film. Bette Davis played three roles on film that Tallulah Bankhead had originated – Dark Victory, Jezebel and The Little Foxes, much to Bankhead's chagrin. Bankhead and Davis were considered to be somewhat similar in style. Several decades later Davis called Channing "the essence of a Tallulah Bankhead kind of actress" in an interview with Barbara Walters. The production is notable in that Mary Orr, of The Wisdom of Eve, played the role of Karen Richards. The cast also featured Alan Hewitt as Addison DeWitt (who narrated), Beatrice Pearson as Eve Harrington, Don Briggs as Lloyd Richards, Kevin McCarthy as Bill Simpson, Florence Robinson as Birdie Coonan, and Stefan Schnabel as Max Fabian.

In 1970, All About Eve was the inspiration for the stage musical Applause, with book by Betty Comden and Adolph Green, lyrics by Lee Adams, and music by Charles Strouse. The original production starred Lauren Bacall as Margo Channing, and it won the Tony Award for Best Musical that season. It ran for four previews and 896 performances at the Palace Theatre on Broadway. After Bacall left the production, she was replaced by Anne Baxter in the role of Margo Channing.

In 2019, a stage adaptation of All About Eve premiered at the Noël Coward Theatre in London, directed by Ivo van Hove and starring Gillian Anderson as Margo Channing, Julian Ovenden as Bill, and Lily James as Eve Harrington.

== In popular culture ==
- The plot of the film has been recycled numerous times, frequently as an outright homage to the film, with one notable example being a 1974 episode of The Mary Tyler Moore Show titled "A New Sue Ann". In the episode, Sue Ann Nivens (Betty White), hostess of a popular local cooking show, hires a young, pretty, and very eager fan (Linda Kelsey) as her apprentice and assistant, but the neophyte quickly begins to sabotage her mentor in an attempt to replace her as host of the show. Sue Ann, unlike Margo Channing, prevails in the end and counters the young woman's attempts to steal her success before sending her on her way.
- Brazilian telenovela Celebridade was loosely based on the plot; it features Malu Mader as the successful businesswoman and former model Maria Clara Diniz, who hires Laura Prudente da Costa (Cláudia Abreu) for a job in her company after she saves her life and claims to be her greatest fan — but she is, in fact, an imposter who wants not only to take everything from the other woman, but to become a new Maria Clara.
- The English rock band All About Eve took their name from the film.
- Steven Soderbergh's 2012 film Magic Mike is a loose re-working of the All About Eve plot and includes subtle references in homage to the original. The lead actor Channing Tatum name checks Bette Davis's character Margo Channing, and instead of Eve, the ambitious young upstart is named Adam, played by Alex Pettyfer. Like Eve, Adam gets his stage debut filling in for an absent star, and his subsequent ruthless rise to glory at the expense of others mirrors that of Eve.
- A 2008 episode of The Simpsons titled "All About Lisa" is influenced by this film. In the episode, Lisa Simpson becomes Krusty the Clown's assistant, eventually taking his place on television and receiving an entertainment award.
- Pedro Almodóvar's 1999 Academy Award-winning Spanish-language film Todo sobre mi madre (All About My Mother) has elements similar to those found in All About Eve. The title of the film itself is an homage to the 1950 film.
- In the fifth season of The L Word, a fan becomes Jenny Schecter's assistant while she is directing a movie; later the fan blackmails the movie studio into letting her direct and she proceeds to take over Jenny's life.
- In the third season of Gilligan's Island, the episode "All About Eva" concerns the character of Eva Grubb coming on the island and taking over Ginger's persona, with both roles played by actress Tina Louise.
- The season 20 episode of Family Guy titled "All About Alana" is a homage to the film and sees Lois Griffin allowing one of her piano students Alana Fitzgerald to move in with the family, who begins slowly taking over Lois' life.
- The 2021 release of the collaborative album A Beginner's Mind by Sufjan Stevens and Angelo De Augustine features a song titled "Lady Macbeth in Chains," which was inspired by the film.
- The film was a direct influence on a professional wrestling storyline in All Elite Wrestling (AEW) from 2023 to 2025, in which Mariah May debuted as a superfan and later protegé of "Timeless" Toni Storm (whose character is a classical Hollywood actress based on Sunset Boulevard), only to betray Storm and reveal herself as a villain whose plan all along was to supplant Storm as the AEW Women's World Champion. Storm's gimmick was named 2025's Wrestling Observer Award for Best Gimmick.
- All About Eve influenced Lucile Hadžihalilović's 2025 fantasy drama film The Ice Tower. Hadžihalilović said: "While not a conscious inspiration, the parallels with The Ice Tower are undeniable—the accomplished actress, the adoring young admirer. I've watched it a few times and loved it. Maybe it crept in subconsciously, shaping things without me even realizing."

== See also ==
- List of cult films

== Bibliography ==
- Behlmer, Rudy (1990). Behind the Scenes: The Making Of... Samuel French. ISBN 978-0-573-60600-7.
- Davis, Bette (1962). The Lonely Life: An Autobiography. New York: G. P. Putnam's Sons. ISBN 978-1-121-96124-1.
- Geist, Kenneth L. (1978). Pictures Will Talk: The Life and Films of Joseph L. Mankiewicz. New York: Scribners. ISBN 0-684-15500-1.
- Gussow, Mel (1971). Don't Say Yes Until I Finish Talking: A Biography of Darryl F. Zanuck. Garden City: Doubleday. ISBN 978-0-671-78129-3.
- Mankiewicz, Joseph L.; Carey, Gary (1972). More About 'All About Eve'. New York: Random House. ISBN 978-0-394-48248-4.
- Mankiewicz, Joseph L. (October 16, 1972). "All About the Women in 'All About Eve'". New York. Vol. 5, no. 42. pp. 37–42. ISSN 0028-7369.
- Sikov, Ed (2008). Dark Victory: The Life of Bette Davis. New York: Macmillan. ISBN 978-0-8050-8863-2.
- Solomon, Aubrey (1988). Twentieth Century Fox: A Corporate and Financial History. Lanham, Maryland: Scarecrow Press. ISBN 978-0-810-84244-1. OCLC 856785920.
- Staggs, Sam (2000). All About 'All About Eve': The Complete Behind-the-Scenes Story of the Bitchiest Film Ever Made. New York: St. Martin's Press. ISBN 978-0-312-25268-7.
- Stern, Sydney Ladensohn (2019). The Brothers Mankiewicz: Hope, Heartbreak, and Hollywood Classics. University Press of Mississippi. ISBN 978-1-617-03267-7.
