= 4th British Academy Film Awards =

1951 film awards ceremony

- Date: 22 February 1951
- Site: Odeon Theatre, Leicester Square, London

Highlights
- Best Film: All About Eve
- Best British Film: The Blue Lamp
- Most awards: All About Eve, The Blue Lamp, Intruder in the Dust (1)
- Most nominations: Intruder in the Dust (2)

The 4th British Academy Film Awards, given by the British Academy of Film and Television Arts and honoured the best films of 1950.

All About Eve won the award for Best Film.

== Winners and nominees ==
Winners are listed first and highlighted in boldface; the nominees are listed below alphabetically and not in boldface.

Best British Film	Best Film from any Source
**The Blue Lamp**; Chance of a Lifetime; Morning Departure; Seven Days to Noon; State Secret; The Wooden Horse	**All About Eve (United States)**; La Beauté du diable (Italy, France); The Asphalt Jungle (United States); Intruder in the Dust (United States); The Men (United States); On the Town (United States); Orphee (France)
Best Documentary	Special Award for Film
**The Undefeated**; Inland Waterways; Kon-Tiki; Life Begins Tomorrow (La Vie Commence Demain); The Mountain is Green (La Montagne est Vert); Seal Island; The Vatican	**The True Fact of Japan - This Modern Age**; The Charms of Life (Les Charmes de L'existence); The Magic Canvas; Medieval Castles; Muscle Beach; Scrapbook for 1933; Sound
United Nations Award
**Intruder in the Dust**; The Dividing Line; The Mountain is Green (La Montagne est Vert)

== See also ==
- 8th Golden Globe Awards
- 23rd Academy Awards
