= The Asphalt Jungle =

1950 film by John Huston

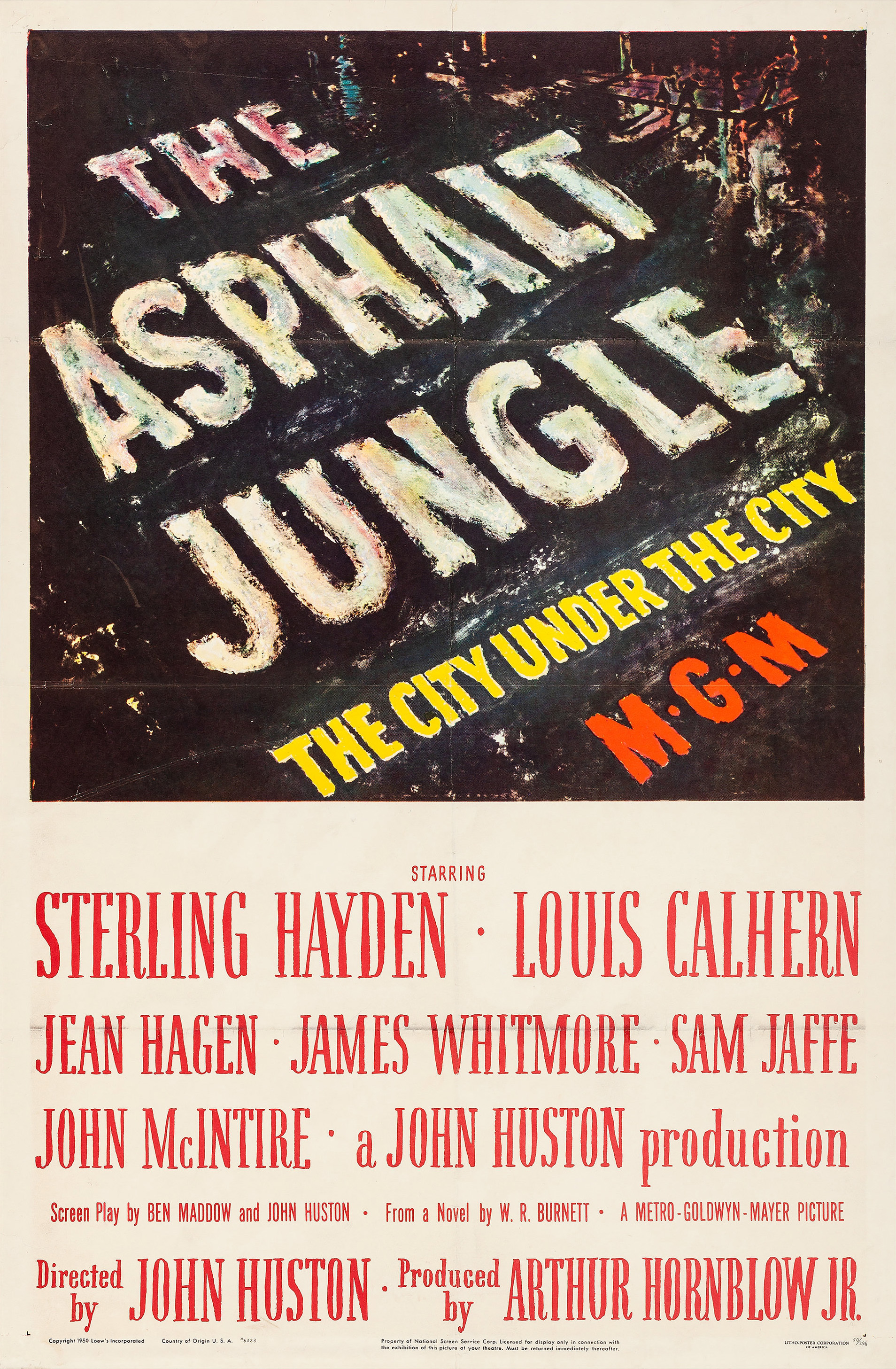
- Theatrical release poster
- Directed by: John Huston
- Screenplay by: Ben Maddow; John Huston
- Based on: The Asphalt Jungle (1949 novel) by W. R. Burnett
- Produced by: Arthur Hornblow Jr.
- Starring: Sterling Hayden; Louis Calhern; Jean Hagen; James Whitmore; Sam Jaffe; John McIntire
- Cinematography: Harold Rosson
- Edited by: George Boemler
- Music by: Miklós Rózsa
- Production company: Metro-Goldwyn-Mayer
- Distributed by: Loew's Inc.
- Release date: May 12, 1950 (US)
- Running time: 112 minutes
- Country: United States
- Language: English
- Budget: $1.2 million
- Box office: $2.1 million

The Asphalt Jungle is a 1950 American heist film noir directed by John Huston, from a screenplay co-written with Ben Maddow. It stars Sterling Hayden, Louis Calhern, Jean Hagen, James Whitmore, Sam Jaffe, John McIntire and Marilyn Monroe in one of her earliest roles. Based on the 1949 novel by W. R. Burnett, it tells the story of a jewel robbery in a Midwestern city.

Produced and distributed by Metro-Goldwyn-Mayer, the film was released on May 12, 1950. It was nominated for four Academy Awards, including Best Director and Best Adapted Screenplay, and Huston won a National Board of Review Award for his direction. At the 1950 Venice Film Festival, Huston was nominated for the Golden Lion and Sam Jaffe won the Best Actor Award.

Retrospective reviews of the film have been highly positive, with several critics describing it as one of the most influential works in the crime film genre, and one of Huston's best films. The film spawned a television series that aired on ABC in 1961.

In 2008, The Asphalt Jungle was selected for preservation in the United States National Film Registry by the Library of Congress as being "culturally, historically, or aesthetically significant".

== Plot ==
Criminal mastermind "Doc" Erwin Riedenschneider, freshly released from prison, visits a bookie named Cobby in an unnamed Midwestern river city to plan a jewel robbery. He seeks $50,000 to hire three men—a safecracker, a driver and a hooligan. Cobby arranges a meeting between Doc and Alonzo Emmerich, a high-society lawyer and known fixer. Doc tells Emmerich that the theft will yield half a million dollars or more. Emmerich agrees to front the money and find a fence. Private detective Bob Brannom visits Emmerich to collect debts, but Emmerich is near bankruptcy and convinces Brannom to help him double-cross the others, proposing a scheme for him to abscond with the gems.

Doc secures Louie Ciavelli as the safecracker. Ciavelli suggests Gus Minissi, a hunchbacked diner owner, to be the getaway driver. Last hired is Dix Handley, who tells his girlfriend Doll Conovan of his dream to buy back the Kentucky horse farm that his family had lost after a terrible year. On the night of the heist, Ciavelli hammers through a brick wall to access the jewelry store, deactivates an alarm to admit Doc and Dix, and uses nitroglycerine to open the safe. However, the explosion inadvertently triggers several burglar alarms in nearby buildings. When Dix slugs a security guard, the guard's revolver goes off, striking Ciavelli in the abdomen. The men escape and a police manhunt begins.

Gus takes Ciavelli home at the latter's insistence. Ciavelli's wife Maria wants him taken to the hospital; Gus sends for a trusted but illicit doctor instead. Doc and Dix arrive at Emmerich's place, but are aware of Emmerich's attempt to stall them. Brannom draws a gun and is killed by Dix, who receives a flesh wound in his side. Doc scolds Emmerich for his foolish plan and tells him to offer the money to the jeweler's insurance company for 25% of its value to avoid suspicion.

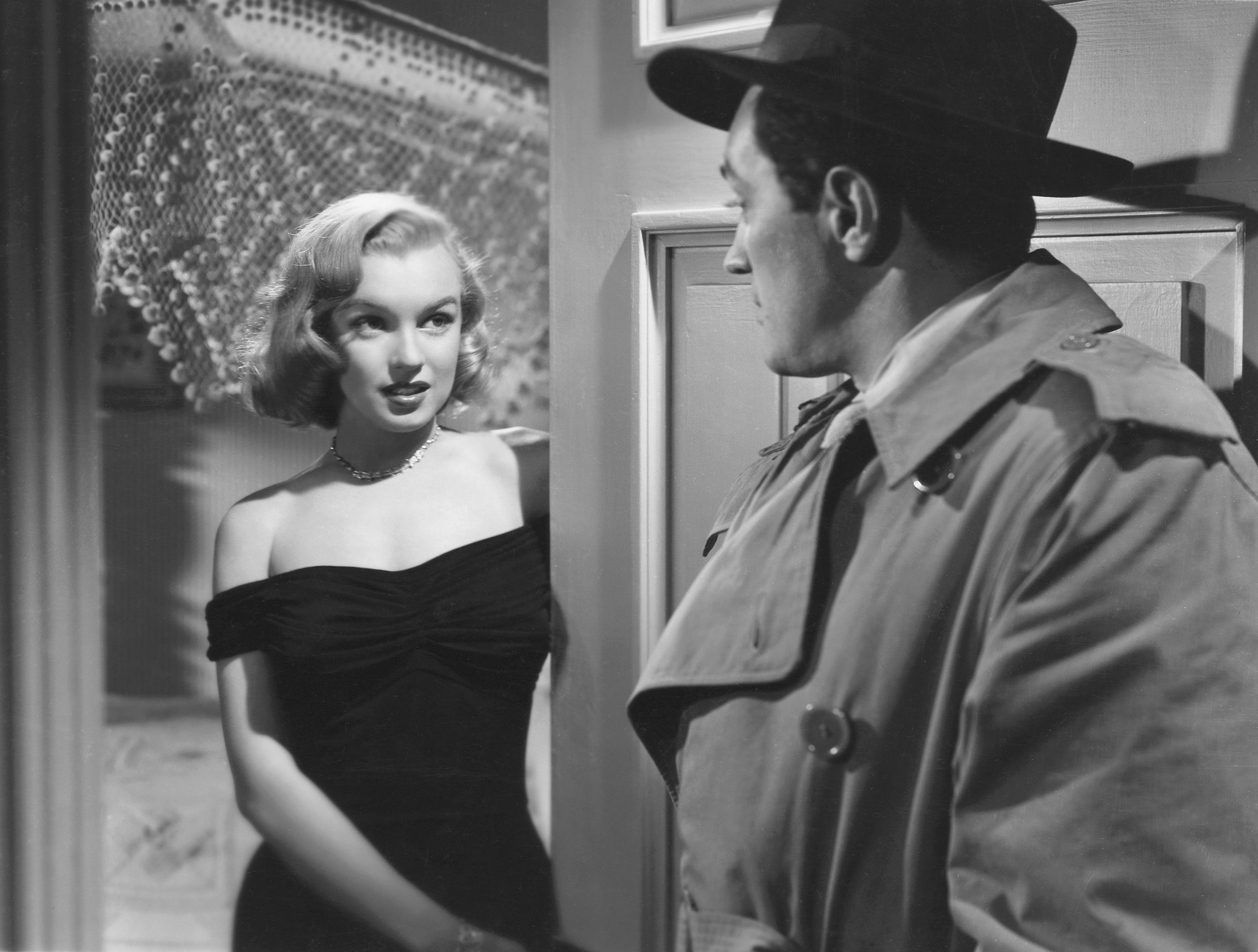
Marilyn Monroe in her breakout role as Angela Phinlay

Emmerich dumps Brannom's body in the river. After finding a list of debtors on Emmerich's letterhead on the corpse, the police question Emmerich, who claims that he spent the night with his mistress, Angela Phinlay. Corrupt police lieutenant Ditrich—on Cobby's payroll and fearing scrutiny by Police Commissioner Hardy—vainly attempts to save himself from ensnarement by beating Cobby into a confession. Commissioner Hardy arrests Emmerich at Angela's home and threatens her with jail for providing a false alibi. When the police allow Emmerich to leave the room to phone his wife, he shoots himself dead.

After Gus is arrested, he attacks Cobby in the jail. The police go to Ciavelli's to arrest him, only to find his funeral in progress. At Doll's apartment, Doc offers Dix some of the stones; he refuses, wanting only to go home. Doc persuades a taxi driver to drive him to Cleveland, but when they stop at a roadside diner, he becomes entranced by a pretty young woman dancing to the jukebox. Due to the delay, Doc is recognized by two policemen, who arrest him after finding the stolen jewels hidden in his overcoat. Doll secures a car for Dix and insists on accompanying him, but Dix faints at the wheel due to blood loss. Doll takes Dix to a doctor, who phones the local police to report a gunshot wound. Dix regains consciousness and escapes.

At a press conference, Hardy notes that three of the seven suspects have died, three others have been arrested and the one on the loose is a hardened killer. Back at the wheel, the rolling green fields of Bluegrass country pass as Dix speaks deliriously. Arriving at his childhood pasture, he finally succumbs to his wounds. Doll runs for help, while horses gather around his collapsed remains.

== Cast ==
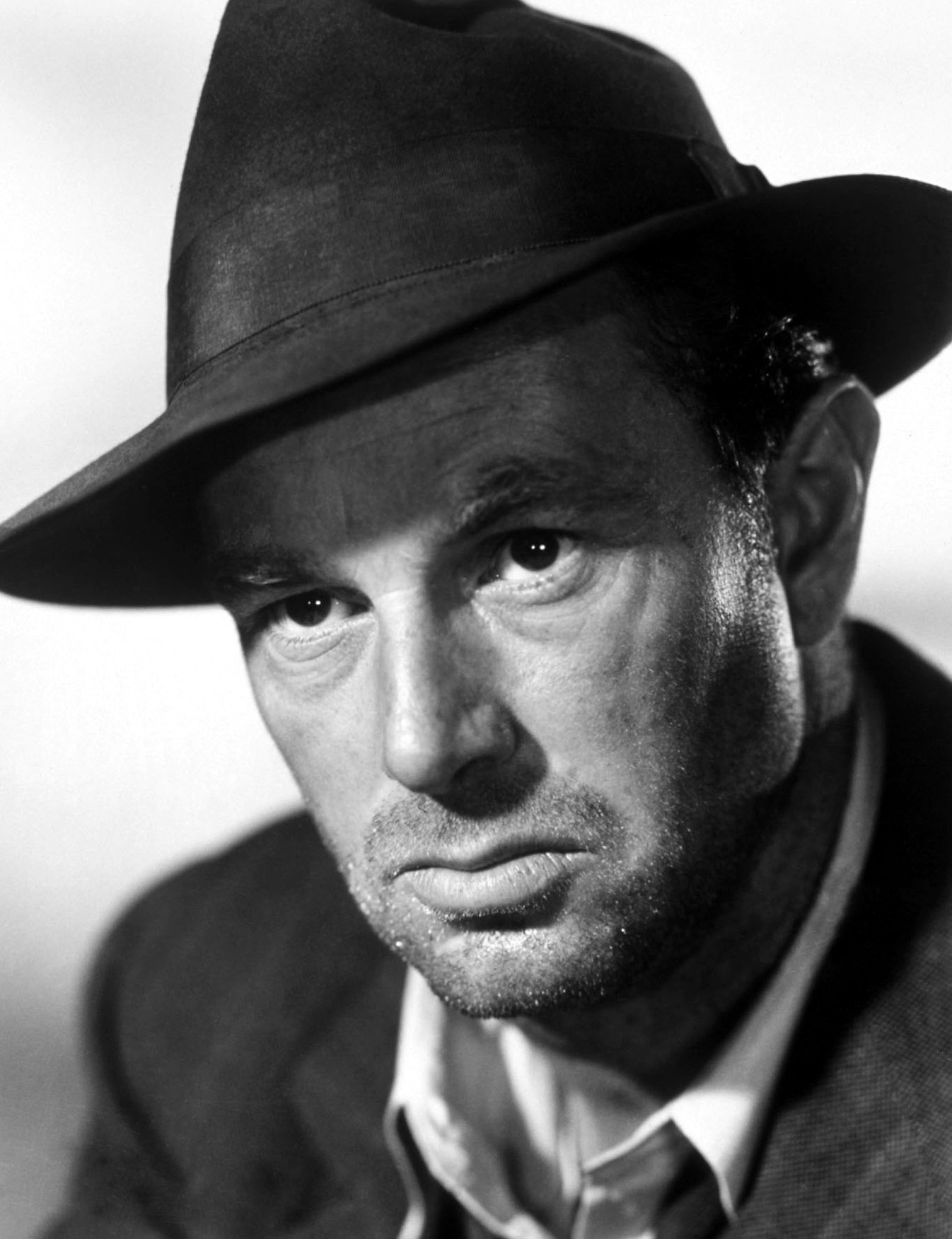
Sterling Hayden in a studio publicity photo as Dix Handley, the film's protagonist

- Sterling Hayden as Dix Handley
- Louis Calhern as Alonzo D. Emmerich
- Jean Hagen as "Doll" Conovan
- James Whitmore as Gus Minissi
- Sam Jaffe as "Doc" Erwin Riedenschneider
- John McIntire as Police Commissioner Hardy
- Marc Lawrence as Cobby
- Barry Kelley as Lt. Ditrich
- Anthony Caruso as Louis Ciavelli
- Teresa Celli as Maria Ciavelli
- Marilyn Monroe as Angela Phinlay
- William "Wee Willie" Davis as Timmons
- Dorothy Tree as May Emmerich
- Brad Dexter as Bob Brannom
- John Maxwell as Dr. Swanson
- Alex Gerry as Maxwell
- Tom Browne Henry as James X. Connery
- Don Haggerty as Detective Andrews
- James Seay as Detective Janocek
- Albert Morin as Eddie Donato
- Henry Rowland as Franz Schurz
- Helene Stanley as Jeannie
- David Clarke as Mr. Atkinson
- Raymond Roe as Tallboy
- Chuck Courtney as Red
- Henry Corden as Karl Anton Smith
- Strother Martin as William Doldy

== Production ==
=== Development and casting ===
The film was an adaptation by director John Huston and screenwriter Ben Maddow of the 1949 novel by crime writer W. R. Burnett. It was backed by the major film studio Metro-Goldwyn-Mayer, where it was greenlighted by production chief Dore Schary over the objections of studio head Louis B. Mayer. From the publication of Burnett's first novel Little Caesar in 1929, he had written numerous books that were adapted into films shortly after publication. Huston and Maddow wrote the adaptation, which emphasized the crooks' story and reduced the police procedural aspect. Burnett was consulted as the shooting script was being written, and he approved the final version. The studio allowed the production a relatively free hand.

Maddow said: "[A] lot of the power [of the film] was due to the fact that these were New York actors who all knew one another and were trying to outdo one another—and who were stimulants to one another. There was nobody who had a name of any consequence... Most of Huston's talent came in the choice of casting, which most directors will tell you anyway, in moments of frankness. It could have been quite a banal film if badly cast. Imagine Van Johnson or somebody else in the leading part! But it was not an important film, so it was easier to cast."

Huston's first choice for the breakout role of Angela Phinlay played by Marilyn Monroe was Lola Albright, who was unavailable. Huston invited Monroe to a screen test and rehearsed for it with her in his office. He did not feel that she was right for the part and dismissed her, but changed his mind when he watched her leave the room. According to film noir authority Eddie Muller, Huston later said that Monroe was "one of the few actresses who could make an entrance by leaving the room."

The film includes the screen debut of Strother Martin, who had an uncredited part as a man in a police lineup.

=== Filming ===
Burnett's original novel was set in an unnamed Midwestern river city, partly patterned after Cincinnati, Ohio. Huston and his cinematographer Harold Rosson scouted locations in Cincinnati and St. Louis, but ultimately decided to shoot most of the film in Los Angeles, with the exception of the film's opening and closing scenes.

The opening sequence of Dix Handley evading police was filmed on-location in Cincinnati, with various local landmarks visible, such as the John A. Roebling Suspension Bridge, Carew Tower, and Fourth and Vine Tower. The final scene was shot at Keeneland in Lexington, Kentucky. The rest of the film was shot either in Los Angeles or at MGM's Culver City studios.

In shooting the film, Huston was influenced by European/Italian neorealist films such as Open City (1945) and Bicycle Thieves (1948). He combined the naturalism of neorealism with the stylized look of film noir and Hollywood crime films. Most of the film was shot on a 35mm lens.

When the film was complete, Mayer said: "It's trash. That Asphalt Pavement thing is full of nasty, ugly people doing nasty things. I wouldn't cross the street to see a picture like that."

=== Censorship ===
The Production Code Administration's main concerns with the script were the detailed depiction of the heist and the fact that the character of the corrupt lawyer Alonzo Emmerich (Louis Calhern, who would later star in Annie Get Your Gun (1950)) seemed to cheat justice by killing himself. Neither the studio nor the censors interfered significantly with the script, however, and both the heist and the suicide were included in the final cut, although the suicide scene was rewritten. The original scene had Emmerich finishing a suicide note, but in the revised scene, he stalls after writing an endearing salutation to his wife May (Dorothy Tree), crumples the note and becomes extremely agitated about the decision to kill himself before an abrupt cutaway to an offscreen shot being heard.

== Reception ==
Advertisement for the film's screening at the Colonial Theater in Allentown, Pennsylvania.

=== Box office ===
According to MGM records, the film earned $1,077,000 in the U.S. and Canada and $1,060,000 worldwide, resulting in a brief profit of only $40,000.

=== Critical response ===
A contemporary review in Photoplay stated:

This brutally frank story of crime and punishment in a Midwestern city was directed by two-time Academy Award winner, John Huston—son of the late Walter Huston. John's pictures are usually grim (The Treasure of the Sierra Madre), but always dramatic and exciting. This time he exposes the behind-the-scenes details of the robbery of a jewelry store... This picture is packed with stand-out performances... There's a beautiful blonde, too, name of Marilyn Monroe, who plays Calhern's girl friend, and makes the most of her footage.

The Brooklyn Eagle's review was highly complimentary: "It's a smash picture....Sterling Hayden, Louis Calhern, Sam Jaffe and Marc Lawrence are four standout members of the cast...which has an entirely brilliant lineup of players....It goes off like clockwork, in a series of tense scenes that have the audience clutching their chair arms."

At the time of its release The New York Times said of the film:

Louis Calhern as the big lawyer who tries to pull a double cross and muffs it is exceptionally fluid and adroit and Sterling Hayden is sure-fire as a brazen hoodlum who just wants to go back home. Likewise Sam Jaffe does wonders as a cool-headed mastermind, James Whitmore is taut as a small 'fixer' and John McIntire is crisp as a chief of police. But, then, everyone in the picture—which was produced incidentally, by M.G.M.—gives an unimpeachable performance. If only it all weren't so corrupt.

In 1988, the Criterion Collection critic Peter Heath Becker admired Huston's technique:

Through his experience as a painter, [Huston] learned to frame an image, and throughout the film, he uses one shot where other directors might have needed three. He dispenses with editing flourishes and over-dramatic lighting and opts instead for sustained, well-composed shots. By balancing elements in the foreground and background of his images, Huston frames events and responses at once, without cutting between them.

Eddie Muller noted that the film "gave an injection of realism to the postwar crime picture. Instead of the snarling miscreants seen in hundreds of gangster shoot-'em-ups, The Asphalt Jungle offered an underworld of struggling laborers, alienated loners, even honorable family men—in addition to garden-variety leeches and shysters. These were neorealist thieves, after bigger scores than bicycles."

On the review aggregator website Rotten Tomatoes, 98% of 40 critics' reviews are positive. The website's consensus reads: "The Asphalt Jungle is an expertly told crime story with attention paid to the crime and characters in equal measure."

Metacritic, which uses a weighted average, assigned the film a score of 85 out of 100, based on 15 critics, indicating "universal acclaim".

=== Awards and nominations ===
Institution	Year	Category	Nominee(s)	Result
Academy Awards	1951	Best Director	John Huston	Nominated
Academy Awards	1951	Best Adapted Screenplay	Ben Maddow, John Huston	Nominated
Academy Awards	1951	Best Actor in a Supporting Role	Sam Jaffe	Nominated
Academy Awards	1951	Best Cinematography – Black-and-white	Harold Rosson	Nominated
British Academy Film Awards	1951	Best Film from any Source		Nominated
Directors Guild of America Award	1950	Outstanding Achievement in Feature Film	John Huston	Nominated
Edgar Allan Poe Awards	1951	Best Motion Picture Screenplay	Ben Maddow, John Huston	Won
Golden Globe Award	1951	Best Director	John Huston	Nominated
Golden Globe Award	1951	Best Cinematography	Harold Rosson	Nominated
Golden Globe Award	1951	Best Screenplay	Ben Maddow, John Huston	Nominated
National Board of Review	1950	Best Director	John Huston	Won
Venice Film Festival	1950	Golden Lion		Nominated
Venice Film Festival	1950	Best Actor	Sam Jaffe	Won
Writers Guild of America Award	1951	Best Written Drama	Ben Maddow, John Huston	Nominated
Writers Guild of America Award	1951	Writers Guild of America Award for Best Written Film Concerning American Scene	Ben Maddow, John Huston	Nominated

== Television series ==
The film spawned a television series of the same name starring Jack Warden, Arch Johnson and William Smith, which ran for 13 episodes in the spring and summer of 1961 on ABC. The series resembled the film in name only, except for one episode, "The Professor", which was constructed as a sequel to the feature film. None of the characters in the film appeared in the series, and the plots were devoted to the exploits of the major case squad of the New York Police Department. One of the most notable features of the series is the theme song, written by Duke Ellington.

== Legacy ==
Over time The Asphalt Jungle has become to be regarded as one of the more influential crime films of the 1950s. According to the AFI Film Catalog, the film "is widely regarded by film critics as one of John Huston's best."

Burnett's novel The Asphalt Jungle was the basis of M-G-M's western film The Badlanders (1958) directed by Delmer Daves, as well as Cairo (1963) starring George Sanders, followed by the blaxploitation film Cool Breeze (1972), directed by Barry Pollack.

The Asphalt Jungle further developed the crime thriller subgenre of caper films. The 1955 French film Rififi, which critics such as Leonard Maltin have labeled as the best heist film ever, drew much inspiration from The Asphalt Jungle, although Jules Dassin contended in later years that he did not see the film until after he made Rififi.

In 2008, The Asphalt Jungle was selected for preservation in the United States National Film Registry by the Library of Congress as being "culturally, historically, or aesthetically significant".

== Colorization dispute ==
Like with Citizen Kane (1941), The Asphalt Jungle was the subject of a colorization lawsuit and controversy in France. Turner Entertainment entered into an agreement with the French television channel La Cinq, to broadcast the film in artificially colorized form. John Huston's heirs objected and filed a lawsuit. On November 23, 1988, The Asphalt Jungle was prohibited from being broadcast in France. On July 6, 1989, La Cinq won on appeal, broadcasting the film on August 6, 1989. Finally in Turner Entertainment Co. v. Huston, on May 28, 1991, the Court of Cassation canceled the July 6 judgment, stating that colorizing the film transformed the original artwork enough to potentially transgress the author's moral rights.
