= 3rd Directors Guild of America Awards =

- Date: 1951
- Country: United States
- Presented by: Directors Guild of America

Highlights
- Best Director Feature Film: All About Eve – Joseph L. Mankiewicz
- Website: https://www.dga.org/Awards/History/1950s/1950.aspx?value=1950

The 3rd Directors Guild of America Awards, honoring the outstanding directorial achievements in film in 1950, were presented in 1951.

== Winners and nominees ==
=== Film ===
Feature Film

Joseph L. Mankiewicz – All About Eve

- John Huston – The Asphalt Jungle
- Vincente Minnelli – Father's Little Dividend
- Billy Wilder – Sunset Boulevard

=== Special awards ===
Honorary Life Member Recipient

J. P. McGowan
