= 1950 New York Film Critics Circle Awards =

16th New York Film Critics Circle Awards

16th New York Film Critics Circle Awards

January 28, 1951
(announced December 27, 1950)

All About Eve

The 16th New York Film Critics Circle Awards, honored the best filmmaking of 1950.

== Winners ==
- Best Film:
  - All About Eve
- Best Actor:
  - Gregory Peck - Twelve O'Clock High
- Best Actress:
  - Bette Davis - All About Eve
- Best Directors:
  - Joseph L. Mankiewicz - All About Eve
- Best Foreign Language Film:
  - L'Amore • Italy
