= Writers Guild of America Awards =

Award for film, television, radio and video game writing

Writers Guild Awards
- Current: 78th Writers Guild of America Awards
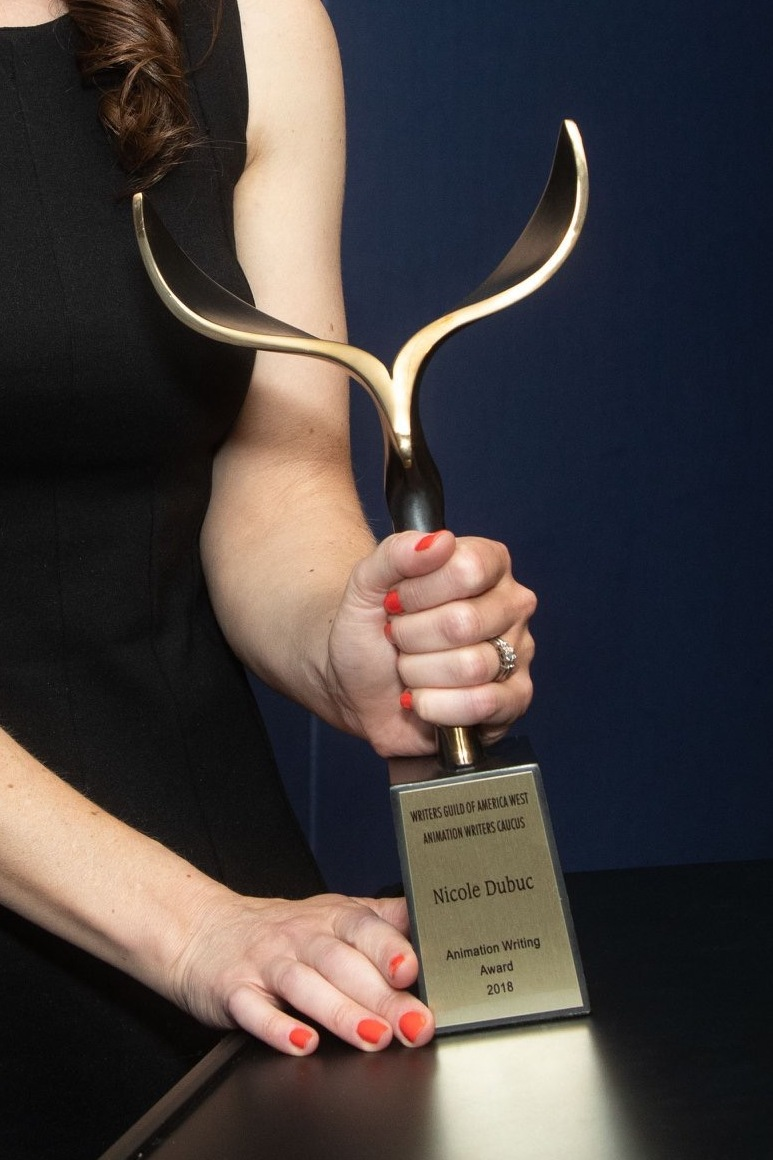
- The trophy
- Awarded for: Writing achievements in film and other media
- Country: United States
- Presented by: Writers Guild of America East; Writers Guild of America West
- First award: 1949; 77 years ago
- Website: awards.wga.org

The Writers Guild of America Awards is an award for film, television, and radio writing including both fiction and non-fiction categories given by the Writers Guild of America East and Writers Guild of America West since 1949.

== Eligibility ==
The screen awards are for films that were exhibited theatrically during the preceding calendar year. The television awards are for series that were produced and aired between December 1 and November 30, regardless of how many episodes aired during this time period.

Additionally, scripts must be produced under the jurisdiction of the WGA or under a collective bargaining agreement in Canada, Ireland, New Zealand, or the United Kingdom.

== Lifetime achievement awards ==
Each year at the awards, two lifetime achievement awards are presented. One is for screenwriting, and the other is for TV writing:

- Laurel Award for TV Writing Achievement
- Laurel Award for Screenwriting Achievement

== Categories ==
(As of 2023)

Film

- Best Adapted Screenplay
- Best Original Screenplay
- Best Documentary Screenplay

Television

- Comedy Series
- Drama Series
- Episodic Comedy
- Episodic Drama
- Long Form – Adapted
- Long Form – Original
- Short Form New Media
- New Series
- Animation
- Comedy/Variety Talk Series
- Comedy/Variety – Sketch Series
- Best Comedy/Variety – Specials
- Daytime Serials
- Children's Script
- Best Quiz and Audience
- Documentary Script – Current Events
- Documentary Script – Other Than Current Events

News

- TV News Script – Regularly Scheduled, Bulletin, or Breaking Report
- TV News Script – Analysis, Feature, or Commentary
- Digital News

Radio

- Radio News Script – Regularly Scheduled, Bulletin, or Breaking Report
- Radio News Script – Analysis, Feature or Commentary
- Radio Documentary

== History ==
In 2004, the awards show was broadcast on television for the first time.

In the years 2008 through 2018, the awards also included video game writing.

In February 2026, the staff of the Writers Guild of America West, who have been bargaining with Guild Management over a first union contract, went on strike. On February 24, Guild Management threatened to shut down the awards show the following month if the staff union did not accept their last, best, and final offer by February 27.

=== Discontinued categories ===
- Best Written Musical (1949–1969)
- Best Written Western (1949–1951)
- Best Written Film Concerning American Scene (1949–1952)
- Best Written Drama (1949–1969)
  - Best Drama Written Directly for the Screenplay (1970–1984)
  - Best Drama Adapted from Another Media (1970–1984)
- Best Written Comedy (1949–1969)
  - Best Comedy Written Directly for the Screenplay (1970–1984)
  - Best Comedy Adapted from Another Media (1970–1984)
- Best Videogame Writing (2008–2018)

== Ceremonies ==
- 1st Writers Guild of America Awards
- 2nd Writers Guild of America Awards
- 3rd Writers Guild of America Awards
- 4th Writers Guild of America Awards
- 5th Writers Guild of America Awards
- 6th Writers Guild of America Awards
- 7th Writers Guild of America Awards
- 8th Writers Guild of America Awards
- 9th Writers Guild of America Awards
- 10th Writers Guild of America Awards
- 11th Writers Guild of America Awards
- 12th Writers Guild of America Awards
- 13th Writers Guild of America Awards
- 14th Writers Guild of America Awards
- 15th Writers Guild of America Awards
- 16th Writers Guild of America Awards
- 17th Writers Guild of America Awards
- 18th Writers Guild of America Awards
- 19th Writers Guild of America Awards
- 20th Writers Guild of America Awards
- 21st Writers Guild of America Awards
- 22nd Writers Guild of America Awards
- 23rd Writers Guild of America Awards
- 24th Writers Guild of America Awards
- 25th Writers Guild of America Awards
- 26th Writers Guild of America Awards
- 27th Writers Guild of America Awards
- 28th Writers Guild of America Awards
- 29th Writers Guild of America Awards
- 30th Writers Guild of America Awards
- 31st Writers Guild of America Awards
- 32nd Writers Guild of America Awards
- 33rd Writers Guild of America Awards
- 34th Writers Guild of America Awards
- 35th Writers Guild of America Awards
- 36th Writers Guild of America Awards
- 37th Writers Guild of America Awards
- 38th Writers Guild of America Awards
- 39th Writers Guild of America Awards
- 40th Writers Guild of America Awards
- 41st Writers Guild of America Awards
- 42nd Writers Guild of America Awards
- 43rd Writers Guild of America Awards
- 44th Writers Guild of America Awards
- 45th Writers Guild of America Awards
- 46th Writers Guild of America Awards
- 47th Writers Guild of America Awards
- 48th Writers Guild of America Awards
- 49th Writers Guild of America Awards
- 50th Writers Guild of America Awards
- 51st Writers Guild of America Awards
- 52nd Writers Guild of America Awards
- 53rd Writers Guild of America Awards
- 54th Writers Guild of America Awards
- 55th Writers Guild of America Awards
- 56th Writers Guild of America Awards
- 57th Writers Guild of America Awards
- 58th Writers Guild of America Awards
- 59th Writers Guild of America Awards
- 60th Writers Guild of America Awards
- 61st Writers Guild of America Awards
- 62nd Writers Guild of America Awards
- 63rd Writers Guild of America Awards
- 64th Writers Guild of America Awards
- 65th Writers Guild of America Awards
- 66th Writers Guild of America Awards
- 67th Writers Guild of America Awards
- 68th Writers Guild of America Awards
- 69th Writers Guild of America Awards
- 70th Writers Guild of America Awards
- 71st Writers Guild of America Awards
- 72nd Writers Guild of America Awards
- 73rd Writers Guild of America Awards
- 74th Writers Guild of America Awards
- 75th Writers Guild of America Awards
- 76th Writers Guild of America Awards
- 77th Writers Guild of America Awards
- 78th Writers Guild of America Awards

== Winners ==
A * denotes a film that also went on to win an Academy Award.

=== Films ===
Best Original Screenplay

- 1967: Bonnie and Clyde – David Newman and Robert Benton
- 1968: The Producers – Mel Brooks *
- 1984: Broadway Danny Rose – Woody Allen
- 1985: Witness – Pamela Wallace, William Kelley, and Earl W. Wallace *
- 1986: Hannah and Her Sisters – Woody Allen *
- 1987: Moonstruck – John Patrick Shanley *
- 1988: Bull Durham – Ron Shelton
- 1989: Crimes and Misdemeanors – Woody Allen
- 1990: Avalon – Barry Levinson
- 1991: Thelma & Louise – Callie Khouri *
- 1992: The Crying Game – Neil Jordan *
- 1993: The Piano – Jane Campion *
- 1994: Four Weddings and a Funeral – Richard Curtis
- 1995: Braveheart – Randall Wallace
- 1996: Fargo – Joel Coen and Ethan Coen *
- 1997: As Good as It Gets – Mark Andrus and James L. Brooks
- 1998: Shakespeare in Love – Marc Norman and Tom Stoppard *
- 1999: American Beauty – Alan Ball *
- 2000: You Can Count on Me – Kenneth Lonergan
- 2001: Gosford Park – Julian Fellowes *
- 2002: Bowling for Columbine – Michael Moore
- 2003: Lost in Translation – Sofia Coppola *
- 2004: Eternal Sunshine of the Spotless Mind – Charlie Kaufman, Michael Gondry, and Pierre Bismuth *
- 2005: Crash – Paul Haggis and Bobby Moresco *
- 2006: Little Miss Sunshine – Michael Arndt *
- 2007: Juno – Diablo Cody *
- 2008: Milk – Dustin Lance Black *
- 2009: The Hurt Locker – Mark Boal *
- 2010: Inception – Christopher Nolan
- 2011: Midnight in Paris – Woody Allen *
- 2012: Zero Dark Thirty – Mark Boal
- 2013: Her – Spike Jonze *
- 2014: The Grand Budapest Hotel – Wes Anderson and Hugo Guinness
- 2015: Spotlight – Tom McCarthy and Josh Singer *
- 2016: Moonlight – Barry Jenkins; story by Tarell Alvin McCraney *
- 2017: Get Out – Jordan Peele *
- 2018: Eighth Grade – Bo Burnham
- 2019: Parasite – Bong Joon-ho and Han Jin-won; story by Bong Joon-ho *
- 2020: Promising Young Woman — Emerald Fennell *
- 2021: Don't Look Up — Adam McKay and David Sirota
- 2022: Everything Everywhere All at Once — Daniel Kwan and Daniel Scheinert *
- 2023: The Holdovers — David Hemingson
- 2024: Anora — Sean Baker *
- 2025: Sinners — Ryan Coogler *

Best Adapted Screenplay

- 1984: The Killing Fields – Bruce Robinson
- 1985: Prizzi's Honor – Richard Condon and Janet Roach
- 1986: A Room with a View – Ruth Prawer Jhabvala *
- 1987: Roxanne – Steve Martin
- 1988: Dangerous Liaisons – Christopher Hampton *
- 1989: Driving Miss Daisy – Alfred Uhry *
- 1990: Dances with Wolves – Michael Blake *
- 1991: The Silence of the Lambs – Ted Tally *
- 1992: The Player – Michael Tolkin
- 1993: Schindler's List – Steven Zaillian *
- 1994: Forrest Gump – Eric Roth *
- 1995: Sense and Sensibility – Emma Thompson *
- 1996: Sling Blade – Billy Bob Thornton *
- 1997: L.A. Confidential – Brian Helgeland and Curtis Hanson *
- 1998: Out of Sight – Scott Frank
- 1999: Election – Alexander Payne and Jim Taylor
- 2000: Traffic – Stephen Gaghan *
- 2001: A Beautiful Mind – Akiva Goldsman *
- 2002: The Hours – David Hare
- 2003: American Splendor – Shari Springer Berman and Robert Pulcini
- 2004: Sideways – Alexander Payne and Jim Taylor *
- 2005: Brokeback Mountain – Larry McMurty and Diana Ossana *
- 2006: The Departed – William Monahan *
- 2007: No Country for Old Men – Joel Coen and Ethan Coen *
- 2008: Slumdog Millionaire – Simon Beaufoy *
- 2009: Up in the Air – Jason Reitman
- 2010: The Social Network – Aaron Sorkin *
- 2011: The Descendants – Alexander Payne, Nat Faxon, and Jim Rash *
- 2012: Argo – Chris Terrio *
- 2013: Captain Phillips – Billy Ray
- 2014: The Imitation Game – Graham Moore *
- 2015: The Big Short – Adam McKay and Charles Randolph *
- 2016: Arrival – Eric Heisserer
- 2017: Call Me by Your Name — James Ivory *
- 2018: Can You Ever Forgive Me? – Nicole Holofcener and Jeff Whitty
- 2019: Jojo Rabbit – Taika Waititi *
- 2020: Borat Subsequent Moviefilm – Screenplay by Sacha Baron Cohen, Anthony Hines, Dan Swimer, Peter Baynham, Erica Rivinoja, Dan Mazer, Jena Friedman, and Lee Kern; story by Baron Cohen, Hines, Swimer, and Nina Pedrad
- 2021: CODA – Sian Heder *
- 2022: Women Talking – Sarah Polley *
- 2023: American Fiction – Cord Jefferson *
- 2024: Nickel Boys – RaMell Ross and Joslyn Barnes
- 2025: One Battle After Another — Paul Thomas Anderson *

Best Documentary Screenplay

- 2004: Super Size Me – Morgan Spurlock
- 2005: Enron: The Smartest Guys in the Room – Alex Gibney
- 2006: Deliver Us from Evil – Amy J. Berg
- 2007: Taxi to the Dark Side – Alex Gibney
- 2008: Waltz with Bashir – Ari Folman
- 2009: The Cove – Mark Monroe
- 2010: Inside Job – Charles Ferguson; co-written by Chad Beck and Adam Bolt
- 2011: Better This World – Katie Galloway and Kelly Duane de la Vega
- 2012: Searching for Sugar Man – Malik Bendjelloul
- 2013: Stories We Tell – Sarah Polley
- 2014: The Internet's Own Boy: The Story of Aaron Swartz – Brian Knappenberger
- 2015: Going Clear: Scientology and the Prison of Belief – Alex Gibney
- 2016: Command and Control – Robert Kenner, Brian Pearle, Kim Roberts, and Eric Schlosser
- 2017: Jane – Brett Morgen
- 2018: Bathtubs Over Broadway – Ozzy Inguanzo and Dava Whisenant
- 2019: The Inventor: Out for Blood in Silicon Valley – Alex Gibney
- 2020: The Dissident — Mark Monroe and Bryan Fogel
- 2021: Exposing Muybridge – Marc Shaffer
- 2022: Moonage Daydream – Brett Morgen
- 2023: The Pigeon Tunnel – Errol Morris
- 2024: Jim Henson Idea Man – Mark Monroe
- 2025: 2000 Meters to Andriivka — Mstyslav Chernov

==== Discontinued categories ====
Best Written Drama

- 1949: The Snake Pit – Frank Partos and Millen Brand
- 1950: All the King's Men – Robert Rossen
- 1951: Sunset Boulevard – Charles Brackett, Billy Wilder, and D. M. Marshman Jr. *
- 1952: A Place in the Sun – Michael Wilson and Harry Brown *
- 1953: High Noon – Carl Foreman
- 1954: From Here to Eternity – Daniel Taradash *
- 1955: On the Waterfront – Budd Schulberg *
- 1956: Marty – Paddy Chayefsky *
- 1957: Friendly Persuasion – Michael Wilson
- 1958: 12 Angry Men – Reginald Rose
- 1959: The Defiant Ones – Nedrick Young and Harold Jacob Smith *
- 1960: The Diary of Anne Frank – Frances Goodrich and Albert Hackett
- 1961: Elmer Gantry – Richard Brooks *
- 1962: The Hustler – Sidney Carroll and Robert Rossen
- 1963: To Kill a Mockingbird – Horton Foote *
- 1964: Hud – Harriet Frank Jr. and Irving Ravetch
- 1965: Becket – Edward Anhalt *
- 1966: The Pawnbroker – Edward Lewis Wallant, Morton Fine, and David Friedkin
- 1967: Who's Afraid of Virginia Woolf? – Ernest Lehman
- 1968: Bonnie and Clyde – David Newman and Robert Benton
- 1969: The Lion in Winter – James Goldman *

Best Original Drama

- 1970: Butch Cassidy and the Sundance Kid – William Goldman *
- 1971: Patton – Francis Ford Coppola and Edmund H. North *
- 1972: Sunday Bloody Sunday – Penelope Gilliatt
- 1973: The Candidate – Jeremy Larner *
- 1974: Save the Tiger – Steve Shagan
- 1975: Chinatown – Robert Towne *
- 1976: Dog Day Afternoon – Frank Pierson *
- 1977: Network – Paddy Chayefsky *
- 1978: The Turning Point – Arthur Laurents
- 1979: Coming Home – Nancy Dowd, Robert C. Jones, and Waldo Salt *
- 1980: The China Syndrome – Mike Gray, T. S. Cook and James Bridges
- 1981: Melvin and Howard – Bo Goldman *
- 1982: Reds – Warren Beatty and Trevor Griffiths
- 1983: E.T. the Extra-Terrestrial – Melissa Mathison
- 1984: Tender Mercies – Horton Foote *

Best Adapted Drama

- 1970: Midnight Cowboy – Waldo Salt *
- 1971: I Never Sang for My Father – Robert Anderson
- 1972: The French Connection – Ernest Tidyman *
- 1973: The Godfather – Mario Puzo and Francis Ford Coppola *
- 1974: Serpico – Waldo Salt and Norman Wexler
- 1975: The Godfather Part II – Francis Ford Coppola and Mario Puzo *
- 1976: One Flew Over the Cuckoo's Nest – Bo Goldman and Lawrence Hauben *
- 1977: All the President's Men – William Goldman *
- 1978: Islands in the Stream – Denne Bart Petitclerc
- 1979: Midnight Express – Oliver Stone *
- 1980: Kramer vs. Kramer – Robert Benton *
- 1981: Ordinary People – Alvin Sargent *
- 1982: On Golden Pond – Ernest Thompson *
- 1983: Missing – Costa-Gavras and Donald E. Stewart *
- 1984: Reuben, Reuben – Julius J. Epstein

Best Written Comedy

- 1949: Sitting Pretty – F. Hugh Herbert
- 1950: A Letter to Three Wives – Joseph L. Mankiewicz *
- 1951: All About Eve – Joseph L. Mankiewicz *
- 1952: Father's Little Dividend – Albert Hackett and Frances Goodrich
- 1953: The Quiet Man – Frank Nugent
- 1954: Roman Holiday – Ian McLellan Hunter, Dalton Trumbo, and John Dighton *
- 1955: Sabrina – Billy Wilder, Samuel Taylor, and Ernest Lehman
- 1956: Mister Roberts – Joshua Logan and Frank Nugent
- 1957: Around the World in 80 Days – James Poe, John Farrow, and S. J. Perelman *
- 1958: Love in the Afternoon – Billy Wilder and I. A. L. Diamond
- 1959: Me and the Colonel – S. N. Behrman and George Froeschel
- 1960: Some Like It Hot – Billy Wilder and I. A. L. Diamond
- 1961: The Apartment – Billy Wilder and I. A. L. Diamond *
- 1962: Breakfast at Tiffany's – George Axelrod
- 1963: That Touch of Mink – Stanley Shapiro and Nate Monastar
- 1964: Lilies of the Field – James Poe
- 1965: Dr. Strangelove – Stanley Kubrick, Terry Southern, and Peter George
- 1966: A Thousand Clowns – Herb Gardner
- 1967: The Russians Are Coming, the Russians Are Coming – William Rose
- 1968: The Graduate – Calder Willingham and Buck Henry
- 1969: The Odd Couple – Neil Simon

Best Original Comedy

- 1970: Bob & Carol & Ted & Alice – Paul Mazursky and Larry Tucker
- 1971: The Out-of-Towners – Neil Simon
- 1972: The Hospital – Paddy Chayefsky *
- 1973: What's Up, Doc? – Peter Bogdanovich, Buck Henry, David Newman, and Robert Benton
- 1974: A Touch of Class – Melvin Frank and Jack Rose
- 1975: Blazing Saddles – Mel Brooks, Norman Steinberg, Andrew Bergman, Richard Pryor, and Alan Uger
- 1976: Shampoo – Robert Towne and Warren Beatty
- 1977: The Bad News Bears – Bill Lancaster
- 1978: Annie Hall – Woody Allen and Marshall Brickman *
- 1979: Movie Movie – Larry Gelbart and Sheldon Keller
- 1980: Breaking Away – Steve Tesich *
- 1981: Private Benjamin – Nancy Meyers, Harvey Miller, and Charles Shyer
- 1982: Arthur – Steve Gordon
- 1983: Tootsie – Don McGuire, Larry Gelbart and Murray Schisgal
- 1984: The Big Chill – Lawrence Kasdan and Barbara Benedek

Best Adapted Comedy

- 1970: Goodbye, Columbus – Arnold Schulman
- 1971: MASH – Ring Lardner Jr. *
- 1972: Kotch – John Paxton
- 1973: Cabaret – Jay Presson Allen
- 1974: Paper Moon – Alvin Sargent
- 1975: The Apprenticeship of Duddy Kravitz – Lionel Chetwynd and Mordecai Richler
- 1976: The Sunshine Boys – Neil Simon
- 1977: The Pink Panther Strikes Again – Blake Edwards and Frank Waldman
- 1978: Oh, God! – Larry Gelbart
- 1979: Heaven Can Wait – Elaine May and Warren Beatty and Same Time, Next Year – Bernard Slade
- 1980: Being There – Jerzy Kosiński
- 1981: Airplane! – Jim Abrahams, David Zucker and Jerry Zucker
- 1982: Rich and Famous – Gerard Ayres
- 1983: Victor/Victoria – Blake Edwards
- 1984: Terms of Endearment – James L. Brooks *

Best Written Musical

- 1949: Easter Parade – Frances Goodrich, Albert Hackett, and Sidney Sheldon
- 1950: On the Town – Adolph Green and Betty Comden
- 1951: Annie Get Your Gun – Sidney Sheldon
- 1952: An American in Paris – Alan Jay Lerner *
- 1953: Singin' in the Rain – Betty Comden and Adolph Green
- 1954: Lili – Helen Deutsch and Paul Gallico
- 1955: Seven Brides for Seven Brothers – Albert Hackett, Frances Goodrich, and Dorothy Kingsley
- 1956: Love Me or Leave Me – Daniel Fuchs and Isobel Lennart *
- 1957: The King and I – Ernest Lehman
- 1958: Les Girls – Vera Caspary and John Patrick
- 1959: Gigi – Alan Jay Lerner *
- 1960: The Five Pennies – Robert Smith, Jack Rose, and Melville Shavelson
- 1961: Bells Are Ringing – Betty Comden and Adolph Green
- 1962: West Side Story – Ernest Lehman
- 1963: The Music Man – Meredith Willson, Franklin Lacey, and Marion Hargrove
- 1964: Not awarded
- 1965: Mary Poppins – Bill Walsh and Don DaGradi
- 1966: The Sound of Music – Maria Augusta Trapp, Howard Lindsay, Russel Crouse, and Ernest Lehman
- 1967: Not awarded
- 1968: Thoroughly Modern Millie – Richard Morris
- 1969: Funny Girl – Isobel Lennart

Best Written Film Concerning Problems with the American Scene

- 1949: The Snake Pit – Frank Partos and Millen Brand
- 1950: All the King's Men – Robert Rossen
- 1951: The Men – Carl Foreman
- 1952: Bright Victory – Robert Buckner

Best Written Western

- 1949: The Treasure of the Sierra Madre – John Huston *
- 1950: Yellow Sky – W. R. Burnett and Lamar Trotti
- 1951: Broken Arrow – Albert Maltz

=== Television ===
==== Dramatic Series ====
- 2005: Lost – J. J. Abrams, Kim Clements, Carlton Cuse, Leonard Dick, Paul Dini, Brent Fletcher, David Fury, Drew Goddard, Javier Grillo-Marxuach, Adam Horowitz, Jennifer M. Johnson, Christina M. Kim, Edward Kitsis, Jeffrey Lieber, Damon Lindelof, Lynne E. Litt, Monica Macer, Steven Maeda, Elizabeth Sarnoff, Janet Tamaro, Christian Taylor, and Craig Wright
- 2006: The Sopranos – Mitchell Burgess, David Chase, Diane Frolov, Robin Green, Andrew Schneider, Matthew Weiner, and Terence Winter
- 2007: The Wire – Ed Burns, Chris Collins, Dennis Lehane, David Mills, George Pelecanos, Richard Price, David Simon, and William F. Zorzi
- 2008: Mad Men – Lisa Albert, Jane Anderson, Rick Cleveland, Kater Gordon, David Isaacs, Andre Jacquemetton, Maria Jacquemetton, Marti Noxon, Robin Veith, and Matthew Weiner
- 2009: Mad Men – Lisa Albert, Andrew Colville, Kater Gordon, Cathryn Humphris, Andre Jacquemetton, Maria Jacquemetton, Brett Johnson, Erin Levy, Marti Noxon, Frank Pierson, Robin Veith, Dahvi Waller, and Matthew Weiner
- 2010: Mad Men – Jonathan Abrahams, Lisa Albert, Keith Huff, Jonathan Igla, Andre Jacquemetton, Maria Jacquemetton, Brett Johnson, Janet Leahy, Erin Levy, Tracy McMillan, Dahvi Waller, and Matthew Weiner
- 2011, 2012 and 2013: Breaking Bad – Sam Catlin, Vince Gilligan, Peter Gould, Gennifer Hutchison, George Mastras, Thomas Schnauz, and Moira Walley-Beckett
- 2014: True Detective – Nic Pizzolatto
- 2015: Mad Men – Lisa Albert, Semi Chellas, Jonathan Igla, Janet Leahy, Erin Levy, Tom Smuts, Robert Towne, Matthew Weiner, and Carly Wray
- 2016: The Americans – Peter Ackerman, Tanya Barfield, Joshua Brand, Joel Fields, Stephen Schiff, Joe Weisberg, and Tracey Scott Wilson
- 2017: The Handmaid's Tale – Ilene Chaiken, Nina Fiore, Dorothy Fortenberry, Leila Gerstein, John Herrera, Lynn Maxcy, Bruce Miller, Kira Snyder, Wendy Straker Hauser, and Eric Tuchman
- 2018: The Americans – Peter Ackerman, Hilary Bettis, Joshua Brand, Joel Fields, Sarah Nolen, Stephen Schiff, Justin Weinberger, Joe Weisberg, and Tracey Scott Wilson
- 2019: Succession – Jesse Armstrong, Alice Birch, Jon Brown, Jonathan Glatzer, Cord Jefferson, Mary Laws, Lucy Prebble, Georgia Pritchett, Tony Roche, Gary Shteyngart, Susan Soon He Stanton, and Will Tracy
- 2020: The Crown – Peter Morgan and Jonathan Wilson
- 2021: Succession – Jesse Armstrong, Jon Brown, Jamie Carragher, Ted Cohen, Francesca Gardiner, Lucy Prebble, Georgia Pritchett, Tony Roche, Gary Shteyngart, Susan Soon He Stanton, and Will Tracy
- 2022: Severance – Chris Black, Andrew Colville, Kari Drake, Dan Erickson, Mark Friedman, Helen Leigh, Anna Moench, and Amanda Overton
- 2023: Succession – Will Arbery, Jesse Armstrong, Miriam Battye, Jon Brown, Jamie Carragher, Ted Cohen, Nate Elston, Francesca Gardiner, Callie Hersheway, Lucy Prebble, Georgia Pritchett, Tony Roche, Susan Soon He Stanton, and Will Tracy
- 2024: Shōgun – Shannon Goss, Maegan Houang, Rachel Kondo, Matt Lambert, Justin Marks, Caillin Puente, Nigel Williams, and Emily Yoshida
- 2025: The Pitt – Cynthia Adarkwa, Simran Baidwan, Valerie Chu, R. Scott Gemmill, Elyssa Gershman, Joe Sachs, and Noah Wyle

==== Comedy Series ====
- 2005: Curb Your Enthusiasm – Larry David
- 2006: The Office – Steve Carell, Jennifer Celotta, Greg Daniels, Lee Eisenberg, Brent Forrester, Ricky Gervais, Mindy Kaling, Paul Lieberstein, Stephen Merchant, B. J. Novak, Michael Schur, Justin Spitzer, and Gene Stupnitsky
- 2007: 30 Rock – Brett Baer, Jack Burditt, Kay Cannon, Robert Carlock, Tina Fey, Dave Finkel, Daisy Gardner, Donald Glover, Matt Hubbard, Jon Pollack, John Riggi, Tami Sagher, and Ron Weiner
- 2008: 30 Rock – Jack Burditt, Kay Cannon, Robert Carlock, Tina Fey, Donald Glover, Andrew Guest, Matt Hubbard, Jon Pollack, John Riggi, Tami Sagher, and Ron Weiner
- 2009: 30 Rock – Jack Burditt, Kay Cannon, Robert Carlock, Tom Ceraulo, Vali Chandrasekaran, Tina Fey, Donald Glover, Steve Hely, Matt Hubbard, Dylan Morgan, Paula Pell, Jon Pollack, John Riggi, Tami Sagher, Josh Siegal, Ron Weiner, and Tracey Wigfield
- 2010: Modern Family – Jerry Collins, Paul Corrigan, Alex Herschlag, Abraham Higginbotham, Elaine Ko, Joe Lawson, Steve Levitan, Christopher Lloyd, Dan O'Shannon, Jeffrey Richman, Brad Walsh, Ilana Wernick, Bill Wrubel, and Danny Zuker
- 2011: Modern Family – Cindy Chupack, Paul Corrigan, Abraham Higginbotham, Ben Karlin, Elaine Ko, Carol Leifer, Steve Levitan, Christopher Lloyd, Dan O'Shannon, Jeffrey Richman, Brad Walsh, Ilana Wernick, Bill Wrubel, and Danny Zuker
- 2012: Louie – Pamela Adlon, Vernon Chatman, and Louis C.K.
- 2013: Veep – Simon Blackwell, Roger Drew, Sean Gray, Armando Iannucci, Ian Martin, Georgia Pritchett, David Quantick, Tony Roche, and Will Smith
- 2014: Louie – Pamela Adlon and Louis C.K.
- 2015: Veep – Simon Blackwell, Jon Brown, Kevin Cecil, Roger Drew, Peter Fellows, Neil and Rob Gibbons, Sean Gray, Callie Hersheway, Armando Iannucci, Sean Love, Ian Martin, Georgia Pritchett, David Quantick, Andy Riley, Tony Roche, and Will Smith
- 2016: Atlanta – Donald Glover, Stephen Glover, Stefani Robinson, and Paul Simms
- 2017: Veep – Rachel Axler, Sean Gray, Alex Gregory, Peter Huyck, Eric Kenward, Billy Kimball, Steve Koren, David Mandel, Jim Margolis, Lew Morton, Georgia Pritchett, Will Smith, and Alexis Wilkinson
- 2018: The Marvelous Mrs. Maisel – Kate Fodor, Noah Gardenswartz, Jen Kirkman, Sheila Lawrence, Daniel Palladino, and Amy Sherman-Palladino
- 2019: Barry – Alec Berg, Duffy Boudreau, Bill Hader, Emily Heller, Jason Kim, Taofik Kolade, and Elizabeth Sarnoff
- 2020: Ted Lasso – Jane Becker, Leann Bowen, Brett Goldstein, Brendan Hunt, Joe Kell, Bill Lawrence, Jamie Lee, Jason Sudeikis, Phoebe Walsh, and Bill Wrubel
- 2021: Hacks – Lucia Aniello, Joanna Calo, Jessica Chaffin, Paul W. Downs, Cole Escola, Janis Hirsch, Ariel Karlin, Katherine Kearns, Andrew Law, Joe Mande, Pat Regan, Samantha Riley, Michael Schur, and Jen Statsky
- 2022: The Bear – Karen Joseph Adcock, Joanna Calo, Rene Gube, Sofya Levitsky-Weitz, Alex O'Keefe, Catherine Schetina, and Christopher Storer
- 2023: The Bear – Karen Joseph Adcock, Joanna Calo, Kelly Galuska, Rene Gube, Sofya Levitsky-Weitz, Stacy Osei-Kuffour, Alex Russell, Catherine Schetina, and Christopher Storer
- 2024: Hacks – Lucia Aniello, Guy Branum, Jessica Chaffin, Paul W. Downs, Jess Dweck, Ariel Karlin, Andrew Law, Carol Leifer, Carolyn Lipka, Joe Mande, Aisha Muharrar, Pat Regan, Samantha Riley, and Jen Statsky
- 2025: The Studio – Evan Goldberg, Alex Gregory, Peter Huyck, Frida Perez, and Seth Rogen

==== New Series ====
- 2005: Grey's Anatomy – Zoanne A. Clack, Ann Hamilton, Kip Koenig, Stacy McKee, James D. Parriott, Tony Phelan, Joan Rater, Shonda Rhimes, Mimi Schmir, Gabrielle Stanton, Krista Vernoff, and Harry Werksman
- 2006: Ugly Betty – Veronica Becker, Oliver Goldstick, Silvio Horta, Sarah Kucserka, Sheila R. Lawrence, Cameron Litvack, Myra Jo Martino, Jim Parriott, Marco Pennette, Dailyn Rodriguez, and Donald Todd
- 2007: Mad Men – Lisa Albert, Bridget Bedard, Andre Jacquemetton, Maria Jacquemetton, Tom Palmer, Chris Provenzano, Robin Veith, and Matthew Weiner
- 2008: In Treatment – Rodrigo García, Bryan Goluboff, Davey Holmes, William Merritt Johnson, Amy Lippman, and Sarah Treem
- 2009: Modern Family – Paul Corrigan, Sameer Gardezi, Joe Lawson, Steven Levitan, Christopher Lloyd, Dan O'Shannon, Brad Walsh, Caroline Williams, Bill Wrubel, and Danny Zuker
- 2010: Boardwalk Empire – Meg Jackson, Lawrence Konner, Howard Korder, Steve Kornacki, Margaret Nagle, Tim Van Patten, Paul Simms, and Terence Winter
- 2011: Homeland – Henry Bromell, Alexander Cary, Alex Gansa, Howard Gordon, Chip Johannessen, Gideon Raff, and Meredith Stiehm
- 2012: Girls – Judd Apatow, Lesley Arfin, Lena Dunham, Sarah Heyward, Bruce Eric Kaplan, Jenni Konner, Deborah Schoeneman, and Dan Sterling
- 2013: House of Cards – Kate Barnow, Rick Cleveland, Sam Forman, Gina Gionfriddo, Keith Huff, Sarah Treem, and Beau Willimon
- 2014: True Detective – Nic Pizzolatto
- 2015: Mr. Robot – Kyle Bradstreet, Kate Erickson, Sam Esmail, David Iserson, Randolph Leon, Adam Penn, and Matt Pyken
- 2016: Atlanta – Donald Glover, Stephen Glover, Stefani Robinson, and Paul Simms
- 2017: The Handmaid's Tale – Ilene Chaiken, Nina Fiore, Dorothy Fortenberry, Leila Gerstein, John Herrera, Lynn Maxcy, Bruce Miller, Kira Snyder, Wendy Straker Hauser, and Eric Tuchman
- 2018: Barry – Alec Berg, Duffy Boudreau, Bill Hader, Emily Heller, Elizabeth Sarnoff, Ben Smith, and Sarah Solemani
- 2019: Watchmen – Lila Byock, Nick Cuse, Christal Henry, Branden Jacobs-Jenkins, Cord Jefferson, Jeff Jensen, Claire Kiechel, Damon Lindelof, Stacy Osei-Kuffour, Tom Spezialy, and Carly Wray
- 2020: Ted Lasso – Jane Becker, Leann Bowen, Brett Goldstein, Brendan Hunt, Joe Kell, Bill Lawrence, Jamie Lee, Jason Sudeikis, Phoebe Walsh, and Bill Wrubel
- 2021: Hacks – Lucia Aniello, Joanna Calo, Jessica Chaffin, Paul W. Downs, Cole Escola, Janis Hirsch, Ariel Karlin, Katherine Kearns, Andrew Law, Joe Mande, Pat Regan, Samantha Riley, Michael Schur, and Jen Statsky
- 2022: Severance - Chris Black, Andrew Colville, Kari Drake, Dan Erickson, Mark Friedman, Helen Leigh, Anna Moench, and Amanda Overton
- 2023: The Last of Us – Neil Druckmann, Halley Gross, Craig Mazin, and Bo Shim
- 2024: Shōgun – Shannon Goss, Maegan Houang, Rachel Kondo, Matt Lambert, Justin Marks, Caillin Puente, Nigel Williams, and Emily Yoshida
- 2025: The Pitt – Cynthia Adarkwa, Simran Baidwan, Valerie Chu, R. Scott Gemmill, Elyssa Gershman, Joe Sachs, and Noah Wyle

==== Episodic Drama ====
- 1960: The Untouchables ("The Unhired Assassin") – William Spier
- 1961: Naked City ("The Fault in Our Stars") – Barry Trivers
- 1962: Naked City ("Today the Man Who Kills the Ants is Coming") – Story by Kenneth M. Rosen; Teleplay by Howard Rodman and Kenneth M. Rosen
- 1963: Route 66 ("Man Out of Time") – Lawrence B. Marcus
- 1964: East Side/West Side ("Who Do You Kill?") – Arnold Perl
- 1965: Mr. Novak ("With a Hammer in His Hand, Lord, Lord!") – John D. F. Black
- 1966: The Trials of O'Brien ("No Justice for the Judge") – David Ellis
- 1967: Star Trek ("The City on the Edge of Forever") – Harlan Ellison
- 1968: Judd, for the Defense ("To Kill a Madman") – Robert Lewin
- 1969: Judd, for the Defense ("An Elephant in a Cigar Box") – Robert Lewin
- 1970: The Bold Ones: The Senator ("A Continual Roar of Musketry") – David W. Rintels
- 1971: The Psychiatrist ("Par for the Course") – Story by Thomas Y. Drake; Teleplay by Herb Bermann, Thomas Y. Drake, Jerrold Freedman, and Bo May
- 1972: Kung Fu ("King of the Mountain") – Herman Miller
- 1973: The Starlost ("Phoenix Without Ashes") – Harlan Ellison
- 1974: Gunsmoke ("Thirty a Month and Found") – Jim Byrnes
- 1975: The Law ("Prior Consent") – Story by Stephen Kandel; Teleplay by Arthur A. Ross
- 1976: Sandburg's Lincoln ("Crossing Fox River") – Loring Mandel
- 1977: Police Story ("Pressure Point") – Mark Rodgers
- 1978: Lou Grant ("Prisoner") – Seth Freeman
- 1979: Lou Grant ("Vet") – Leon Tokatyan
- 1980: Tenspeed and Brown Shoe ("Pilot") – Stephen J. Cannell
- 1981: Hill Street Blues ("Hill Street Station") – Michael Kozoll and Steven Bochco
- 1982: Hill Street Blues ("The World According to Freedom") – Michael Wagner
- 1983: Hill Street Blues ("Trial by Fury") – David Milch
- 1984: Hill Street Blues ("Grace Under Pressure") – Story by Steven Bochco, Jeffrey Lewis, and David Milch; Teleplay by Jeffrey Lewis, Michael Wagner, Karen Hall, and Mark Frost
- 1985: Cagney & Lacey ("An Unusual Occurrence") – Georgia Jeffries
  Miami Vice ("Brother's Keeper") – Anthony Yerkovich
- 1986: Moonlighting ("The Dream Sequence Always Rings Twice") – Debra Frank and Carl Sautter
  St. Elsewhere ("Remembrance of Things Past") – John Masius, Bruce Paltrow, and Tom Fontana
- 1987: Cagney & Lacey ("Turn, Turn, Turn: Part 1") – Georgia Jeffries
  Moonlighting ("It's a Wonderful Job") – Debra Frank and Carl Sautter
- 1988: thirtysomething – Marshall Herskovitz and Edward Zwick ("Pilot") and Susan Shilliday ("Therapy")
- 1989: TV 101 ("Rolling") – Karl Schaefer
- 1990: China Beach ("Souvenirs") – John Sacret Young
- 1991: thirtysomething ("Photo Opportunity") – Racelle Rosett Schaefer
- 1992: I'll Fly Away ("Amazing Grace") – Henry Bromell
- 1993: Homicide: Life on the Street ("Night of the Dead Living") – Story by Tom Fontana and Frank Pugliese; Teleplay by Frank Pugliese
- 1994: Homicide: Life on the Street ("Bop Gun") – Story by Tom Fontana; Teleplay by David Simon and David Mills
- 1995: ER ("Love's Labor Lost") – Lance A. Gentile
- 1996: NYPD Blue ("Girl Talk") – Story by Bill Clark and Theresa Rebeck; Teleplay by Theresa Rebeck
- 1997: Law & Order ("Entrapment") – Rene Balcer and Richard Sweren
- 1998: Nothing Sacred ("Proofs for the Existence of God") – Paul Leland
- 1999: The Sopranos ("Meadowlands") – Jason Cahill
- 2000: The West Wing ("In Excelsis Deo") – Aaron Sorkin and Rick Cleveland
- 2001: The Sopranos ("Pine Barrens") – Story by Tim Van Patten and Terence Winter; Teleplay by Terence Winter
- 2002: The Education of Max Bickford ("Pilot") – Dawn Prestwich and Nicole Yorkin
- 2003: 24 ("Day 2: 7:00 p.m. – 8:00 p.m.") – Evan Katz
- 2004: The West Wing ("The Supremes") – Debora Cahn
- 2005: House ("Autopsy") – Lawrence Kaplow
- 2006: Big Love ("Pilot") – Mark V. Olsen and Will Scheffer
- 2007: The Sopranos ("The Second Coming") – Terence Winter
- 2008 and 2011: Breaking Bad ("Pilot" and "Box Cutter") – Vince Gilligan
- 2009: House ("Broken") – Russel Friend, Garrett Lerner, David Foster, and David Shore
- 2010: Mad Men ("The Chrysanthemum and the Sword") – Erin Levy
- 2011: Homeland ("The Good Soldier") – Henry Bromell
- 2012: Mad Men ("The Other Woman") – Semi Chellas and Matthew Weiner
- 2013: Breaking Bad ("Confessions") – Gennifer Hutchison
- 2014: The Good Wife ("The Last Call") – Robert and Michelle King
- 2015: Better Call Saul ("Uno") – Vince Gilligan and Peter Gould
- 2016: This Is Us ("The Trip") – Vera Herbert
- 2017: Better Call Saul ("Chicanery") – Gordon Smith
- 2018: Homeland ("Paean to the People") – Alex Gansa
- 2019: Succession ("Tern Haven") – Will Tracy
- 2020: Ozark ("Fire Pink") – Miki Johnson
- 2021: Succession ("Retired Janitors of Idaho") – Tony Roche and Susan Soon He Stanton
- 2022: Better Call Saul ("Plan and Execution") – Thomas Schnauz
- 2023: Succession ("Living+") – Georgia Pritchett and Will Arbery
- 2024: Shōgun ("Anjin") – Rachel Kondo and Justin Marks
- 2025: The Pitt ("7:00 A.M.") – R. Scott Gemmill

==== Episodic Comedy ====
- 1960: Father Knows Best ("Margaret's Old Flame") – Dorothy Cooper
- 1961: The Andy Griffith Show ("The Manhunt") – Charles Stewart and Jack Elinson
- 1962: Car 54, Where Are You? ("I Won't Go") – Nat Hiken and Gary Belkin
- 1963: The Andy Griffith Show ("Barney's First Car") – Jim Fritzell and Everett Greenbaum
- 1964: The Andy Griffith Show ("The Shoplifters") – Bill Idelson and Sam Bobrick
  The Dick Van Dyke Show ("My Husband is the Best One") – Martin Ragaway
- 1965: The Dick Van Dyke Show ("Br-room, Br-room") – Dale McRaven and Carl Kleinschmitt
- 1966: The Dick Van Dyke Show ("You Ought to Be in Pictures") – Jack Winter
- 1967: The Jackie Gleason Show ("Movies Are Better than Ever") – Marvin Marx, Walter Stone, and Rod Parker
- 1968: Get Smart ("Viva Smart") – Bill Idelson, Sam Bobrick, and Norman Paul
- 1969: Room 222 ("Funny Boy") – Allan Burns
- 1970: Room 222 ("The Valedictorian") – Richard DeRoy
- 1971: The Mary Tyler Moore Show ("Thorough Unmilitant Mary") – Martin Cohan
- 1972: M*A*S*H ("Chief Surgeon Who?") – Larry Gelbart
- 1973: Maude ("Walter's Problem") – Bob Weiskopf and Bob Schiller
- 1974: M*A*S*H ("O.R.") – Larry Gelbart and Laurence Marks
- 1975: M*A*S*H ("Welcome to Korea") – Everett Greenbaum, Jim Fritzell, and Larry Gelbart
- 1976: M*A*S*H ("Dear Sigmund") – Alan Alda
- 1977: All in the Family ("Archie Get the Business") – Larry Rhine and Mel Tolkin
- 1978: M*A*S*H ("Baby, It's Cold Outside") – Gary David Goldberg
- 1979: M*A*S*H ("Are You Now, Margaret?") – Thad Mumford and Dan Wilcox
  Taxi ("The Reluctant Father") – Ken Estin
- 1980: M*A*S*H ("Heal Thyself") – Story by Dennis Koenig and Gene Reynolds; Teleplay by Dennis Koenig
- 1981: Barney Miller ("Stormy Weather") – Nat Mauldin
- 1982: Barney Miller ("Hunger Strike") – Story by Tony Sheehan and Stephen Neigher; Teleplay by Tony Sheehan
- 1983 and 1991: Cheers ("The Boys in the Bar" and "Rat Girl") – Ken Levine and David Isaacs
- 1983: Cheers ("Give Me a Ring Sometime") – Glen and Les Charles
- 1984: Cheers ("Sumner's Return") – Michael J. Weithorn
- 1985: Moonlighting ("Pilot") – Glenn Gordon Caron
  Steambath ("Madison Avenue Madness") – David Pollock and Elias Davis
- 1986: Kate & Allie ("Allie's Affair") – Bob Randall
- 1987: The Days and Nights of Molly Dodd ("Here's Why Cosmetics Should Come in Unbreakable Bottles") – Jay Tarses
  Family Ties ("A, My Name is Alex") – Gary David Goldberg and Alan Uger
  The Golden Girls ("'Twas the Nightmare Before Christmas") – Barry Fanaro and Mort Nathan
- 1988: The Wonder Years ("My Father's Office") – Carol Black and Neal Marlens
- 1989: The Wonder Years ("Coda") – Todd W. Langen
- 1990: Murphy Brown ("Brown Like Me") – Diane English
- 1992: Murphy Brown ("Uh-Oh, Part 2") – Story by Korby Siamis and Diane English; Teleplay by Diane English
- 1993: Seinfeld ("The Contest") – Larry David
- 1994: Seinfeld ("The Mango") – Story by Lawrence H. Levy; Teleplay by Lawrence H. Levy and Larry David
- 1995: Frasier ("The Matchmaker") – Joe Keenan
- 1996: Seinfeld ("The Pool Guy") – David Mandel
- 1997: Seinfeld ("The Fatigues") – Greg Kavet and Andy Robin
- 1998: Frasier ("Frasier's Imaginary Friend") – Rob Greenberg
- 1999: Frasier ("Merry Christmas, Mrs. Moskowitz") – Jay Kogen
- 2000: Frasier ("Something Borrowed, Someone Blue") – Christopher Lloyd and Joe Keenan
- 2001: Everybody Loves Raymond ("Italy") – Philip Rosenthal
- 2002: Frasier ("Rooms with a View") – Dan O'Shannon, Lori Kirkland, and Bob Daily
- 2003: Frasier ("No Sex, Please, We're Skittish") – Bob Daily
- 2004: Arrested Development ("Pier Pressure") – Jim Vallely and Mitchell Hurwitz
  Malcolm in the Middle ("Ida's Boyfriend") – Neil Thompson
- 2005: Weeds ("You Can't Miss the Bear") – Jenji Kohan
- 2006: The Office ("Casino Night") – Steve Carell
- 2007: The Office ("The Job") – Paul Lieberstein and Michael Schur
- 2008: 30 Rock ("Succession") – Andrew Guest and John Riggi
- 2009 and 2010: 30 Rock ("Apollo, Apollo" and "When It Rains, It Pours") – Robert Carlock
- 2009: Modern Family ("Pilot") – Steven Levitan and Christopher Lloyd
- 2011: Modern Family ("Caught in the Act") – Steven Levitan and Jeffrey Richman
- 2012: Modern Family ("Virgin Territory") – Elaine Ko
- 2013: 30 Rock ("Hogcock!") – Jack Burditt and Robert Carlock
- 2014: Louie ("So Did the Fat Lady") – Louis C.K.
- 2015: Silicon Valley ("Sand Hill Shuffle") – Clay Tarver
- 2016: Unbreakable Kimmy Schmidt ("Kimmy Goes on a Playdate!") – Robert Carlock
- 2017: Will & Grace ("Rosario's Quinceanera") – Tracy Poust and Jon Kinnally
- 2018: Barry ("Chapter One: Make Your Mark") – Alec Berg and Bill Hader
- 2019: Dead to Me ("Pilot") – Liz Feldman
- 2020 and 2021: The Great ("The Great" and "Alone at Last") – Tony McNamara
- 2022 and 2024: Hacks ("The One, The Only" and "Bulletproof") – Lucia Aniello, Paul W. Downs, and Jen Statsky
- 2023: Poker Face ("Escape from Shit Mountain") – Nora and Lilla Zuckerman
- 2025: The Righteous Gemstones ("Prelude") – John Carcieri, Jeff Fradley, and Danny McBride

==== TV & New Media Motion Pictures ====
- 2022: Honor Society – David A. Goodman
- 2023: Quiz Lady – Jen D'Angelo
- 2024: The Great Lillian Hall – Elisabeth Seldes-Annacone
- 2025: Deep Cover – Derek Connolly and Colin Trevorrow

==== Limited Series ====
- 2022: The White Lotus – Mike White
- 2023: Beef – Joanna Calo, Bathsheba Doran, Jean Kyoung Frazier, Niko Gutierrez-Kovner, Lee Sung Jin, Alice Ju, Carrie Kemper, Mike Makowsky, Marie Hanhnhon Nguyen, Kevin Rosen, and Alex Russell
- 2024: The Penguin – Vladimir Cvetko, Breannah Gibson, Erika L. Johnson, Lauren LeFranc, Corina Maritescu, Megan Martin, John McCutcheon, Shaye Ogbonna, Kira Snyder, Nick Towne, and Noelle Valdivia
- 2025: Dying for Sex – Sheila Callaghan, Harris Danow, Madeleine George, Elizabeth Meriwether, Kim Rosenstock, Sasha Stewart, Sabrina Wu, and Keisha Zollar

==== Animation ====
- 2002 and 2010: Futurama ("Godfellas" and "Prisoner of Benda") – Ken Keeler
- 2003: The Simpsons ("The Dad Who Knew Too Little") – Matt Selman
- 2004: The Simpsons ("Catch 'em If You Can") – Ian Maxtone-Graham
- 2005: The Simpsons ("Mommie Beerest") – Michael Price
- 2006: The Simpsons ("The Italian Bob") – John Frink
- 2007, 2008 and 2012: The Simpsons ("Kill Gil, Volumes I & II", "Apocalypse Cow" and "Ned 'n' Edna's Blend Agenda") – Jeff Westbrook
- 2009, 2011 and 2013: The Simpsons ("Wedding for Disaster", "Homer the Father" and "A Test Before Trying") – Joel H. Cohen
- 2014: The Simpsons ("Brick Like Me") – Brian Kelley
- 2015: Bob's Burgers ("Housetrap") – Dan Fybel
- 2016: BoJack Horseman ("Stop the Presses") – Joe Lawson
- 2017: BoJack Horseman ("Time's Arrow") – Kate Purdy
- 2018: The Simpsons ("Bart's Not Dead") – Stephanie Gillis
- 2019: The Simpsons ("Thanksgiving of Horror") – Dan Vebber
- 2020: BoJack Horseman ("Xerox of a Xerox") – Nick Adams
- 2021: Tuca & Bertie ("Planteau") – Lisa Hanawalt
- 2022: Undone ("Rectify") – Elijah Aron and Patrick Metcalf
- 2023: The Simpsons ("Carl Carlson Rides Again") – Loni Steele Sosthand
- 2024: Bob's Burgers ("Saving Favorite Drive-In") – Katie Crown
- 2025: Long Story Short ("Shira Can't Cook") – Mehar Sethi

==== Comedy-Variety Talk Series ====
- 1996: Late Night with Conan O'Brien – Jonathan Groff, Brian Kiley, Janine Ditullio, Tom Agna, Chris Albers, Tommy Blacha, Brian McCann, Michael Gordon, Mike Sweeney, Greg Cohen, Andy Richter, Conan O'Brien, Ned Goldreyer, and Dino Stamatopoulos
- 1997: No award given
- 1998: Dennis Miller Live – Eddie Feldmann, Dennis Miller, David Feldman, Tom Hertz, Mike Gandolfi, Leah Krinsky, and Rick Overton
- 1999: Late Night with Conan O'Brien – Jonathan Groff, Jon Glaser, Conan O'Brien, Andy Richter, Mike Sweeney, Michael Gordon, Brian Kiley, Brian Stack, Chris Albers, Brian McCann, Ellie Barancik, Janine Ditullio, Andy Blitz, Tommy Blacha, Brian Reich, Vernon Chatman, and Roy Jenkins
- 2000: Dennis Miller Live – Supervising Writer: Eddie Feldmann; Writers: Jose Arroyo, David Feldman, Jim Hanna, Leah Krinsky Atkins, Dennis Miller, Jacob Sager Weinstein, and David Weiss
- 2001: Late Night with Conan O'Brien – Mike Sweeney, Chris Albers, Ellie Barancik, Andy Blitz, Kevin Dorff, Jon Glaser, Michael Gordon, Brian Kiley, Michael Koman, Brian McCann, Guy Nicolucci, Conan O'Brien, Andrew Secunda, Robert Smigel, Brian Stack, and Andrew Weinberg
- 2002: Late Night with Conan O'Brien – Mike Sweeney, Chris Albers, Andy Blitz, Kevin Dorff, Jon Glaser, Michael Gordon, Brian Kiley, Michael Koman, Brian McCann, Guy Nicolucci, Conan O'Brien, Andrew Secunda, Allison Silverman, Robert Smigel, Brian Stack, and Andrew Weinberg
- 2003: Penn & Teller: Bullshit! – Penn Jillette, Teller, David Wechter, and John McLaughlin
- 2004: Late Night with Conan O'Brien – Mike Sweeney, Chris Albers, Jose Arroyo, Andy Blitz, Kevin Dorff, Jon Glaser, Michael Gordon, Brian Kiley, Michael Koman, Brian McCann, Guy Nicolucci, Conan O'Brien, Allison Silverman, Robert Smigel, Brian Stack, and Andrew Weinberg
- 2005: Late Night with Conan O'Brien – Mike Sweeney, Chris Albers, Jose Arroyo, Andy Blitz, Kevin Dorff, Dan Goor, Michael Gordon, Tim Harrod, Berkley Johnson, Brian Kiley, Michael Koman, Brian McCann, Guy Nicolucci, Conan O'Brien, Allison Silverman, Robert Smigel, Brian Stack, and Andrew Weinberg
- 2006: Saturday Night Live – Head Writers: Tina Fey, Seth Meyers, and Andrew Steele; Writers: Doug Abeles, James Anderson, Alex Baze, Liz Cackowski, Charlie Grandy, Steve Higgins, Colin Jost, Erik Kenward, John Lutz, Lorne Michaels, Matt Murray, Paula Pell, Akiva Schaffer, Frank Sebastiano, T. Sean Shannon, Robert Smigel, J.B. Smoove, Emily Spivey, Jorma Taccone, and Bryan Tucker; Additional Sketches by Mike Schwartz and Kristin Gore
- 2007: The Colbert Report – Bryan Adams, Michael Brumm, Stephen Colbert, Rich Dahm, Eric Drysdale, Rob Dubbin, Glenn Eichler, Peter Grosz, Peter Gwinn, Barry Julien, Jay Katsir, Laura Krafft, Frank Lesser, Tom Purcell, and Allison Silverman
- 2008: Saturday Night Live – Head Writers: Seth Meyers, Andrew Steele, and Paula Pell; Writers: Doug Abeles, James Anderson, Alex Baze, Jessican Conrad, James Downey, Charlie Grandy, Steve Higgins, Colin Jost, Erik Kenward, Rob Klein, John Lutz, Lorne Michaels, John Mulaney, Paula Pell, Simon Rich, Marika Sawyer, Akiva Schaffer, Robert Smigel, John Solomon, Emily Spivey, Kent Sublette, Jorma Taccone, and Bryan Tucker; Additional Sketches by Robert Carlock
- 2009: The Daily Show with Jon Stewart – Head Writer: Steve Bodow; Writers: Rory Albanese, Kevin Bleyer, Rich Blomquist, Tim Carvell, Wyatt Cenac, Hallie Haglund, J. R. Havlan, David Javerbaum, Elliott Kalan, Josh Lieb, Sam Means, Jo Miller, John Oliver, Daniel Radosh, Jason Ross, and Jon Stewart
  Saturday Night Live – Head Writer: Seth Meyers; Writers: Doug Abeles, James Anderson, Alex Baze, Jessica Conrad, James Downey, Steve Higgins, Colin Jost, Erik Kenward, Rob Klein, John Lutz, Lorne Michaels, John Mulaney, Paula Pell, Simon Rich, Marika Sawyer, Akiva Schaffer, John Solomon, Emily Spivey, Kent Sublette, Jorma Taccone, and Bryan Tucker; Additional Sketch by Adam McKay and Andrew Steele
- 2010: The Colbert Report – Barry Julien, Dan Guterman, Eric Drysdale, Frank Lesser, Glenn Eichler, Jay Katsir, Max Werner, Meredith Scardino, Michael Brumm, Opus Moreschi, Peter Gwinn, Rich Dahm, Rob Dubbin, Scott Sherman, Stephen Colbert, and Tom Purcell
- 2011: The Colbert Report – Michael Brumm, Stephen Colbert, Rich Dahm, Paul Dinello, Eric Drysdale, Rob Dubbin, Glenn Eichler, Dan Guterman, Peter Gwinn, Jay Katsir, Barry Julien, Frank Lesser, Opus Moreschi, Tom Purcell, Meredith Scardino, Scott Sherman, and Max Werner
- 2012: Portlandia – Fred Armisen, Carrie Brownstein, Karey Dornetto, Jonathan Krisel, and Bill Oakley
- 2013: The Colbert Report – Stephen Colbert, Tom Purcell, Michael Brumm, Nate Charny, Rich Dahm, Paul Dinello, Eric Drysdale, Rob Dubbin, Glenn Eichler, Dan Guterman, Barry Julien, Jay Katsir, Frank Lesser, Opus Moreschi, Bobby Mort, Meredith Scardino, and Max Werner
- 2014: Last Week Tonight with John Oliver – Kevin Avery, Tim Carvell, Dan Gurewitch, Geoff Haggerty, Jeff Maurer, John Oliver, Scott Sherman, Will Tracy, Jill Twiss, and Juli Weiner
- 2015: Real Time with Bill Maher – Scott Carter, Adam Felber, Matt Gunn, Brian Jacobsmeyer, Jay Jaroch, Chris Kelly, Bill Maher, Billy Martin, and Danny Vermont
- 2016: Last Week Tonight with John Oliver – Kevin Avery, Tim Carvell, Josh Gondelman, Dan Gurewitch, Geoff Haggerty, Jeff Maurer, John Oliver, Scott Sherman, Will Tracy, Jill Twiss, and Juli Weiner
- 2017: Last Week Tonight with John Oliver – Tim Carvell, Josh Gondelman, Dan Gurewitch, Geoff Haggerty, Jeff Maurer, John Oliver, Scott Sherman, Will Tracy, Jill Twiss, Juli Weiner, Ben Silva, and Seena Vali
- 2018: Last Week Tonight with John Oliver – Tim Carvell, Raquel D'Apice, Josh Gondelman, Dan Gurewitch, Jeff Maurer, Daniel O'Brien, John Oliver, Brian Parise, Owen Parsons, Ben Silva, Will Tracy, Jill Twiss, Seena Vali, and Juli Weiner
- 2019: Last Week Tonight with John Oliver – Dan Gurewitch, Jeff Maurer, Jill Twiss, Juli Weiner; Writers: Daniel O'Brien, Tim Carvell, John Oliver, Owen Parsons, Charlie Redd, Joanna Rothkopf, Ben Silva, and Seena Vali
- 2020: Desus & Mero – Daniel "Desus Nice" Baker, Claire Friedman, Ziwe Fumudoh, Josh Gondelman, Robert Kornhauser, Joel "The Kid Mero" Martinez, Heben Nigatu, Mike Pielocik, and Julia Young
- 2021: Conan – Matt O'Brien; Writers: Jose Arroyo, Glenn Boozan, Daniel Cronin, Andres du Bouchet, Jessie Gaskell, Skyler Higley, Brian Kiley, Laurie Kilmartin, Todd Levin, Levi MacDougall, Conan O'Brien, Andy Richter, Frank Smiley, Mike Sweeney
- 2022, 2023 and 2024: Last Week Tonight with John Oliver – Johnathan Appel, Ali Barthwell, Tim Carvell, Liz Hynes, Ryan Ken, Mark Kramer, Sofia Manfredi, Daniel O'Brien, John Oliver, Owen Parsons, Taylor Kay Phillips, Charlie Redd, Joanna Rothkopf, Chrissy Shackelford, and Seena Vali
- 2025: Last Week Tonight with John Oliver – Johnathan Appel, Ali Barthwell, Tim Carvell, Liz Hynes, Ryan Ken, Sofia Manfredi, Daniel O'Brien, John Oliver, Owen Parsons, Taylor Kay Phillips, Charlie Redd, Joanna Rothkopf, Chrissy Shackelford, and Seena Vali

==== Best Comedy/Variety – Specials ====
- 1973 (as Best Written Variety Script): Lily – Bob Illes, Rosalyn Drexler, Lorne Michaels, Richard Pryor, Jim Rusk, Herbert Sargent, James R. Stein, Lily Tomlin, Jane Wagner, George Yanok, Ann Elder, Karyl Miller, and Rod Warren
- 1977 and 1978 (as Best Variety Series or Special – Musical or Comedy): The Carol Burnett Show – Ed Simmons, Roger Beatty, Rick Hawkins, Liz Sage, Bob Illes, James R. Stein, Franelle Silver, Larry Siegel, Tim Conway, Bill Richmond, Gene Perret, Dick Clair, and Jenna McMahon
- 1980 (as Best Variety, Musical or Comedy): All Commercials, A Steve Martin Special – Steve Martin, Neal Israel, Jeffrey Barron, Earl Brown, Carmen Finestra, Denny Johnston, Sean Kelly, Pat McCormick, Michael McManus, Pat Proft, and Mason Williams
- 1982 (as Best Variety, Musical or Comedy): I Love Liberty – Rita Mae Brown, Arthur Allan Seidelman, Rick Mitz, Richard Alfieri and Norman Lear
- 1987 (as Variety – Musical, Award, Tribute, Special Event): Will Rogers: Look Back in Laughter – Bennett Tramer
- 1988 (as Variety – Musical, Award, Tribute, Special Event): A Muppet Family Christmas – Jerry Juhl
- 1989 (as Variety – Musical, Award, Tribute, Special Event): The Earth Day Special – Steve Tamerius
- 1989 (as Variety – Musical): Not Necessarily the News – Nancy Harris, Larry Arnstein, Steve Barker, Joe Guppy, Matt Neuman, Duncan Scott McGibbon, Jon Ross, Lane Sarasohn, Steve Young, Merrill Markoe, Tom Kramer, and Peter Ocko
- 1992 (as Variety – Musical, Award, Tribute, Special Event): Medusa: Dare to Be Truthful – Julie Brown and Charlie Coffey
- 1993 (as Variety – Musical, Award, Tribute, Special Event): This Just In (Show 2) – Matt Neuman, Larry Arnstein, Jon Ross, Lane Sarasohn, and John Derevlany
- 1994 (as Variety – Musical, Award, Tribute, Special Event): Tracey Ullman Takes on New York – Tony Sheehan, Dick Clement, Ian La Frenais, Stephen Nathan, and Marc Flanagan
- 1995 (as Variety – Musical, Award, Tribute, Special Event): Dennis Miller Live (Episode 8) – Eddie Feldmann, Jeff Cesario, Ed Driscoll, David Feldman, Gregory Greenberg, Dennis Miller, and Kevin Rooney
- 1996 (as Variety – Musical, Award, Tribute, Special Event): Dennis Miller: Citizen Arcane – Dennis Miller
- 1998 (as Comedy/Variety – Music, Awards, Tributes – Specials – Any Length): Ellen: A Hollywood Tribute – Tim Doyle
- 1999 (as Comedy/Variety – Music, Awards, Tributes – Specials – Any Length): The Kennedy Center Honors: A Celebration of the Performing Arts – Robert Shrum, George Stevens Jr., and Sara Lukinson
- 2000: Saturday Night Live: 25th Anniversary Special – Tina Fey, Anne Beatts, Tom Davis, Steve Higgins, Lorne Michaels, Marilyn Suzanne Miller, Paula Pell, Paul Shaffer, T. Sean Shannon, Michael Shoemaker, and Robert Smigel
- 2001: The Kennedy Center Honors – Don Baer, George Stevens Jr., Sara Lukinson, and Harry Miles Muheim
- 2002: The Kennedy Center Honors – Don Baer, George Stevens Jr., and Sara Lukinson
- 2003: The 75th Annual Academy Awards – Hal Kanter, Rita Cash, Buz Kohan, Steve Martin, Beth Armogida, Dave Barry, Dave Boone, Andy Breckman, Jon Macks, Rita Rudner, Bruce Vilanch
- 2004: The Kennedy Center Honors – George Stevens Jr., Sara Lukinson, and David Leaf
- 2005: The Kennedy Center Honors – George Stevens Jr. and Sara Lukinson
- 2006: National Memorial Day Concert – Joan Meyerson
- 2007: No award given
- 2008: 23rd Independent Spirit Awards – Billy Kimball, Aaron Lee, Jennifer Celotta, and Rainn Wilson
- 2009: 24th Independent Spirit Awards – Billy Kimball and Neal MacLennan
- 2010: National Memorial Day Concert – Joan Meyerson
- 2011: Jimmy Kimmel Live!: After the Academy Awards – Gary Greenberg, Molly McNearney, Tony Barbieri, Jonathan Bines, John N. Huss, Sal Iacono, Eric Immerman, Jimmy Kimmel, Jonathan Kimmel, Jacob Lentz, Danny Ricker, and Richard G. Rosner
- 2012: The 66th Annual Tony Awards – Dave Boone, Paul Greenberg, David Javerbaum, and Adam Schlesinger
- 2013: Blake Shelton's Not So Family Christmas – Jay Martel, Ian Roberts, Alex Rubens, and Charlie Sanders
- 2014: The 71st Golden Globe Awards – Barry Adelman, Alex Baze, Dave Boone, Robert Carlock, Tina Fey, Jon Macks, Sam Means, Seth Meyers, Amy Poehler, and Mike Shoemaker
- 2015: Jimmy Kimmel Live!: 10th Annual After the Oscars Special – Jack Allison, Tony Barbieri, Jonathan Bines, Joelle Boucai, Greg Dorris, Gary Greenberg, Josh Halloway, Sal Iacono, Eric Immerman, Jimmy Kimmel, Bess Kalb, Jeff Loveness, Molly McNearney, Danny Ricker, Joe Strazzullo, Bridger Winegar
- 2016: Triumph's Election Special – Andy Breckman, Josh Comers, Rajan Desai, David Feldman, R. J. Fried, Jarrett Grode, Ben Joseph, Matthew Kirsch, Michael Koman, Mike Lawrence, Brian Reich, Craig Rowin, Robert Smigel, Zach Smilovitz, David Taylor, Andrew Weinberg, Ray James, Jesse Joyce, Jason Reich, and Alex Scordelis
- 2017: 39th Kennedy Center Honors – Dave Boone
- 2018: The Fake News with Ted Nelms – John Aboud, Andrew Blitz, Michael Colton, Ed Helms, Elliott Kalan, Joseph Randazzo, and Sara Schaefer
- 2019: Full Frontal with Samantha Bee Presents: Not the White House Correspondents' Dinner Part 2 – Melinda Taub, Joe Grossman, Nicole Silverberg, Samantha Bee, Kristen Bartlett, Pat Cassels, Sean Crespo, Mike Drucker, Mathan Erhardt, Miles Kahn, Sahar Rizvi, and Allison Silverman
- 2020: Steven Colbert's Election Night 2020: Democracy's Last Stand: Building Back America Great Again Better 2020 – Ariel Dumas, Jay Katsir, Delmonte Bent, Michael Brumm, River Clegg, Aaron Cohen, Stephen T. Colbert, Nicole Conlan, Paul Dinello, Glenn Eichler, Django Gold, Gabe Gronli, Barry Julien, Michael Cruz Kayne, Eliana Kwartler, Matt Lappin, Felipe Torres Medina, Opus Moreschi, Asher Perlman, Tom Purcell, Kate Sidley, Brian Stack, John Thibodeaux, and Steve Waltien
- 2021: Full Frontal Wants to Take Your Guns – Kristen Bartlett, Samantha Bee, Pat Cassels, Sean Crespo, Mike Drucker, Miles Kahn, Chris Thompson, Holly Walker, Allison Silverman, Joe Grossman, Sahar Rizvi, and Michael Rhoa
- 2022: Jerrod Carmichael: Rothaniel – Jerrod Carmichael
- 2023: Sarah Silverman: Someone You Love – Sarah Silverman
- 2024: Nikki Glaser: Someday You'll Die – Nikki Glaser
- 2025: Marc Maron: Panicked – Marc Maron

=== Video games ===
The video game category was first added in 2008, but discontinued after the 2019 awards.

Outstanding Achievement in Video Game Writing

- 2008: Dead Head Fred – Dave Ellis and Adam Cogan
- 2009: Star Wars: The Force Unleashed – Haden Blackman, Shawn Pitman, John Stafford, and Cameron Suey
- 2010: Uncharted 2: Among Thieves – Amy Hennig
- 2011: Assassin's Creed: Brotherhood – Patrice Désilets, Jeffrey Yohalem, and Corey May
- 2012: Uncharted 3: Drake's Deception – Amy Hennig
- 2013: Assassin's Creed III: Liberation – Richard Farrese and Jill Murray
- 2014: The Last of Us – Neil Druckmann
- 2015: The Last of Us: Left Behind – Neil Druckmann
- 2016: Rise of the Tomb Raider – John Stafford, Cameron Suey, Rhianna Pratchett, and Philip Gelatt
- 2017: Uncharted 4: A Thief's End – Neil Druckmann, Josh Scherr, Tom Bissell, and Ryan James
- 2018: Horizon Zero Dawn – John Gonzalez, Benjamin McCaw, Ben Schroder, Anne Toole, Dee Warrick, and Meg Jayanth
- 2019: God of War – Matt Sophos, Richard Zangrande Gaubert, and Cory Barlog

== See also ==
- WGA script registration service
- WGA screenwriting credit system
- 1960 Writers Guild of America strike
- 1988 Writers Guild of America strike
- International Affiliation of Writers Guilds
- 2007–08 Writers Guild of America strike
- List of writing awards
