= 3rd Writers Guild of America Awards =

3rd WGA Awards
- Date: 1951
- Organized by: Writers Guild of America, East and the Writers Guild of America, West

The 3rd Writers Guild of America Awards honored the best film writers of 1950. Winners were announced in 1951.

== Winners and nominees ==
=== Film ===
Winners are listed first highlighted in boldface.

| **Best Written Film Concerning American Scene**: **The Men, Written by Carl Foreman**; Broken Arrow, Screenplay by Albert Maltz; based on the novel by Elliott Arnold; No Way Out, Screenplay by Joseph L.Mankiewicz, and Lesser Samuels; Panic in the Streets, Screenplay by Richard Murphy, Daniel Fuchs, based on a story by Edna Anhalt, and Edward Anhalt; The Asphalt Jungle, Screenplay by Ben Maddow, and John Huston; based on a novel by W. R. Burnett | **Best Written Western**: **Broken Arrow, Screenplay by Albert Maltz**; A Ticket to Tomahawk, Screenplay by Mary Loos, and Richard Sale; Devil's Doorway, Screenplay by Guy Trosper; Rio Grande, Screenplay by James McGuinness; The Gunfighter, Screenplay by William Bowers, and William Sellers; story by William Bowers, and André de Toth; Winchester '73, Screenplay by Robert L. Richards, and Borden Chase; story by Stuart N. Lake |
| **Best Written Musical**: **Annie Get Your Gun, Screenplay by Sidney Sheldon**; My Blue Heaven, Screenplay by Lamar Trotti, and Claude Binyon; Summer Stock, Screenplay by George Wells, and Sy Gomberg; story by Sy Gomberg; The West Point Story, Screenplay by John Monks Jr., Charles Hoffman, and Irving Wallace; Three Little Words, Screenplay by George Wells | **Best Written Drama**: **Sunset Boulevard, Written by Charles Brackett & Billy Wilder & D.M. Marshman Jr.**; All About Eve, Screenplay by Joseph L. Mankiewicz; Panic in the Streets, Screenplay by Richard Murphy; story by Edna Anhalt, and Edward Anhalt; The Asphalt Jungle, Screenplay by Ben Maddow, and John Huston; The Men, Screenplay by Carl Foreman |
| **Best Written Comedy**: **All About Eve, Written by Joseph L. Mankiewicz**; Adam's Rib, Screenplay by Ruth Gordon, and Garson Kanin; Born Yesterday, Screenplay by Albert Mannheimer, based on a Play by Garson Kanin; Father of the Bride, Screenplay by Frances Goodrich and Albert Hackett; based on the novel by Edward Streeter; The Jackpot, Screenplay by Phoebe Ephron, and Henry Ephron; story by John McNulty | |
