= Indian Wedding Blessing =

Poem for weddings of non-Native origin

A poem known variously as the "Indian Wedding Blessing", "Apache Blessing", "Apache Wedding Prayer", "Benediction of the Apaches", "Cherokee Wedding Blessing", and with various forms, is commonly recited at weddings in the United States. The poem is of modern non-Native origin, and is fake folklore (fakelore).

The poem was originally written in 1947 by the non-Native author Elliott Arnold in his Western novel Blood Brother. The novel features Apache culture, but the poem itself is an invention of the author's, and is not based on any traditions of the Apache, Cherokee or any other Native American culture. The poem was popularized by the 1950 film adaptation of the novel, Broken Arrow, scripted by Albert Maltz, and the depiction of the marriage is criticized as a "Hollywood fantasy" (Hollywood Indian stereotype).

== Poem ==
The poem, in its original form in the 1947 novel, begins "Now for you there is no rain / For one is shelter to the other" and ends "Now there is no loneliness. / Now, forever, forever, there is no loneliness". The poem is not associated with any particular religion (aside from being misrepresented as Native American) and does not mention a deity or include a petition, only a wish.

The 1950 film text begins "Now you will feel no rain" and ends "Go now. Ride the white horses to your secret place."

There are now numerous variations of the poem, generally based on the film, rather than the novel. One modern form ends with "May happiness be your companion and your days together be good and long upon the earth."

== Criticism ==
The Economist, citing Rebecca Mead's book on American weddings, characterized it as "'traditionalesque', commerce disguised as tradition".

The poem has gained even wider exposure as a series of Internet memes, often accompanied by stereotypical depictions of Native Americans depicted as Noble savages. That it is continually misrepresented as Apache, Cherokee, or generic "Native American" is an example of both cultural misappropriation and modern fakelore.
