= Writers Guild of America Award for Best Written Film Concerning American Scene =

- Awarded for: Outstanding Writing for a Film Concerning American Scene
- Country: United States
- Presented by: Writers Guild of America
- First award: 1949
- Final award: 1952
- Website: http://www.wga.org/

The Writers Guild Award for Best Written Film Concerning American Scene was an award presented from 1949 to 1952 by the Writers Guild of America, after which it was discontinued.

== Winners & Nominees ==
=== Notes ===
- The year indicates when the film was released. The awards are presented the following year.

Year	Film	Writer(s)
1948 (1st)	The Snake Pit	Frank Partos and Millen Brand
1948 (1st)	All My Sons	Chester Erskine
1948 (1st)	Another Part of the Forest	Vladimir Pozner
1948 (1st)	Apartment for Peggy	George Seaton
1948 (1st)	Call Northside 777	Jerome Cady, and Jay Dratler
1948 (1st)	Command Decision	George Froeschel
1948 (1st)	Cry of the City	Richard Murphy
1948 (1st)	I Remember Mama	Dewitt Bodeen
1948 (1st)	Louisiana Story	Frances H. Flaherty, and Robert Flaherty
1948 (1st)	The Naked City	Albert Maltz, and Malvin Wald
1948 (1st)	The Street with no Name	Harry Kleiner
1949 (2nd)	All the King's Men	Robert Rossen
1949 (2nd)	Home of the Brave	Carl Foreman
1949 (2nd)	Intruder in the Dust	Ben Maddow
1949 (2nd)	Lost Boundaries	Virginia Shaler, and Eugene King
1949 (2nd)	Pinky	Philip Dunne, and Dudley Nichols
1950 (3rd)	The Men	Carl Foreman
1950 (3rd)	Broken Arrow	Albert Maltz
1950 (3rd)	No Way Out	Joseph L.Mankiewicz, and Lesser Samuels
1950 (3rd)	Panic in the Streets	Richard Murphy, Daniel Fuchs
1950 (3rd)	The Asphalt Jungle	Ben Maddow, and John Huston
1951 (4th)	Bright Victory	Robert Henry Buckner
1951 (4th)	A Place in the Sun	Michael Wilson, and Harry Brown
1951 (4th)	Death of a Salesman,	Stanley Roberts
1951 (4th)	Saturday's Hero	Sidney Buchman, and Millard Lampedll
1951 (4th)	The Well	Russell Rouse, and Clarence Green
