= Writers Guild of America Award for Best Written Western =

- Awarded for: Outstanding Writing for a Western Film
- Country: United States
- Presented by: Writers Guild of America
- First award: 1949
- Final award: 1951
- Website: http://www.wga.org/

The Writers Guild Award for Best Written Western was an award presented from 1949 to 1951 by the Writers Guild of America, after which it was discontinued.

== Winners & Nominees ==
=== Notes ===
- The year indicates when the film was released. The awards are presented the following year.

Year	Film	Writer(s)
1948 (1st)	The Treasure of the Sierra Madre	John Huston
1948 (1st)	Fort Apache	Frank S. Nugent
1948 (1st)	Four Faces West	Eugene Manlove Rhodes
1948 (1st)	Fury at Furnace Creek	C. Graham Baker, and Teddi Sherman
1948 (1st)	Green Grass of Wyoming	Martin Berkeley
1948 (1st)	Rachel and the Stranger	Waldo Salt
1948 (1st)	Red River	Borden Chase, and Charles Schnee
1948 (1st)	Station West	Frank Fenton, and Winston Miller
1948 (1st)	The Man From Colorado	Robert Hardy Andrews, and Ben Maddow
1948 (1st)	The Paleface	Edmund L. Hartmann, Frank Tashlin, and Jack Rose
1949 (2nd)	Yellow Sky	Lamar Trotti
1949 (2nd)	She Wore a Yellow Ribbon	Frank S. Nugent, and Laurence Stallings
1949 (2nd)	Streets of Laredo	Charles Marquis Warren
1949 (2nd)	The Gal Who Took the West	William Bowers, and Oscar Brodney
1949 (2nd)	Whispering Smith	Frank Butler, and Karl Kamb
1950 (3rd)	Broken Arrow	Albert Maltz
1950 (3rd)	A Ticket to Tomahawk	Mary Loos, and Richard Sale
1950 (3rd)	Devil's Doorway	Guy Trosper
1950 (3rd)	Rio Grande	James McGuinness
1950 (3rd)	The Gunfighter	William Bowers, and William Sellers
1950 (3rd)	Winchester '73	Robert L. Richards, and Borden Chase
