= 1st Writers Guild of America Awards =

1st WGA Awards
- Date: 1949
- Organized by: Writers Guild of America, East and the Writers Guild of America, West

The 1st Writers Guild of America Awards honored the best film writers of 1948. Winners were announced in 1949.

== Winners and nominees ==
=== Film ===
Winners are listed first highlighted in boldface.

**Best Written Film Concerning American Scene**: **The Snake Pit, Screenplay by Frank Partos and Millen Brand**; All My Sons, Screenplay by Chester Erskine; Another Part of the Forest, Screenplay by Vladimir Pozner; Apartment for Peggy, Screenplay by George Seaton; Call Northside 777, Screenplay by Jerome Cady, and Jay Dratler; Command Decision, Screenplay by William R. Laidlaw, and George Froeschel; Cry of the City, Screenplay by Richard Murphy; I Remember Mama, Screenplay by Dewitt Bodeen; Louisiana Story, Screenplay by Frances H. Flaherty, and Robert Flaherty; The Naked City, Screenplay by Albert Maltz, and Malvin Wald; The Street with No Name, Screenplay by Harry Kleiner	**Best Written Western**: **The Treasure of the Sierra Madre, Screenplay by John Huston**; Fort Apache, Screenplay by Frank S. Nugent; Four Faces West, Screenplay by C. Graham Baker, and Teddi Sherman; Fury at Furnace Creek, Screenplay by Charles G. Booth; Green Grass of Wyoming, Screenplay by Martin Berkeley; Rachel and the Stranger, Screenplay by Waldo Salt; Red River, Screenplay by Borden Chase, and Charles Schnee; Station West, Screenplay by Frank Fenton, and Winston Miller; The Man From Colorado, Screenplay by Robert Hardy Andrews, and Ben Maddow; The Paleface, Screenplay by Edmund L. Hartmann, Frank Tashlin, and Jack Rose
**Best Written Musical**: **Easter Parade, Screenplay by Sidney Sheldon, Frances Goodrich, and Albert Hackett**; Luxury Liner, Screenplay by Gladys Lehman, and Richard Connell; On an Island with You, Screenplay by Dorothy Kingsley, Dorothy Cooper, Charles Martin, and Hans Wilhelm; That Lady in Ermine, Screenplay by Samson Raphaelson; The Emperor Waltz, Screenplay by Charles Brackett, and Billy Wilder; When My Baby Smiles at Me, Screenplay by Lamar Trotti; You Were Meant for Me, Screenplay by Elick Moll, and Valentine Davies	**Best Written Drama**: **The Snake Pit, Screenplay by Frank Partos, and Millen Brand**; All My Sons, Screenplay by Chester Erskine; Another Part of the Forest, Screenplay by Vladimir Pozner; Berlin Express, Screenplay by Harold Medford; Call Northside 777, Screenplay by Jerome Cady, and Jay Dratler; Command Decision, Screenplay by William R. Laidlaw, and George Froeschel; I Remember Mama, Screenplay by Dewitt Bodeen; Johnny Belinda, Screenplay by Irma von Cube, and Allen Vincent; Key Largo, Screenplay by Richard Brooks, and John Huston; Sorry, Wrong Number, Screenplay by Lucille Fletcher; The Naked City, Screenplay by Albert Maltz, and Malvin Wald; The Treasure of the Sierra Madre, Screenplay by John Huston
**Best Written Comedy**: **Sitting Pretty, Screenplay by F. Hugh Herbert**; A Foreign Affair, Screenplay by Charles Brackett, Billy Wilder, and Richard L. Breen; Apartment for Peggy, Screenplay by George Seaton; I Remember Mama, Screenplay by Dewitt Bodeen; June Bride, Screenplay by Ranald Macdougall; Miss Tatlock's Millions, Screenplay by Charles Brackett, and Richard L. Breen; No Minor Vices, Screenplay by Arnold Manoff; The Mating of Millie, Screenplay by Louella MacFarlane, and St. Clair McKelway; The Paleface, Screenplay by Edmund L. Hartmann, Frank Tashlin, and Jack Rose	
