= 4th Writers Guild of America Awards =

4th WGA Awards
- Date: 1952
- Organized by: Writers Guild of America, East and the Writers Guild of America, West

The 4th Writers Guild of America Awards honored the best film writers of 1951. Winners were announced in 1952.

== Winners and nominees ==
=== Film ===
Winners are listed first highlighted in boldface.

**Best Written Film Concerning American Scene**: **Bright Victory, Screenplay by Robert Henry Buckner**; A Place in the Sun, Screenplay by Michael Wilson, and Harry Brown; based on the novel by Theodore Dreiser; Death of a Salesman,, Screenplay by Stanley Roberts; based on the play by Arthur Miller; Saturday's Hero, Screenplay by Sidney Buchman, and Millard Lampedll, based on the novel by Millard Lampell; The Well, Screenplay by Russell Rouse, and Clarence Green	**Best Written Low-budget Film**: **The Steel Helmet, Written by Samuel Fuller**; Five, Screenplay by Arch Oboler; Little Big Horn, Screenplay by Charles Marquis Warren; story by Harold Shumate; Pickup, Screenplay by Hugo Haas, Arnold Lippschitz; based on a novel by Josef Kopta; The First Legion, Screenplay by Emmet Lavery; based on a play by Emmet Lavery
**Best Written Musical**: **An American in Paris, Written by Alan Jay Lerner**; Here Comes the Groom, Screenplay by Virginia Van Upp, Liam O'Brien, and Myles Connolly; On the Riviera, Screenplay by Valentine Davies, Phoebe Ephron, and Henry Ephron; based on a play by Rudolph Lothar, and Hans Adler; Show Boat, Screenplay by John Lee Mahin, based on the play by Jerome Kern, and Oscar Hammerstein II; The Great Caruso, Written by Sonya Levien, and William Ludwig	**Best Written Drama**: **A Place in the Sun, Screenplay by Michael Wilson and Harry Brown**; A Streetcar Named Desire, Written by Tennessee Williams; Death of a Salesman, Screenplay by Stanley Roberts; based on a play by Arthur Miller; Detective Story, Screenplay by Philip Yordan, and Robert Wyler; based on the play by Sidney Kingsley; Fourteen Hours, Screenplay by John Paxton; story by Joel Sayre
**Best Written Comedy**: **Father's Little Dividend, Written by Albert Hackett, and Frances Goodrich**; Angels in the Outfield, Screenplay by Dorothy Kingsley, and George Wells, story by Richard Conlin; People Will Talk, Screenplay by Joseph L. Mankiewicz; based on a play by Curt Goetz; That's My Boy, Screenplay by Cy Howard; You're in the Navy Now, Screenplay by Richard Murphy	
