= Guy Trosper =

American screenwriter

- Born: Guy Walter Trosper; March 27, 1911; Lander, Wyoming, U.S.
- Died: December 19, 1963 (aged 52); Sherman Oaks, Los Angeles, California, U.S.
- Resting place: Mount Hope Cemetery; Lander, Wyoming, U.S.
- Occupation: Screenwriter
- Years active: 1941–1963
- Spouse: Betty Bolster (m. 1940)
- Children: 2

Guy Walter Trosper (March 27, 1911 – December 19, 1963) was an American screenwriter. He was best known for his work in the films The Stratton Story (1949), Devil's Doorway (1950), The Pride of St. Louis (1952), Jailhouse Rock (1957), One-Eyed Jacks (1961), Birdman of Alcatraz (1962), and The Spy Who Came In from the Cold (1965).

Trosper began his film career as a reader for Samuel Goldwyn and became a screenwriter in 1941. He was nominated for an Academy Award in 1953 and posthumously won an Edgar Award in 1966.

== Early life ==
Trosper was born in Lander, Wyoming on March 27, 1911, the son of Ruth Calista (née Edgcomb) and Charles Alfred Trosper. His younger sister was Kathryn Naomi Popper (née Trosper).

== Personal life and death ==
Trosper was married to Genevieve Dorothy "Betty" Bolster from 1940 until his death in 1963. They had two children, Julie and Jeffrey.

Trosper died in his sleep of a heart attack at his home in Sherman Oaks, Los Angeles, California on December 19, 1963, at age 52. He was buried in Mount Hope Cemetery in his home town of Lander, Wyoming.

== Filmography ==
- I'll Wait for You (1941)
- Crossroads (1942)
- Girl Trouble (1942)
- Eyes in the Night (1942)
- The True Glory (1945)
- The Stratton Story (1949)
- Devil's Doorway (1950)
- Inside Straight (1951)
- The Pride of St. Louis (1952)
- The Steel Cage (1954)
- The Americano (1955)
- Many Rivers to Cross (1955)
- The Girl He Left Behind (1956)
- Jailhouse Rock (1957)
- Darby's Rangers (1958)
- Thunder in the Sun (1959)
- One-Eyed Jacks (1961)
- Birdman of Alcatraz (1962), which he also produced
- The Spy Who Came In from the Cold (1965)

== Awards and nominations ==
Year	Award	Category	Nominated work	Result
1951	Writers Guild of America Awards	Best Written Western	Devil's Doorway	Nominated
1953	Academy Awards	Best Story	The Pride of St. Louis	Nominated
1963	Writers Guild of America Awards	Best Written Drama	Birdman of Alcatraz	Nominated
1966	Edgar Allan Poe Awards	Best Motion Picture Screenplay (shared with Paul Dehn)	The Spy Who Came In from the Cold	Won
1966	Writers Guild of America Awards	Best Written Drama (shared with Paul Dehn)	The Spy Who Came In from the Cold	Nominated
