= Death of a Salesman (1951 film) =

1951 film

- Theatrical release poster
- Directed by: László Benedek
- Screenplay by: Stanley Roberts
- Based on: Death of a Salesman; 1949 play by Arthur Miller
- Produced by: Stanley Kramer
- Starring: Fredric March; Mildred Dunnock; Kevin McCarthy; Cameron Mitchell; Howard Smith
- Cinematography: Franz Planer
- Edited by: Harry Gerstad; William A. Lyon
- Music by: Alex North
- Production company: Columbia Pictures
- Release date: December 20, 1951
- Running time: 115 minutes
- Country: United States
- Language: English
- Box office: $1.2 million (US rental)

Death of a Salesman is a 1951 American tragedy film adapted from the 1949 play of the same name by Arthur Miller. It was directed by László Benedek and written for the screen by Stanley Roberts. The film received many honors, including four Golden Globe Awards, the Volpi Cup, and five Oscar nominations, including one for the musical score, written by Alex North, who had also written the music for the Broadway production.

== Plot ==
Traveling salesman Willy Loman has spent his entire life working on the road. He had good luck in his younger years and makes a reasonable living, but he is now 60 and all of his old business contacts have retired or died. When his company stops paying his salary in favor of a straight commission, he begins to mentally deteriorate, talking to himself and attempting suicide multiple times. He tries to kill himself by crashing his car and purchases a pipe that he plans to use in order to gas himself. When his son Biff returns home after several months in jail, Willy and Biff clash.

Willy's wife supports him, but he soon begins talking loudly to himself and yelling at others, slipping into the past and the present, frantically trying to find where he had gone wrong. When he is finally fired, exhausted from the emotional rift with Biff and the devastation of losing his job, Willy again purposely crashes his car, killing himself. An insurance policy is paid to the Loman family, as Willy felt that he was worth more dead than alive.

== Cast ==
- Fredric March as Willy Loman
- Mildred Dunnock as Linda Loman
- Kevin McCarthy as Biff Loman
- Cameron Mitchell as Happy Loman
- Howard Smith as Charley
- Royal Beal as Ben
- Don Keefer as Bernard
- Jesse White as Stanley
- Claire Carleton as Miss Francis
- David Alpert as Howard Wagner

== Production ==
The cast consisted principally of the Broadway cast, with the addition of Kevin McCarthy from the original London cast. However, Fredric March replaced Broadway actor Lee J. Cobb after concerns arose over Cobb's past as a communist sympathizer.

Director László Benedek took great care that the film should closely follow the play. The script contains many of Arthur Miller's lines verbatim, sometimes removing only small bits of dialogue. However, Miller, who had no involvement with or control over the film, claimed that it was ruined by the truncation of key scenes. Benedek also stressed the dreary, middle-class setting of the film, using small rooms and gray shots.

Just before the film was to be released, Miller threatened to sue Columbia Studios over Career of a Salesman, the 10-minute short film that was to precede Death of a Salesman in theaters. Career of a Salesman showed what the producers believed to be a more typical American salesman and was an attempt to defuse possible accusations that Death of a Salesman was an anti-American film. Columbia eventually agreed to remove the short for the film's theatrical run. Miller saw Career of a Salesman as an attack upon his work, proclaiming: "Why the hell did you make the picture if you're so ashamed of it? Why should anybody not get up and walk out of the theater if Death of a Salesman is so outmoded and pointless?" He argued against the portrayal of the salesman profession as "a wonderful profession, that people thrived on it, and there were no problems at all". Miller also felt that Benedek's direction managed to "chop off almost every climax of the play as though with a lawnmower" and portray Loman as a lunatic rather than a victim.

== Reception ==
In a contemporary review for The New York Times, critic Bosley Crowther wrote:

Where the earlier performance of the drama on the stage used the syntax of the screen, with time and location shifting often with the wandering of the man's mind, such movement and flow are thoroughly natural and consistent in the cinematic form. Past and present are run together with perfect smoothness and striking clarity in the film. Furthermore, Mr. Kramer's production is so faithfully transcribed and well designed that it stands as a nigh exact translation of Mr. Miller's play, both in its psychological candor and its exhibit of a bleak bourgeois milieu. Except for a few small omissions of dialogue lines and words, the drama is offered in toto, right down to its torturing graveyard scene. And the whole atmosphere of middle-class drabness, which was visually strained on the stage, is here given full exhibition in skimpy bedrooms, kitchens and backyards. ... "Death of a Salesman" is dismally depressing, but it must be acclaimed a film that whips you about in a whirlpool somewhere close to the center of life.

Critic Edwin Schallert of the Los Angeles Times wrote:

With fortissimo power Stanley Kramer brings "Death of a Salesman" to the screen as a daring challenge to the picture-going public, and a fine strong exhibit to attract the attention of many who do not regularly follow film entertainment. ... The March portrayal is, indeed, a sensational one. The actor might be said to fling everything that he has or has ever known through his association with the theater into this particular portrayal. ... The nerve tension that he gives to the character, so essential to this particular presentation, is in the class of the overwhelming.

Despite its positive critical reception, the film was a box-office failure. It is believed that its subject matter regarding the failure of the American dream contributed to the film's poor performance.

== Awards ==
Award	Category	Nominee(s)	Result	Ref.
Academy Awards	Best Actor	Fredric March	Nominated	
Academy Awards	Best Supporting Actor	Kevin McCarthy	Nominated	
Academy Awards	Best Supporting Actress	Mildred Dunnock	Nominated	
Academy Awards	Best Cinematography – Black-and-White	Franz Planer	Nominated	
Academy Awards	Best Scoring of a Dramatic or Comedy Picture	Alex North	Nominated	
British Academy Film Awards	Best Film		Nominated	
British Academy Film Awards	Best Foreign Actor	Fredric March	Nominated	
Directors Guild of America Awards	Outstanding Directorial Achievement in Motion Pictures	László Benedek	Nominated	
Golden Globe Awards	Best Actor in a Motion Picture – Drama	Fredric March	Won	
Golden Globe Awards	Best Director – Motion Picture	László Benedek	Won	
Golden Globe Awards	Best Cinematography – Black and White	Franz Planer	Won	
Golden Globe Awards	New Star of the Year – Actor	Kevin McCarthy	Won	
National Board of Review Awards	Top Ten Films		4th Place	
Venice Film Festival	Golden Lion	László Benedek	Nominated	
Venice Film Festival	Best Actor	Fredric March	Won	
Writers Guild of America Awards	Best Written Drama	Stanley Roberts	Nominated	
Writers Guild of America Awards	Best Written Film Concerning American Scene	Stanley Roberts	Nominated	

New York Times Critics' Pick

- Top 1,000

== Legacy ==
In 2013, Sony Pictures funded a restoration of the film. The digital pictures were digitally restored, frame by frame, at Prasad Corporation to remove dirt, tears, scratches and other artifacts. The restoration was part of the Stanley Kramer 100-year celebration (Kramer would have been 100 years old on September 29, 2013).

== Home video ==
Death of a Salesman has been released on DVD format by Movies Unlimited. It has also been made available on various streaming platforms, such as Amazon Prime Video and YouTube.
