= Sidney Buchman =

American screenwriter and film producer (1902–1975)

- Born: Sidney Robert Buchman; March 27, 1902; Duluth, Minnesota, U.S.
- Died: August 23, 1975 (aged 73); Cannes, Provence-Alpes-Côte d'Azur, France
- Other name: Sydney Buchman
- Occupations: Screenwriter, film producer
- Relatives: Michael B. Silver (grandson); Amanda Silver (granddaughter)

Sidney Robert Buchman (March 27, 1902 – August 23, 1975) was an American screenwriter and film producer who worked on about 40 films from the late 1920s to the early 1970s. He received four Oscar nominations and won once for Best Screenplay for the fantasy romantic comedy film Here Comes Mr. Jordan (1941), sharing the award with Seton I. Miller.

== Background ==
Born to a Jewish family in Duluth, Minnesota and educated at Columbia University, where he was a member of the Philolexian Society, he served as President of the Screen Writers Guild of America from 1941 to 1942.

== Career ==
Buchman was one of the most successful Hollywood screenwriters of the 1930s and 1940s.

His scripts from this period include The Right to Romance (1933), She Married Her Boss (1935), The King Steps Out (1936), Theodora Goes Wild (1936) and Holiday (1938). He would go on to receive Academy Award nominations for his writing on Mr. Smith Goes to Washington (1939), The Talk of the Town (1942), and Jolson Sings Again (1949), winning an Oscar for Here Comes Mr. Jordan (1941). He also did uncredited work on various films during this period, notably The Awful Truth. He was the 1965 recipient of the Laurel Award of the Writers Guild of America, West.

Buchman's refusal to provide the names of American Communist Party members to the House Un-American Activities Committee led to a charge of contempt of Congress. Buchman was fined, given a year's suspended sentence, and was then blacklisted by the Hollywood movie studio bosses.

He returned to screenwriting in the 1960s, working on Cleopatra (1963) and The Group (1966).

== Personal life ==
Buchman was a supporter of Franklin Roosevelt.

Buchman married twice and had one daughter, Susanna Silver, with his first wife. His granddaughter and grandson are Amanda Silver and Michael B. Silver, respectively. With his second wife, he had another daughter, Carla. He died in his adopted home in Cannes on August 24, 1975, at the age of 73.

== Selected filmography ==
- She Married Her Boss (1935)
- The Music Goes 'Round (1936)
- The King Steps Out (1936)
- Adventure in Manhattan (1936)
- She Married An Artist (1937)
- Mr. Smith Goes to Washington (1939)
- The Howards of Virginia (1940)
- Here Comes Mr. Jordan (1941)

== Awards and nominations ==
Year	Award	Category	Nominated work	Result
1940	12th Academy Awards	Best Screenplay	Mr. Smith Goes to Washington	Nominated
1942	14th Academy Awards	Best Screenplay (shared with Seton I. Miller)	Here Comes Mr. Jordan	Won
1943	15th Academy Awards	Best Screenplay (shared with Irwin Shaw)	The Talk of the Town	Nominated
1950	22nd Academy Awards	Best Story and Screenplay	Jolson Sings Again	Nominated
1950	2nd Writers Guild of America Awards	Best Written Musical	Jolson Sings Again	Nominated
1952	4th Writers Guild of America Awards	Best Written Film Concerning Problems with the American Scene (shared with Millard Lampell)	Saturday's Hero	Nominated

Sidney Buchman received a Laurel Award for Screenwriting Achievement at the 17th Writers Guild of America Awards on March 17, 1965.
