= The Pride of St. Louis =

1952 film by Harmon Jones

- Theatrical release poster
- Directed by: Harmon Jones
- Screenplay by: Herman J. Mankiewicz
- Story by: Guy Trosper
- Produced by: Jules Schermer
- Starring: Dan Dailey; Joanne Dru; Richard Crenna
- Cinematography: Leo Tover
- Edited by: Robert L. Simpson
- Music by: Arthur Lange
- Distributed by: 20th Century-Fox
- Release date: May 2, 1952
- Running time: 93 minutes
- Country: United States
- Language: English
- Box office: $1.7 million (US rentals)

The Pride of St. Louis is a 1952 American biographical film of the life of Major League Baseball Hall of Fame pitcher Dizzy Dean. It starred Dan Dailey as Dean, Joanne Dru as his wife, and Richard Crenna as his brother Paul "Daffy" Dean, also a major league pitcher. It was directed by Harmon Jones.

Guy Trosper was nominated for an Academy Award for Best Story.

Much of the plotline is reasonably close to the facts of Dizzy Dean's life and baseball career; however, the climax is fictionalized, based on an on-air comment he made regarding his use of the word "Ain't": "A lot of folks who ain't sayin' 'ain't,' ain't eatin'. So, Teach, you learn 'em English, and I'll learn 'em baseball." The story arc covers Dean's rise to pitching superstardom, the early end of his career, and his redemption through radio broadcasting.

The screenplay was the last by Herman J. Mankiewicz, who earlier had co-written the script for the Lou Gehrig biography The Pride of the Yankees.

== Plot ==
A scout for the St. Louis Cardinals comes to a small town in the Ozarks to assess pitcher Jerome Herman Dean (Dailey). Dean, with an over-abundance of self-confidence, is certain that the club wants him to start immediately and is surprised that he is sent to the minor league Houston Buffaloes. Despite his obvious talents, Dean is teased about his rustic clothes and goes to a department store to buy new suits. He meets pretty credit officer Patricia Nash (Dru) and courts her with great vigor. At an exhibition between the Buffaloes and the Chicago White Sox, Dean is dismayed to see Pat with another man but pitches an almost perfect game. The White Sox players razz Dean, calling him "Dizzy", but he adopts the nickname, which is picked up by sports reporters. Dean asks Pat to elope, and although she is stunned by his proposal, agrees to marry him.

Dizzy, now his team's star pitcher, is told to report to the Cardinals for spring training. Dean is delighted and becomes a colorful story for baseball reporters. The next spring his brother Paul (Crenna) joins Dizzy in St. Louis, and the irrepressible Dean brothers promote the team by acting as ushers, selling tickets in the box office and even cavorting with the marching band. Their antics get them into trouble, however, and when they are fined by the team's manager, Frankie Frisch, Dizzy goes on strike. Pat urges him to stop being stubborn and Dizzy storms out of their apartment. He meets Johnny Kendall, a businessman who relies on crutches and a specially equipped car to get around. Johnny's quiet acceptance of his handicap humbles Dizzy and he ends his strike. The Dean brothers lead the Cardinals to victory in the World Series.

Dizzy soon suffers an injury when a line drive breaks one of his toes. He egotistically returns to pitching too soon, despite being warned that he is risking serious injury to his pitching arm. Dizzy's ability to pitch declines, and eventually even a minor league team lets him go. Dizzy refuses to accept that his baseball career is over and tries to forget his troubles by drinking and gambling. Unable to endure his self-destructive behavior, Pat leaves him, telling him she will not return until he "grows up." Dizzy is devastated and asks Johnny for a job as a salesman. Dizzy is instead given a job broadcasting baseball games on their radio station. Dizzy's thick Arkansas accent, often twisted English, and colorful stories make him an instant hit.

An irate group of teachers oppose Dizzy, saying that his poor English is a bad influence on children. Dizzy is stung by the charge and decides to quit. During his final broadcast, Dean gives the children of St. Louis heartfelt instructions to pursue their education, then returns home, where Pat is waiting for him. The head of the teacher's group calls Dizzy to say that his last broadcast deeply moved the committee and tells him: "We'll keep teaching the children English and you keep on learning them baseball."

== Cast ==
- Dan Dailey as Jerome Herman "Dizzy" Dean
- Joanne Dru as Patricia Nash Dean
- Richard Crenna as Paul Dean
- Richard Hylton as Johnny Kendall
- Hugh Sanders as Horst
- James Brown as Moose
- Leo Cleary as Houston Manager Ed Monroe
- Chet Huntley as KWK Announcer Tom Weaver

== See also ==
- List of baseball films
