= Michael Blankfort =

American screenwriter (1907–1982)

- Born: December 10, 1907; New York City, New York
- Died: July 13, 1982 (aged 74); Los Angeles, California
- Occupations: Screenwriter; Writer; Playwright
- Spouse(s): 1st) Laurette Spingarn; 2nd) Dorothy Stiles
- Writing career
- Notable works: Broken Arrow (1950) (front for Albert Maltz); The Caine Mutiny; The Juggler (film)(novel and film adaptation)

Michael Seymour Blankfort (December 10, 1907 – July 13, 1982) was an American screenwriter, writer of books and playwright. He served as a front for the blacklisted Albert Maltz on the Academy Award-nominated screenplay of Broken Arrow (1950). He was born in New York City and died in Los Angeles.

== Film career ==
The Writers Guild of America, West, in its 1991 restoration of credit for the Broken Arrow screenplay to Maltz, expressed "a strong statement of appreciation for the courage of screenwriter Michael Blankfort" for his action in fronting for Maltz, in which Blankfort "risked being blacklisted himself to help his friend". Among his own screenplays were The Juggler (1953) and The Caine Mutiny. He was president of the Writers Guild of America, West from 1967 to 1969 and won the Guild's Valentine Davies Award (along with Norman Corwin) in 1972. He also served on the Board of Governors of The Academy of Motion Picture Arts and Sciences from 1969 to 1971.

== Art collection ==
Michael Blankfort and his wife Dorothy Stiles Blankfort were among the founding members of the Los Angeles Contemporary Art Council, a group of prominent local art collectors connected to the Los Angeles County Museum of Art. The Blankforts donated over 400 pieces of art to the museum, including works by Yves Klein, Willem de Kooning and Arshile Gorky.

== Bibliography ==
- "Battle hymn; a play in three acts, prologues and an epilogue". (with Michael Gold) New York, Los Angeles, London: S. French, 1936.
- "The crime". New York: New York Theatre League, 1936.
- "The brave and the blind : a one-act drama". New York: S. French, 1937.
- "A Time to Live". New York: Harcourt Brace, 1943.
- "The Big Yankee: The Life of Carlson of the Raiders". Boston: Little, Brown and Company, 1947.
- "Monique: A Drama in Two Acts". (with wife Dorothy Stiles Blankfort) New York: S. French, 1957.
- "An Exceptional Man – A Novel of Incest". New York: Antheneum, 1980.

== Filmography ==
As screenwriter:

- Blind Alley (1939)
- Adam Had Four Sons (1941)
- Texas (1941)
- Flight Lieutenant (1942)
- An Act of Murder (1948)
- The Dark Past (1948)
- Broken Arrow (1950) (as front for Albert Maltz)
- Halls of Montezuma (1951)
- My Six Convicts (1952)
- Lydia Bailey (1952)
- The Juggler (1953)
- The Caine Mutiny (1954) (additional dialogue)
- Untamed (1955)
- Tribute to a Bad Man (1956)
- The Vintage (1957)
- See How They Run (1964)
- The Plainsman (1966)
- A Fire in the Sky (1978)

As associate producer:

- The Juggler (1953)

== Awards ==
1953: National Jewish Book Award for The Juggler
