= The Juggler (film) =

1953 film

- Theatrical poster
- Directed by: Edward Dmytryk
- Screenplay by: Michael Blankfort
- Based on: The Juggler; 1952 novel by Michael Blankfort
- Produced by: Stanley Kramer
- Starring: Kirk Douglas
- Cinematography: J. Roy Hunt
- Edited by: Aaron Stell
- Music by: George Antheil
- Production company: Stanley Kramer Productions
- Distributed by: Columbia Pictures
- Release date: May 5, 1953 (New York City)
- Running time: 86 minutes
- Country: United States
- Language: English

The Juggler is a 1953 American drama war film starring Kirk Douglas as a survivor of the Holocaust. The screenplay was adapted by Michael Blankfort from his novel of the same title. It was the first American feature film that was made in Israel.

== Plot ==
After World War II, German Hans Müller is one of a shipload of Jewish refugees who disembark at Haifa in 1949 and are placed in a refugee camp. Like many other concentration camp survivors, Hans has psychological problems, including survivor guilt. At one point, he mistakes a woman and some children for his murdered family.

At the first opportunity, he sneaks out of the refugee camp and goes into the city. When he spots a policeman, Hans panics and reacts by fleeing. The policeman chases him down and begins questioning him. Hans becomes very agitated and attacks, leaving the man unconscious in the street. Hans flees and ends up sleeping in the countryside, where he is found by a teenage orphan Sabra, Yehoshua "Josh" Bresler. Hans pretends to be an eccentric American, out to see Israel firsthand. Josh offers to be his guide. During their journey, Hans reveals that he was a professional juggler; Josh persuades him to pass on his knowledge. Meanwhile, police detective Karni sets out to track the fugitive down.

On their journey, Josh is injured when they wander into a minefield near the kibbutz. He is taken to the medical centre in the kibbutz; he has only broken his leg. While Josh recovers, Hans becomes acquainted with Ya'el, one of the residents. They are attracted to each other, but he at first strongly resists her attempt to persuade him to remain at the kibbutz. He reveals to her that he had ignored warnings from friends to flee Nazi Germany before it was too late, making the fatal mistake of counting on his fame and popularity to protect his family. Gradually, however, he begins to settle in.

Karni finally tracks Hans down and tries to take him into custody. Hans panics again and barricades himself in Ya'el's room with her rifle, but Ya'el and Karni get him to admit he needs help and to give himself up.

== Cast ==
- Kirk Douglas as Hans Müller
- Milly Vitale as Ya'el
- Paul Stewart as Detective Karni
- Joseph Walsh as Yehoshua Bresler
- Alf Kjellin as Daniel
- Beverly Washburn as Susy, a young refugee girl Hans befriends in Haifa
- Charles Lane as Rosenberg
- John Banner as Emile Halevy, the sole witness to Hans' assault on the policeman
- Richard Benedict as Police Officer Kogan
- Oskar Karlweis as Willy Schmidt

== Production ==
The film, described as a "prestige ingathering" for Kramer, was directed by non-Jew Edward Dmytryk, who had directed Crossfire, a 1947 film about anti-Semitism. The musical score was by avant-garde composer George Antheil, whose best known composition was the Ballet Mécanique. Douglas had worked with Kramer in Champion, the 1949 film that earned Douglas an Academy Award nomination.

The Juggler was one of the movies that producer Stanley Kramer made for Columbia Pictures as part of a $25-million thirty-film deal in 1951. Screenwriter Michael Blankfort was initially supposed to have directed the film, but was denied a passport because of his failure to exonerate himself of alleged membership in the Communist Party. His replacement, Dmytryk, ironically was a member of the Hollywood Ten accused Communists.

Israel was anxious for the film to be made, for financial as well as propaganda reasons, and Israelis were upset that while all but one outdoor scene was filmed in Israel, indoor scenes were shot at studios in Los Angeles for contractual reasons. The producers initially sought to hire German actress Ursula Thiess for the role of Ya'el, but the Israeli consul in Los Angeles protested that doing so would "create a very unwelcome and unnecessary controversy."

Filming took place in Israel in late 1952 in Haifa, the kibbutz Hanita on the border with Lebanon and other locations in the Upper Galilee. One scene was shot in a ruined house in Iqrit, a Christian Arab town whose residents were relocated by Israeli forces during the 1948 Arab-Israeli War. The filming took place shortly after the village was blown up by the Israel Defense Forces, which had caused an international controversy, though the army required that the village itself not be filmed and its name not be mentioned.

== Reception ==
New York Times critic Bosley Crowther wrote that "thanks to the conception and to the performance that Mr. Douglas gives, a strong and compelling sense of character and of human pathos does come through." He said that the film "may not be entirely consistent dramatically, but it offers a fast and fascinating journey through modern Israel, in addition to an intriguing and often touching study of a man."

Variety said the film was "smartly presented without undue race or religious emphasis, so the entertainment is non-sectarian."

== Legacy ==
Writing in The Forward after Kirk Douglas' death in 2020, Henry Sapoznik called The Juggler the "Jewish Kirk Douglas film that everyone seems to have forgotten," and said that it was not only the first film to conflate Holocaust atrocities and the promise of Jewish healing in the newly formed state of Israel, but – thanks to Kramer's passion for verisimilitude — also the first Hollywood film to shoot there." Sapoznik observed that the film was largely forgotten because of the success of the Otto Preminger film Exodus in 1960, which also was filmed in Israel and was in rich Technicolor, unlike the black and white Juggler.

In their book Hollywood and Israel: A History (2022), Tony Shaw and Giora Goodman note that since Iqrit has since been completely demolished, the scene shot there has "in retrospect an unexpected documentary power and symbolic significance that neither the filmmakers nor the Israeli authorities could have ever envisaged."
