= Elliott Arnold =

American writer (1912–1980)

Elliot Arnold
- Born: September 13, 1912; Brooklyn, New York, United States
- Died: May 13, 1980 (aged 67); New York City, New York, United States
- Occupations: Newspaper feature writer; novelist; screenwriter
- Spouse: Glynis Johns (m. 1964)

Elliott Arnold (September 13, 1912 – May 13, 1980) was an American newspaper feature writer, novelist, and screenwriter. Born in Brooklyn, New York, he became a feature writer with the New York World-Telegram and authored dozens of novels.

== Career ==
Among his books, Elliott Arnold is probably best known for his 1947 novel Blood Brother, which was adapted into the acclaimed 1950 motion picture Broken Arrow and a 1956 TV series of the same name. The popular Indian Wedding Blessing is based on a passage from Blood Brother. His 1949 biography of Sigmund Romberg was made into the 1954 musical film, Deep in My Heart; his 1956 novel Rescue! was adapted into the 1964 film Flight from Ashiya about the U.S. Air Force's Air Rescue Service.

== Personal life ==
Arnold married actress Glynis Johns on October 1, 1964, in Los Angeles, California, having announced their engagement on June 24, though they subsequently divorced on January 4, 1973. Written by Arnold, A Night of Watching (1967) was dedicated to her.

He died in New York City on May 13, 1980, at the age of sixty-seven.

== Published books ==
- Two Loves (1934)
- Personal Combat (1936)
- Only The Young (1939)
- Nose for News; The Way of Life of a Reporter (1941)
- Finlandia! The Story of Sibelius (1941)
- Commandos: A Novel (1942; adapted into 1943 American war film First Comes Courage)
- First Comes Courage (1943)
- Tomorrow Will Sing (1945; also published as an Armed Services Edition)
- Blood Brother (1947; University of Nebraska Press; also published as an Armed Services Edition; adapted into 1950 American Western film Broken Arrow)
- Everybody Slept Here (1948)
- Deep in My Heart, a Story Based on the Life of Sigmund Romberg (1949)
- Walk with the Devil (1950)
- The Time of the Gringo (1953)
- Broken Arrow (1954)
- White Falcon (1955)
- Rescue! (1956; repressed as Flight from Ashiya in 1959)
- Brave Jimmy Stone (1962)
- A Night of Watching (1967)
- Kind of Secret Weapon (1969)
- Code of Conduct: A Novel (1970)
- Forests of the Night (1971)
- Spirit of Cochise (1972)
- Proving Ground: A Novel (1973)
- Camp Grant Massacre: A Novel (1976)
- Quicksand: A Novel of the City (1977)

== See also ==
- Indian Wedding Blessing
