= 2nd Writers Guild of America Awards =

2nd WGA Awards
- Date: 1950
- Organized by: Writers Guild of America, East and the Writers Guild of America, West

The 2nd Writers Guild of America Awards honored the best film writers of 1949. Winners were announced in 1950.

== Winners and nominees ==
=== Film ===
Winners are listed first highlighted in boldface.

**Best Written Film Concerning American Scene**: **All the King's Men, Screenplay by Robert Rossen**; Home of the Brave, Screenplay by Carl Foreman; Intruder in the Dust, Screenplay Ben Maddow; based on the Novel by William Faulner; Lost Boundaries, Screenplay by Virginia Shaler, and Eugene King; Pinky, Screenplay by Philip Dunne & Dudley Nichols	**Best Written Western**: **Yellow Sky, Story by W.R. Burnett, Screenplay by W.R. Burnett and Lamar Trotti**; She Wore a Yellow Ribbon, Screenplay by Frank S. Nugent, and Laurence Stallings; based on the story "The Big Hunt" and "War Party" by James Warner Bellah; Streets of Laredo, Screenplay by Charles Marquis Warren; The Gal Who Took the West, Screenplay by William Bowers, and Oscar Brodney; Whispering Smith, Screenplay by Frank Butler, and Karl Kamb
**Best Written Musical**: **On the Town, Written by Adolph Green & Betty Comden; based on the play by Adolph Green, and Betty Comden**; In the Good Old Summertime, Screenplay by Albert Hackett, Frances Goodrich, and Ivan Tors; Jolson Sings Again, Screenplay by Sidney Buchman; Take Me Out to the Ball Game, Screenplay by Harry Tugend, and George Wells; story by Gene Kelly, and Stanley Donen; The Barkleys of Broadway, Screenplay by Betty Comden, and Adolph Green; You're My Everything, Screenplay by Lamar Trotti, and Will Hays Jr.	**Best Written Drama**: **All the King's Men, Screenplay by Robert Rossen**; Battleground, Screenplay by Robert Pirosh; Champion, Screenplay by Carl Foreman; story by Ring Lardner; Intruder in the Dust, Screenplay Ben Maddow; based on the Novel by William Faulner; The Hasty Heart, Screenplay by Ranald MacDougall, based on the Play by John Patrick; The Heiress, Screenplay by Ruth Goetz, and August Goetz; The Window, Screenplay by Mel Dinelli; based on the story "The Boy Cried Murder" by Cornell Woolrich
**Best Written Comedy**: **A Letter to Three Wives, Screenplay by Joseph L. Mankiewicz**; Adam's Rib, Screenplay by Ruth Gordon, and Garson Kanin; Come to the Stable, Screenplay by Oscar Millard, and Sally Benson; story by Clare Boothe Luce; Every Girl Should Be Married, Screenplay by Stephen Morehouse Avery; written by Don Hartman; story by Eleanor Harris; I Was a Male War Bride, Screenplay by Charles Lederer, Leonard Spigel, and Hagar Wilde; story by Henri Rochard; It Happens Every Spring, Screenplay by Valentine Davies; based on a story by Shirley W. Smith, and Valentine Davies	
