= Devil's Doorway =

1950 film by Anthony Mann

- Theatrical release poster
- Directed by: Anthony Mann
- Screenplay by: Guy Trosper
- Produced by: Nicholas Nayfack
- Starring: Robert Taylor; Louis Calhern; Paula Raymond
- Cinematography: John Alton
- Edited by: Conrad A. Nervig
- Music by: Daniele Amfitheatrof
- Production company: Metro-Goldwyn-Mayer
- Distributed by: Metro-Goldwyn-Mayer
- Release date: September 15, 1950
- Running time: 84 minutes
- Country: United States
- Language: English
- Budget: $1,373,000
- Box office: $2,096,000

Devil's Doorway is a 1950 American MGM Western film directed by Anthony Mann and starring Robert Taylor, Louis Calhern and Paula Raymond. The plot concerns the bigotry faced by an American Indian war veteran in his hometown.

== Plot ==
Lance Poole, a Shoshone veteran of the Civil War and Medal of Honor recipient, returns to his home in Medicine Bow, Wyoming, where the mostly white townspeople resent the fact that Poole and his father own a large and valuable piece of land. A doctor refuses to treat Poole's father, who dies, and Poole is unable to even buy a drink at the local saloon. Bigoted attorney Verne Coolan exploits a loophole in a homesteading law to strip Poole of his property. Poole turns to a female lawyer Orrie Masters for help but she fails to acquire the necessary petition signatures that they need to overturn the law.

Coolan organizes sheepherders and attempts to expel Poole by force. Shoshone tribesmen fight by Poole's side, using his cabin for a fort. Masters summons the U.S. Cavalry to create a truce, but they side with Coolan and the town. Poole kills Coolan but is seriously wounded at the Shoshone barricade.

Poole grants the responsibility for the surviving women and children to the only surviving male child, who leads them away from the barricade and presumably in the direction of the reservation. Afterward, Poole wears his Civil War sergeant major uniform and walks out to the cavalry commander and his former lawyer. The commander salutes Poole first, as that is the custom when greeting a Medal of Honor recipient. Poole then dies from his wounds.

== Cast ==
- Robert Taylor (in brownface) as Lance Poole
- Louis Calhern as Verne Coolan
- Paula Raymond as Orrie Masters
- Marshall Thompson as Rod MacDougall
- James Mitchell as Red Rock
- Edgar Buchanan as Zeke Carmody
- Rhys Williams as Scotty MacDougall
- Spring Byington as Mrs. Masters
- James Millican as Ike Stapleton
- Bruce Cowling as Lieutenant Grimes
- Fritz Leiber as Mr. Poole
- Harry Tenbrook as Townsman (uncredited)

== Reception ==
According to MGM records, the film earned $1,349,000 in the U.S. and Canada and $747,000 overseas, resulting in a profit of $25,000.

=== Critical response ===
Bosley Crowther called the movie a "whopping action film". He notes "Devil's Doorway, like the Twentieth Century-Fox picture of a few months back, Broken Arrow, is a Western with a point of view that rattles some skeletons in our family closet. Robert Taylor may strike you as a rather peculiar choice to play a full-blooded Indian, but give the man credit for a forceful performance. Indeed, his is the only role that is not a stereotype. However, the other players give good performances even though they represent characters that are as much a part of the Western film formula as horses and sagebrush."
