= Stanley Roberts (screenwriter) =

American screenwriter

Stanley Roberts (1916 – 1982) was an American screenwriter.

He was nominated for an Academy Award for the film The Caine Mutiny in the category of Best Adapted Screenplay. He also wrote the screenplay for the screen adaptation of Death of Salesman.

== Filmography ==
- Young Dynamite (1937)
