= Broken Arrow (1950 film) =

1950 film by Delmer Daves

- Theatrical release poster
- Directed by: Delmer Daves
- Screenplay by: Albert Maltz
- Based on: Blood Brother by Elliott Arnold
- Produced by: Julian Blaustein
- Starring: James Stewart; Jeff Chandler; Debra Paget; Basil Ruysdael; Will Geer; Arthur Hunnicutt
- Cinematography: Ernest Palmer
- Edited by: J. Watson Webb Jr.
- Music by: Hugo Friedhofer
- Color process: Technicolor
- Production company: 20th Century Fox
- Distributed by: 20th Century Fox
- Release date: July 20, 1950
- Running time: 93 minutes
- Country: United States
- Language: English
- Box office: $3.6 million (US rentals)

Broken Arrow is a 1950 American independent revisionist Western drama film directed by Delmer Daves and starring James Stewart, Jeff Chandler and Debra Paget. The film is based on historical figures but fictionalizes their story in dramatized form. It was nominated for three Academy Awards and won a Golden Globe Award for Best Film Promoting International Understanding. Film historians have said that the film was one of the first major Westerns to portray Native American sympathetically.

== Plot ==
Tom Jeffords finds a wounded 14-year-old Apache boy dying from buckshot wounds in his back. The boy tries to attack him, but Jeffords gives him water and treats his wounds, staying with him until he heals. The boy's tribesmen appear and are initially hostile but free Jeffords after the boy convinces them that he is a good man who helped him. However, when a group of gold prospectors approaches, the Apaches gag Jeffords and tie him to a tree. He watches helplessly as they attack the prospectors and torture the survivors. The warriors warn him not to enter Apache territory again.

When Jeffords returns to Tucson, he encounters a prospector who escaped the ambush. He corrects a man's exaggerated account of the attack, but Ben Slade does not understand why Jeffords did not kill the Apache boy.

Jeffords declines the army's request to scout Apache territory and instead learns the Apache language and customs from an Indian guide who lives among the townspeople. He plans to approach the Apache leader Cochise's stronghold on behalf of his friend Milt, who is in charge of the mail service in Tucson. The mail has not been reaching its destinations because of Apache raids, and Jeffords believes that the discussion may be a starting point for a peace treaty. He enters the Apache stronghold and talks with Cochise, who agrees to let the mail couriers through. The men realize that their underlying morality is similar, and Cochise is impressed with Jeffords' bravery and willingness to learn his language. Jeffords meets and falls in love with a young Apache woman named Sonseeahray.

Despite the agreement, Apaches attack an army wagon train and kill the survivors. The townsfolk try to lynch Jeffords as a traitor for working with their enemies before he is saved by principled general Oliver Otis Howard, who recruits him to negotiate a wider peace treaty with Cochise. They devise a peace treaty, but a group led by Geronimo oppose it and leave the stronghold. When the renegades ambush a stagecoach, Jeffords seeks help from Cochise, and the stagecoach is saved with the Apaches' help.

Jeffords and Sonseeahray marry in an Apache ceremony. Slade's son visits Jeffords and Cochise to inform them about two of his horses stolen by Cochise's people. Cochise doubts his story, as he knows that Slade hates the Apaches. They accompany the boy up the canyon and are ambushed by Slade and a gang of men from Tucson. Jeffords is shot and badly wounded and Sonseeahray is shot and killed, but Cochise kills most of the men, including Slade. Cochise forbids Jeffords to retaliate, arguing that peace must be maintained. General Howard arrives with some of the townsfolk and informs Jeffords and Cochise that the men who survived the ambush and fled have been captured and will be executed for their crime. The townsfolk offer their condolences and apologize.

Jeffords rides off with the belief that the death of Sonseeahray ensured a lasting peace and that she will always be with him.

== Cast ==
- James Stewart as Tom Jeffords
- Jeff Chandler as Cochise
- Debra Paget as Sonseeahray
- Basil Ruysdael as Gen. Oliver Howard
- Will Geer as Ben Slade
- Joyce MacKenzie as Terry
- Arthur Hunnicutt as Milt Duffield
- Jay Silverheels as Geronimo
- Juila Vajivio as Girl on Horse (uncredited)

== Production ==
Producer Julian Blaustein recalled: "We had a terrible time locating an actor with the proper voice and stature to play Cochise. Before we found Chandler we were even considering Ezio Pinza".

Jeff Chandler was cast in May 1949 on the basis of his performance in Sword in the Desert. He was working in several radio series at the time, Michael Shayne and Our Miss Brooks, which he left for several weeks.

Filming started on June 6, 1949. It was primarily shot on location in northern Arizona, approximately 30 miles south of Flagstaff. Apaches from the Whiteriver agency on the Fort Apache Indian Reservation played themselves. Debra Paget was only 16 years old when she played the love interest to 42-year-old James Stewart. Canadian Mohawk actor Jay Silverheels portrayed Geronimo.

The film is based on the 558-page novel Blood Brother (1947) by Elliott Arnold.

Although many Western films of the pre-World War II period portray American Indians as unwaveringly hostile to the mostly European-American settlers, others showed them in a more positive light. Broken Arrow is noteworthy as one of the first post-war Westerns to present a more balanced portrayal of Indians, helping to bring the era of the revisionist Western genre.

== Reception ==
Broken Arrow was screened for 450 civic leaders at the Museum of Modern Art in New York on July 13, 1950. The president of the Association on American Indian Affairs addressed the crowd to decry Hollywood's traditional portrayal of Indians and condemn the recent 14-year prison sentence given to four Nez Perce and Coeur d'Alene boys in Idaho for the theft of a sheep.

In a contemporary review for The New York Times, critic Bosley Crowther wrote:

In what appears an honorable endeavor to clear the public's mind of the traditional notion that the American Indian was an unprincipled and uncivilized brute, Twentieth Century-Fox has manufactured a richly colorful romantic film, "Broken Arrow," in which the Indians come off better—much better—on the whole, than do the whites. As a matter of fact, one might wonder ... whether it isn't the white man, not the Indian, who should be regarded as "good" only when he is dead. ... We wish we could tell you unreservedly that the thesis is eloquently conveyed and that this picture demonstrates with real conviction that the Indian has been cruelly maligned. But unfortunately the nobleness of purpose of Twentieth Century-Fox is more to be commended than the talent with which it has made this film. ... [A]pparently in his enthusiasm to treat the Indian with politeness and respect, Delmer Daves, the director, brought forth red men who act like denizens of the musical comedy stage. ... No, we cannot accept this picture as either an exciting or reasonable account of the attitudes and ways of American Indians. They merit justice, but not such patronage."

== Adaptation ==
Lux Radio Theatre presented a one-hour adaptation of Broken Arrow on January 22, 1951, with Stewart, Paget, and Chandler reprising their roles from the film.

== Awards and nominations ==
Award	Category	Nominee(s)	Result	Ref.
Academy Awards	Best Supporting Actor	Jeff Chandler	Nominated	
Academy Awards	Best Screenplay	Albert Maltz (Note: Originally Michael Blankfort had been listed for this nomination. Blankfort fronted for Maltz, who was a blacklisted writer at the time. Following research by the Writers Guild of America West in July 1991, the Academy of Motion Picture Arts and Sciences officially attributed the nomination to Maltz and removed Blankford.)	Nominated	
Academy Awards	Best Cinematography – Color	Ernest Palmer	Nominated	
Golden Globe Awards	Best Cinematography – Color	Ernest Palmer	Nominated	
Golden Globe Awards	Best Promoting International Understanding	Delmer Daves	Won	
Picturegoer Awards	Best Actor	Jeff Chandler	Nominated	
Writers Guild of America Awards	Best Written Film Concerning Problems with the American Scene	Albert Maltz (Note: Maltz was not named on the nominations due to being blacklisted, Michael Blankfort was listed instead.)	Nominated	
Writers Guild of America Awards	Best Written American Western	Albert Maltz	Won	

The film was nominated by the American Film Institute for inclusion in the 2008 AFI's 10 Top 10 list of Western films.

== See also ==
- Broken Arrow, an accidental event that involves nuclear weapons
  - Broken Arrow (1996 film), depicting such an incident
- List of American films of 1950

== Notes ==
- Aleiss, Angela, Making the White Man's Indian: Native Americans and Hollywood Movies, London & CT: Praeger, 2005; ISBN 0-275-98396-X
- Karney, Robyn (editor), Chronicle of the Cinema; London: Dorling Kindersley, 1995; ISBN 0-7894-0123-1
- Lenihan, John H. Showdown: Confronting Modern America in the Western Film, Urbana: University of Illinois Press, 1980; ISBN 0-252-00769-7
- O'Conner, John E. & Peter C. Rollins, eds. Hollywood's Indian: The Portrayal of the Native American in Film [Paperback], The University Press of Kentucky, 2003; ISBN 0813190770
