= Albert Maltz =

American writer (1908–1985)

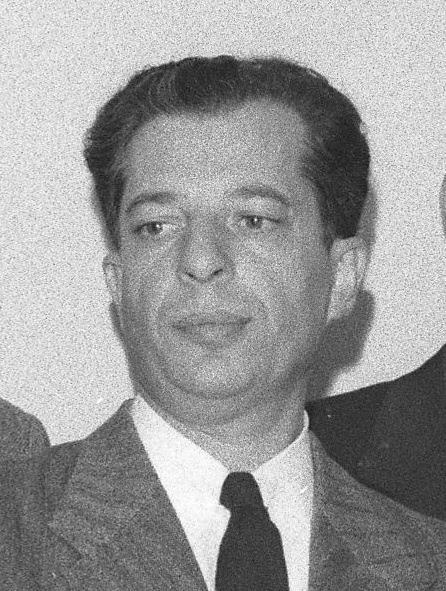
- Maltz in 1947
- Born: October 28, 1908; New York City, U.S.
- Died: April 26, 1985 (aged 76); Los Angeles, California, U.S.
- Education: Columbia University (BA); Yale University (MFA)
- Occupations: Fiction writer; screenwriter
- Spouses: Margaret Larkin (m. 1937; div. 1964) Rosemary Wylde (m. 1964; died 1968) Esther Engelberg (m. 1970)
- Writing career
- Notable awards: O. Henry Award (1938, 1941)

Albert Maltz (/mɔːlts/; October 28, 1908 – April 26, 1985) was an American playwright, fiction writer and screenwriter. He was one of the Hollywood Ten who were jailed in 1950 for their 1947 refusal to testify before the US Congress about their involvement with the Communist Party USA. They and many other US entertainment industry figures were subsequently blacklisted, which denied Maltz employment in the industry for many years.

== Background ==
Albert Maltz was the third of three sons born to Bernard Morris Maltz, a Russian immigrant from modern-day Lithuania, and Lena Schereaschetsky (later Sherry), also an immigrant from a Russia-controlled area. Born into an affluent Jewish family, in Brooklyn, New York, Maltz was educated at Columbia University, where he was a member of Zeta Beta Tau fraternity and the class of 1930, and the Yale School of Drama. He became a communist in 1935, out of conviction, later telling an interviewer: "I also read the Marxist classics. I still think it to be the noblest set of ideals ever penned by man ... Where else in political literature do you find thinkers saying that we were going to end all forms of human exploitation? Wage exploitation, exploitation of women by men, the exploitation of people of colour by white peoples, the exploitation of colonial countries by imperialist countries. And Marx spoke of the fact that socialism will be the kingdom of freedom, where man realizes himself in a way that humankind has never seen before. This was an inspiring body of literature to read." Although Maltz later learned of and criticized Soviet repression, one 2009 analysis maintains, "he remained sympathetic to the anti-fascism of both the Soviet Union and the CPUSA during the 1930s," saying in a 1983 interview "the Communist party in the United States was leading the educational and organizational struggle."

=== Ostracism within the CPUSA and recantation ===
In February 1946 Maltz published an article (written in October 1945) for The New Masses titled "What Shall We Ask of Writers?" in which he criticized fellow Communist writers for producing lower-quality work, owing to their placing political concerns above artistic ones. He also referred positively in his article to the work of James T. Farrell, a Trotskyist. This article brought upon Maltz venomous attacks from fellow CPUSA members, both in print and in person at party meetings. He was accused of "Browderism" and in order to retain his good standing with the party he had to humiliate himself by publishing in the Daily Worker a rebuttal of his own article. Furthermore, he "publicly denounced himself onstage at a writer's symposium chaired by party members."

Nearly 30 years after Maltz's death, the 'Albert Maltz Affair' still was a subject of discussion among scholars of Marxist movements and of the Hollywood Ten. John Sbardellati of the University of Waterloo argued in the journal Cold War History that "by reigning [sic] in Albert Maltz, the Party rejected its earlier, more accommodating approach to popular culture, and in doing so, unwittingly forfeited a large measure of its cultural influence" and that this shift contributed to the rapid decline of "social problem films" that had emerged early in the post-war era (p. 489). Writing in the Journal of American Studies, Colin Burnett argues, "The immediate attacks on Maltz by critics like Mike Gold were motivated primarily by the view that a properly Marxist aesthetics must follow the Leninist–Zhdanovite theory of 'art as a weapon'," though Burnett proposes "a reexamination of the 'para-Marxist' theory of art [Maltz] developed to clarify the role of leftist criticism and the 'citizen writer' ... in light of debates about art and literature in the journal New Masses (1926–48), as well as in international Marxist aesthetics."

== Career ==
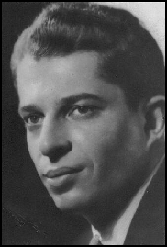
Albert Maltz

During the 1930s, Maltz worked as a playwright for the Theater Union, which was "an organization of theater artists and [pro-Communist] political activists who mounted professional productions of plays oriented towards working people and their middle-class allies." In 1932, his play Merry Go Round was adapted for a film. At the Theater Union he met Margaret Larkin (1899–1967), whom he married in 1937. He won the O. Henry Award twice: in 1938 for The Happiest Man on Earth, a short story published in Harper's Magazine, and in 1941 for Afternoon in the Jungle, published in The New Yorker. His collection of short fiction The Way Things Are, and Other Stories was published in 1938, as was his novella Seasons of Celebration, included in The Flying Yorkshireman and Other Novellas, a multi-author compilation released as a May 1938 Book of the Month Club selection. These writings and his 1940 novel The Underground Stream are considered works of proletarian literature. During this time, Maltz's play Private Hicks appeared in William Kozlenko's 1939 curated collection The Best Short Plays of the Social Theater, along with such plays as Clifford Odets' Waiting for Lefty, The Cradle Will Rock by Marc Blitzstein, and The Dog Beneath the Skin by W.H. Auden and Christopher Isherwood.

In 1944 he published the novel The Cross and the Arrow, about which Jerry Belcher noted that it was "a best seller chronicling German resistance to the Nazi regime. It was distributed in a special Armed Services Edition to more than 150,000 American fighting men during World War II." In 1970 he published a new collection of short stories Afternoon in the Jungle.

While still pursuing his career as a writer of published fiction and stage drama, he branched out into writing for the screen. Within three years he was nominated for an Academy Award for screenwriting and won one for documentary film and one special one. After working uncredited on Casablanca, Maltz's first screenwriting credit was for This Gun for Hire (1942), co-written with W. R. Burnett. For his script for the 1945 film Pride of the Marines, Maltz was nominated for an Academy Award for Writing Adapted Screenplay. During this period, he also received two Academy Awards for documentary or documentary-style films: the Academy Award for Best Documentary in 1942 for The Defeat of German Armies Near Moscow and a special Oscar in 1945 for The House I Live In, an 11-minute film with singer-actor Frank Sinatra opposing anti-Semitism through an incident of young bullies chasing a Jewish boy, prompting Sinatra to speak and sing about why such behavior is wrong.

In 1946, he co-wrote the screenplay for Cloak and Dagger (1946 film) with Ring Lardner, Jr. And he wrote the screenplay for the highly-praised The Naked City, released March 4, 1948, his last American screen credit for 22 years.

=== Blacklisting ===
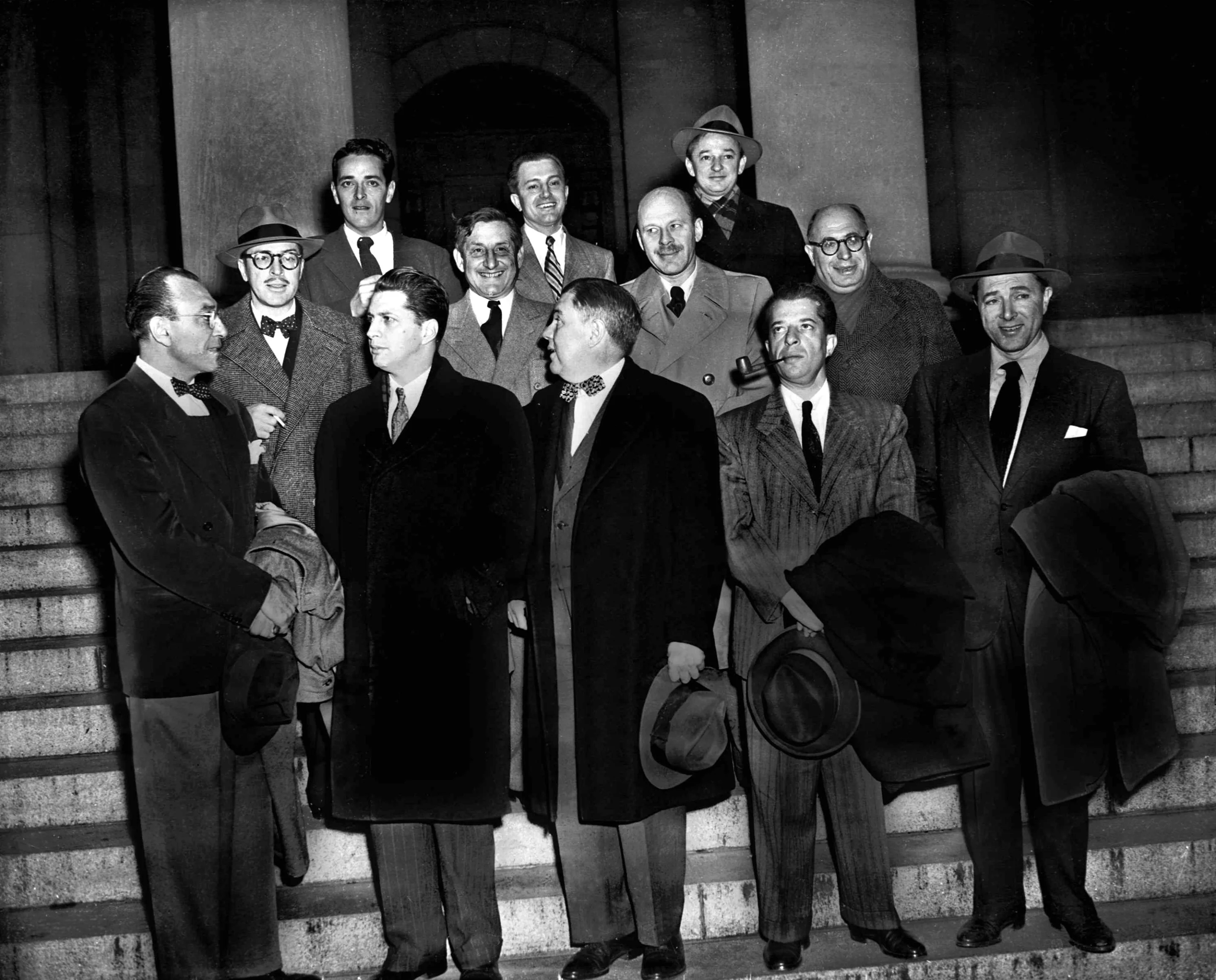
"The Hollywood Ten" stand with their attorneys outside district court in Washington, D.C. before arraignment on contempt of Congress charges. The ten were charged for refusing to cooperate with the House Un-American Activities Committee. (Front row, L-R): Herbert Biberman, attorney Martin Popper, attorney Robert W. Kenny, Albert Maltz and Lester Cole. (Second row, L-R): Dalton Trumbo, John Howard Lawson, Alvah Bessie and Samuel Ornitz. (Top row, L-R): Ring Lardner Jr., Edward Dmytryk and Adrian Scott.

In 1947 Maltz became one of the Hollywood Ten, who refused to answer questions before the House Un-American Activities Committee about their Communist Party membership. On the day that Maltz appeared before the committee, October 28, 1947, he and fellow writers Dalton Trumbo and Alvah Bessie not only refused to answer the committee's central question, but also "challenged the committee's constitutionality and berated its activities," according to a reporter for The Dallas Morning News Washington Bureau. For refusing to respond, each was cited for contempt by Congress, sentenced to jail and fined, although Maltz was the only one in the group whose citation was made the subject of a record vote (a decision in which each member's vote is recorded by name), approved 346 to 17; Trumbo's citation was part of a standing vote (votes counted but not individually named), 240 to 15, and the remaining eight were cited via voice vote. When the jail sentences and fines were finalized, June 29, 1950, "maximum sentences of a year in jail and $1,000 fine were imposed on Ring Lardner Jr., Lester Cole, Maltz, and Bessie", while Herbert Biberman and Edward Dmytryk received equal fines but six-month jail sentences; four additional members were set for later punishment.

Maltz was enraged at the questioning by the committee while Mississippi Democrat John E. Rankin was a member. After Rankin described the Ku Klux Klan as "an American institution" Maltz declared that he would "not be dictated to or intimidated by men to whom the Ku Klux Klan, as a matter of committee record, is an acceptable American institution".

Like the others, Maltz was blacklisted by studio executives, beginning with an announcement on November 27, 1947, from the president of the Motion Picture Association of America that fifty of the field's top executives had met for two days and decided to drop all ten men from their payrolls, to hire "no known Communists" in future, and to refuse to rehire any of the blacklisted men "until he is acquitted or has purged himself of contempt and declared under oath that he is not a Communist." Work that debuted between the 1947 citation and 1950 assignment of sentence received some attention—almost exactly one year after his contempt citation, a Film Daily critics' poll named his The Naked City one of the top five screenplays of the 1947–48 season— but once jailed and fined, Maltz struggled to get work or credit. His screenplay for Broken Arrow won the 1951 Writers Guild of America Award for Best Written American Western. However, due to his blacklisting at the time, fellow MPAA screenwriter Michael Blankfort agreed to put his own name on the script in place of Maltz's as the only way to get it accepted by any of the Hollywood movie studios, and as such, Blankfort was named the winner. His last assignment for some years was The Robe (1953), although he didn't receive a credit until decades later.

During the early years of the blacklisting, Maltz continued as a published writer of fiction. A 1949 Frank X. Tolbert review of Maltz's The Journey of Simon McKeever notes that the author's notoriety likely will lead the book to be "read keenly and even X-rayed to see if it might furnish a clue to the question the writer wouldn't answer." Praising the novel as a "beautiful" novel and "an eloquent criticism of the way we treat our old people" in the form of a "stream of consciousness story about a few days in the life of a 73-year-old arthritic in a rest home on a $60 pension," a man who "has made good wages all his life" but is "too generous to have saved any money," living in an old-age home Tolbert describes as "like something Charles Dickens would have cooked up if he were a twentieth-century author"—Tolbert concludes that "if [this book] is 'un-American' in its philosophy, then so are the doctrines of old Doc Townsend and most of the other pension planners."

In 1960, years after appearing in The House I Live In, Sinatra engaged him to write a screenplay for The Execution of Private Slovik. The decision led to considerable public pressure on Sinatra, including an incident in which popular conservative actor John Wayne publicly challenged presidential hopeful John F. Kennedy, then a senator for Massachusetts, as to whether he approved of his "crony" Sinatra's choice, stating that Kennedy's opinion mattered "because Mr. Kennedy is the one who is making plans to run the administrative government of our country." In the same article, Ward Bond disparaged Sinatra and others who employed blacklisted writers as "members of the recent trend of what might be called a 'Hire the Commies' Club." Sinatra initially parried attempts to persuade him to fire Maltz, stating that the writer was hired "because he was the best man for the job—it had nothing to do with his politics", but in the end Sinatra was pressured into dismissing Maltz from the project, with columnist Dorothy Kilgallen crediting chiefly the intervention of Kennedy's father, Joe—"unquestionably anti-Communist, Dad Kennedy would have invited Frank to jump off the Jack Kennedy presidential bandwagon if he hadn't unloaded Maltz"— although she also noted that Col. Parker "was on the verge of pulling Elvis off the upcoming Sinatra spectacular if there was any chance of guilt by association."

Maltz and other members of the Hollywood Ten attempted again in 1960 to fight the blacklist, this time by filing an anti-trust suit claiming the studios had conspired illicitly in restraint of trade by enforcing the unofficial blacklist through mutual pressure not to employ the affected creative personnel. Coverage of the suit noted that the plaintiffs "include three winners of Oscars, the highest artistic award of the movie industry"—at least two of which were won for pseudonymous writing (The Defiant Ones and Inherit the Wind are named)—and that while use of the anti-trust laws for civil rights suits was "unusual," it was "not unique."

== Post-blacklist career and credits ==
Maltz was finally employed again on Two Mules for Sister Sara (1970), which was a vehicle for the popular actors Clint Eastwood and Shirley MacLaine. He worked on additional screenwriting projects in his later years, not all of which came to fruition; a 1972 article on Martin Rackin notes his intention to film a Modigliani biography he co-wrote with Maltz, while a 1978 Henry Fonda profile indicates his plans to revive a script of Maltz's The Journey of Simon McKeever, previously set to star Walter Huston but shelved due to the blacklist, then revived for Spencer Tracy but abandoned when the star died before shooting began. Fonda said in a separate interview, "When it was brought to me, I fell in love with the story. Jane heard me talking enthusiastically about it, and she asked to read the script. 'Dad, I'd like to play the doctor'... you know she must like it, because her role is small—she'll work only four days." Although the project at that time had advanced to the point that filming locations convenient to Henry Fonda's beekeeping hobby had been identified, the film never was made. Maltz's last writing credit (as John B. Sherry) is for Hangup (1974).

In 1991, in the course of correcting screen credits for blacklisted screenwriters, the Writers Guild of America officially recognized Maltz as the only credited screenwriter for Broken Arrow. The guild's vote was unanimous.

One of Maltz's literary agents was Maxim Lieber, whom he visited in Warsaw, Poland, after Lieber fled the States in 1950. Maltz referred to him as "my friend and former agent." In his later years, Maltz reached out to others outside the United States, once offering to take any royalties owed him by the Soviet Union and give them to Russian writer Aleksandr Solzhenitsyn to alleviate the dire conditions then being imposed on him by the USSR. Solzhenitsyn expressed his appreciation via the press, observing that Soviet authorities were unlikely to allow him to accept the offer and disputing Soviet cultural minister Furtseva's claims that the Russian author was "well off and has bought more than one car," insisting instead that for the seven years previous the Soviet government had denied him both money and housing, such that, "My only car, which I had been using for nine years, was sold to prolong my existence and I have not gotten any other car."

Maltz died April 26, 1985, at the age of 76 from complications from a stroke he had had nine months before. In an interview given a few weeks after Maltz's death, actor Kirk Douglas—who claimed to have broken the blacklist by publicly hiring Trumbo in 1959 to improve the Spartacus script—said of the 10, "I felt badly about those people. They weren't trying to overthrow their government. I didn't share their beliefs, any more than I am in sympathy with the opinions of Vanessa Redgrave. But I support her suit against the Boston Symphony [for cancelling 1982 performances based on Redgrave's support of the Palestine Liberation Organization]. That's a blacklist."

== Depiction ==
In Jay Roach's Trumbo, Maltz is part of a composite character, Arlen Hird (Louis C.K.).

== Works ==
=== Plays ===
- Merry-Go-Round (1932)
- Peace on Earth (1934)
- Black Pit (1935)
- Private Hicks (1936)
- Rehearsal (1938)
- The Morrison Case (1952) (A Morrison-ügy, 1966)

=== Short story collections ===
- The Way Things Are (1938)
- Afternoon in the Jungle (1971)

=== Novels ===
- The Underground Stream (1940)
- The Cross and the Arrow (1944)
- The Journey of Simon McKeever (1949)
- A Long Day in Short Life (1957)
- A Tale of One January (1966)

=== Essays ===
- The Citizen Writer (1950)

=== Filmography ===
This filmography is based on the Internet Movie Database listings.

- This Gun for Hire (1942)
- Destination Tokyo (1943)
- The House I Live In (1945)
- Pride of the Marines (1945)
- Cloak and Dagger (1946)
- The Red House (1947)(originally uncredited)
- The Naked City (1948)
- Broken Arrow (1950) (originally uncredited)
- The Robe (1953) (originally uncredited)
- Moneta (The Coin) (1962) (USSR)
- Two Mules for Sister Sara (1970)
- The Beguiled (1971) (as John B. Sherry)
- Scalawag (1973)
- Hangup (1974) (as John B. Sherry)

=== Short fiction ===
Title	Publication	Collected in
"Man on a Road"	New Masses (January 8, 1935)	The Way Things Are
"The Game"	Scribner's Magazine (December 1936)	The Way Things Are
"Good-by"	New Masses (December 15, 1936)	The Way Things Are
"A Letter from the Country"	New Masses (August 17, 1937)	The Way Things Are
"Season of Celebration" aka "Hotel Raleigh, the Bowery"	Story (September 1937)	The Way Things Are
"Incident on a Street Corner"	The New Yorker (November 27, 1937)	The Way Things Are
"The Happiest Man on Earth"	Harper's Magazine (June 1938)	Afternoon in the Jungle
"The Drop-Forge Man"	The Way Things Are (July 1938)	The Way Things Are
"The Way Things Are"	The Way Things Are (July 1938)	The Way Things Are
"Sunday Morning on Twentieth Street"	The Southern Review (Winter 1940)	Afternoon in the Jungle
"Afternoon in the Jungle"	The New Yorker (January 11, 1941)	Afternoon in the Jungle
"Circus Come to Town"	Masses & Mainstream (July 1950)	Afternoon in the Jungle
"With Laughter"	The Southwest Review (Spring 1960, under the name Julian Silva)	Afternoon in the Jungle
"The Farmer's Dog" aka "The Prisoner's Dog"	The Saturday Evening Post (July 13, 1968)	Afternoon in the Jungle
"The Spoils of War"	The Saturday Evening Post (October 5, 1968)	-
"The Cop"	Afternoon in the Jungle (1970)	Afternoon in the Jungle

== See also ==
- List of Russian Academy Award winners and nominees
