= Writers Guild of America Award for Best Written Musical =

United States award (1949-1969)

- Awarded for: Outstanding Writing for a Musical Film
- Country: United States
- Presented by: Writers Guild of America
- First award: 1949
- Final award: 1969
- Website: http://www.wga.org/

The Writers Guild Award for Best Written Musical was an award presented from 1949 to 1969 by the Writers Guild of America, after which it was discontinued.

== Winners & Nominees ==
=== Notes ===
- The year indicates when the film was released. The awards were presented the following year.

=== 1940s ===
Year	Film	Writer(s)
1948 (1st)	Easter Parade	Sidney Sheldon, Frances Goodrich, and Albert Hackett
1948 (1st)	Luxury Liner	Gladys Lehman, and Richard Connell
1948 (1st)	On an Island with You	Dorothy Kingsley, Dorothy Cooper, Charles Martin, and Hans Wilhelm
1948 (1st)	That Lady in Ermine	Samson Raphaelson
1948 (1st)	The Emperor Waltz	Charles Brackett, and Billy Wilder
1948 (1st)	When My Baby Smiles at Me	Lamar Trotti
1948 (1st)	You Were Meant for Me	Elick Moll, and Valentine Davies
1949 (2nd)	On the Town	Adolph Green & Betty Comden
1949 (2nd)	In the Good Old Summertime	Albert Hackett, Frances Goodrich, and Ivan Tors
1949 (2nd)	Jolson Sings Again	Sidney Buchman
1949 (2nd)	Take Me Out to the Ball Game	Harry Tugend, and George Wells
1949 (2nd)	The Barkleys of Broadway	Betty Comden, and Adolph Green
1949 (2nd)	You're My Eve	Lamar Trotti

=== 1950s ===
Year	Film	Writer(s)
1950 (3rd)	Annie Get Your Gun	Sidney Sheldon
1950 (3rd)	My Blue Heaven	Lamar Trotti, and Claude Binyon
1950 (3rd)	Summer Stock	George Wells, and Sy Gomberg
1950 (3rd)	The West Point Story	John Monks Jr., Charles Hoffman, and Irving Wallace
1950 (3rd)	Three Little Words	George Wells
1951 (4th)	An American in Paris	Alan Jay Lerner
1951 (4th)	Here Comes the Groom	Virginia Van Upp, Liam O'Brien, and Myles Connolly
1951 (4th)	On the Riviera	Valentine Davies, Phoebe Ephron, and Henry Ephron
1951 (4th)	Show Boat	John Lee Mahim
1951 (4th)	The Great Caruso	Sonya Levien, and William Ludwig
1952 (5th)	Singin' in the Rain	Betty Comden, and Adolph Green
1952 (5th)	Hans Christian Andersen	Moss Hart
1952 (5th)	I'll See You in My Dreams!	Jack Rose, and Melville Shavelson
1952 (5th)	Where's Charley	John Monks Jr.
1952 (5th)	With a Song in My Heart	Lamar Trotti
1953 (6th)	Lili	Helen Deutsch
1953 (6th)	Call Me Madam	Arthur Sheekman
1953 (6th)	Gentlemen Prefer Blondes	Charles Lederer
1953 (6th)	Kiss Me Kate	Dorothy Kingsley
1953 (6th)	The Band Wagon	Bett Comden, and Adolph Green
1954 (7th)	Seven Brides for Seven Brothers	Albert Hackett, Frances Goodrich, and Dorothy Kingsley
1954 (7th)	A Star Is Born	Moss Hart
1954 (7th)	Carmen Jones	Harry Kleiner
1954 (7th)	The Glenn Miller Story	Valentine Davies, and Oscar Brodney
1954 (7th)	There's No Business Like Show Business	Phoebe Ephron, and Henry Ephron
1955 (8th)	Love Me or Leave Me	Daniel Fuchs, and Isobel Lennart
1955 (8th)	Daddy long Legs	Phoebe Ephron, and Henry Ephron
1955 (8th)	Guys and Dolls	Joseph L. Mankiewicz
1955 (8th)	It's Always Fair Weather	Betty Comden, and Adolph Green
1955 (8th)	Oklahoma!	Sonya Levien, and William Ludwig
1956 (9th)	The King and I	Ernest Lehman
1956 (9th)	Carousel	Phoebe Ephron, and Henry Ephron
1956 (9th)	High Society	John Patrick
1956 (9th)	Meet Me in Las Vegas	Isobel Lennart
1956 (9th)	The Eddy Duchin Story	Samuel A. Taylor
1957 (10th)	Les Girls	John Patrick
1957 (10th)	Funny Face	Leonard Gershe
1957 (10th)	Pal Joey	Dorothy Kingsley
1957 (10th)	The Joker Is Wild	Oscar Saul
1957 (10th)	The Pajama Game	George Abbott, and Richard Bissell
1958 (11th)	Gigi	Alan Jay Lerner
1958 (11th)	Damn Yankees	George Abbott
1958 (11th)	South Pacific	Paul Osborn
1958 (11th)	The Girl Most Likely	Paul Jarrico, and Devery Freeman
1958 (11th)	Tom Thumb	Ladislas Fodor
1959 (12th)	The Five Pennies	Melville Shavelson, and Jack Rose
1959 (12th)	A Private's Affair	Winston Miller
1959 (12th)	Li'l Abner	Norman Panama, and Melvin Frank
1959 (12th)	Never Steal Anything Small	Charles Lederer
1959 (12th)	Porgy and Bess	N. Richard Nash
1959 (12th)	Say One for Me	Robert O'Brien

=== 1960s ===
Year	Film	Writer(s)
1960 (13th)	Bells Are Ringing	Betty Comden, and Adolph Green
1960 (13th)	Can-Can	Dorothy Kingsley, and Charles Lederer
1960 (13th)	G.I. Blues	Edmund Beloin, and Henry Garson
1960 (13th)	Let's Make Love	Norman Krasna, and Hal Kanter
1961 (14th)	West Side Story	Ernest Lehman
1961 (14th)	Babes in Toyland	Ward Kimball, and Lowell S. Hawley
1961 (14th)	Blue Hawaii	Hal Kanter
1961 (14th)	Flower Drum Song	Joseph Fields
1961 (14th)	Snow White and the Three Stooges	Noel Langley, and Elwood Ullman
1962 (15th)	The Music Man	Marion Hargrove
1962 (15th)	Billy Rose's Jumbo	Sidney Sheldon
1962 (15th)	Gypsy	Leoanard Spigelgass
1962 (15th)	Hey, Let's Twist!	Hal Hackady
1962 (15th)	State Fair	Richard L. Breen
1963 (16th)	Not Awarded	
1964 (17th)	Mary Poppins	Bill Walsh, and Don DaGradi
1964 (17th)	Kissin' Cousins	Gerarld Drayson Adams, and Gene Nelson
1964 (17th)	My Fair Lady	Alan Jay Lerner
1964 (17th)	Robin and the 7 Hoods	David R. Schwartz
1964 (17th)	Roustabout	Anthony Lawrence, and Allan Weiss
1964 (17th)	The Unsinkable Molly Brown	Helen Deutsch
1965 (18th)	The Sound of Music	Ernest Lehman
1966 (19th)	Not Awarded	
1967 (20th)	Thoroughly Modern Millie	Richard Morris
1967 (20th)	Camelot	Alan Jay Lerner
1967 (20th)	Doctor Dolittle	Leslie Bricusse
1967 (20th)	How to Succeed in Business Without Really Trying	David Swift
1968 (21st)	Funny Girl	Isobel Lennart
1968 (21st)	Finian's Rainbow	E. Y. Harburg, and Fred Saidy
1968 (21st)	Star!	William Fairchild
