= 12th Writers Guild of America Awards =

12th WGA Awards
- Date: 1960
- Organized by: Writers Guild of America, East and the Writers Guild of America, West

The 12th Writers Guild of America Awards honored the best film writers and television writers of 1959. Winners were announced in 1960.

== Winners and nominees ==
=== Film ===
Winners are listed first highlighted in boldface.

**Best Written Musical**: **The Five Pennies, Screenplay by Melville Shavelson and Jack Rose; Story by Robert Smith**; A Private's Affair, Screenplay by Winston Miller; Story by Ray Livingston Murphy; Li'l Abner, Screenplay by Norman Panama and Melvin Frank; Based on the comic strip by Al Capp; Never Steal Anything Small, Screenplay by Charles Lederer; Based on the play by Maxwell Anderson and Rouben Mamoulian; Porgy and Bess, Screenplay by N. Richard Nash; Say One for Me, Screenplay by Robert O'Brien	**Best Written American Drama**: **The Diary of Anne Frank, Screenplay by Frances Goodrich and Albert Hackett; Based on the book The Diary of a Young Girl by Anne Frank**; Anatomy of a Murder, Screenplay by Wendell Mayes; Based on the novel by John D. Voelker; Ben-Hur, Screenplay by Karl Tunberg; Based on the novel by Lew Wallace; Compulsion, Screenplay by Richard Murphy; Based on the novel by Richard Murphy; The Nun's Story, Screenplay by Robert Anderson; Based on the book by Kathryn Hulme
**Best Written American Comedy**: **Some Like It Hot, Screenplay by Billy Wilder and I.A.L. Diamond; Story by Robert Thoeren and Michael Logan**; A Hole in the Head, Screenplay by Arnold Schulman; Based on the play; North by Northwest, Screenplay by Ernest Lehman; Operation Petticoat, Screenplay by Stanley Shapiro and Maurice Richlin; Story by Paul King and Joseph Stone; Pillow Talk, Screenplay by Stanley Shapiro and Maurice Richlin; Story by Russell Rouse and Clarence Greene	

=== Television ===
**Comedy/Variety, Any Length**: **"Freddie's Thanskgiving" - The Red Skelton Hour - Sherwood Schwartz, Jesse Goldstein and Dave O'Brien**; "The Dean Martin Show" - Startime - Herbert Baker; "The Ricardos Make Room for Danny" - The Lucy-Desi Comedy Hour - Bob Schiller and Bob Weiskopf; The Steve Allen Show - Don Hinkley, Herbert Sargent, Leonard Stern, Bill Dana and Stan Burns	**Script, 30 Minutes or Less in Program Length**: **"Auf Wiedersehen" - General Electric Theater - Kurt Vonnegut Jr. and Valentine Davies**; "Eddie" - Alcoa Theatre - Alfred Benner and Ken Hughes; "Kathy's Romance" - Father Knows Best - Roswell Rogers; "A Friend in Need" - Father Knows Best - Dorothy Cooper; "Day of Glory" - Jane Wyman Presents: The Fireside Theatre - Steve Fisher, Oscar Millard and Louis Aadamic; "A Locket for Linda" - Make Room for Daddy - Peggy Chantler Dick and William Cowley; "Terry's Crush" - Make Room for Daddy - Charles Stewart and Jack Elinson; "The Sheridan Story" - The Rifleman - Cyril Hume
**Script 60 Minutes or Less in Program Length but Longer Than 30 Minutes**: **"The Sea Is Boiling Hot" - Kraft Theatre - Shimon Wincelberg**; "The Nightingale" - Shirley Temple's Storybook - Alvin Sapinsley; "The Desperate Age" - Studio One in Hollywood - Abby Mann; "Capital Punishment" - Studio One in Hollywood - James Lee; "My Father, the Fool" - Westinghouse Desilu Playhouse - Adrian Spies

=== Special awards ===
Laurel Award for Screenwriting Achievement

**Norman Krasna**
