= 9th Writers Guild of America Awards =

9th WGA Awards
- Date: 1957
- Organized by: Writers Guild of America, East and the Writers Guild of America, West

The 9th Writers Guild of America Awards honored the best film writers and television writers of 1956. Winners were announced in 1957.

== Winners and nominees ==
=== Film ===
Winners are listed first highlighted in boldface.

**Best Written Musical**: **The King and I, Screenplay by Ernest Lehman; based on the book by Oscar Hammestein II**; Carousel, Screenplay by Phoebe Ephron, and Henry Ephron; based on the book by Oscar Hammerstein II; High Society, Screenplay by John Patrick; based on the play by Philip Barry; Meet Me in Las Vegas, Screenplay by Isobel Lennart; The Eddy Duchin Story, Screenplay by Samuel A. Taylor; story by Leo Katcher	**Best Written Drama**: **Friendly Persuasion, Screenplay by Michael Wilson; based on the novel by Jessamyn West**; Baby Doll, Screenplay by Tennessee Williams; Giant, Screenplay by Fred Guiol, and Ivan Moffat; based on the novel by Edna Ferber; Somebody Up There Likes Me, Screenplay by Ernest Lehman; based on the autobiography of Rocky Graziano; The Rainmaker, Screenplay by N. Richard Nash; based on the play by N. Richard Nash
**Best Written Comedy**: **Around the World in 80 Days, Screenplay by James Poe, John Farrow, and S. J. Perelman; based on the novel by Jules Verne**; Bus Stop, Screenplay by George Axelrod; based on the play by William Inge; Full of Life, Screenplay by John Fante; based on the novel by John Fante; The Solid Gold Cadillac, Screenplay by Abe Burrows; based on the play by George S. Kaufman, and Howard Teichmann; The Teahouse of the August Moon, Screenplay by John Patrick; based on the novel by Vern J. Sneider and the play by John Patrick	

=== Television ===
**Anthology Drama, 30 Minutes in Length**: **Telephone Time (Episode: The Golden Junkman), Written by Donald S. Sanford; story by John Nesbitt**; Alfred Hitchcock Presents (Episode: Back for Christmas), Teleplay by Francis M. Cockrell; story by John Collier; Frontier (Episode: The Salt War), Written by Morton S. Fine, and David Friedkin; Frontiers of Faith (Episode: Lawyer from Boston), Written by Morton Wishengrad; Schlitz Playhouse (Episode: The Bankmouse), Written by Lowell Barrington	**Drama, 60 Minutes or Longer in Length**: **Playhouse 90 (Episode: Requiem for a Heavyweight), Written by Rod Serling**; Climax! (Episode: The Fox), Written by Dale Wasserman; Conflict (Episode: Silent Journey), Written by Dean Riesner, and Roy Huggins; Lux Video (Episode: The Sentry), Written by John Gay; Studio One in Hollywood (Episode: Portrait of a Citizen), Written by Norman Katkov; Studio One in Hollywood (Episode: A Special Announcement), Written by David Aldrich; The United States Steel Hour (Episode: A Wind from the South), Written by James Costigan
**Episodic Drama, 30 Minutes in Length**: **Medic (Episode: She Walks in Beauty), Written by Ken Kolb**; Father Knows Best (Episode: The Great Guy), Written by Roswell Rogers; Gunsmoke (Episode: The Big Broad), Teleplay by David Victor, and Herbert Little Jr.; story by John Meston; Gunsmoke (Episode: The Guitar), Teleplay by Sam Peckinpah; story by John Meston; The Adventures of Rin Tin Tin (Episode: The White Buffalo), Written by Douglas Heyes	**Situational Comedy, 30 Minutes in Length**: **The Honeymooners (Episode: The $99,000 Answer), Written by Leonard Stern, and Sydney Zelinka**; Father Knows Best (Episode: The Spirit of Youth), Written by Dorothy Cooper; Private Secretary (Episode: Oh Brother!), Written by Phil Davis; Screen Directors Playhouse (Episode: The Carroll Formula), Written by John L. Greene; The Red Skelton Hour (Episode: The Cop and the Anthem), Teleplay by Sherwood Schwartz, and Jesse Goldstein

=== Special awards ===
Laurel Award for Screenwriting Achievement

**Billy Wilder, Charles Brackett**
