= 14th Writers Guild of America Awards =

14th WGA Awards
- Date: 1962
- Organized by: Writers Guild of America, East and the Writers Guild of America, West

The 14th Writers Guild of America Awards honored the best film writers and television writers of 1961. Winners were announced in 1962.

== Winners and nominees ==
=== Film ===
Winners are listed first highlighted in boldface.

**Best Written Musical**: **West Side Story, Screenplay by Ernest Lehman; Based on the book by Arthur Laurents & the play by Jerome Robbins**; Babes in Toyland, Screenplay by Ward Kimball and Lowell S. Hawley; Based on the operetta by Victor Herbert and Glen MacDonough; Blue Hawaii, Screenplay by Hal Kanter; Story by Allan Weiss; Flower Drum Song, Screenplay by Joseph Fields; Based on the novel by C.Y. Lee; Snow White and the Three Stooges, Screenplay by Noel Langley and Elwood Ullman; Story by Charles Wick	**Best Written American Drama**: **The Hustler, Screenplay by Sidney Carroll and Robert Rossen; Based on the novel by Walter Tevis**; A Raisin in the Sun, Written by Lorraine Hansberry; Fanny, Screenplay by Julius J. Epstein; Based on the play by S.N. Behrman and Joshua Logan; The Innocents, Screenplay by William Archibald and Truman Capote; Based on the story "The Turn of the Screw" by Henry James; Judgment at Nuremberg, Screenplay by Abby Mann; Story by Abby Mann
**Best Written American Comedy**: **Breakfast at Tiffany's, Screenplay by George Axelrod; Based on the breby Truman Capote**; A Majority of One, Written by Leonard Spigelgass; The Absent Minded Professor, Screenplay by Bill Walsh; Story by Samuel W. Taylor; One, Two, Three, Screenplay by Billy Wilder and I.A.L. Diamond; Based on the play by Ferenc Molnár; The Parent Trap, Screenplay by David Swift; Based on the book by Erich Kästner	

=== Television ===
**Episodic Drama**: **"The Fault in Our Stars" – Naked City (ABC) – Barry Trivers**; "The Fatalist" – Have Gun – Will Travel (CBS) – Shimon Wincelberg; "Incident of the Buffalo Soldier" – Rawhide (CBS) – John Dunkel; "No Sale" – The Law and Mr. Jones (ABC) – Palmer Thompson; "Brown" – The Westerner (NBC) – Bruce Geller	**Anthology, Any Length**: **"Death of the Temple Bay" – The DuPont Show with June Allyson (CBS) – Christopher Knopf**; "The Hidden World" – Armstrong Circle Theatre (NBC) – Alvin Boretz; "Eye of the Beholder" – The Twilight Zone (CBS) – Rod Serling
**Comedy/Variety, Any Length**: **"The Manhunt" – The Andy Griffith Show (CBS) – Charles Stewart and Jack Elinson**; "Everybody's Doin' It" – Art Carney Special (NBC) – Herbert Sargent; The Arthur Murray Special for Bob Hope – Lester A. White, John Rapp, Mort Lachman, Bill Larkin, Charles Lee and Norman Sullivan

=== Special awards ===
Laurel Award for Screenwriting Achievement

**Philip Dunne**

Valentine Davies Award

**Mary C. McCall Jr.**
