= Writers Guild of America Award for Best Written Drama =

- Awarded for: Outstanding Writing for a Dramatic Film
- Country: United States
- Presented by: Writers Guild of America
- First award: 1949
- Final award: 1984
- Website: http://www.wga.org

The Writers Guild Award for Best Written Drama was an award presented from 1949 to 1984 by the Writers Guild of America, after which it was discontinued.

== Winners & Nominees ==
=== Notes ===
- The year indicates when the film was released. The awards were presented the following year.

=== 1940s ===
Year	Film	Writer(s)
1948 (1st)	The Snake Pit	Frank Partos and Millen Brand
1948 (1st)	All My Sons	Chester Erskine
1948 (1st)	Another Part of the Forest	Vladimir Pozner
1948 (1st)	Berlin Express	Harold Medford
1948 (1st)	Call Northside 777	Jerome Cady, and Jay Dratler
1948 (1st)	Command Decision	William R. Laidlaw, and George Froeschel
1948 (1st)	I Remember Mama	Dewitt Bodeen
1948 (1st)	Johnny Belinda	Irma von Cube, and Allen Vincent
1948 (1st)	Key Largo	Richard Brooks, and John Huston
1948 (1st)	Sorry, Wrong Number	Lucille Fletcher
1948 (1st)	The Naked City	Albert Maltz, and Malvin Wald
1948 (1st)	The Treasure of the Sierra Madre	John Huston
1949 (2nd)	All the King's Men	Robert Rossen
1949 (2nd)	Battleground	Robert Pirosh
1949 (2nd)	Champion	Carl Foreman
1949 (2nd)	Intruder in the Dust	Ben Maddow
1949 (2nd)	The Hasty Heast	Ranald MacDougall
1949 (2nd)	The Heiress	Ruth Goetz, and Augustus Goetz
1949 (2nd)	The Window	Mel Dinelli

=== 1950s ===
Year	Film	Writer(s)
1950 (3rd)	Sunset Boulevard	Charles Brackett, Billy Wilder, and D.M. Marshman Jr.
1950 (3rd)	All About Eve	Joseph L. Mankiewicz
1950 (3rd)	Panic in the Streets	Richard Murphy
1950 (3rd)	The Asphalt Jungle	Ben Maddow, and John Huston
1950 (3rd)	The Men	Carl Foreman
1951 (4th)	A Place in the Sun	Michael Wilson and Harry Brown
1951 (4th)	A Streetcar Named Desire	Tennessee Williams
1951 (4th)	Death of a Salesman	Stanley Roberts
1951 (4th)	Detective Story	Philip Yordan, and Robert Wyler
1951 (4th)	Fourteen Hours	John Paxton
1952 (5th)	High Noon	Carl Foreman
1952 (5th)	5 Fingers	Michael Wilson
1952 (5th)	Come Back, Little Sheba	Ketti Frings
1952 (5th)	Moulin Rouge	Anthony Veiller, and John Huston
1952 (5th)	The Bad and the Beautiful	Charles Schnee
1953 (6th)	From Here to Eternity	Daniel Taradash
1953 (6th)	Above and Beyond	Melvin Frank, Norman Panama, and Beirne Lay Jr.
1953 (6th)	Little Fugitive	Ray Ashley
1953 (6th)	Martin Luther	Allan Sloane, and Lothar Wolff
1953 (6th)	Shane	A. B. Guthrie Jr.
1954 (7th)	On the Waterfront	Budd Schulberg
1954 (7th)	Executive Suite	Ernest Lehman
1954 (7th)	Rear Window	John Michael Hayes
1954 (7th)	The Barefoot Contessa	Joseph L. Mankiewicz
1954 (7th)	The Country Girl	George Seaton
1955 (8th)	Marty	Paddy Chayefsky
1955 (8th)	Bad Day at Black Rock	Millard Kaufman
1955 (8th)	Blackboard Jungle	Richard Brooks
1955 (8th)	East of Eden	Paul Osborn
1955 (8th)	Picnic	Daniel Taradash
1956 (9th)	Friendly Persuasion	Michael Wilson
1956 (9th)	Baby Doll	Tennessee Williams
1956 (9th)	Giant	Fred Guiol, and Ivan Moffat
1956 (9th)	Somebody Up There Likes Me	Ernest Lehman
1956 (9th)	The Rainmaker	N. Richard Nash
1957 (10th)	12 Angry Men	Reginald Rose
1957 (10th)	Heaven Knows, Mr. Allison	John Lee Mahin, and John Huston
1957 (10th)	Paths of Glory	Stanley Kubrick, Calder Willingham, and Jim Thompson
1957 (10th)	Peyton Place	John Michael Hayes
1957 (10th)	Sayonara	Paul Osborn
1958 (11th)	The Defiant Ones	Harold Jacob Smith, and Nedrick Young
1958 (11th)	Cat on a Hot Tin Roof	Richard Brooks, and James Poe
1958 (11th)	I Want to Live!	Nelson Gidding, and Don Mankiewicz
1958 (11th)	Separate Tables	Terence Rattigan, and John Gay
1958 (11th)	The Long, Hot Summer	Irving Ravetch, and Harriet Frank Jr.
1959 (12th)	The Diary of Anne Frank	Frances Goodrich, and Albert Hackett
1959 (12th)	Anatomy of a Murder	Wendell Mayes
1959 (12th)	Ben-Hur	Karl Tunberg
1959 (12th)	Compulsion	Richard Murphy
1959 (12th)	The Nun's Story	Robert Anderson

=== 1960s ===
Year	Film	Writer(s)
1960 (13th)	Elmer Gantry	Richard Brooks
1960 (13th)	Sons and Lovers	Gavin Lambert, and T.E.B. Clarke
1960 (13th)	Psycho	Joseph Stefano
1960 (13th)	Spartacus	Dalton Trumbo
1960 (13th)	The Sundowners	Isobel Lennart
1961 (14th)	The Hustler	Sidney Carroll, and Robert Rossen
1961 (14th)	A Raisin in the Sun	Lorraine Hansberry
1961 (14th)	Fanny	Julius J. Epstein
1961 (14th)	Judgment at Nuremberg	Abby Mann
1961 (14th)	The Innocents	William Archibald, and Truman Capote
1962 (15th)	To Kill a Mockingbird	Horton Foote
1962 (15th)	Billy Budd	Peter Ustinov, and DeWitt Bodeen
1962 (15th)	Birdman of Alcatraz	Guy Trosper
1962 (15th)	Freud	Charles Kaufman, and Wolfgang Reinhardt
1962 (15th)	The Miracle Worker	William Gibson
1963 (16th)	Hud	Harriet Frank Jr., and Irving Ravetch
1963 (16th)	America America	Elia Kazan
1963 (16th)	Captain Newman, M.D.	Richard L. Breen, Phoebe Ephron, and Henry Ephron
1963 (16th)	The Balcony	Ben Maddow
1963 (16th)	The Great Escape	James Clavell, and W.R. Burnett
1963 (16th)	The Ugly American	Stewart Stern
1964 (17th)	Becket	Edward Anhalt
1964 (17th)	One Potato, Two Potato	Raphael Hayes, and Orville H. Hampton
1964 (17th)	Seven Days in May	Rod Serling
1964 (17th)	The Best Man	Gore Vidal
1964 (17th)	The Night of the Iguana	Anthony Veiller, and John Huston
1965 (18th)	The Pawnbroker	Morton S. Fine
1965 (18th)	A Patch of Blue	Guy Green
1965 (18th)	The Spy Who Came in from the Cold	Paul Dehn, and Guy Trosper
1965 (18th)	The Collector	Stanley Mann, and John Kohn
1965 (18th)	Ship of Fools	Abby Mann
1966 (19th)	Who's Afraid of Virginia Woolf?	Ernest Lehman
1966 (19th)	Harper	William Goldman
1966 (19th)	The Professionals	Richard Brooks
1966 (19th)	The Sand Pebbles	Robert Anderson
1967 (20th)	Bonnie and Clyde	Robert Benton, and David Newman
1967 (20th)	Guess Who's Coming to Dinner	William Rose
1967 (20th)	In Cold Blood	Richard Brooks
1967 (20th)	In the Heat of the Night	Stirling Silliphant
1967 (20th)	Up the Down Staircase	Tad Mosel
1968 (21st)	The Lion in Winter	James Goldman
1968 (21st)	Petulia	Lawrence B. Marcus
1968 (21st)	Rachel, Rachel	Stewart Stern
1968 (21st)	Rosemary's Baby	Roman Polanski
1968 (21st)	The Heart Is a Lonely Hunter	Thomas C. Ryan
1969 (22nd)	Best Drama Adapted from Another Medium	
1969 (22nd)	Midnight Cowboy †	Waldo Salt
1969 (22nd)	Anne of the Thousand Days ‡	John Hale, and Bridget Boland
1969 (22nd)	The Prime of Miss Jean Brodie	Jay Presson Allen
1969 (22nd)	They Shoot Horses, Don't They? ‡	James Poe, and Robert E. Thompson
1969 (22nd)	True Grit	Marguerite Roberts
1969 (22nd)	Best Drama Written Directly for the Screen	
1969 (22nd)	Butch Cassidy and the Sundance Kid †	William Goldman
1969 (22nd)	Alice's Restaurant	Venable Herndon, and Arthur Penn
1969 (22nd)	Downhill Racer	James Salter
1969 (22nd)	Easy Rider	Peter Fonda, Dennis Hopper, and Terry Southern
1969 (22nd)	Me, Natalie	A. Martin Zwelback

=== 1970s ===
Year	Film	Writer(s)
1970 (23rd)	Best Drama Adapted from Another Medium	
1970 (23rd)	I Never Sang for My Father	Robert Anderson
1970 (23rd)	Airport ‡	George Seaton
1970 (23rd)	Catch-22	Buck Henry
1970 (23rd)	Little Big Man	Calder Willingham
1970 (23rd)	The Great White Hope	Howard Sackler
1970 (23rd)	Best Drama Written Directly for the Screen	
1970 (23rd)	Patton †	Francis Ford Coppola and Edmund H. North
1970 (23rd)	Five Easy pieces ‡	Carole Eastman (As Adrien Joyce)
1970 (23rd)	Love Story ‡	Erich segal
1971 (24th)	Best Drama Adapted from Another Medium	
1971 (24th)	The French Connection †	Ernest Tidyman
1971 (24th)	A Clockwork Orange ‡	Stanley Kubrick
1971 (24th)	Johnny Got His Gun	Dalton Trumbo
1971 (24th)	McCabe & Mrs. Miller	Robert Altman, and Brian McKay
1971 (24th)	The Last Picture Show ‡	Larry McMurtry, and Peter Bodganovich
1971 (24th)	Best Drama Written Directly for the Screen	
1971 (24th)	Sunday Bloody Sunday ‡	Penelope Gilliatt
1971 (24th)	Klute ‡	Andy Lewis, and David E. Lewis
1971 (24th)	Summer of '42 ‡	Hernan Raucher
1971 (24th)	The Hellstrom Chronicle	David Seltzer
1972 (25th)	Best Drama Adapted from Another Medium	
1972 (25th)	The Godfather †	Mario Puzo, and Francis Ford Coppola
1972 (25th)	Deliverance	James Dickley
1972 (25th)	Pete 'n' Tillie ‡	Julius J. Epstein
1972 (25th)	Slaughterhouse-Five	Stephen Geller
1972 (25th)	Sounder ‡	Lonne Elder III
1972 (25th)	Best Drama Written Directly for the Screen	
1972 (25th)	The Candidate †	Jeremy Larner
1972 (25th)	Bad Company	David Newman, and Robert Benton
1972 (25th)	Images	Robert Altman
1972 (25th)	The Culpepper Cattle Co.	Eric Bercovici, and Gregory Prentiss
1972 (25th)	The Great Northfield, Minnesota Raid	Philip Kaufman
1973 (26th)	Best Drama Adapted from Another Medium	
1973 (26th)	Serpico ‡	Waldo Salt, and Norman Wexler
1973 (26th)	Cinderella Liberty	Darryl Ponicsan
1973 (26th)	The Exorcist †	William Peter Blatty
1973 (26th)	The Last Detail ‡	Robert Towne
1973 (26th)	The Paper Chase ‡	James Bridges
1973 (26th)	Best Drama Written Directly for the Screen	
1973 (26th)	Save the Tiger	Steve Shagan
1973 (26th)	Mean Streets	Martin Scorsese, and Mardik Martin
1973 (26th)	Payday	Don Carpenter
1973 (26th)	The Sting †	David S. Ward
1973 (26th)	The Way We Were	Arthur Laurents
1974 (27th)	Best Drama Adapted from Another Medium	
1974 (27th)	The Godfather Part II †	Francis Ford Coppola, and Mario Puzo
1974 (27th)	Conrack	Irving Ravetch, and Harriet Frank Jr.
1974 (27th)	Lenny ‡	Julian Barry
1974 (27th)	The Parallax View	David Giler, and Lorenzo Sempler Jr.
1974 (27th)	The Talking of Pelham One Two Three	Peter Stone
1974 (27th)	Best Drama Written Directly for the Screen	
1974 (27th)	Chinatown †	Robert Towne
1974 (27th)	A Woman Under the Influence	John Cassavetes
1974 (27th)	Alice Doesn't Live Here Anymore ‡	Robert Getchell
1974 (27th)	Harry and Tonto ‡	Paul Mazursky, and Josh Greenfeld
1974 (27th)	The Conversation ‡	Francis Ford Coppola
1975 (28th)	Best Drama Adapted from Another Medium	
1975 (28th)	One Flew Over the Cuckoo's Nest †	Lawrence Hauben, and Bo Goldman
1975 (28th)	Barry Lyndon ‡	Stanley Kubrick
1975 (28th)	The Man Whou Would Be King ‡	John Huston, and Gladys Hill
1975 (28th)	Jaws	Peter Benchley, and Carl Gottlieb
1975 (28th)	The Man in the Glass Booth	Edward Anhalt
1975 (28th)	Best Drama Written Directly for the Screen	
1975 (28th)	Dog Day Afternoon †	Frank Pierson
1975 (28th)	French Connection II	Alexander Jacobs, Robert Dillon, and Laurie Dillon
1975 (28th)	Nashville	Joan Twekesbury
1975 (28th)	The Wind and the Lion	John Milius
1976 (29th)	Best Drama Adapted from Another Medium	
1976 (29th)	All the President's Men †	William Goldman
1976 (29th)	Bound for Glory ‡	Robert Getchell
1976 (29th)	The Seven-Per-Cent Solution ‡	Nicholas Meyer
1976 (29th)	Marathon Man	William Goldman
1976 (29th)	The Shootist	Miles Hood Swarthout, and Scott Hale
1976 (29th)	Best Drama Written Directly for the Screen	
1976 (29th)	Network †	Paddy Chayefsky
1976 (29th)	The Omen	David Seltzer
1976 (29th)	Rocky ‡	Sylvester Stallone
1976 (29th)	Taxi Driver	Paul Schrader
1976 (29th)	The Front ‡	Walter Bernstein
1977 (30th)	Best Drama Adapted from Another Medium	
1977 (30th)	Julia †	Alvin Sargent
1977 (30th)	I Never Promised You a Rose Garden ‡	Gavin Lambert, and Lewis John Carlino
1977 (30th)	Islands in the Stream	Denne Bart Petitclerc
1977 (30th)	Looking for Mr. Goodbar	Richard Brooks
1977 (30th)	Best Drama Written Directly for the Screen	
1977 (30th)	The Turning Point ‡	Arthur Laurents
1977 (30th)	Close Encounters of the Third Kind	Steven Spielberg
1977 (30th)	Saturday Night Fever	Norman Wexler
1977 (30th)	The Late Show ‡	Robert Benton
1978 (31st)	Best Drama Adapted from Another Medium	
1978 (31st)	Midnight Express †	Oliver Stone
1978 (31st)	Bloodbrothers ‡	Walter Newman
1978 (31st)	Go Tell the Spartans	Wendell Mayes
1978 (31st)	Invasion of the Body Snatchers	W.D. Richter
1978 (31st)	Who'll Stop the Rain	Judith Rascoe, and Robert Stone
1978 (31st)	Best Drama Written Directly for the Screen	
1978 (31st)	Coming Home †	Nancy Dowd, Robert C. Jones, and Waldo Salt
1978 (31st)	An Unmarried Woman	Paul Mazursky
1978 (31st)	Days of Heaven	Terrence Malick
1978 (31st)	Interiors ‡	Woody Allen
1978 (31st)	The Deer Hunter ‡	Deric Washburn, Michael Cimino, Louis Garfinkle, and Quinn K. Redeker
1979 (32nd)	Best Drama Adapted from Another Medium	
1979 (32nd)	Kramer vs. Kramer †	Robert Benton
1979 (32nd)	Norma Rae ‡	Irving Ravetch, and Harriet Frank Jr.
1979 (32nd)	Best Drama Written Directly for the Screen	
1979 (32nd)	The China Syndrome ‡	Mike Gray, T. S. Cook, and James Bridges
1979 (32nd)	Apocalypse Now	John Milius, and Francis Ford Coppola

=== 1980s ===
Year	Nominees	Writer(s)
1980 (33rd)	Best Drama Adapted from Other Medium	
1980 (33rd)	Ordinary People †	Alvin Sargent
1980 (33rd)	Coal Miner's Daughter ‡	Thomas Rickman
1980 (33rd)	The Elephant Man ‡	Christopher De Vore, Eric Bergren, and David Lynch
1980 (33rd)	The Great Santini	Lewis John Carlino
1980 (33rd)	The Stunt Man ‡	Lawrence B. Marcus, Richard Rush
1980 (33rd)	Best Drama Written Directly for the Screen	
1980 (33rd)	Melvin and Howard †	Bo Goldman
1980 (33rd)	Fame	Christopher Gore
1980 (33rd)	My Bodyguard	Alan Ornsby
1981 (34th)	Best Drama Adapted from Other Medium	
1981 (34th)	On Golden Pond †	Ernest Thompson, and Donald E. Stewart
1981 (34th)	Cutler's Way	Jeffrey Alan Fiskin
1981 (34th)	Prince of the City ‡	Jay Presson Allen, and Sidney Lumet
1981 (34th)	Ragtime ‡	Michael Weller
1981 (34th)	Best Drama Written Directly for the Screen	
1981 (34th)	Reds‡	Warren Beatty and Trevor Griffiths
1981 (34th)	Absence of Malice	Kurt Luedtke
1981 (34th)	Atlantic City	John Guare
1981 (34th)	Body Heat	Lawrence Kasdan
1982 (35th)	Best Drama Adapted from Other Medium	
1982 (35th)	Missing †	Costa-Gavras, and Donald E. Stewart
1982 (35th)	Sophie's Choice ‡	Alan J. Pakula
1982 (35th)	The Verdict ‡	David Mamet
1982 (35th)	The World According to Garp	Steve Tesich
1982 (35th)	Best Drama Written Directly for the Screen	
1982 (35th)	E.T. the Extra-Terrestrial ‡	Melissa Mathison
1982 (35th)	An Officer and a Gentleman	Douglas Day Stewart
1982 (35th)	Shoot the Moon	Bo Goldman
1983 (36th)	Best Drama Adapted from Other Medium	
1983 (36th)	Reuben, Reuben ‡	Julius J. Epstein
1983 (36th)	The Year of Living Dangerously	David Williamson, Peter Weir, and C.J. Koch
1983 (36th)	The Right Stuff	Philip Kaufman
1983 (36th)	Best Drama Written Directly for the Screen	
1983 (36th)	Tender Mercies †	Horton Foote
1983 (36th)	Silkwood	Nora Ephron, and Alice Arlen
1983 (36th)	WarGames	Lawrence Lasker, and Walter F. Parkes
