= 13th Writers Guild of America Awards =

13th WGA Awards
- Date: 1961
- Organized by: Writers Guild of America, East and the Writers Guild of America, West

The 13th Writers Guild of America Awards honored the best film writers and television writers of 1960. Winners were announced in 1961.

== Winners and nominees ==
=== Film ===
Winners are listed first highlighted in boldface.

**Best Written Musical**: **Bells Are Ringing, Screenplay by Betty Comden and Adolph Green; based on the play by Betty Comden and Adolph Green**; Can-Can, Screenplay by Dorothy Kingsley and Charles Lederer; G.I. Blues, Written by Edmund Beloin and Henry Garson; Let's Make Love, Screenplay by Norman Krasna and Hal Kanter	**Best Written American Drama**: **Elmer Gantry, Screenplay by Richard Brooks; based on the novel by Sinclair Lewis**; Sons and Lovers, Screenplay by Gavin Lambert and T.E.B. Clarke; based on the novel by D.H. Lawrence; Psycho, Screenplay by Joseph Stefano; based on the novel by Robert Bloch; Spartacus, Screenplay by Dalton Trumbo; based on the novel by Howard Fast; The Sundowners, Screenplay by Isobel Lennart; based on the novel by Jon Cleary
**Best Written American Comedy**: **The Apartment, Written by Billy Wilder and I.A.L. Diamond**; North to Alaska, Screenplay by Martin Rackin, John Lee Mahin and Claude Binyon; based on the play by Ladislas Fodor and John H. Kafka; Ocean's 11, Screenplay by Harry Brown and Charles Lederer; story by George Clayton Johnson and Jack Golden Russell; Please Don't Eat the Daisies, Screenplay by Isobel Lennart; based on the book by Jean Kerr; The Facts of Life, Written by Norman Panama and Melvin Frank	

=== Television ===
**Episodic, Longer than 30 Minutes in Length**: **"The Unhired Assassin: Part 1 & 2" – The Untouchables (ABC) – William Spier**; "The Last Hunt" – Bonanza (NBC) – Donald S. Sanford; "Incident of the Dry Drive" – Rawhide (CBS) – John Dunkel	**Episodic Comedy**: **Margaret's Old Flame" – Father Knows Best (CBS) – Dorothy Cooper**; "Chip Off the Old Block" – My Three Sons (ABC) – George Tibbles; "Linda Wants to Be a Boy" – The Danny Thomas Show (ABC) – Charles Stewart, and Jack Elison
**Anthology, 30 Minutes in Length**: **"Interrogation" – Zane Grey Theater (CBS) – Christopher Knopf**; "The Glorious Fourth" – Alcoa Theatre (NBC) – Richard Alan Simmons; "Lady Bug" – Goodyear Theatre (NBC) – Leonard Freeman; "The Trench Coat – The DuPont Show with June Allyson (CBS) – Bruce Geller; "The Monsters Are Due on Maple Street" – The Twilight Zone (CBS) – Rod Serling	**Anthology, More Than One Half Hour**: **"I, Don Quixote" – The DuPont Show of the Month (CBS) – Dale Wasserman**

=== Special awards ===
Laurel Award for Screenwriting Achievement

**George Seaton**
