= Writers Guild of America Award for Best Written Comedy =

- Awarded for: Outstanding Writing for a Comedy Film
- Country: United States
- Presented by: Writers Guild of America
- First award: 1949
- Final award: 1984
- Website: http://www.wga.org/

The Writers Guild Award for Best Written Comedy was an award presented from 1949 to 1984 by the Writers Guild of America, after which it was discontinued.

== Winners and nominees ==
=== Notes ===
- The year indicates when the film was released. The awards were presented the following year.

=== 1940s ===
Year	Film	Writer(s)
1948 (1st)	Sitting Pretty	F. Hugh Herbert
1948 (1st)	A Foreign Affair	Charles Brackett, Billy Wilder, and Richard L. Breen
1948 (1st)	Apartment for Peggy	George Seaton
1948 (1st)	I Remember Mama	Dewitt Bodeen
1948 (1st)	June Bride	Ranald Macdougall
1948 (1st)	Miss Tatlock's Millions	Charles Brackett, and Richard L. Breen
1948 (1st)	No Minor Vices	Arnold Manoff
1948 (1st)	The Mating of Millie	Louella MacFarlane, and St. Clair McKelway
1948 (1st)	The Paleface	Edmund L. Hartmann, Frank Tashlin, and Jack Rose
1949 (2nd)	A Letter to Three Wives	Joseph L. Mankiewicz
1949 (2nd)	Adam's Rib	Ruth Gordon, and Garson Kanin
1949 (2nd)	Come to the Stable	Oscar Millard, and Sally Benson
1949 (2nd)	Every Girl Should Be Married	Stephen Morehouse Avery
1949 (2nd)	I Was a Male War Bride	Charles Lederer, Leonard Spigel, and Hagar Wilde
1949 (2nd)	It Happens Every Spring	Valentine Davies

=== 1950s ===
Year	Film	Writer(s)
1950 (3rd)	All About Eve	Joseph L. Mankiewicz
1950 (3rd)	Adam's Rib	Ruth Gordon, and Garson Kanin
1950 (3rd)	Born Yesterday	Albert Mannheimer
1950 (3rd)	Father of the Bride	Frances Goodrich and Albert Hackett
1950 (3rd)	The Jackpot	Phoebe Ephron, and Henry Ephron
1951 (4th)	Father's Little Dividend	Albert Hackett, and Frances Goodrich
1951 (4th)	Angels in the Outfield	Dorothy Kingsley, and George Wells
1951 (4th)	People Will Talk	Joseph L. Mankiewicz
1951 (4th)	That's My Boy	Cy Howard
1951 (4th)	You're in the Navy Now	Richard Murphy
1952 (5th)	The Quiet Man	Frank Nugent
1952 (5th)	Pat and Mike	Ruth Gordon, and Garson Kanin
1952 (5th)	Room for One More	Jack Rose, and Melville Shavelson
1952 (5th)	The Happy Time	Earl Felton
1952 (5th)	The Marrying Kind	Ruth Gordon, and Garson Kanin
1953 (6th)	Roman Holiday	Ian McLellan Hunter, Dalton Trumbo, and John Dighton
1953 (6th)	How to Marry a Millionaire	Nunnally Johnson
1953 (6th)	Stalag 17	Billy Wilder, and Edwin Blum
1953 (6th)	The Actress	Ruth Gordon
1953 (6th)	The Moon Is Blue	F. Hugh Herbert
1954 (7th)	Sabrina	Billy Wilder, Samuel Taylor, and Ernest Lehman
1954 (7th)	It Should Happen to You	Garson Kanin
1954 (7th)	Knock on Wood	Melvin Frank, and Norman Panama
1954 (7th)	Susan Slept Here	Alex Gottlieb
1954 (7th)	The Long, Long Trailer	Albert Hackett, and Frances Goodrich
1955 (8th)	Mister Roberts	Frank S. Nugent, and Joshua Logan
1955 (8th)	Phffft	George Axelrod
1955 (8th)	The Seven Year Itch	Billy Wilder, and George Axelroad
1955 (8th)	The Tender Trap	Julius J. Epstein
1955 (8th)	To Catch a Thief	John Michael Hayes
1956 (9th)	Around the World in 80 Days	James Poe, John Farrow, and S. J. Perelman
1956 (9th)	Bus Stop	George Axelrod
1956 (9th)	Full of Life	John Fante
1956 (9th)	The Solid Gold Cadillac	Abe Burrows
1956 (9th)	The Teahouse of the August Moon	John Patrick
1957 (10th)	Love in the Afternoon	Billy Wilder, and I.A.L. Diamond
1957 (10th)	Designing Woman	George Wells
1957 (10th)	Don't Go Near the Water	Dorothy Kingsley, and George Wells
1957 (10th)	Operation Mad Ball	Arthur Carter, Jed Harris, and Blake Edwards
1957 (10th)	Will Success Spoil Rock Hunter?	Frank Tashlin
1958 (11th)	Me and the Colonel	S.N. Behrman, and George Froeschel
1958 (11th)	Houseboat	Melville Shavelson, and Jack Rose
1958 (11th)	Indiscreet	Norman Krasna
1958 (11th)	Teacher's Pet	Fay Kanin, and Michael Kanin
1958 (11th)	The Reluctant Debutante	William Douglas-Home, and Julius J. Epstein
1959 (12th)	Some Like It Hot	Billy Wilder, and I.A.L. Diamond
1959 (12th)	A Hole in the Head	Arnold Schulman
1959 (12th)	North by Northwest	Ernest Lehman
1959 (12th)	Operation Petticoat	Stanley Shapiro, and Maurice Richlin
1959 (12th)	Pillow Talk	Stanley Shapiro, and Maurice Richlin

=== 1960s ===
Year	Film	Writer(s)
1960 (13th)	The Apartment	Billy Wilder, and I.A.L. Diamond
1960 (13th)	North to Alaska	Martin Rackin, John Lee Mahin, and Claude Binyon
1960 (13th)	Ocean's 11	Harry Brown, and Charles Lederer
1960 (13th)	Please Don't Eat the Daisies	Isobel Lennart
1960 (13th)	The Facts of Life	Norman Panama, and Melvin Frank
1961 (14th)	Breakfast at Tiffany's	George Axelrod
1961 (14th)	A Majority of One,	Leonard Spigelgass
1961 (14th)	One, Two, Three	Billy Wilder, and I.A.L. Diamond
1961 (14th)	The Absent Minded Professor	Bill Walsh
1961 (14th)	The Parent Trap	David Swift
1962 (15th)	That Touch of Mink	Nate Monaster and Stanley Shapiro
1962 (15th)	Mr. Hobbs Takes a Vacation	Nunnally Johnson
1962 (15th)	The Notorious Landlady	Blake Edwards, and Larry Gelbart
1962 (15th)	Period of Adjustment	Isobel Lennart
1962 (15th)	The Pigeon That Took Rome	Melville Shavelson
1963 (16th)	Lilies of the Field	James Poe
1963 (16th)	Charade	Peter Stone
1963 (16th)	Irma la Douce	I.A.L. Diamond, and Billy Wilder
1963 (16th)	Love with the Proper Stranger	Arnold Schulman
1963 (16th)	The Thrill of It All	Carl Reiner
1964 (17th)	Dr. Strangelove or: How I Learned to Stop Worrying and Love the Bomb	Stanley Kubrick, Peter George, and Terry Southern
1964 (17th)	Father Goose,	Peter Stone, and Frank Tarloff
1964 (17th)	The Pink Panther	Maurice Richlin, and Blake Edwards
1964 (17th)	The World of Henry Orient	Nora Johnson, and Nunnally Johnson
1964 (17th)	Topkapi	Monja Danischewsky
1965 (18th)	A Thousand Clowns	Herb Gardner
1965 (18th)	Cat Ballou	Walter Newman, and Frank Pierson
1965 (18th)	That Darn Cat!	Mildred Gordon, Gordon Gordon, and Bill Walsh
1965 (18th)	The Great Race	Arthur A. Ross
1965 (18th)	What's New Pussycat	Woody Allen
1966 (19th)	The Russians Are Coming, the Russians Are Coming	William Rose
1966 (19th)	How to Steal a Million	Harry Kurnitz
1966 (19th)	Our Man Flint	Hal Fimberg, and Ben Starr
1966 (19th)	The Fortune Cookie	Billy Wilder, and I.A.L. Diamond
1966 (19th)	You're a Big Boy Now	Francis Ford Coppola
1967 (20th)	The Graduate	Buck Henry, and Calder Willingham
1967 (20th)	Barefoot in the Park	Neil Simon
1967 (20th)	Divorce American Style	Norman Lear
1967 (20th)	The Flim-Flam Man	William Rose
1967 (20th)	A Guide for the Married Man	Frank Tarloff
1968 (21st)	The Odd Couple	Neil Simon
1968 (21st)	Hot Millions	Ira Wallach, and Peter Ustinov
1968 (21st)	I Love You, Alice B. Toklas!	Paul Mazursky, and Larry Tucker
1968 (21st)	The Producers	Mel Brooks
1968 (21st)	Yours, Mine and Ours	Melville Shavelson, and Mort Lachman
1969 (22nd)	Best Comedy Adapted from Another Medium	
1969 (22nd)	Goodbye, Columbus ‡	Arnold Schulman
1969 (22nd)	Cactus Flower	I.A.L. Diamond
1969 (22nd)	Gaily, Gaily	Abram S. Ginnes
1969 (22nd)	John and Marty	John Mortimer
1969 (22nd)	The Reivers	Irving Ravetch, and Harriet Frank Jr.
1969 (22nd)	Best Comedy Written Directly for the Screen	
1969 (22nd)	Bob & Carol & Ted & Alice ‡	Paul Mazursky and Larry Tucker
1969 (22nd)	If It's Tuesday, This Must Be Belgium	David Shaw
1969 (22nd)	Popi	Tina Pine, and Lester Pine
1969 (22nd)	Support Your Local Sheriff	William Bowers
1969 (22nd)	Take the Money and Run	Woody Allen, and Mickey Rose

=== 1970s ===
Year	Film	Writer(s)
1970 (23rd)	Best Comedy Adapted from Another Medium	
1970 (23rd)	M*A*S*H †	Ring Lardner Jr.
1970 (23rd)	Lovers and Other Strangers	Renée Taylor, Joseph Bologna, David Zelag Goodman
1970 (23rd)	The Owl and the Pussycat	Buck Henry
1970 (23rd)	The Twelve Chairs	Mel Brooks
1970 (23rd)	Where's Poppa	Robert Klane
1970 (23rd)	Best Comedy Written Directly for the Screen	
1970 (23rd)	The Out-of-Towners	Neil Simon
1970 (23rd)	The Private Life of Sherlock Holmes	Billy Wilder, and I.A.L. Diamond
1970 (23rd)	Quackser Fortune Has a Cousin in the Bronk	Gabriel Walsh
1970 (23rd)	Start the Revolution Without Me	Fred Freeman, and Lawrence J. Cohen
1970 (23rd)	The Cheyenne Social Club	James Lee Barrett
1971 (24th)	Best Comedy Adapted from Another Medium	
1971 (24th)	Kotch	John Paxton
1971 (24th)	A New Leaf	Elaine May
1971 (24th)	Fiddler on the Roof	Joseph Stein
1971 (24th)	Little Murders	Jules Feiffer
1971 (24th)	The Boy Friend	Ken Russell
1971 (24th)	Best Comedy Written Directly for the Screen	
1971 (24th)	The Hospital	Paddy Chayefsky
1971 (24th)	Bananas	Woody Allen, and Mickey Rose
1971 (24th)	Carnal Knowledge	Jules Feiffer
1971 (24th)	Made for Each Other	Renée Taylor, and Joseph Bologna
1971 (24th)	Taking Off	Miloṡ Forman, Jean-Claude Carrière, John Guare, and Jon Klein
1972 (25th)	Best Comedy Adapted from Another Medium	
1972 (25th)	Cabaret ‡	Jay Presson Allen
1972 (25th)	Avanti!	Billy Wilder, and I.A.L. Diamond
1972 (25th)	Butterflies Are Free	Leonard Gershe
1972 (25th)	The Heartbreak Kid	Neil Simon
1972 (25th)	Travels with My Aunt	Jay Presson Allen, and Hugh Wheeler
1972 (25th)	Best Comedy Written Directly for the Screen	
1972 (25th)	What's Up, Doc?	Peter Bogdanovich, Buck Henry, David Newman, and Robert Benton
1972 (25th)	Get to Know Your Rabbit	Jordan Crittenden
1972 (25th)	Hammersmith Is Out	Stanford Whitmore
1972 (25th)	Minnie and Moskowitz	John Cassavetes
1972 (25th)	The War Between Men and Women	Melville Shavelson, and Danny Arnold
1973 (26th)	Best Comedy Adapted from Another Medium	
1973 (26th)	Paper Moon ‡	Alvin Sargent
1973 (26th)	40 Carats	Leonard Gershe
1973 (26th)	Godspell	David Greenne, and John-Michael Tebelak
1973 (26th)	Best Comedy Written Directly for the Screen	
1973 (26th)	A Touch of Class‡	Melvin Frank and Jack Rose
1973 (26th)	American Graffiti ‡	George Lucas, Gloria Katz, and Willard Huyck
1973 (26th)	Blume in Love	Paul Mazursky
1973 (26th)	Sleeper	Woody Allen, and Marshall Brickman
1973 (26th)	Slither	W.D. Richter
1974 (27th)	Best Comedy Adapted from Another Medium	
1974 (27th)	The Apprenticeship of Duddy Kravitz ‡	Mordecai Richler, and Lionel Chetwynd
1974 (27th)	The Front Page	Billy Wilder, and I.A.L. Diamond
1974 (27th)	Young Frankenstein ‡	Gene Wilder, and Mel Brooks
1974 (27th)	Best Comedy Written Directly for the Screen	
1974 (27th)	Blazing Saddles	Mel Brooks, Norman Steinberg, Andrew Bergman, Richard Pryor, and Alan Uger
1974 (27th)	California Split	Joseph Walsh
1974 (27th)	Claudine	Tina Pine, and Lester Pine
1974 (27th)	Phantom of the Paradise	Brian de Palma
1974 (27th)	The Sugarland Express	Hal Barwood, Matthew Robbins, and Steven Spielberg
1975 (28th)	Best Comedy Adapted from Another Medium	
1975 (28th)	The Sunshine Boys ‡	Neil Simon
1975 (28th)	Hester Street	Joan Micklin Silver
1975 (28th)	The Prisoner of Second Avenue	Neil Simon
1975 (28th)	Best Comedy Written Directly for the Screen	
1975 (28th)	Shampoo ‡	Robert Towne and Warren Beatty
1975 (28th)	Heats of the West	Rob Thompson
1975 (28th)	Smile	Jerry Belson
1975 (28th)	The Return of the Pink Panther	Frank Waldman, and Blake Edwards
1976 (29th)	Best Comedy Adapted from Another Medium	
1976 (29th)	The Pink Panther Strikes Again	Frank Waldman, and Blake Edwards
1976 (29th)	Family Plot	Ernest Lehman
1976 (29th)	Stay Hungry	Charles Gaines, and Bob Rafelson
1976 (29th)	The Bingo Long Traveling All-Stars & Motor Kings	Hal Barwood, and Matthew Robbins
1976 (29th)	The Ritz	Terrence McNally
1976 (29th)	Best Comedy Written Directly for the Screen	
1976 (29th)	The Bad News Bears	Bill Lancaster
1976 (29th)	Murder by Death	Neil Simon
1976 (29th)	Next Stop, Greenwich Village	Paul Mazursky
1976 (29th)	Silent Movie	Mel Brooks, Ron Clark, Rudy De Luca, and Barry Levinson
1976 (29th)	Silver Streak	Colin Higgins
1977 (30th)	Best Comedy Adapted from Another Medium	
1977 (30th)	Oh, God! ‡	Larry Gelbart
1977 (30th)	The Spy Who Loved Me	Christopher Wood, and Richard Maibaum
1977 (30th)	Semi-Tough	Walter Bernstein
1977 (30th)	Best Comedy Written Directly for the Screen	
1977 (30th)	Annie Hall	Woody Allen and Marshall Brickman
1977 (30th)	Star Wars	George Lucas
1977 (30th)	Slap Shot	Nancy Dowd
1977 (30th)	The Goodbye Girl	Neil Simon
1978 (31st)	Best Comedy Adapted from Another Medium	
1978 (31st)	Heaven Can Wait ‡	Elaine May, and Warren Beatty
1978 (31st)	California Suite ‡	Neil Simon
1978 (31st)	Same Time, Next Year ‡	Bernard Slade
1978 (31st)	Superman	Mario Puzo, David Newman, Leslie Newman, and Robert Benton
1978 (31st)	Who Is Killing the Great Chefs of Europe?	Peter Stone
1978 (31st)	Best Comedy Written Directly for the Screen	
1978 (31st)	Movie Movie	Larry Gelbart and Sheldon Keller
1978 (31st)	A Wedding	John Considine, Patricia Resnick, Allan F. Nicholls, and Robert Altman
1978 (31st)	Animal House	Harold Ramis, Douglas Kenney, and Chris Miller
1978 (31st)	House Calls	Max Shulman, Julius J. Epstein, Alan Mandel, and Charles Shyer
1978 (31st)	Once in Paris...	Frank D. Gilroy
1979 (32nd)	Best Comedy Adapted from Another Medium	
1979 (32nd)	Being There	Jerzy Kosinski
1979 (32nd)	Starting Over	James L. Brooks
1979 (32nd)	A Little Romance ‡	Allan Burns
1979 (32nd)	Best Comedy Written Directly for the Screen	
1979 (32nd)	Breaking Away †	Steve Tesich
1979 (32nd)	10	Blake Edwards
1979 (32nd)	Manhattan ‡	Woody Allen, and Marshall Brickman

=== 1980s ===
Year	Nominees	Writer(s)
1980 (33rd)	Best Comedy Adapted from Other Another Medium	
1980 (33rd)	Airplane!	Jim Abrahams, David Zucker, and Jerry Zucker
1980 (33rd)	Hopscotch	Brian Garfield, and Bryan Forbes
1980 (33rd)	Star Wars: Episode V - The Empire Strikes Back	Leigh Brackett, and Lawrence Kasdan
1980 (33rd)	Best Comedy Written Directly for the Screen	
1980 (33rd)	Private Benjamin †	Nancy Meyers, Harvey Miller, and Charles Shyer
1980 (33rd)	Nine to Five	Colin Higgins, and Patricia Resnick
1980 (33rd)	Return of the Secaucus	John Sayles
1980 (33rd)	Stardust Memories	Woody Allen
1981 (34th)	Best Comedy Adapted from Other Another Medium	
1981 (34th)	Rich and Famous	Gerald Ayres
1981 (34th)	For Your Eyes Only'	Richard Maibaum, and Michael G. Wilson
1981 (34th)	First Monday in October	Jerome Lawrence, and Robert E. Lee
1981 (34th)	Best Comedy Written Directly for the Screen	
1981 (34th)	Arthur ‡	Steve Gordon
1981 (34th)	Raiders of the Lost Ark	Lawrence Kasdan, George Lucas, and Philip Kaufman
1981 (34th)	S.O.B.	Blake Edwards
1981 (34th)	The Four Seasons	Alan Alda
1982 (35th)	Best Comedy Adapted from Other Another Medium	
1982 (35th)	Victor Victoria ‡	Blake Edwards
1982 (35th)	Fast Times at Ridgemont High	Cameron Crowe
1982 (35th)	Best Comedy Written Directly for the Screen	
1982 (35th)	Tootsie ‡	Don McGuire, Larry Gelbart, and Murray Schisgal
1982 (35th)	Diner	Barry Levinson
1982 (35th)	My Favorite Year	Norman Steinberg, and Dennis Palumbo
1983 (36th)	Best Comedy Adapted from Other Another Medium	
1983 (36th)	Terms of Endearment †	James L. Brooks
1983 (36th)	A Christmas Story	Jean Shepherd, Leigh Brown, and Bob Clark
1983 (36th)	To Be or Not to Be	Thomas Meehan, and Ronny Graham
1983 (36th)	Best Comedy Written Directly for the Screen	
1983 (36th)	The Big Chill ‡	Lawrence Kasdan, and Barbara Benedek
1983 (36th)	Risky Business	Paul Brickman
1983 (36th)	Zelig	Woody Allen
