= 7th Writers Guild of America Awards =

7th WGA Awards
- Date: 1955
- Organized by: Writers Guild of America, East and the Writers Guild of America, West

The 7th Writers Guild of America Awards honored the best film writers of 1954. Winners were announced in 1955.

== Winners and nominees ==
=== Film ===
Winners are listed first highlighted in boldface.

**Best Written Musical**: **Seven Brides for Seven Brothers, Screenplay by Albert Hackett & Frances Goodrich & Dorothy Kingsley**; A Star is Born, Screenplay by Moss Hart; based on the play by Dorothy Parker, Alan Campbell, and Robert Carson; Carmen Jones, Screenplay by Harry Kleiner; based on the book by Oscar Hammerstein II; The Glenn Miller Story, Screenplay by Valentine Davies, and Oscar Brodney; There's No Business Like Show Business, Screenplay by Phoebe Ephron, and Henry Ephron; story by Lamar Trotti	**Best Written Drama**: **On the Waterfront, Written by Budd Schulberg**; Executive Suite, Screenplay by Ernest Lehman; based on the novel by Cameron Hawley; Rear Window, Screenplay by John Michael Hayes; story by Cornell Woolrich; The Barefoot Contessa, Written by Joseph L. Mankiewicz; The Country Girl, Screenplay by George Seaton; based on the play by Clifford Odets
**Best Written Comedy**: **Sabrina, Written by Billy Wilder & Samuel Taylor & Ernest Lehman**; It Should Happen to You, Written by Garson Kanin; Knock on Wood, Screenplay by Melvin Frank, and Norman Panama; Susan Slept Here, Screenplay by Alex Gottlieb; based on the play by Steve Fisher, and Alex Gottlieb; The Long, Long Trailer, Screenplay by Albert Hackett, and Frances Goodrich; based on the novel by Clinton Twiss

=== Special awards ===
Laurel Award for Screenwriting Achievement

**Robert Riskin**
