= 21st Writers Guild of America Awards =

21st WGA Awards
- Date: 1969
- Organized by: Writers Guild of America, East and the Writers Guild of America, West

The 21st Writers Guild of America Awards honored the best film writers and television writers of 1968. Winners were announced in 1969.

== Winners and nominees ==
=== Film ===
Winners are listed first highlighted in boldface.

**Best Written Musical**: **Funny Girl, Screenplay by Isobel Lennart; Based on the musical by Isobel Lennart**; Finian's Rainbow, Screenplay by E.Y. Harburg and Fred Saidy; Based on their book; Star!, Written by William Fairchild	**Best Written American Drama**: **The Lion in Winter, Screenplay by James Goldman; based on his play**; The Heart Is a Lonely Hunter, Screenplay by Thomas C. Ryan; Based on the novel by Carson McCullers; Petulia, Screenplay by Lawrence B. Marcus; Based on the novel by John Haase; Rachel, Rachel, Screenplay by Stewart Stern; Based on the novel by Margaret Laurence; Rosemary's Baby, Screenplay by Roman Polanski; Based on the novel by Ira Levin
**Best Written American Comedy**: **The Odd Couple, Screenplay by Neil Simon; Based on his play**; Hot Millions, Written by Ira Wallach and Peter Ustinov; I Love You, Alice B. Toklas!, Written by Paul Mazursky and Larry Tucker; The Producers, Written by Mel Brooks; Yours, Mine and Ours, Screenplay by Melville Shavelson and Mort Lachman; Story by Bob Carroll Jr. and Madelyn Davis	**Best Written American Original Screenplay**: **The Producers, Written by Mel Brooks**; Buona Sera, Mrs. Campbell, Screenplay by Melvin Frank, Denis Norden and Sheldon Keller; Faces, Written by John Cassavetes; I Love You, Alice B. Toklas!, Written by Paul Mazursky and Larry Tucker; The Brotherhood, Written by Lewis John Carlino

=== Television ===
**Episodic Comedy**: **"Viva mart" – Get Smart (CBS) – Bill Idelson and Sam Bobrick**; "The Old Man & the She" – He & She (CBS) – Leonard Stern and Arne Sultan; "Knock, Knock, Who's There? Fernando, Fernando Who?" – He & She (CBS) – Chris Hayward and Allan Burns; "Before You Bury Me Can I Say Something?" – He & She (CBS) – Jim Parker and Arold Margolin	**Episodic Drama**: **"To Kill a Madman" – Judd for the Defense (ABC) – Robert Lewin**; "Cocoon" – Hawaii Five-O (CBS) – Leonard Freeman; "No Law Against Murder" – Judd for the Defense (ABC) – Harold Gast; "Commitment" – Judd for the Defense (ABC) – Paul Monash; "The Name Is Mannix" – Mannix (CBS) – Bruce Geller; "Return to Tomorrow" – Star Trek (NBC) – John T. Dugan; "Take Your Lover in the Ring" – The Outcasts (ABC) – Anthony Lawrence

=== Special awards ===
Laurel Award for Screenwriting Achievement

**Carl Foreman**

Valentine Davies Award

**Dore Schary**
