= 5th Writers Guild of America Awards =

5th WGA Awards
- Date: 1953
- Organized by: Writers Guild of America, East and the Writers Guild of America, West

The 5th Writers Guild of America Awards honored the best film writers of 1952. Winners were announced in 1953.

== Winners and nominees ==
=== Film ===
Winners are listed first highlighted in boldface.

**Best Written Musical**: **Singin' in the Rain, Written by Betty Comden and Adolph Green**; Hans Christian Andersen, Screenplay by Moss Hart; Story by Myles Connolly; I'll See You in My Dreams, Written by Melville Shavelson and Jack Rose; Where's Charley?, Screenplay by John Monks Jr.; Based on a play by George Abbott and Brandon Thomas; With a Song in My Heart, Written by Lamar Trotti	**Best Written Drama**: **High Noon, Screenplay by Carl Foreman**; 5 Fingers, Screenplay by Michael Wilson; Based on a novel by L. C. Moyzisch; Come Back, Little Sheba, Screenplay by Ketti Frings; Based on a play by William Inge; Moulin Rouge; Screenplay by Anthony Veiller and John Huston; Based on a novel by Pierre La Mure; The Bad and the Beautiful, Screenplay by Charles Schnee; Story by George Bradshaw
**Best Written Comedy**: **The Quiet Man, Screenplay by Frank Nugent; Story by Maurice Walsh**; Pat and Mike; Written by Ruth Gordon and Garson Kanin; Room for One More; Screenplay by Jack Rose and Melville Shavelson; Based on a novel by Anna Perrot Rose; The Happy Time; Screenplay by Earl Felton; Based on a story by Robert Fontaine & a play by Samuel A. Taylor; The Marrying Kind; Written by Ruth Gordon and Garson Kanin	

=== Special awards ===
Laurel Award for Screen Writing Achievement

Sonya Levien
