= Rich, Young and Pretty =

1951 film by Norman Taurog

- Theatrical release poster
- Directed by: Norman Taurog
- Screenplay by: Dorothy Cooper; Sidney Sheldon
- Story by: Dorothy Cooper
- Produced by: Joe Pasternak
- Starring: Jane Powell; Danielle Darrieux; Wendell Corey; Fernando Lamas; Marcel Dalio; Una Merkel; Richard Anderson; Jean Murat; Vic Damone
- Cinematography: Robert H. Planck
- Edited by: Gene Ruggiero
- Music by: Sammy Cahn (lyrics); Nicholas Brodszky (music)
- Production company: Metro-Goldwyn-Mayer
- Distributed by: Loew's, Inc.
- Release dates: July 25, 1951 (New York); August 29, 1951 (Los Angeles)
- Running time: 95 minutes
- Country: United States
- Language: English
- Budget: $1,528,000
- Box office: $2,999,000

Rich, Young and Pretty is a 1951 Metro-Goldwyn-Mayer American musical comedy film produced by Joe Pasternak, directed by Norman Taurog and starring Jane Powell, Danielle Darrieux, Wendell Corey and Fernando Lamas. The original story was written by Dorothy Cooper and adapted as a screenplay by Cooper and Sidney Sheldon. The film features The Four Freshmen and introduces Vic Damone.

== Plot ==
Elizabeth Rogers accompanies her wealthy Texan rancher father on a visit to Paris, where her mother lives. While there, she meets Andre, an eager young Frenchman. Her father tries to prevent her from marrying Andre to avoid the mistake that he had made when he married her mother.

== Cast ==
- Jane Powell as Elizabeth Rogers
- Danielle Darrieux as Marie Devarone
- Wendell Corey as Jim Stauton Rogers
- Vic Damone as Andre Milan
- Fernando Lamas as Paul Sarnac
- Marcel Dalio as Claude Duval
- Una Merkel as Glynnie
- Richard Anderson as Bob Lennart
- Jean Murat as Henri Milan
- Hans Conreid as Maître d'Hotel
- Four Freshmen Quartet as Four Musicians

== Soundtrack ==
MGM promotion for the film emphasized the film's "songs rather than its patter". Sammy Cahn wrote the lyrics and Nicholas Brodszky wrote the music for several songs, including "Wonder Why", which was nominated for an Academy Award for Best Original Song.

Other original songs written by Cahn and Brodszky include "We Never Talk Much (We Just Sit Around)", "How D'Ya Like Your Eggs in the Morning?" and "I Can See You", which became a jukebox favorite.

== Reception ==
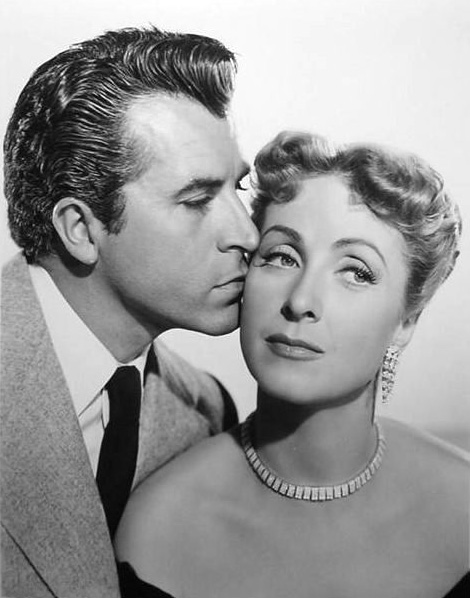
Fernando Lamas and Danielle Darrieux

In a July 1951 review for The New York Times, critic Bosley Crowther wrote: "Since the temperature 1s obviously torrid, Metro-Goldwyn-Mayer cannot be blamed for releasing 'Rich, Young and Pretty' at this time. For the newcomer ... is, to borrow a seasoned phrase, appropriate summer entertainment. And, the company, having had the good taste to entrust the entire matter to producer Joe Pasternak, an old hand with tuneful talkies, is making much of a slight story, youthful and not-too-youthful songsters and Technicolor. 'Rich, Young and Pretty' is, to put it into a nutshell, pretty as a picture postcard and just about as exciting. ... Call it a standard songfest suitable for the summer."

Critic John L. Scott of the Los Angeles Times wrote: "A sprightly, somewhat sugary love story ... is for the most part beguiling—a pleasant hour and a half."

Time wrote: "The movie tackles its situations without verve or humor, and handles its lightweight problems as ponderously as if they had been propounded by Ibsen in one of his gloomier moods."

According to MGM records, the film earned $1,935,000 in the U.S. and Canada and $1,064,000 elsewhere, returning a profit of $54,000.
