= 10th Writers Guild of America Awards =

10th WGA Awards
- Date: 1958
- Organized by: Writers Guild of America, East and the Writers Guild of America, West

The 10th Writers Guild of America Awards honored the best film writers and television writers of 1957. Winners were announced in 1958.

== Winners and nominees ==
=== Film ===
Winners are listed first highlighted in boldface.

**Best Written Musical**: **Les Girls, Screenplay by John Patrick; story by Vera Caspary**; Funny Face, Screenplay by Leonard Gershe; Pal Joey, Screenplay by Dorothy Kingsley; based on the play by John O'Hara; The Joker Is Wild, Screenplay by Oscar Saul; based on the book by Art Cohn; The Pajama Game, Screenplay by George Abbott, and Richard Bissell; based on the novel by Richard Bissell	**Best Written American Drama**: **12 Angry Men, Screenplay by Reginald Rose**; Heaven Knows, Mr. Allison, Screenplay by John Lee Mahin, and John Huston; based on the novel by Charles Shaw; Paths of Glory, Screenplay by Stanley Kubrick, Calder Willingham, and Jim Thompson; based on the novel by Humphrey Cobb; Peyton Place, Screenplay by John Michael Hayes; based on the novel by Grace Metalious; Sayonara, Screenplay by Paul Osborn; based on the novel by James A. Michener
**Best Written American Comedy**: **Love in the Afternoon, Screenplay by Billy Wilder, and I.A.L. Diamond; based on the novel by Claude Anet**; Designing Woman, Screenplay by George Wells; story by Helen Rose; Don't Go Near the Water, Screenplay by Dorothy Kingsley, and George Wells; based on the novel by William Brinkley; Operation Mad Ball, Screenplay by Arthur Carter, Jed Harris, and Blake Edwards; based on the play by Arthur Carter; Will Success Spoil Rock Hunter?, Screenplay by Frank Tashlin; based on a play by George Axelrod	

=== Television ===
**Western Episode**
- **"Helen of Abajinian" – Have Gun - Will Travel (CBS) – Gene Roddenberry**
  - "Ghostface" – Broken Arrow (ABC) – John Dunkel
  - "The Quick and the Dead – Maverick (ABC) – Douglas Heyes
  - End of a Gun – The 20th Century-Fox Hour (CBS) – Sam Peckinpah
  - "The Child" – The Restless Gun (NBC) – Herbert Little Jr., David Victor; story by John Payne

=== Special awards ===
Laurel Award for Screenwriting Achievement

**John Lee Mahin**
