= Porgy and Bess (film) =

1959 American musical film

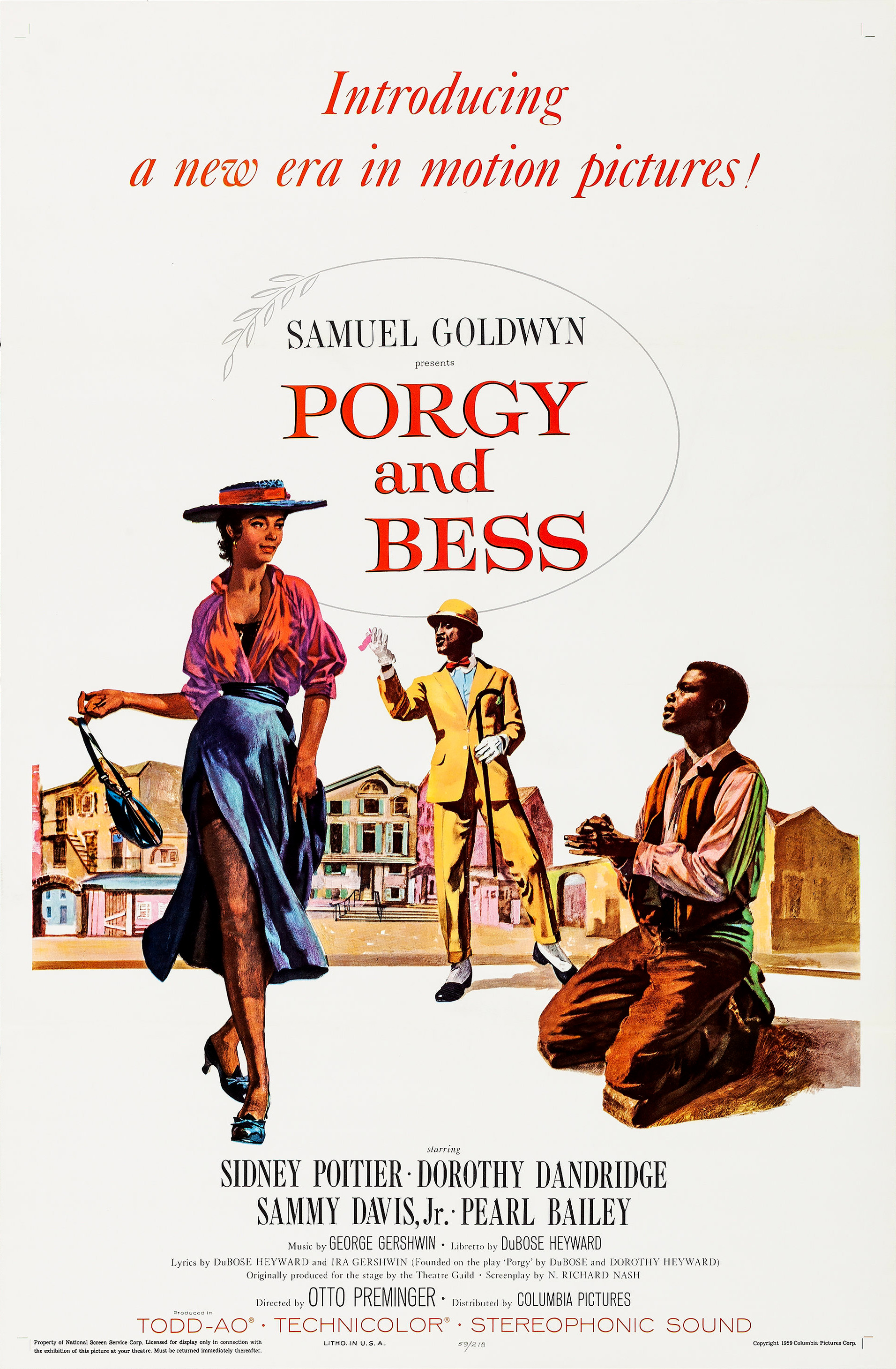
- Theatrical release poster
- Directed by: Otto Preminger
- Written by: N. Richard Nash
- Based on: Porgy and Bess by DuBose Heyward
- Produced by: Samuel Goldwyn
- Starring: Sidney Poitier; Dorothy Dandridge; Sammy Davis Jr. Pearl Bailey
- Cinematography: Leon Shamroy
- Edited by: Daniel Mandell
- Music by: André Previn; Songs: George Gershwin; Ira Gershwin
- Production company: Samuel Goldwyn Productions
- Distributed by: Columbia Pictures
- Release date: June 24, 1959
- Running time: 138 minutes
- Country: United States
- Language: English
- Budget: $7 million
- Box office: $3.5 million

Porgy and Bess is a 1959 American musical drama film directed by Otto Preminger, and starring Sidney Poitier and Dorothy Dandridge in the titular roles. It is based on the 1935 opera Porgy and Bess by George Gershwin, DuBose Heyward and Ira Gershwin, in turn based on Heyward's 1925 novel Porgy, as well as Heyward's subsequent 1927 non-musical stage adaptation, co-written with his wife Dorothy. The film's screenplay, which turned the operatic recitatives into spoken dialogue, was very closely based on the opera and was written by N. Richard Nash. In 2011, the film was chosen for preservation in the National Film Registry of the Library of Congress.

The project was the last for Samuel Goldwyn. Due to its controversial subject matter, the film was shown only briefly following its initial reserved seat engagements in major cities, where it drew mixed reviews from critics. Two months after its release, Goldwyn grudgingly conceded, "No one is waiting breathlessly for my next picture."

The film was unavailable on home video for years, and has been described as the "Holy Grail of "lost films." One of the few complete copies of the film was shown in 2007, 2010, 2019,and 2026.

== Plot ==
Set in the early 1900s in the fictional Catfish Row section of Charleston, South Carolina, which serves as home to a black fishing community, the story focuses on the title characters: crippled beggar Porgy, who travels about in a goat-drawn cart, and the drug-addicted Bess, who lives with stevedore Crown, the local bully. While high on cocaine supplied by Sportin' Life, Crown kills Robbins after the latter vanquishes him in a craps game; Bess urges Crown to flee. Sportin' Life suggests she accompany him to New York City, an offer Bess declines. She seeks refuge with her neighbors, all of whom refuse to help her. Porgy finally agrees to let her stay with him.

Bess and Porgy settle into domestic life together and soon fall in love. Just before a church picnic on Kittiwah Island, Sportin' Life once again approaches Bess, but Porgy warns him to leave her alone. Bess wishes to stay with Porgy, since he cannot attend the picnic because of his disability, but he urges her to go. After the picnic ends, and before Bess can leave, Crown, who has been hiding in the woods on the island, confronts her. She initially struggles to resist him but Crown rapes her. The others, not knowing just what has happened, leave and return to the mainland.

Two days later, Bess returns to Catfish Row in a state of delirium. When she recovers, she remembers what happened. Feeling that she betrayed Porgy, she begs his forgiveness. She admits she is unable to resist Crown and asks Porgy to protect her from him. Crown eventually returns to claim his woman, and when he draws his knife, Porgy strangles him. He is detained by the police merely to identify the body, but Sportin' Life, who has fed Bess cocaine, convinces her Porgy inadvertently will reveal himself to be the murderer. In her drugged state, she finally accepts his offer to take her to New York. When Porgy returns and discovers she is gone, he sets off to find her.

== Cast ==
- Sidney Poitier as Porgy (singing voice dubbed by Robert McFerrin)
- Dorothy Dandridge as Bess (singing voice dubbed by Adele Addison)
- Sammy Davis Jr. as "Sportin' Life"
- Pearl Bailey as Maria
- Brock Peters as Crown
- Diahann Carroll as Clara (singing voice dubbed by Loulie Jean Norman)
- Leslie Scott as Jake, The Fisherman
- Ruth Attaway as Serena Robbins
- Claude Akins as Detective
- Clarence Muse as Peter
- Everdinne Wilson as Annie
- Joel Fluellen as Robbins
- Earl Jackson as Mingo
- Moses LaMarr as Nelson
- Margaret Hairston as Lily
- Ivan Dixon as Jim
- Antoine Durousseau as Scipio
- Helen Thigpen as Strawberry Woman
- Vince Townsend as Elderly Man
- Bill Walker as The Undertaker
- Roy Glenn as Frazier
- Maurice Manson as The Coroner
- Nichelle Nichols as Dancer (uncredited, her film debut)

== Production ==
=== Development ===
The original 1935 Broadway production of Porgy and Bess closed after only 124 performances. A 1942 revival, stripped of all recitative, fared slightly better, as did a subsequent national tour and another revival in 1953, but in financial terms, the work did not have a very good track record. Still, there were many who thought it had potential as a film. Otto Preminger was one of several producers, including Hal B. Wallis, Louis B. Mayer, Dore Schary, Anatole Litvak, Joseph L. Mankiewicz and Harry Cohn, who had tried to secure the film rights without success. Cohn even wanted to cast Fred Astaire, Al Jolson and Rita Hayworth, and have them perform in blackface, something to which the Gershwin estate vehemently opposed. (Note: The Gershwin estate stipulated that unless it was absolutely impossible given very unusual circumstances, Porgy and Bess must always be performed by real African-Americans.) For 25 years, Ira Gershwin had resisted all offers, certain that his brother's work would be "debased" by Hollywood. Finally, on May 8, 1957, he sold the rights to Samuel Goldwyn for $600,000 as a down payment against 10% of the gross receipts.

When Langston Hughes, Goldwyn's first choice for screenwriter, proved to be unavailable, the producer approached Paul Osborn, Frances Goodrich and Albert Hackett, Sidney Kingsley, Jerome Lawrence and Robert E. Lee, Clifford Odets and Rod Serling, all of whom expressed varying degrees of interest, but cited prior commitments. Goldwyn finally signed N. Richard Nash, who completed a lengthy first draft by December 1957. For director, Goldwyn sought Elia Kazan, Frank Capra and King Vidor without success. He finally settled on Rouben Mamoulian, director of the original Broadway productions of both the play Porgy and its operatic adaptation.

Nash's screenplay changed virtually all of the sung recitative to spoken dialogue, as in the 1942 stage revival. For example, in the original opera, Porgy sings the line "If there weren't no Crown, Bess, if there was only just you and Porgy, what then?", upon which Bess launches into the duet "I Loves You Porgy". In the film, the line is spoken. The recitatives themselves did not have to really be rewritten, because they do not rhyme, while the words in all the songs do.

=== Casting ===
Because of its themes of fornication, drug addiction, prostitution, violence and murder, Porgy and Bess proved difficult to cast. Many Black actors felt the story did nothing but perpetuate negative stereotypes. Harry Belafonte thought the role of Porgy was demeaning and declined. So many performers refused to participate that Goldwyn actually considered Jackie Robinson, Sugar Ray Robinson and singer Clyde McPhatter for major roles, disregarding their total lack of acting experience. Only Las Vegas entertainer Sammy Davis Jr. expressed interest in appearing, and arranged to audition for a role during a party at Judy Garland's home. Ira Gershwin's wife Lee was present and, horrified by Davis' vulgarity, implored Goldwyn, "Swear on your life you'll never use him." The producer, who sneeringly called Davis "that monkey", assured her he would not cast him and offered the role of Sportin' Life to Cab Calloway instead. When Calloway declined, Davis had Frank Sinatra and some of his associates pressure Goldwyn, who finally announced to Davis, "The part is yours. Now will you get all these guys off my back?"

Goldwyn offered Sidney Poitier $75,000 to portray Porgy. The actor had serious reservations and initially turned it down, but his agent led Goldwyn to believe she could persuade her client to star. This proved unsuccessful, and Goldwyn threatened to sue the actor for breaching an oral contract. When Poitier realized his refusal to star in Porgy might jeopardize his appearance in the Stanley Kramer film The Defiant Ones, he reconsidered and grudgingly accepted, assuring Goldwyn that he would "do the part to the best of my ability – under the circumstances."

Mezzo Muriel Smith, co-creator (double-cast with soprano Muriel Rahn) of the Broadway title role in Oscar Hammerstein's Carmen Jones, and originator of the role of Bloody Mary in the original London cast of Rodgers and Hammerstein's South Pacific, whose more important movie ghost-singing assignments included dubbing for Zsa Zsa Gabor in John Huston's Moulin Rouge (1952) and for Juanita Hall in the film version of South Pacific (1958), turned down Goldwyn's offer to portray Bess, responding that the work "Doesn't do right by my people." This statement contradicts another that Goldwyn's first and only choice for Bess was Dorothy Dandridge, who accepted the role without enthusiasm. Her Carmen Jones co-stars Pearl Bailey, Brock Peters and Diahann Carroll also accepted roles, but all had concerns about how their characters would be portrayed. Bailey warned costume designer Irene Sharaff that she would not wear any bandannas because she was unwilling to look like Aunt Jemima.

Completing the primary creative team were production designer Oliver Smith, who recently had won the Tony Award for Best Scenic Design for My Fair Lady, and André Previn and Ken Darby, who would supervise the music. Because Poitier could not sing and the score was beyond Dandridge's range, their vocals would be dubbed, and Goldwyn insisted that only black singers could be hired for the task. Leontyne Price, who had portrayed Bess in the 1952 European tour and the acclaimed 1953 Broadway revival, was invited to sing the role on film, but responded, "No body, no voice." Adele Addison and Robert McFerrin eventually were hired, but neither received screen credit.

=== Music ===
Despite Goldwyn's intention that the music sound as much like the original opera as possible, he did allow Previn and his team to completely rescore and even change the underscoring heard during the fight scenes and at several other moments, as well as in the overture.

=== Filming ===
A full-cast dress rehearsal was scheduled for July 3, 1958, but slightly after 4:00 am, a fire destroyed all of the sets and costumes, at a loss of $2 million. Rumors that the blaze had been started by Black arsonists determined to shut down production immediately began to circulate. Goldwyn publicly denounced this rumor, although studio insiders were certain that the fire had been set deliberately. The production was placed on hiatus for six weeks to allow for reconstruction. During this period, director Mamoulian repeatedly clashed with the producer about every aspect of the film, leading Goldwyn to fire him. William Wyler was willing to step in if Goldwyn could postpone a few months, but the producer opted to replace Mamoulian with Otto Preminger, who had already started preparing both Anatomy of a Murder (1959) and Exodus (1960), but was willing to set them aside for the opportunity to helm Porgy and Bess. Mamoulian was incensed not only that he had been dismissed after eight months of pre-production work, but that he had been replaced by Preminger, who had taken over Laura (1944) when Mamoulian had ignored all of Preminger's directives as producer of that film. Claiming Goldwyn had fired him for "frivolous, spiteful, or dictatorial reasons not pertinent to the director's skill or obligation", he brought his case to the Directors Guild of America, which notified all its members, including Preminger, that they could not enter into a contract with Goldwyn. This prompted the Producers Guild of America to become involved. They insisted Goldwyn had the right to change directors and was not in breach of contract because he had paid Mamoulian in full. When Mamoulian changed tactics and attempted to raise charges of discrimination against Preminger, he lost the support he had managed to gather, and after three weeks, the matter was resolved in favor of Goldwyn. Mamoulian later tried to get credit, but the Screen Directors Guild voted to give sole credit to Preminger.

The change of directors was stressful for Dandridge who, according to her manager, had ended an affair with Preminger when she became pregnant and he insisted she have an abortion. According to the director, he had ended his relationship with the actress because he was neither willing to marry her nor deal with her unstable emotions. In any event, Dandridge was unhappy and lacked self-assurance, especially when the director began to criticize her performance.

Preminger objected to the stylized sets and elaborate costumes – "You've got a two-dollar whore in a two-thousand-dollar dress", he admonished Goldwyn. He also wanted Previn to provide orchestrations favoring jazz rather than symphony, but the producer wanted the film to look and sound as much like the original Broadway production he had admired as possible. He grudgingly agreed to allow the director to film the picnic sequence on Venice Island near Stockton, but for the most part, Preminger felt his creative instincts were stifled. Only in the area of actual filming did he exert complete control by shooting as little extra footage as possible so Goldwyn couldn't tamper with the film once it was completed.

Principal photography ended on December 16, 1958. Columbia executives were unhappy with the film, particularly its downbeat ending, and one suggested it be changed to allow Porgy to walk. Goldwyn, however, was determined it be as faithful to its source, going so far as to insist it be described as an "American folk opera" rather than a "musical" in all advertising.

== Release ==
=== Theatrical exhibition ===
Columbia Pictures won a bidding contest for the rights to distribute the film, with Goldwyn retaining approval over advertising and exhibition.

Porgy and Bess opened on a reserved-seat basis at the Warner Theatre in New York City on June 24, 1959, and the Carthay Circle Theater in Los Angeles on July 5. Shortly after opening in Atlanta in early August, its run was cancelled after angering Black viewers, and despite the Atlanta Journal accusing Goldwyn of censoring his own film, Goldwyn pulled the film from several other areas nationwide as well.

In August 1959, Porgy and Bess was the fourth highest-grossing film in the United States. It remained in fourth place in September and October. It moved up to second in November, before falling to sixth in December and fifth in January 1960. Despite being high up in the box office charts for seven months, the film only earned back half its $7 million cost in the United States and Canada.

It was the first English-language musical shown in Germany in its original version with subtitles, rather than the standard practice of dubbing and, despite American musicals generally not doing well in Europe, it was a hit in Germany and Switzerland.

=== Critical reception ===
Porgy and Bess received mixed reviews. Bosley Crowther of The New York Times wrote the "most haunting of American musical dramas has been transmitted on the screen in a way that does justice to its values and almost compensates for the long wait...N. Richard Nash has adapted and Otto Preminger has directed a script that fairly bursts with continuous melodrama and the pregnant pressure of human emotions at absolute peaks...Mr. Preminger, with close and taut direction, keeps you keyed up for disaster all the time. To this structure of pictorial color and dramatic vitality, there is added a musical expression that is possibly the best this fine folk opera has ever had. Under André Previn's direction, the score is magnificently played and sung, with some of the most beautiful communication coming from the choral group...To be sure, there are some flaws in this production...But, for the most part, this is a stunning, exciting and moving film, packed with human emotions and cheerful and mournful melodies. It bids fair to be as much a classic on the screen as it is on the stage."

Harrison's Reports wrote: "It is a superb production in every sense of the word, beautifully photographed in Technicolor and the Todd-AO process, and enhanced by six-track stereophonic sound that serves to make the famed and familiar George Gershwin musical score all the more pleasurable."

Time magazine observed "Porgy and Bess is only a moderate and intermittent success as a musical show; as an attempt to produce a great work of cinematic art, it is a sometimes ponderous failure...On the stage the show has an intimate, itch-and-scratch-it folksiness that makes even the dull spots endearing. On the colossal Todd-AO screen, Catfish Row covers a territory that looks almost as big as a football field, and the action often feels about as intimate as a line play seen from the second tier. What the actors are saying or singing comes blaring out of a dozen stereophonic loudspeakers in such volume that the spectator almost continually feels trapped in the middle of a cheering section. The worst thing about Goldwyn's Porgy, though, is its cinematic monotony. The film is not so much a motion picture as a photographed opera...Still, there are some good things about the show. Sammy Davis Jr., looking like an absurd Harlemization of Chico Marx, makes a wonderfully silly stinker out of Sportin' Life. The singing is generally good—particularly the comic bits by Pearl Bailey and the ballads by Adele Addison...And the color photography gains a remarkable lushness through the use of filters, though in time...the spectator may get tired of the sensation that he is watching the picture through amber-colored sunglasses."

James Baldwin gave a negative review in his essay "On Catfish Row": "Grandiose, foolish, and heavy with the stale perfume of self-congratulation, the Hollywood-Goldwyn-Preminger production of Porgy and Bess lumbered into the Warner theater...[T]he saddest and most infuriating thing about the Hollywood production of Porgy and Bess is that Mr. Otto Preminger has a great many gifted people in front of his camera and not the remotest notion of what to do with any of them...This event, like everything else in the movie, is so tastelessly overdone, so heavily telegraphed—rolling chords, dark sky, wind, ominous talk about hurricane bells, etc.—that there is really nothing left for the actors to do." Baldwin was also critical of the sincerity of a white man directing black actors: "In the case of a white director called upon to direct a Negro cast, the supposition ceases—with very rare exceptions—to have any validity at all. The director cannot know anything about his company if he knows nothing about the life that produced them...Black people still do not, by and large, tell white people the truth and white people still do not want to hear it."

The 1959 press reported the appraisal of Kay Swift: "This is the way George [Gershwin] would have loved to see it." Ira Gershwin's reaction was relayed by producer Samuel Goldwyn: ""Ira Gershwin tells me it is everything he hoped for."

=== Broadcast ===
Porgy and Bess was seen on network television only once — Sunday night, March 5, 1967, on ABC-TV (during a week that additionally saw a rebroadcast of a TV adaptation of Brigadoon and the first telecast of Hal Holbrook's one-man show Mark Twain Tonight!).

The film has not been seen in its entirety on network TV since, although clips have been included on some of the American Film Institute specials. It also had multiple presentations during the 1970s on Los Angeles local television, KTLA-TV, Channel 5, an independent station with access to the Goldwyn Studios output, most likely using the special pan and scan 35mm print which was made for the ABC-TV network presentation, as was KTLA-TV's practice. (Note: KTLA and competitor KHJ-TV telecast 35mm prints in preference to 16mm prints.)

== Unavailability ==
Goldwyn's rights lease was for only 15 years. Following its expiration, the film was unable to be shown without permission of the Gershwin and Heyward estates, and even then only after substantial compensation was paid. Despite repeated requests, the Gershwin estate refused to grant exhibition permission.

Prints are "beyond rare" and have been called "the holy grail of missing movies". Though bootlegs exist, whether a complete, quality print exists was unknown for a considerable period. In 2017, Michael Strunsky, trustee and executor of the Ira Gershwin Musical Estate, told The Hollywood Reporter that Ira Gershwin and his wife, Leonore, viewed the film as a "piece of shit" and directed Goldwyn to destroy all remaining films 20 years after release, as was their right. However, Michael Feinstein, Ira Gershwin's assistant, denies that this ever happened.

In 2007, the film saw a theatrical showing when, on September 26–27, the Ziegfeld Theatre in midtown-Manhattan presented it in its entirety, complete with overture, intermission and exit music, followed by a discussion with Preminger biographer Foster Hirsch. The film was shown twice in New York in 2010 and again in 2019, when it was described by Hirsch as "virtually a lost film."

A digitized version is available for viewing at the Library of Congress.

== Accolades ==
Award	Category	Nominee(s)	Result
Academy Awards	Best Cinematography, Color	Leon Shamroy	Nominated
Academy Awards	Best Costume Design, Color	Irene Sharaff	Nominated
Academy Awards	Best Sound	Samuel Goldwyn Studio Sound Department (Gordon E. Sawyer, Sound Director); Todd-AO Studio Sound Department (Fred Hynes, Sound Director)	Nominated
Academy Awards	Best Music, Scoring of a Motion Picture	André Previn and Ken Darby	Won
Golden Globe Awards	Best Motion Picture – Musical	Samuel Goldwyn	Won
Golden Globe Awards	Best Actor – Musical or Comedy	Sidney Poitier	Nominated
Golden Globe Awards	Best Actress – Musical or Comedy	Dorothy Dandridge	Nominated
Grammy Awards	Best Sound Track Album or Recording of Original Cast From a Motion Picture or Television	André Previn and Ken Darby	Won
Laurel Awards	Top Musical	Samuel Goldwyn	Nominated
Laurel Awards	Top Female Musical Performance	Pearl Bailey	Nominated
Laurel Awards	Top Female Musical Performance	Dorothy Dandridge	Nominated
Laurel Awards	Top Male Musical Performance	Sammy Davis Jr.	Nominated
Writers Guild of America Awards	Best Written American Musical	N. Richard Nash	Nominated

In 2011, Porgy and Bess was deemed "culturally, historically, or aesthetically significant" by the United States Library of Congress and selected for preservation in the National Film Registry. The Registry noted the film's production history, a period when "the civil rights movement gained momentum and a number of African-American actors turned down roles they considered demeaning", but that, over time, it was "now considered an 'overlooked masterpiece' by one contemporary scholar".

== See also ==
- List of American films of 1959
