= A Star Is Born (1954 film) =

Musical drama film by George Cukor

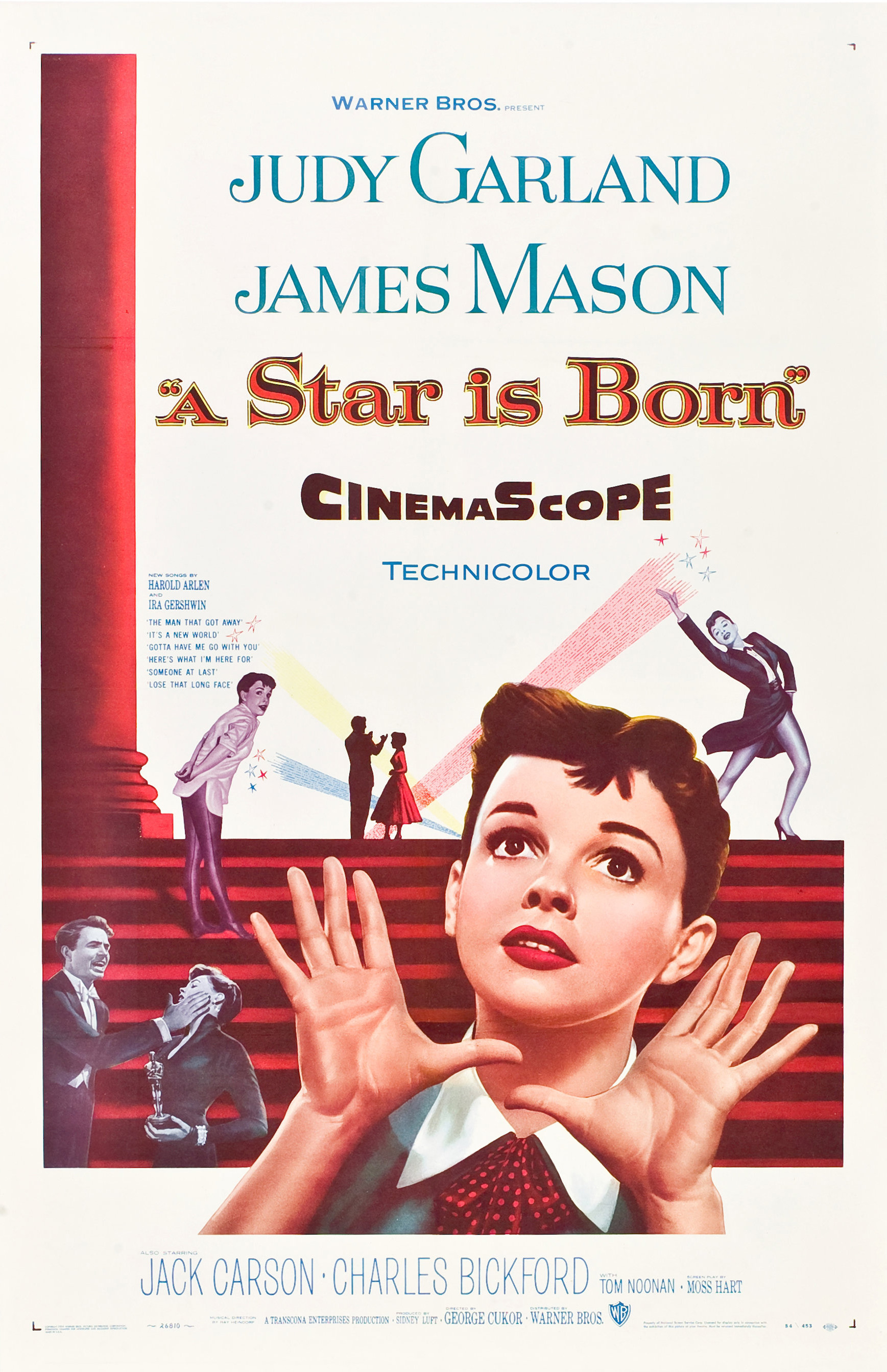
- Theatrical release poster
- Directed by: George Cukor
- Screenplay by: Moss Hart
- Story by: William A. Wellman; Robert Carson (Note: Ben Hecht, Ring Lardner Jr., John Lee Mahin, Budd Schulberg, David O. Selznick and Adela Rogers St. Johns performed uncredited work on the screen story.)
- Based on: A Star Is Born; 1937 film by: William A. Wellman; Robert Carson; Dorothy Parker; Alan Campbell
- Produced by: Sidney Luft
- Starring: Judy Garland; James Mason; Jack Carson; Charles Bickford
- Cinematography: Sam Leavitt
- Edited by: Folmar Blangsted
- Music by: Score: Ray Heindorf; Songs: Harold Arlen (music); Ira Gershwin (lyrics)
- Production company: Transcona Enterprises
- Distributed by: Warner Bros.
- Release date: September 29, 1954 (Pantages Theatre)
- Running time: 182 minutes (premiere); 154 minutes (general release); 178 minutes (restoration)
- Country: United States
- Language: English
- Budget: $5 million
- Box office: $6 million (US/Canada rentals)

A Star Is Born is a 1954 American musical drama film directed by George Cukor, written by Moss Hart, and starring Judy Garland and James Mason. Hart's screenplay is an adaptation of the original 1937 film, based on the original screenplay by Robert Carson, Dorothy Parker and Alan Campbell, and from the same story by William A. Wellman and Carson, with uncredited input from six additional writers—David O. Selznick, Ben Hecht, Ring Lardner Jr., John Lee Mahin, Budd Schulberg and Adela Rogers St. Johns.

It is the second of four official productions of A Star Is Born, with the first in 1937, starring Janet Gaynor and Fredric March; the third in 1976, starring Barbra Streisand and Kris Kristofferson; and the fourth in 2018, starring Lady Gaga and Bradley Cooper.

Garland had not made a film since she had negotiated release from her MGM contract soon after filming began on Royal Wedding in 1950, and Star was promoted heavily as her comeback. For her performance, she was nominated for the Academy Award for Best Actress. Her co-lead, Mason, was also nominated for the Academy Award for Best Actor. This marked the first time that a pair of actors were nominated for the same roles as a previous pair of actors (Gaynor and March in the 1937 original version) for their same respective films.

In 2000, the 1954 film was selected for preservation in the United States National Film Registry by the Library of Congress as being "culturally, historically, or aesthetically significant." It ranked No. 43 on the American Film Institute's 100 Years...100 Passions list in 2002 and No. 7 on its list of greatest musicals in 2006. The song "The Man That Got Away" was ranked No. 11 on AFI's list of 100 top songs in films.

== Plot ==
Esther Blodgett is an aspiring singer with a band, and Norman Maine is a former matinée idol whose career is beginning to decline. When he arrives intoxicated at a function at the Shrine Auditorium, studio publicist Matt Libby attempts to keep him offstage. Norman rushes away and bursts onto a stage where an orchestra is performing, but Esther pretends that he is part of the act.

Realizing that Esther has saved him from public humiliation, Norman invites her to dinner and watches her perform in an after-hours club. He urges her to follow her dream and convinces her she can break into movies. Esther tells Danny McGuire, her bandmate, that she is quitting their gig to pursue movies in LA.

Norman is called away early in the morning. He later hears Esther singing on a television commercial and tracks her down. Studio head Oliver Niles believes Esther is just a passing fancy for the actor but casts her in a small film role when Maine appeals to their friendship.

The studio arbitrarily changes her name to "Vicki Lester", which she finds out when she tries to pick up her paycheck. When Norman persuades Niles to hear "Vicki" sing, she is cast in an important musical film, making her a huge success. Her relationship with Norman flourishes, and they wed.

As Vicki's career continues to grow, Norman finds that his worsening alcoholism has rendered him unemployable. He arrives, late and drunk, in the middle of Vicki's Oscar acceptance speech and starts ranting at the audience for turning their backs on him. When Vicki attempts to calm Norman down, he accidentally strikes her in the face.

Vicki continues working and tells Oliver that Norman has entered a sanitarium. While visiting the racetrack, he runs into Libby, who mocks him for living on Vicki's money. The resulting fight prompts Norman to go on a drinking binge; he is arrested and sentenced to ninety days in jail.

Vicki bails him out and brings him home, where they are joined by Niles. Norman overhears Vicki telling Niles that she will retire from acting to care for him, and Niles retorting that Norman's poor life choices are his alone to bear. Finally realizing what he has done to himself, Vicki, his career, and the people around him, Norman tells Vicki that he is going for a swim, walks into the ocean, and drowns himself.

At Norman's funeral, Vicki is mobbed by reporters and insensitive fans. Despondent, she becomes a recluse. Finally, her old bandmate Danny convinces her to attend a charity function. When she arrives on stage, the master of ceremonies asks her to say a few words to her fans. She says, "Hello, everybody. This is Mrs. Norman Maine", which prompts the crowd into a standing ovation.

== Cast ==
- Judy Garland as Esther Blodgett / Vicki Lester
- James Mason as Norman Maine (Ernest Gubbins)
- Jack Carson as Matt Libby
- Charles Bickford as Oliver Niles
- Tommy Noonan as Danny McGuire
- Amanda Blake as Susan Etting, Premier Radio Host
- Lucy Marlow as Lola Lavery
- Irving Bacon as Graves
- Hazel Shermet as Libby's Secretary
- Timothy Farrell as Bailiff (uncredited)
- Percy Helton as William Gregory (uncredited)
- Nancy Kulp as Esther's neighbor (uncredited)
- Frank Puglia as Bruno (uncredited)
- Strother Martin as Delivery Boy (uncredited)

== Production ==
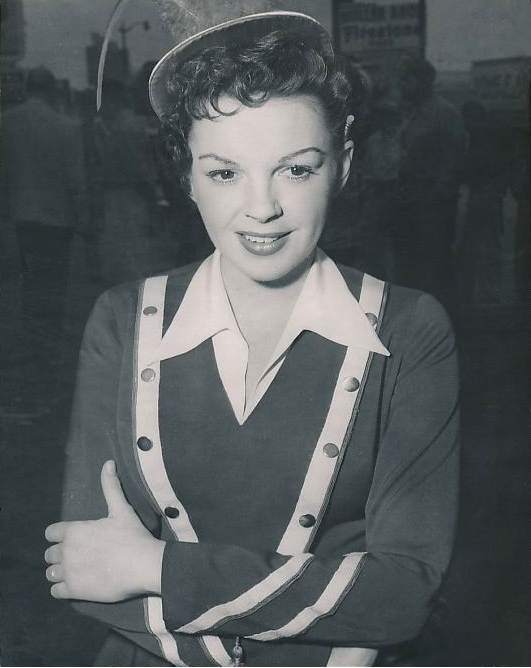
Judy Garland on location filming a scene as a restaurant carhop

In December 1952, George Cukor was approached by Sid Luft, who proposed the director helm a musical remake of the 1937 film A Star Is Born, with his then wife Judy Garland in the lead role. Garland had portrayed Vicki Lester in a December 1942 Lux Radio Theater broadcast with Walter Pidgeon, and she and Luft, along with several associates, had formed Transcona Enterprises specifically to produce the project on screen. Cukor had declined to direct the original film because it was too similar to his 1932 work What Price Hollywood?, but the opportunity to direct his first Technicolor film and first musical, work with screenwriter Moss Hart, and especially with Garland, appealed to him, and he accepted. It was Garland's first film since leaving MGM.

Getting the updated film to the screen proved a challenge. The story is a classic backstage rise and fall of success entertainment, The Dance of Life from 1929 being the genre's premier early example. The scenario by its title demands the fact of stardom for its inclusion in casting. Otherwise the story of personal decline could as well have been portrayed by Oscar Levant, no stranger to the movie musical, and who had worked previously with Jack Carson here playing studio publicist Matt Libby. The greater casting then concerned Cukor and he wanted Cary Grant, whom he had directed three times before, for the male lead, and went so far as to read the entire script with him. Grant, while agreeing it was the role of a lifetime, was more interested in traveling with wife Betsy Drake, and steadfastly refused the role (he also turned down Roman Holiday and Sabrina). He was also concerned about Garland's reputation for unreliability. Cukor never forgave Grant for declining the role. The director then suggested either Humphrey Bogart, Edmond O'Brien, Montgomery Clift or Frank Sinatra for the part, but Jack L. Warner rejected both. Garland suggested John Hodiak, with whom she worked in The Harvey Girls eight years earlier, but he was unavailable. Stewart Granger was the frontrunner for a time, but withdrew when he couldn't adjust to Cukor's habit of acting out scenes as a form of direction. Ultimately, James Mason was signed.

The film was originally announced to be made in 3-D but Warner Bros. Pictures later announced that it was to be made in WarnerSuperScope using Warner's new All-Media camera with no mention of 3-D. Filming began on October 12, 1953. As the months passed, Cukor was forced to deal not only with constant script changes but an unstable leading lady plagued by chemical dependencies, significant weight fluctuations, illnesses, and hypochondria. After eight days of filming, including both standard and CinemaScope versions of "The Man That Got Away", studio executives decided the film should be the first Warner Brothers picture to use CinemaScope.

In March 1954, a rough cut was assembled, still missing several musical numbers, and Cukor had mixed feelings about it. When the last scene was shot in the early morning hours of July 28, 1954, Cukor had already left the production and was unwinding in Europe. The long "Born in a Trunk" sequence was added after Cukor left, supervised by Garland's professional mentor Roger Edens.

The first test screening the following month ran to 196 minutes, and despite ecstatic feedback from the audience, Cukor and editor Folmar Blangsted trimmed it to 182 minutes for its New York premiere that October. The reviews were excellent, but Warner executives, concerned the running time would limit the number of daily showings, made drastic cuts without Cukor, who had departed for India to scout locations for Bhowani Junction. At its final running time of 154 minutes, the film lost two major musical numbers and crucial dramatic scenes; Cukor called it "very painful" to watch.

A Star Is Born cost more than $5 million to produce, making it one Hollywood's most expensive films at the time.

== Release ==
the film's trailer.

On October 22, 1954, it was reported that Warner Bros. had removed 27 minutes from the film, and the new version would be sent back to theaters on November 1.

Following Garland's death in 1969, the uncut film was reissued in Los Angeles and New York.

=== 1983 restoration ===
In October 1981, an Academy tribute to Ira Gershwin was held, in which the musical number "The Man That Got Away" was screened. Following the ceremony, academy president Fay Kinan expressed interest in the removed footage. By courtesy of Warner Bros. studio chairman Robert A. Daly, film preservationist Ronald Haver was granted access into the studio's film vaults. Alongside archivist Don Woodruff and editor Craig Holt, Haver located four minutes of the missing thirty minutes inside a storage facility that belonged to film librarian Merle Ray Harlin, who had been recently convicted of grand theft of motion pictures. Over the course of six months, Haver located more missing scenes, including two complete musical numbers: "Here's What I'm Here For" and "Lose That Long Face". which featured black performers. Additionally, the film's stereophonic soundtrack had been found inside the Burbank sound library. However, seven to eight minutes of matching footage to some of the film's dramatic scenes was never located. Rather than scrap these scenes, a choice was made to intersperse the soundtrack with filtered production stills of these sequences, assembled from the archives.

On July 7, 1983, the reconstructed version (with a runtime of 176 minutes) was screened at the Radio City Music Hall. Those in attendance included James Mason and Garland's daughters Liza Minnelli and Lorna Luft. Cukor had died the night before a special screening of the film was held at the Samuel Goldwyn Theater on January 24, 1983. In the spring of 1984, the restored film was reissued and shown at the Ziegfeld Theatre in New York City. For this engagement, an outtake of Garland's performing "The Man That Got Away" (in a different costume and hairstyle) was included. The same year, when PBS was producing its documentary for Great Performances, Judy Garland: The Concert Years, another small piece of footage was found and shown for the first time in the program: Garland singing "When My Sugar Walks Down the Street", which was deleted from the "Born in a Trunk" sequence.

=== Home media ===
Warner Home Video released the 176-minute 1983 "restored" version on home video in various formats on January 4, 1984. It was released on DVD in letterbox widescreen format on September 19, 2000. The film was digitally remastered from original CinemaScope elements for superior picture clarity and optimal audio vitality and features a remastered English audio soundtrack in Dolby Digital 5.1 and subtitles in English and French. Bonus features include the network telecast of the Hollywood premiere at the Pantages Theatre on September 29, 1954; highlights from the post-premiere party at the Cocoanut Grove; three alternative filmings of "The Man That Got Away" with additional original recording session music; a short musical sequence that appeared in a test screening but was deleted before the film's official premiere, "When My Sugar Walks Down the Street" (which was to be part of the extended "Born in a Trunk" sequence); and the theatrical trailers for this, the 1937 original, and the 1976 remake.

On June 22, 2010, Warner Home Video released the film on Blu-ray and DVD. The release also included supplemental features such as alternate takes, deleted scenes, excerpts from Garland's audio recording sessions, a collectible book of rare photos, press materials, and an essay by film historian John Fricke.

Warner Archive Collection reissued the Blu-ray and DVD on May 14, 2019.

== Reception ==
=== Box office ===
During its initial release, A Star is Born earned $6 million in North American distributor rentals. However, despite its huge popularity, the film failed to make a profit for Warner Brothers due to its excessive cost.

=== Critical reaction ===
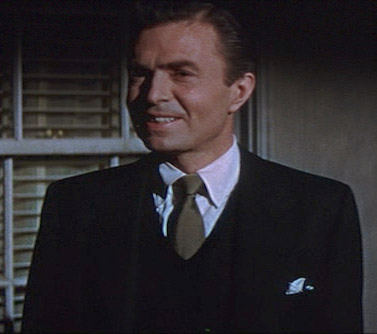
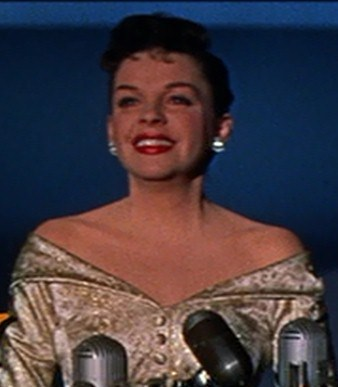
The performances of Mason and, particularly, Garland were universally praised; both earned Academy Award nominations, and each won a Golden Globe Award.

The film received widespread critical acclaim, particularly Cukor's original uncut version; on the review aggregation website Rotten Tomatoes, the film has an approval rating of 98% based on 40 reviews, with an average rating of 8.1/10. The site's critical consensus reads "A Star Is Born is a movie of grand scope and intimate moments, featuring Judy Garland's possibly greatest performance." Bosley Crowther of The New York Times wrote that the film was "one of the grandest heartbreak dramas that has drenched the screen in years." He also added: "The whole thing runs for three hours, and during this extraordinary time a remarkable range of entertainment is developed upon the screen...No one surpasses Mr. Cukor at handling this sort of thing, and he gets performances from Miss Garland and Mr. Mason that make the heart flutter and bleed."

Film critic Pauline Kael mentioned that the film was the "epic of Hollywood's self-sacrifice."

Abel Green, reviewing for Variety, felt the "casting is ideal; the direction sure; the basic ingredients honest and convincing all the way. Miss Garland glitters with that stardust which in the plot the wastrel star James Mason recognizes." Harrison's Reports wrote that "...in addition to being a powerful human-interest drama that frequently tugs at the heartstrings, the picture is studded with nice touches of comedy and vastly entertaining musical interludes that are well-placed and do not interfere with the progress of the story." The paper also applauded Garland's performance, writing she "has never appeared to better advantage than she does in this film; she not only makes the most of her exceptional musical talents, but also endears herself to the audience with her highly sympathetic portrayal of a wholesome young woman..."

Time wrote that Garland "gives what is just about the greatest one-woman show in modern movie history". Jack Moffitt of The Hollywood Reporter described the film as "the perfect blend of drama and musical—of cinematic art and popular entertainment". He furthermore felt "the entire success of the picture depends upon the fact that Judy really has it. Her song styling is as individual and arresting as Ethel Merman's. And, as the picture progresses, she proves it in one smash number after another." Similarly, Newsweek wrote that the film is "best classified as a thrilling personal triumph for Judy Garland... As an actress, Miss Garland is more than adequate. As a mime and comedienne she is even better. But as a singer she can handle anything from torch songs and blues to ballads. In more ways than one, the picture is hers".

=== Accolades ===
When the Oscar for Best Actress went to Grace Kelly instead of Garland, Groucho Marx sent Garland a telegram reading: "Dear Judy, this is the biggest robbery since Brink's".

Award	Category	Nominee(s)	Result	Ref.
Academy Awards	Best Actor	James Mason	Nominated	
Academy Awards	Best Actress	Judy Garland	Nominated	
Academy Awards	Best Art Direction – Color	Art Direction: Malcolm Bert, Gene Allen, and Irene Sharaff; Set Decoration: George James Hopkins	Nominated	
Academy Awards	Best Costume Design – Color	Jean Louis, Mary Ann Nyberg, and Irene Sharaff	Nominated	
Academy Awards	Best Scoring of a Musical Picture	Ray Heindorf	Nominated	
Academy Awards	Best Song	"The Man That Got Away"; Music by Harold Arlen; Lyrics by Ira Gershwin	Nominated	
British Academy Film Awards	Best Foreign Actress	Judy Garland	Nominated	
Directors Guild of America Awards	Outstanding Directorial Achievement in Motion Pictures	George Cukor	Nominated	
Golden Globe Awards	Best Actor in a Motion Picture – Musical or Comedy	James Mason	Won	
Golden Globe Awards	Best Actress in a Motion Picture – Musical or Comedy	Judy Garland	Won	
New York Film Critics Circle Awards	Best Actor	James Mason	Nominated	
New York Film Critics Circle Awards	Best Actress	Judy Garland	Nominated	
Writers Guild of America Awards	Best Written American Musical	Moss Hart	Nominated	

== Soundtrack releases ==
The soundtrack has never been out of print. It was originally released by Columbia Records in 1954 in 10-inch 78 rpm and 12-inch 33 1/3 rpm editions, and also on 7-inch 45 rpm records.

In 1988, Columbia released the soundtrack on compact disc, taking the overture and the main musical numbers directly from the film's stereo soundtrack due to the fact no stereo pre-recordings for the soundtrack master existed for this number.

In 2004, in commemoration of the film's 50th anniversary, Columbia, Legacy Recordings, and Sony Music Soundtrax released a nearly complete, digitally-remastered, expanded edition of the soundtrack. Due to the lack of a complete multitrack version of all songs and score from the film, the CD includes a mix of monaural and stereo elements in order to make as complete a soundtrack as possible.

Because some of the songs were not complete on the film soundtrack, as well as the fact that many of the original music stems had been lost or destroyed subsequent to original mono mixdown, numbers such as "Here's What I'm Here For" and "Lose That Long Face" are taken from the original mono LP masters.

Other numbers such as "Gotta Have Me Go with You" are mostly in stereo, save for brief sections where the mono soundtrack album master was used in order to remove various endemic plot-related sound effects from the track. All of the instrumental tracks are in mono as well due to the fact that the original elements have been lost or destroyed.

The 2004 soundtrack also includes three vocal outtakes – an alternative vocal for the reprise of "It's a New World" that Esther sings while Norman goes for his final swim; "When My Sugar Walks Down the Street", which was intended to be part of the "Born in a Trunk" sequence, but was deleted for time constraints; and "The Trinidad Coconut Oil Shampoo Commercial", which was taken from the only surviving recording of the complete track, a very worn acetate artist reference disc.

In addition, much of the instrumental portion of the 2004 soundtrack contains partial or whole outtakes. This CD also sees the first CD release of the complete version of "Gotta Have Me Go with You" with the full introduction, as well as "The Man That Got Away" with an expanded introduction not used in the original film.

The original Columbia 1954 mono vinyl version of the soundtrack has been released on CD in Britain by Prism Leisure and is available for digital download. This version includes bonus tracks of Judy Garland's Decca recordings of songs from other films.

=== 1954 soundtrack release ===
Ray Heindorf conducting the Warner Bros. Orchestra with arrangements by Skip Martin. All vocals by Judy Garland.

- "Gotta Have Me Go with You" (Harold Arlen and Ira Gershwin)
- "The Man That Got Away" (Arlen and Gershwin)
- "Born in a Trunk" (Roger Edens (music) and Leonard Gershe (lyrics))
- "Swanee" (George Gershwin and Irving Caesar)
- "I'll Get By" (Roy Turk and Fred E. Ahlert)
- "You Took Advantage of Me" (Lorenz Hart and Richard Rodgers)
- "The Black Bottom" (Perry Bradford)
- "The Peanut Vendor" (Moisés Simons)
- "My Melancholy Baby" (Ernie Burnett and George A. Norton)
- "Here's What I'm Here For" (Arlen and Gershwin)
- "It's a New World" (Arlen and Gershwin)
- "Someone at Last" (Arlen and Gershwin)
- "Lose That Long Face" (Arlen and Gershwin)

=== 1988 soundtrack release ===
- "Overture"
- "Gotta Have Me Go with You"
- "The Man That Got Away"
- "Born in a Trunk" Medley
- "Here's What I'm Here For"
- "It's a New World"
- "Someone at Last"
- "Lose That Long Face"

=== 2004 soundtrack release ===
- "Overture"
- "Night of the Stars" (Instrumental)
- "Gotta Have Me Go with You"
- "Norman at Home" (Instrumental)
- "Passion Oriental" (Instrumental)
- "The Man That Got Away"
- "Cheatin' on Me" (Instrumental)
- "I'm Quitting The Band" (Instrumental)
- "The Man That Got Away" (Instrumental)
- "Esther in the Boarding House" (Instrumental)
- "Oliver Niles Studio" (Instrumental)
- "Esther's Awful Makeup" (Instrumental)
- "First Day in the Studio" (Instrumental)
- "Born in a Trunk" Medley
- "Easy Come, Easy Go" (Instrumental)
- "Here's What I'm Here For"
- "The Honeymoon" (Instrumental)
- "It's a New World"
- "Someone at Last"
- "Lose That Long Face"
- "Norman Overhears the Conversation" (Instrumental)
- "It's a New World" (Alternate Take)
- "The Last Swim" (Instrumental)
- "Finale"/"End Credits" (Instrumental)

Bonus Tracks

- "When My Sugar Walks Down the Street"
- "The Trinidad Coconut Oil Shampoo"

=== 2005 soundtrack release ===
- "Gotta Have Me Go with You"
- "The Man That Got Away"
- "Born In a Trunk Medley"
- "Here's What I'm Here For"
- "It's a New World"
- "Someone at Last"
- "Lose That Long Face"

Bonus Tracks (Judy Garland studio recordings for Decca Records)

- "Over the Rainbow" (recorded July 28, 1939)
- "I'm Nobody's Baby" (recorded April 10, 1940)
- "For Me and My Gal" (with Gene Kelly) (recorded July 26, 1942)
- "When You Wore a Tulip (And I Wore a Big Red Rose)" (with Gene Kelly) (recorded July 26, 1942)
- "Have Yourself a Merry Little Christmas" (recorded April 20, 1944)
- "The Boy Next Door" (recorded April 20, 1944)
- "The Trolley Song" (recorded April 20, 1944)
- "Meet Me in St. Louis" (recorded April 21, 1944)
- "On the Atchison, Topeka, and the Santa Fe" (with The Merry Macs) (recorded July 7, 1945)

== Remakes ==
The original film is in the public domain.

- A second remake of A Star Is Born was released in 1976, with Kris Kristofferson and Barbra Streisand.
- Aashiqui 2 is a 2013 Bollywood remake, starring Aditya Roy Kapur and Shraddha Kapoor.
- In 2016, a third remake was announced, directed by Bradley Cooper, starring alongside Lady Gaga, who composed new music for the film. The 2018 adaptation was released to critical acclaim on October 5, 2018.

All four official iterations have been nominated for at least four Academy Awards.

== See also ==
- List of American films of 1954
- List of films cut over the director's opposition
