= Dorothy Cooper =

American screenwriter

- Born: Dorothy Christy Wright; September 30, 1911; Vermillion, South Dakota, U.S.
- Died: November 26, 2004 (aged 93); Palm Desert, California, U.S.
- Education: University of South Dakota
- Occupation: Screenwriter
- Spouses: G. Leslie Cooper; Paul Cerf; Robert Foote

Dorothy Christy Cooper (née Wright; September 30, 1911 – November 26, 2004) was an American screenwriter and television writer active in the 1940s through the 1970s.

== Biography ==
Dorothy was born in Vermillion, South Dakota, to Harry Wright and Jessie Christy. After high school, she attended the University of South Dakota, where she majored in journalism and edited the school's humor magazine, The Wet Hen.

In 1933, after graduation, she moved to Los Angeles, where she got a job working as a telephone operator in Universal City. Four years later, after writing a letter to producer Van Paul, she was offered a job as an extra and then as an assistant script editor. In 1948, she broke into screenwriting with On an Island with You and A Date with Judy.

In the 1950s, she began writing for television. She wrote more than 30 episodes of Father Knows Best and 20 episodes of My Three Sons along with scripts for The Bill Cosby Show and Gidget, among others, having won two Emmys for her work in the medium.

She retired sometime during the 1970s, and died in Palm Desert, California, in 2004.

She was married three times: first to G. Leslie Cooper, second to Paul Cerf, and third to Robert Foote.

== Selected works ==
=== TV ===
- The Bill Cosby Show (1970) (2 episodes)
- The Flying Nun (1967–1969) (4 episodes)
- My Three Sons (1960–1969) (23 episodes)
- The Doris Day Show (1968) (1 episode)
- Love on a Rooftop (1967) (2 episodes)
- Family Affair (1967) (1 episode)
- Gidget (1965–1966) (2 episodes)
- Tammy (1965) (1 episode)
- Hazel (1963–1964) (3 episodes)
- Father Knows Best (1958–1960) (31 episodes)
- The 20th-Century Fox Hour (1 episode)
- Studio 57 (1956) (1 episode)
- The Ford Television Theatre (1954) (1 episode)

=== Film ===
- Flood Tide (1958)
- Let's Be Happy (1957)
- Small Town Girl (1953)
- Rich, Young and Pretty (1951)
- Duchess of Idaho (1950)
- A Date with Judy (1948)
- On an Island with You (1948)
