= Ernest Lehman =

American screenwriter (1915–2005)

- Born: Ernest Paul Lehman; December 8, 1915; New York City, U.S.
- Died: July 2, 2005 (aged 89); Los Angeles, California, U.S.
- Burial place: Westwood Village Memorial Park
- Education: City College of New York (BA)
- Occupations: Screenwriter; producer; director
- Known for: Hello, Dolly! The King and I North by Northwest; Sabrina; The Sound of Music; Sweet Smell of Success; West Side Story; Who's Afraid of Virginia Woolf?
- Spouses: Jacqueline Shapiro (m. 1942; died 1994) Laurie Sherman (m. 1997)
- Children: 3

Ernest Paul Lehman (December 8, 1915 – July 2, 2005) was an American screenwriter and film producer. He was nominated six times for Academy Awards for his screenplays during his career, but did not win. At the 73rd Academy Awards in 2001, he received an Honorary Academy Award in recognition of his achievements and his influential works for the screen. He was the first screenwriter to receive that honor.

He received two Edgar Awards of the Mystery Writers of America for screenplays of suspense films he wrote for director Alfred Hitchcock: North by Northwest (1959), his only original screenplay, and Family Plot (1976), one of numerous adaptations.

== Early life and education ==
Lehman was born in 1915 to Gertrude (Thorn) and Paul E. Lehman. Their Jewish family was based on Long Island. Lehman attended the College of the City of New York (The City College of New York), from which he earned a bachelor's degree.

During World War II he was trained at the New England Radio Institute, then worked as a radio operator for the aviation industry.

== Career ==
After graduation, Lehman started working as a freelance writer. Lehman felt that freelancing was a "very nervous way to make a living", so he began writing copy for a publicity firm that focused on plays and celebrities. He drew from this experience for his novelette, Sweet Smell of Success (1957), on which Clifford Odets based the filmscript for the production team of Hecht-Hill-Lancaster.

Lehman also published many short stories and novellas in magazines such as Colliers, Redbook and Cosmopolitan. These attracted the attention of Hollywood managers, and in the mid-1950s Paramount Pictures signed him to a writing contract. His first film, Executive Suite (1954), was a success.

Lehman was asked to collaborate on the romantic comedy Sabrina (1954), which was released the same year and also became a hit. Some of his most notable works are the screenplay adaptations of the musical West Side Story (1961) and the mega-hit film version of The Sound of Music (1965), another musical. Lehman's work on the screenplay for Sound of Music expanded the stage version to use real locations in Salzburg, having found the Felsenreitschule while location scouting and worked it into the screenplay as the location for the folk festival.

=== Collaboration with Alfred Hitchcock ===
In 1958, Metro-Goldwyn-Mayer had hired Hitchcock to make a film called The Wreck of the Mary Deare, based on Hammond Innes' novel of the same name. Collaborating with Lehman, Hitchcock produced North by Northwest (1959) instead. This was one of Lehman's few original screenplays (rather than adaptations). The film starred Cary Grant as Roger O. Thornhill, a Madison Avenue advertising executive who is mistaken for a government agent by a group of menacing spies (led by James Mason and Martin Landau). Lehman later said he intended North by Northwest to be "the Hitchcock picture to end all Hitchcock pictures." The writing process took Lehman a year, including several periods of writer's block, as well as a trip to Mount Rushmore to do research for the film's climax.

North by Northwest was one of Lehman's greatest triumphs in Hollywood and a huge hit for Hitchcock. For his efforts, Lehman received an Academy Award nomination for Best Original Screenplay, as well as a 1960 Edgar Award from the Mystery Writers of America for Best Motion Picture Screenplay.

=== Other projects ===
In addition to screenwriting, Lehman tried his hand at producing. He was among the few people who initially favored a film adaptation of Edward Albee's play Who's Afraid of Virginia Woolf?. He persuaded studio executive Jack L. Warner to allow him to take on the project, and the film was a critical sensation, garnering many Academy Award nominations. Lehman was also nominated for an Academy Award for producing Hello, Dolly! (1969), starring Barbra Streisand.

In 1972, Lehman directed Portnoy's Complaint, based on the novel by Philip Roth; this was his only directorial work. Later, he earned another Edgar Award for his screenplay for Alfred Hitchcock's final movie, Family Plot (1976).

By 1979, Lehman had stopped writing screenplays, aside from some television projects. He turned down offers to write for Jonathan Demme's The Silence of the Lambs and Brian De Palma's Mission: Impossible. Lehman completed adaptations for two films that were never made: a screenplay for the Noël Coward classic Hay Fever, and one for a musical version of Zorba the Greek. The latter was intended for direction by Robert Wise and starring actors Anthony Quinn and John Travolta.

In 1977, Lehman published the bestselling novel The French Atlantic Affair, about a group of unemployed, middle-class Americans who hijack a French cruise ship for a $35 million ransom. It was adapted as a TV miniseries in 1979.

== Personal life ==
Lehman married Jacqueline Shapiro in 1942. They had two sons, Roger and Alan. Jacqueline died in 1994.

In 1997, Lehman married Laurie Sherman. They had one son, Jonathan, and were married until his death.

=== Amateur radio ===
Lehman held amateur radio callsign K6DXK. He was an active member of the Bel Air Repeater Association.

=== Death ===
Lehman died on July 2, 2005, at UCLA Medical Center after an apparent heart attack. He was buried at the Westwood Village Memorial Park Cemetery in Los Angeles.

== Writing credits ==
=== Filmography ===
- The Inside Story (story) (1948)
- Executive Suite (1954)
- Sabrina (with Billy Wilder & Samuel Taylor) (1954)
- Somebody Up There Likes Me (1956)
- The King and I (1956)
- Sweet Smell of Success (with Clifford Odets) (1957) also story
- North by Northwest (1959)
- From the Terrace (1960)
- West Side Story (1961)
- The Prize (1963)
- The Sound of Music (1965)
- Who's Afraid of Virginia Woolf? (1966)
- Hello, Dolly! (1969)
- Portnoy's Complaint (1972) also director
- Family Plot (1976)
- Black Sunday (with Kenneth Ross and Ivan Moffat) (1977)

=== Television ===
- The Chevrolet Tele-Theatre (1949) writer, one episode
- The Ford Television Theatre (1954) writer, one episode
- Lux Video Theatre (1955) writer, one episode
- Playhouse 90 (1957) writer, one episode
- TV de Vanguarda (1957) based on Sweet Smell of Success
- The French Atlantic Affair (1979) based on his novel

=== Bibliography ===
- Sweet Smell of Success and Other Stories (1957) short stories
- The Comedian and Other Stories (1957) short stories
- The French Atlantic Affair (1977) novel
- Screening Sickness and Other Tales of Tinsel Town (1982) essays
- Farewell Performance (1982) novel

=== Biography ===
- Ernest Lehman: The Sweet Smell of Success (2022) by Jon Krampner

== Accolades ==
Lehman received six Academy Award nominations during his career, but never won. At the 73rd Academy Awards ceremony in 2001, he became the first screenwriter to receive an Honorary Academy Award from the Academy of Motion Picture Arts and Sciences. Lehman did, however, receive more honorable recognition from the Writers Guild of America than any other screenwriter in film history.

Award	Date of ceremony	Category	Film	Result
Academy Award	1955	Best Adapted Screenplay	Sabrina (shared with Billy Wilder and Samuel A. Taylor); Lost to George Seaton for The Country Girl	Nominated
Academy Award	1960	Best Original Screenplay	North by Northwest; Lost to Russell Rouse, Clarence Greene, Stanley Shapiro, and Maurice Richlin for Pillow Talk	Nominated
Academy Award	1962	Best Adapted Screenplay	West Side Story; Lost to Abby Mann for Judgment at Nuremberg	Nominated
Academy Award	1967	Best Picture	Who's Afraid of Virginia Woolf? Lost to Fred Zinnemann for A Man for All Seasons	Nominated
Academy Award	1967	Best Adapted Screenplay	Who's Afraid of Virginia Woolf? Lost to Robert Bolt for A Man for All Seasons	Nominated
Academy Award	1970	Best Picture	Hello, Dolly! Lost to Jerome Hellman for Midnight Cowboy	Nominated
Academy Award	2001	Academy Honorary Award	"in appreciation of a body of varied and enduring work."	Honorary
Golden Globe Award	1955	Best Screenplay – Motion Picture	Sabrina (shared with Billy Wilder and Samuel A. Taylor)	Won
Golden Globe Award	1967	Best Motion Picture – Drama	Who's Afraid of Virginia Woolf? Lost to Fred Zinnemann for A Man for All Seasons	Nominated
Golden Globe Award	1967	Best Screenplay – Motion Picture	Who's Afraid of Virginia Woolf? Lost to Robert Bolt for A Man for All Seasons	Nominated
Golden Globe Award	1970	Best Motion Picture – Musical or Comedy	Hello, Dolly! Lost to Stanley Kramer and George Glass for The Secret of Santa Vittoria	Nominated
Edgar Allan Poe Award	1960	Best Motion Picture Screenplay	North by Northwest	Won
Edgar Allan Poe Award	1977	Best Motion Picture Screenplay	Family Plot	Won
Edgar Allan Poe Award	1978	Best Motion Picture Screenplay	Black Sunday (shared with Kenneth Ross and Ivan Moffat); Lost to Robert Benton for The Late Show	Nominated
Writers Guild of America Award	1955	Best Written American Comedy	Sabrina (shared with Billy Wilder and Samuel A. Taylor)	Won
Writers Guild of America Award	1955	Best Written American Drama	Executive Suite; Lost to Budd Schulberg for On the Waterfront	Nominated
Writers Guild of America Award	1957	Best Written American Drama	Somebody Up There Likes Me; Lost to Michael Wilson for Friendly Persuasion	Nominated
Writers Guild of America Award	1957	Best Written American Musical	The King and I	Won
Writers Guild of America Award	1960	Best Written American Comedy	North by Northwest; Lost to Billy Wilder and I. A. L. Diamond for Some Like It Hot	Nominated
Writers Guild of America Award	1962	Best Written American Musical	West Side Story	Won
Writers Guild of America Award	1966	Best Written American Musical	The Sound of Music	Won
Writers Guild of America Award	1967	Best Written American Drama	Who's Afraid of Virginia Woolf?	Won
Writers Guild of America Award	1972	Laurel Award for Screenwriting Achievement		Honorary
Writers Guild of America Award	1977	Best Comedy Adapted from Another Medium	Family Plot; Lost to Blake Edwards and Frank Waldman for The Pink Panther Strikes Again	Nominated
