= 18th Academy Awards =

- Date: March 7, 1946
- Site: Grauman's Chinese Theatre, Hollywood, California, USA
- Hosted by: James Stewart; Bob Hope

Highlights
- Best Picture: The Lost Weekend
- Most awards: The Lost Weekend (4)
- Most nominations: The Bells of St. Mary's (8)

The 18th Academy Awards were held on March 7, 1946, at Grauman's Chinese Theatre to honor the films of 1945. Being the first Oscars after the end of World War II, the ceremony returned to the glamour of the prewar years; notably, the plaster statuettes that had been used during the war were replaced by bronze statuettes with gold plating and an elevated base.

Despite the optimistic postwar mood, director Billy Wilder's grim and socially significant drama The Lost Weekend won the major awards of Best Picture and Best Director, as well as two other awards. It was the first film to win both Best Picture and the Palme d'Or at the Cannes Film Festival. Best Actress nominee Joan Crawford was absent due to illness.

This was the first year in which every film nominated for Best Picture won at least one Oscar, and also the first time a sequel (The Bells of St. Mary's) was nominated for Best Picture.

== Winners and nominees ==
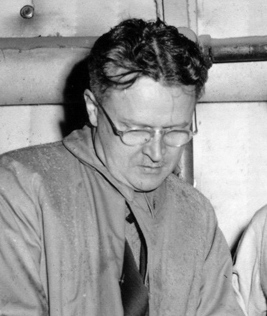
Charles Brackett; Best Picture winner and Best Screenplay co-winner

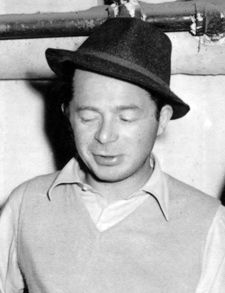
Billy Wilder; Best Director winner and Best Screenplay co-winner

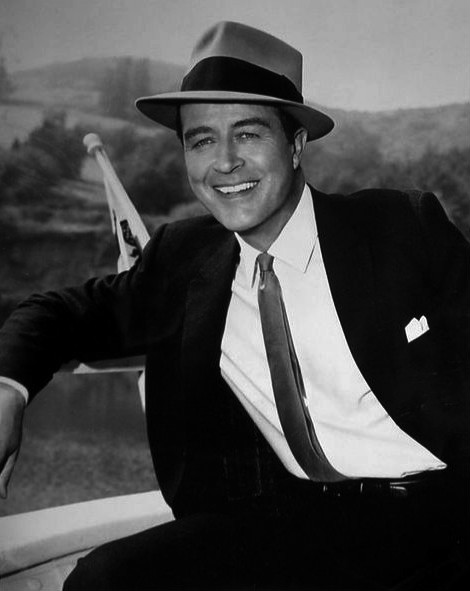
Ray Milland; Best Actor winner

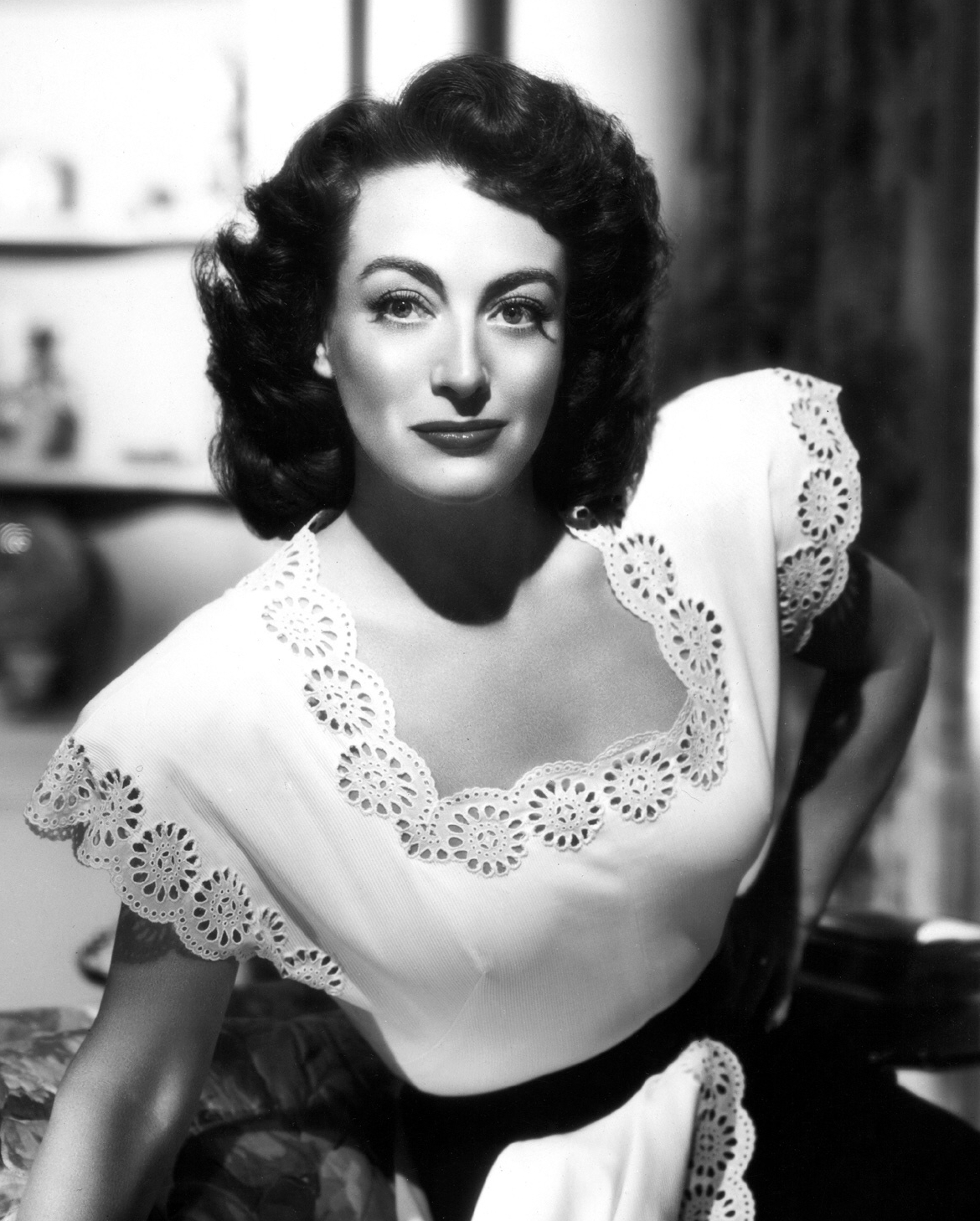
Joan Crawford; Best Actress winner

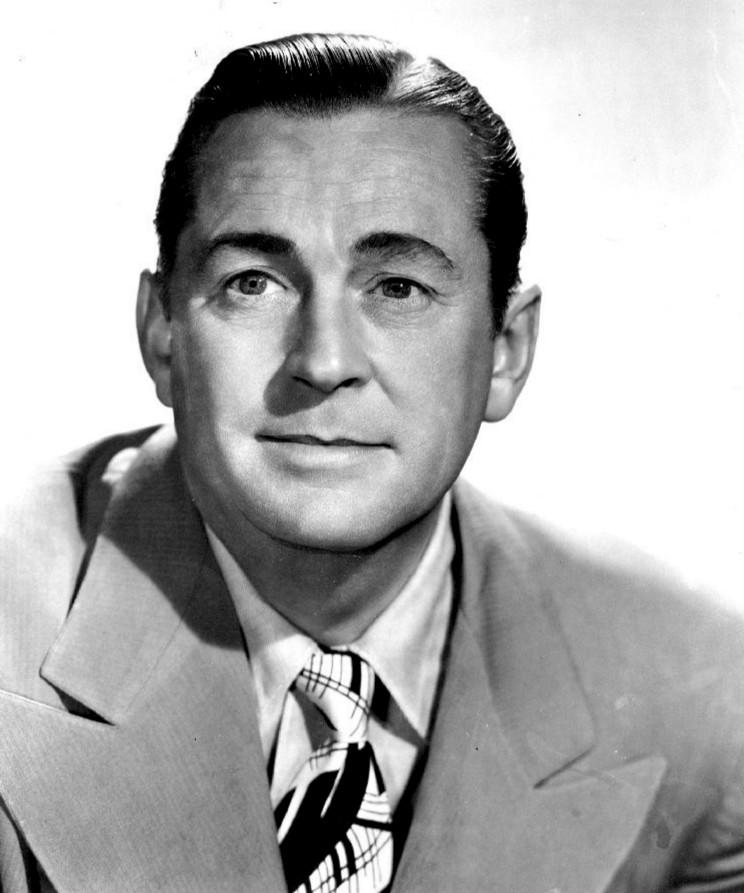
James Dunn; Best Supporting Actor winner

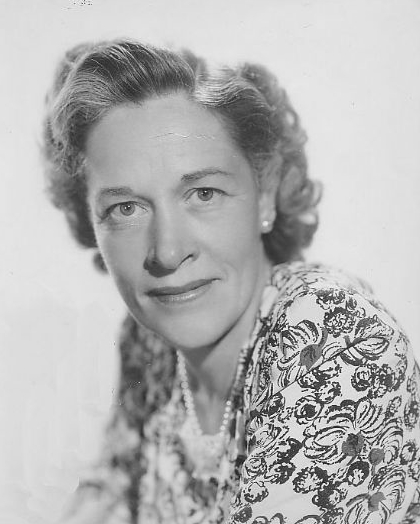
Anne Revere; Best Supporting Actress winner

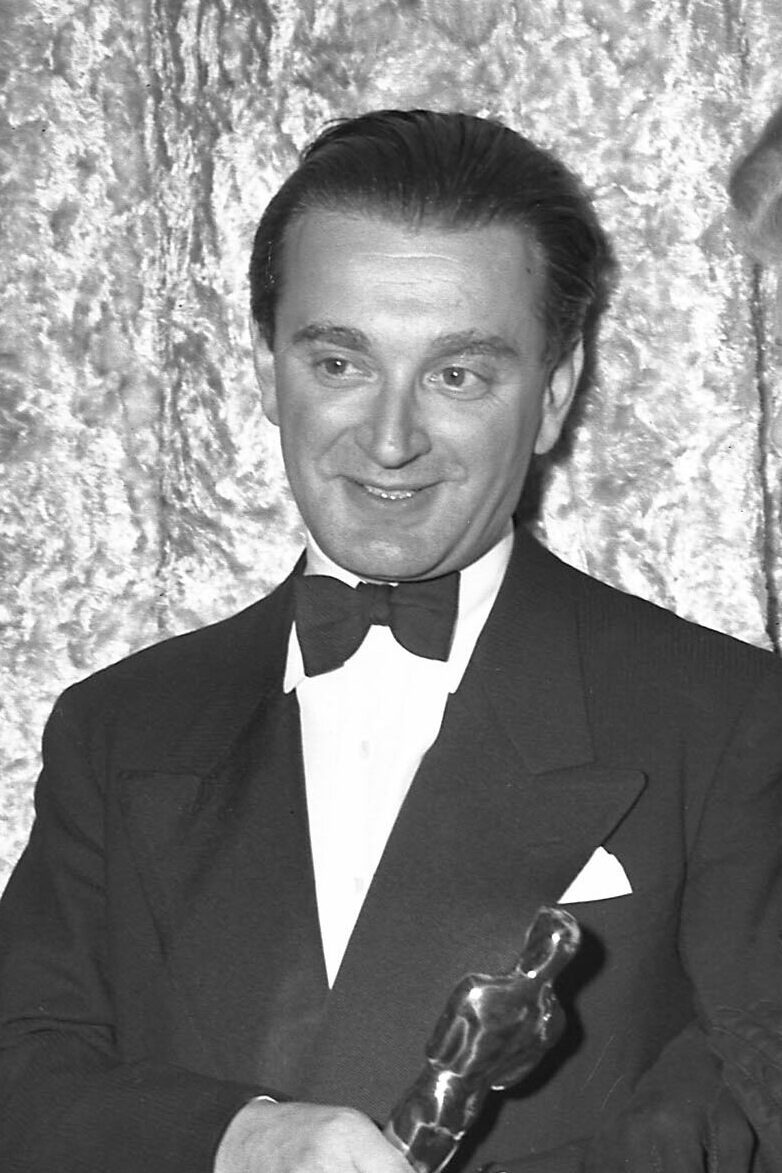
Miklós Rózsa; Best Scoring of a Dramatic or Comedy Picture

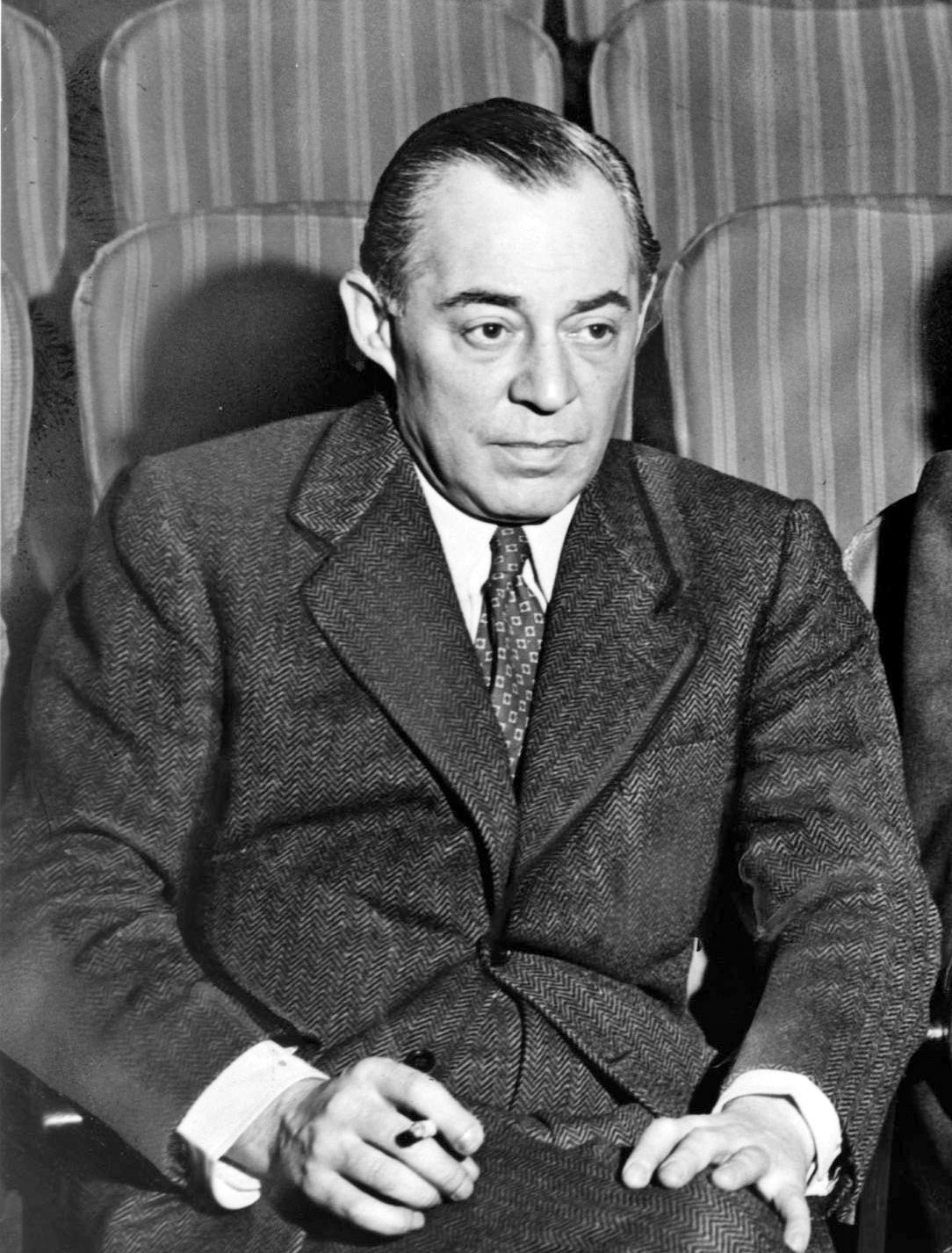
Richard Rodgers; Best Original Song co-winner

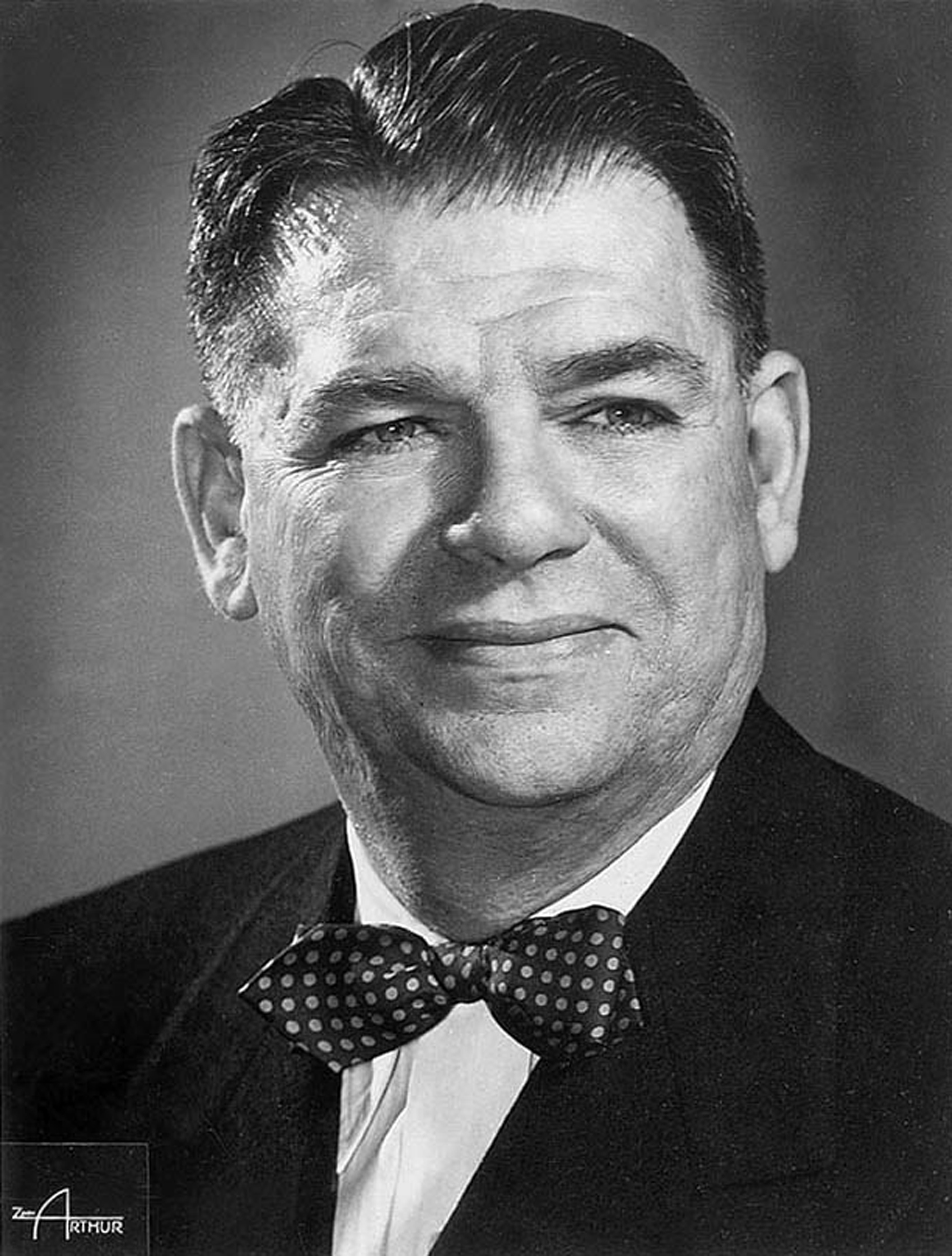
Oscar Hammerstein II; Best Original Song co-winner

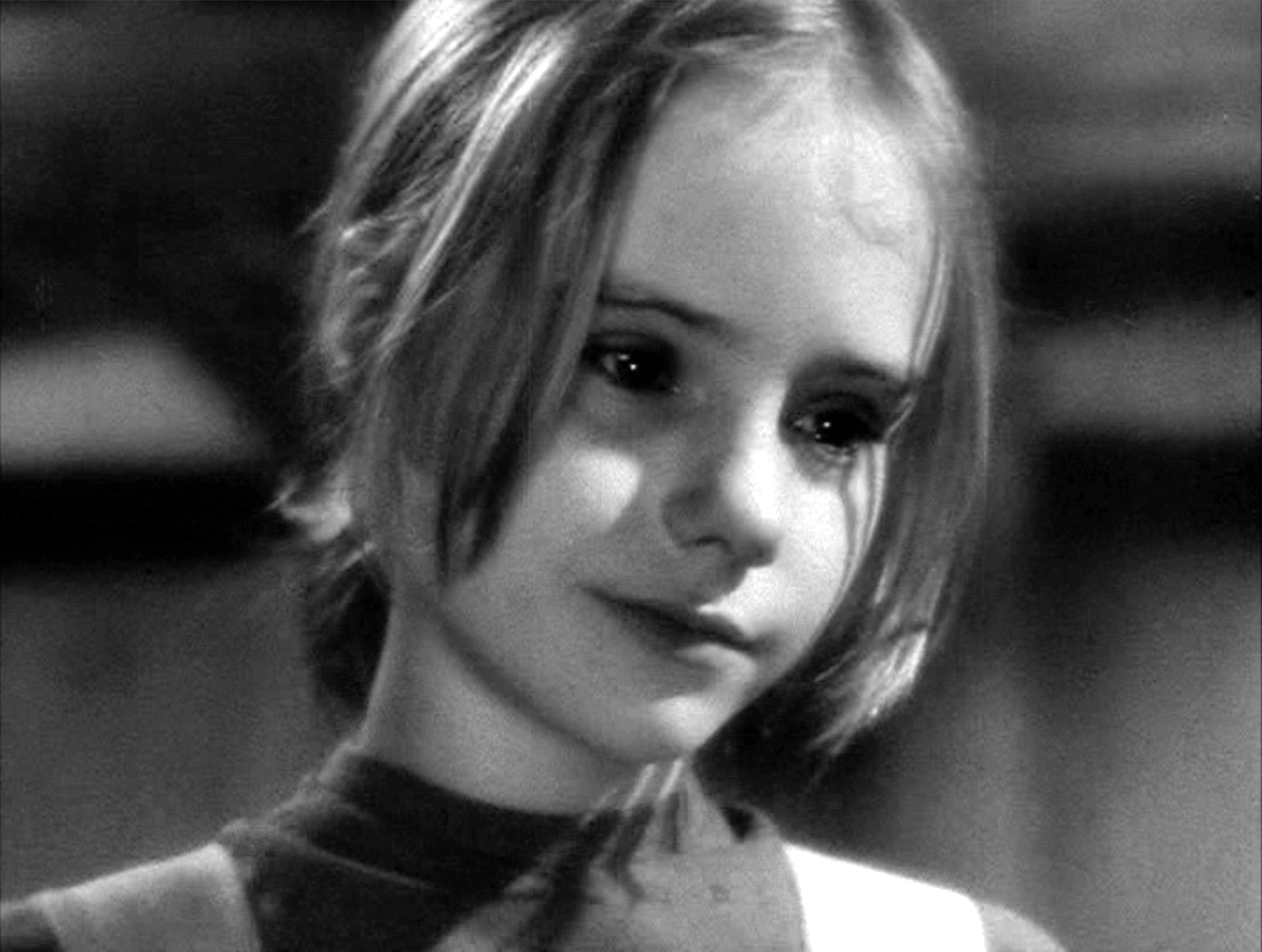
Peggy Ann Garner; Juvenile Academy Award recipient

=== Awards ===
Nominations announced on January 27, 1946. Winners are listed first and highlighted in boldface.

**Best Motion Picture**: **The Lost Weekend – Charles Brackett for Paramount Pictures**; Anchors Aweigh – Joe Pasternak for Metro-Goldwyn-Mayer; The Bells of St. Mary's – Leo McCarey for RKO Radio Pictures; Mildred Pierce – Jerry Wald for Warner Bros.; Spellbound – David O. Selznick for United Artists	**Best Directing**: **Billy Wilder – The Lost Weekend**; Leo McCarey – The Bells of St. Mary's; Clarence Brown – National Velvet; Jean Renoir – The Southerner; Alfred Hitchcock – Spellbound
**Best Actor**: **Ray Milland – The Lost Weekend as Don Birnam**; Bing Crosby – The Bells of St. Mary's as Father Chuck O'Malley; Gene Kelly – Anchors Aweigh as Joseph "Joe" Brady; Gregory Peck – The Keys of the Kingdom as Father Francis Chisholm; Cornel Wilde – A Song to Remember as Frédéric Chopin	**Best Actress**: **Joan Crawford – Mildred Pierce as Mildred Pierce Beragon**; Ingrid Bergman – The Bells of St. Mary's as Sister Mary Benedict; Greer Garson – The Valley of Decision as Mary Rafferty; Jennifer Jones – Love Letters as Singleton/Victoria Morland; Gene Tierney – Leave Her to Heaven as Ellen Berent Harland
**Best Actor in a Supporting Role**: **James Dunn – A Tree Grows in Brooklyn as Johnny Nolan**; Michael Chekhov – Spellbound as Dr Alexander "Alex" Brulov; John Dall – The Corn Is Green as Morgan Evans; Robert Mitchum – The Story of G.I. Joe as Bill Walker; J. Carrol Naish – A Medal for Benny as Charley Martin	**Best Actress in a Supporting Role**: **Anne Revere – National Velvet as Mrs Araminty Brown**; Eve Arden – Mildred Pierce as Ida Corwin; Ann Blyth – Mildred Pierce as Veda Pierce Forrester; Angela Lansbury – The Picture of Dorian Gray as Sibyl Vane; Joan Lorring – The Corn Is Green as Bessie Watty
**Best Writing (Original Motion Picture Story)**: **The House on 92nd Street – Charles G. Booth**; The Affairs of Susan – László Görög and Thomas Monroe; A Medal for Benny – John Steinbeck and Jack Wagner; Objective, Burma! – Alvah Bessie; A Song to Remember – Ernst Marischka	**Best Writing (Original Screenplay)**: **Marie-Louise – Richard Schweizer**; Dillinger – Philip Yordan; Music for Millions – Myles Connolly; Salty O'Rourke – Milton Holmes; What Next, Corporal Hargrove? – Harry Kurnitz
**Best Writing (Screenplay)**: **The Lost Weekend – Charles Brackett and Billy Wilder from The Lost Weekend by Charles R. Jackson**; Mildred Pierce – Ranald MacDougall from Mildred Pierce by James M. Cain; Pride of the Marines – Albert Maltz from Al Schmid, Marine by Roger Butterfield; The Story of G.I. Joe – Leopold Atlas, Guy Endore and Philip Stevenson from Brave Men and Here Is Your War by Ernie Pyle; A Tree Grows in Brooklyn – Frank Davis and Tess Slesinger (posthumous nomination) from A Tree Grows in Brooklyn by Betty Smith	**Best Documentary (Feature)**: **The True Glory – Government of the United Kingdom and Federal government of the United States**; The Last Bomb – United States Army Air Force
**Best Documentary (Short Subject)**: **Hitler Lives – Gordon Hollingshead**; Library of Congress – United States Office of War Information Overseas Motion Picture Bureau; To the Shores of Iwo Jima – United States Marine Corps	**Best Short Subject (One-Reel)**: **Stairway to Light – Herbert Moulton and Jerry Bresler**; Along the Rainbow Trail – Edmund Reek; Screen Snapshots' 25th Anniversary – Ralph Staub; Story of a Dog – Gordon Hollingshead; White Rhapsody – Grantland Rice; Your National Gallery – Joseph O'Brien (posthumous nomination) and Thomas Mead
**Best Short Subject (Two-Reel)**: **Star in the Night – Gordon Hollingshead**; A Gun in His Hand – Chester Franklin and Jerry Bresler; The Jury Goes Round 'N' Round – Jules White; The Little Witch – George Templeton	**Best Short Subject (Cartoon)**: **Quiet Please! – Frederick Quimby**; Donald's Crime – Walt Disney; Jasper and the Beanstalk – George Pal; Life with Feathers – Edward Selzer; Mighty Mouse in Gypsy Life – Paul Terry; The Poet and Peasant – Walter Lantz; Rippling Romance – Screen Gems
**Best Music (Music Score of a Dramatic or Comedy Picture)**: **Spellbound – Miklós Rózsa**; The Bells of St. Mary's – Robert Emmett Dolan; Brewster's Millions – Lou Forbes; Captain Kidd – Werner Janssen; The Enchanted Cottage – Roy Webb; Flame of Barbary Coast – Dale Butts and Morton Scott; G. I. Honeymoon – Edward J. Kay; Guest in the House – Werner Janssen; Guest Wife – Daniele Amfitheatrof; The Keys of the Kingdom – Alfred Newman; The Lost Weekend – Miklós Rózsa; Love Letters – Victor Young; The Man Who Walked Alone – Karl Hajos; Objective, Burma! – Franz Waxman; Paris Underground – Alexandre Tansman; A Song to Remember – Miklós Rózsa and Morris Stoloff; The Southerner – Werner Janssen; The Story of G.I. Joe – Louis Applebaum and Ann Ronell; This Love of Ours – H. J. Salter; The Valley of Decision – Herbert Stothart; The Woman in the Window – Hugo Friedhofer and Arthur Lange	**Best Music (Scoring of a Musical Picture)**: **Anchors Aweigh – Georgie Stoll**; Belle of the Yukon – Arthur Lange; Can't Help Singing – Jerome Kern (posthumous nomination) and H. J. Salter; Hitchhike to Happiness – Morton Scott; Incendiary Blonde – Robert Emmett Dolan; Rhapsody in Blue – Ray Heindorf and Max Steiner; State Fair – Charles Henderson and Alfred Newman; Sunbonnet Sue – Edward J. Kay; The Three Caballeros – Edward H. Plumb, Paul J. Smith and Charles Wolcott; Tonight and Every Night – Marlin Skiles and Morris Stoloff; Why Girls Leave Home – Walter Greene; Wonder Man – Lou Forbes and Ray Heindorf
**Best Music (Song)**: **"It Might as Well Be Spring" from State Fair – Music by Richard Rodgers; Lyrics by Oscar Hammerstein II**; "Accentuate the Positive" from Here Come the Waves – Music by Harold Arlen; Lyrics by Johnny Mercer; "Anywhere" from Tonight and Every Night – Music by Jule Styne; Lyrics by Sammy Cahn; "Aren't You Glad You're You?" from The Bells of St. Mary's – Music by James Van Heusen; Lyrics by Johnny Burke; "The Cat and the Canary" from Why Girls Leave Home – Music by Jay Livingston; Lyrics by Ray Evans; "Endlessly" from Earl Carroll Vanities – Music by Walter Kent; Lyrics by Kim Gannon; "I Fall in Love Too Easily" from Anchors Aweigh – Music by Jule Styne; Lyrics by Sammy Cahn; "I'll Buy That Dream" from Sing Your Way Home – Music by Allie Wrubel; Lyrics by Herb Magidson; "Linda" from The Story of G.I. Joe – Music and Lyrics by Ann Ronell; "Love Letters" from Love Letters – Music by Victor Young; Lyrics by Edward Heyman; "More and More" from Can't Help Singing – Music by Jerome Kern (posthumous nomination); Lyrics by E. Y. Harburg; "Sleighride in July" from Belle of the Yukon – Music by James Van Heusen; Lyrics by Johnny Burke; "So in Love" from Wonder Man – Music by David Rose; Lyrics by Leo Robin; "Some Sunday Morning" from San Antonio – Music by Ray Heindorf and M. K. Jerome; Lyrics by Ted Koehler	**Best Sound Recording**: **The Bells of St. Mary's – Stephen Dunn**; Flame of Barbary Coast – Daniel J. Bloomberg; Lady on a Train – Bernard B. Brown; Leave Her to Heaven – Thomas T. Moulton; Rhapsody in Blue – Nathan Levinson; A Song to Remember – John P. Livadary; The Southerner – Jack Whitney; They Were Expendable – Douglas Shearer; The Three Caballeros – C. O. Slyfield; Three Is a Family – W. V. Wolfe; The Unseen – Loren L. Ryder; Wonder Man – Gordon E. Sawyer
**Best Art Direction (Black-and-White)**: **Blood on the Sun – Art Direction: Wiard Ihnen; Interior Decoration: A. Roland Fields**; Experiment Perilous – Art Direction: Albert S. D'Agostino and Jack Okey; Interior Decoration: Darrell Silvera and Claude E. Carpenter; The Keys of the Kingdom – Art Direction: James Basevi and William S. Darling; Interior Decoration: Thomas Little and Frank E. Hughes; Love Letters – Art Direction: Hans Dreier and Roland Anderson; Interior Decoration: Samuel M. Comer and Ray Moyer; The Picture of Dorian Gray – Art Direction: Cedric Gibbons and Hans Peters; Interior Decoration: Edwin B. Willis, John Bonar and Hugh Hunt	**Best Art Direction (Color)**: **Frenchman's Creek – Art Direction: Hans Dreier and Ernst Fegté; Interior Decoration: Samuel M. Comer**; Leave Her to Heaven – Art Direction: Lyle R. Wheeler and Maurice Ransford; Interior Decoration: Thomas Little; National Velvet – Art Direction: Cedric Gibbons and Urie McCleary; Interior Decoration: Edwin B. Willis and Mildred Griffiths; San Antonio – Art Direction: Ted Smith; Interior Decoration: Jack McConaghy; A Thousand and One Nights – Art Direction: Stephen Goosson and Rudolph Sternad; Interior Decoration: Frank Tuttle
**Best Cinematography (Black-and-White)**: **The Picture of Dorian Gray – Harry Stradling**; The Keys of the Kingdom – Arthur C. Miller; The Lost Weekend – John F. Seitz; Mildred Pierce – Ernest Haller; Spellbound – George Barnes	**Best Cinematography (Color)**: **Leave Her to Heaven – Leon Shamroy**; Anchors Aweigh – Robert Planck and Charles P. Boyle; National Velvet – Leonard Smith; A Song to Remember – Tony Gaudio and Allen M. Davey (posthumous nomination); The Spanish Main – George Barnes
**Best Film Editing**: **National Velvet – Robert J. Kern**; The Bells of St. Mary's – Harry Marker; The Lost Weekend – Doane Harrison; Objective, Burma! – George Amy; A Song to Remember – Charles Nelson	**Best Special Effects**: **Wonder Man – Photographic Effects: John P. Fulton; Sound Effects: Arthur Johns**; Captain Eddie – Photographic Effects: Fred Sersen and Sol Halperin; Sound Effects: Roger Heman Sr. and Harry M. Leonard; Spellbound – Photographic Effects: Jack Cosgrove; They Were Expendable – Photographic Effects: A. Arnold Gillespie, Donald Jahraus and R. A. MacDonald; Sound Effects: Michael Steinore; A Thousand and One Nights – Photographic Effects: Lawrence W. Butler; Sound Effects: Ray Bomba

=== Special awards ===
- To Walter Wanger for his six years service as President of the Academy of Motion Picture Arts and Sciences.
- To Peggy Ann Garner, outstanding child actress of 1945.
- To The House I Live In, tolerance short subject; produced by Frank Ross and Mervyn LeRoy; directed by Mervyn LeRoy; screenplay by Albert Maltz; song "The House I Live In", music by Earl Robinson, lyrics by Lewis Allan; starring Frank Sinatra; released by RKO Radio.
- To Republic Studio, Daniel J. Bloomberg and the Republic Studio Sound Department for the building of an outstanding musical scoring auditorium which provides optimum recording conditions and combines all elements of acoustic and engineering design.

== Presenters and performers ==
=== Presenters ===
- Ingrid Bergman (Presenter: Best Actor)
- Charles Boyer (Presenter: Best Actress)
- Frank Capra (Presenter: Best Film Editing, Best Sound Recording and Best Special Effects)
- Bette Davis (Presenter: Writing Awards)
- Y. Frank Freeman (Presenter: Short Subject Awards)
- D. W. Griffith (Presenter: Best Cinematography)
- Van Heflin (Presenter: Best Supporting Actress and Best Supporting Actor)
- Eric Johnston (Presenter: Best Picture)
- George Murphy (Presenter: Honorary Award to Peggy Ann Garner)
- Donald Nelson (Presenter: Honorary Awards)
- Ginger Rogers (Presenter: Best Art Direction)
- Cesar Romero and Peter Viertel (Presenters: Show Introduction)
- William Wyler (Presenter: Best Director)

=== Performers ===
- Kathryn Grayson
- Dick Haymes
- Dinah Shore
- Frank Sinatra

== Multiple nominations and awards ==
Films with multiple nominations
Nominations	Film
8	The Bells of St. Mary's
7	The Lost Weekend
6	Mildred Pierce
6	A Song to Remember
6	Spellbound
5	Anchors Aweigh
5	National Velvet
4	The Keys of the Kingdom
4	Leave Her to Heaven
4	Love Letters
4	The Story of G.I. Joe
4	Wonder Man
3	Objective, Burma!
3	The Picture of Dorian Gray
3	The Southerner
2	Belle of the Yukon
2	Can't Help Singing
2	The Corn Is Green
2	Flame of Barbary Coast
2	A Medal for Benny
2	Rhapsody in Blue
2	San Antonio
2	State Fair
2	They Were Expendable
2	A Thousand and One Nights
2	The Three Caballeros
2	Tonight and Every Night
2	A Tree Grows in Brooklyn
2	The Valley of Decision
2	Why Girls Leave Home

Films with multiple awards
Awards	Film
4	The Lost Weekend
2	National Velvet

== See also ==
- 3rd Golden Globe Awards
- 1945 in film
