= Ray Bomba =

American sound editor (1907–1986)

- Born: February 14, 1907; Beeville, Texas, USA
- Died: June 24, 1986 (aged 79); Encino, California, USA
- Occupation: Sound editor
- Years active: 1945-1959

Ray Bomba (February 14, 1907 – June 24, 1986) was an American sound editor who was nominated during the 18th Academy Awards for the film A Thousand and One Nights in the category of Best Special Effects. His nomination was shared with Lawrence W. Butler.

== Filmography ==
- The Man Who Understood Women (1959)
- The Roots of Heaven (1958)
- Sing, Boy, Sing (1958)
- The Three Faces of Eve (1957)
- Will Success Spoil Rock Hunter? (1957)
- Bigger Than Life (1956)
- On the Threshold of Space (1956)
- The Girl in the Red Velvet Swing (1955)
- How to Be Very, Very Popular (1955)
- Love Is a Many-Splendored Thing (1955)
- The Rains of Ranchipur (1955)
- Soldier of Fortune (1955)
- Broken Lance (1954)
- Désirée (1954)
- There's No Business Like Show Business (1954)
- A Thousand and One Nights (1945)
