= The Living Christ Series =

1951 film

- Directed by: John T. Coyle
- Written by: Arthur T. Horman
- Produced by: James K. Friedrich
- Starring: Robert Wilson; William "Bill" Henry; Tyler McVey; Lawrence Dobkin; Robert Bice; Michael Whalen; Lowell Gilmore; Eileen Rowe; Art Gilmore
- Cinematography: Frederick E. West
- Music by: Irving Gertz
- Release date: 1951
- Running time: 344 minutes
- Country: United States
- Language: English

The Living Christ Series is a 12-part drama television series about the life of Jesus Christ. It was released in 1951 and directed by John T. Coyle.

== Plot ==
A television mini-series told the life of Christ in a version of the typical Hollywood serial film. Each episode ran for thirty minutes, bringing the total running time of the series to six hours. Filmed in color in 1951, it is notable as one of the few American productions of the period to depict Christ’s face on screen.

Since the early years of sound cinema, American filmmakers had generally avoided showing Christ directly, fearing that audiences might be alienated if the actor did not match their expectations. As a result, the figure was typically shown only from behind, in long shots, or represented by partial views such as a hand.

Foreign film makers, however, had no such doubts, and Christ was actually shown in such films as the French Golgotha (1935), the Mexican El Martir del Calvario (1952), and the 1953 British serial Jesus of Nazareth.

However, The Living Christ Series was not meant to be shown in movie theatres, but more as an instructional, inspirational film in churches or on Sunday-morning television. Far from being a religious epic, the series was clearly shot mostly on soundstages and on a low budget, much like a typical television program of the era shot on film. Directed by John T. Coyle, the series featured mostly unknown actors or actors who appeared mostly in B-films. A notable exception was Lowell Gilmore, who played Pontius Pilate, and whose most famous previous role was as Basil Hallward in MGM's classic 1945 film The Picture of Dorian Gray. Character actor Lawrence Dobkin also appeared in the series, and Will Wright, perhaps most famous for appearing as Ben Weaver on several episodes of The Andy Griffith Show, was cast as Herod. Martin Balsam also plays a small role. Screen unknown Robert Wilson, who would go on to practically make a career out of playing the role, portrayed Christ. Noted movie trailer announcer Art Gilmore served as narrator.

The Living Christ Series, like other similar religiously themed films, was released by Cathedral Films. It has been released on VHS and DVD, both in separate volumes and in a boxed set.

== Cast ==
- Art Gilmore - Narrator
- Robert Wilson - Jesus
- William Henry - Andrew
- Tyler McVey - Simon Peter
- Robert Bice - Matthew
- Lawrence Dobkin - Caiaphas
- Michael Whalen - Simon the Zealot
- Lowell Gilmore - Pontius Pilate
- Eileen Rowe - Mary the mother
