= 1946 Academy Awards =

1946 Academy Awards may refer to:

- 18th Academy Awards, the Academy Awards ceremony that took place in 1946
- 19th Academy Awards, the 1947 ceremony honoring the best in film for 1946
