= The Great Jewel Robber =

1950 film by Peter Godfrey

- Theatrical release poster
- Directed by: Peter Godfrey
- Screenplay by: Borden Chase
- Produced by: Bryan Foy
- Starring: David Brian; Marjorie Reynolds; John Archer; Jacqueline deWit; Perdita Chandler; Stanley Church
- Cinematography: Sidney Hickox
- Edited by: Frank Magee
- Music by: William Lava
- Production company: Warner Bros. Pictures
- Distributed by: Warner Bros. Pictures
- Release dates: July 15, 1950; August 3, 1950 (New York)
- Running time: 91 minutes
- Country: United States
- Language: English

The Great Jewel Robber is a 1950 American fictionalized biographical film directed by Peter Godfrey and written by Borden Chase. The film stars David Brian, Marjorie Reynolds, John Archer, Jacqueline deWit, Perdita Chandler, and Stanley W. Church (Mayor of New Rochelle, New York, playing himself). It is based on the life of Gerard Dennis, a "society thief" who stole more than $600,000 worth of jewels.

== Plot ==
Narrated in part by David Brian as Gerard Dennis, the film follows his criminal career targeting the homes of wealthy and famous socialites and movie stars, stealing mostly jewels and furs, from Toronto, Canada to New Rochelle, New York to Beverly Hills, California.

In Toronto, Marion Blaine, a naive young woman, is in love with Dennis, unaware of his criminal activities until he is exposed by her father, who turns Dennis in to the police. Dennis is able to escape from a prison work detail and make his way back to Marion, promising to marry her and go to the United States if she can raise money for the journey. Once he receives the money, however, he abandons Marion and takes off to the border with another woman, Peggy Arthur.

In Buffalo, New York, Dennis and Peggy team up with bartender Brad Morrow to rob the home of a wealthy man supposedly on vacation. The home's owner returns unexpectedly, so Arthur and Morrow abandon Dennis, who still manages to escape. When he confronts his partners and vows to keep all of their proceeds, they overcome him and severely beat him, sending him to the hospital.

While recovering at the hospital, Dennis receives special attention from nurse Martha Rollins, whom he now promises to marry. The two set up house in New Rochelle, where Dennis is able use his looks and charm to work his way into upper-class social circles and homes that he begins to burglarize. Martha finally realizes that he has continued his criminal activities when he is shot during a burglary attempt, but she nurses him back to health when he promises to stop once he comes back from New York City where he plans to fence the jewels and furs he has stolen.

In New York, though, Dennis meets Brenda Hall, a model at a fur store who has no qualms about his profession, and the two begin an affair. When Martha starts to worry why Dennis is spending so much time in the city, she travels to his hotel and discovers him with Brenda, who simply walks off on her own. Dennis again promises to return to New Rochelle, but Martha overcomes her own guilty feelings and brings his photograph to the police. Dennis does soon return and realizes that the police are closing in on him. Angered, he beats Martha and manages to escape yet again.

Posing as a jewelry designer on a train to Los Angeles, Dennis meets a wealthy divorcee, Mrs. Arthur Vinson, who takes him in at her expensive Beverly Hills home and introduces him to her social circle, which includes a number of famous movie stars—such as Errol Flynn, Alexis Smith, Joan Crawford, Dennis Morgan, and Loretta Young—whom he again begins to burglarize.

During all of these events, the local police in each community are continually frustrated by their inability to identify or capture this mysterious criminal, whom the newspapers and gossip columnist Sheila Graham (playing herself) have taken to calling "Raffles," after the fictional gentleman jewel thief. Eventually, however, the California police are able to identify Dennis from Martha's photograph which has been widely published. Learning that he might be heading to Cleveland to fence his jewels, they arrest him while he is saying goodbye at the airport to another young woman attracted to him.

Even so, Dennis escapes yet again when the police take him to New Rochelle. Hiding in a high-rise office building, he is finally surrounded by the police and taken into custody after a long chase and sentenced to prison.

== Cast ==
- David Brian as Gerard Graham Dennis
- Marjorie Reynolds as Martha Rollins
- John Archer as Police Detective Lou Sampter
- Jacqueline deWit as Mrs. Arthur Vinson
- Perdita Chandler as Peggy Arthur
- Stanley Church as Stanley Church
- Alix Talton as Brenda Hall
- Cleo Moore as Vivacious Blonde at Airport (uncredited)
- Dimples Cooper (Elizabeth Cooper) as Chinese girl (uncredited)

== Production ==
The film is based on the real-life case of Gerard Dennis, known as a "society thief" after a string of jewel robberies netting a total of more than $600,000 in his native Montreal, Hollywood, and Westchester County, New York, where he was sentenced to at least 18 years in prison in July 1949. Dennis was a career criminal who had been previously convicted of breaking and entering, possessing burglary tools and the attempted murder of a baby. From prison, Dennis granted permission for his story to be told on film.

== Reception ==
In a contemporary review for The New York Times, critic Howard Thompson called The Great Jewel Robber a "spasmodically sincere attempt to show how crime didn't pay" and wrote: "[T]he picture has some dogmatic finger-wagging, but on the whole it's little more than a routine, backhanded glorification of a Raffles-Casanova."
