= Lone Star (1952 film) =

1952 film by Vincent Sherman

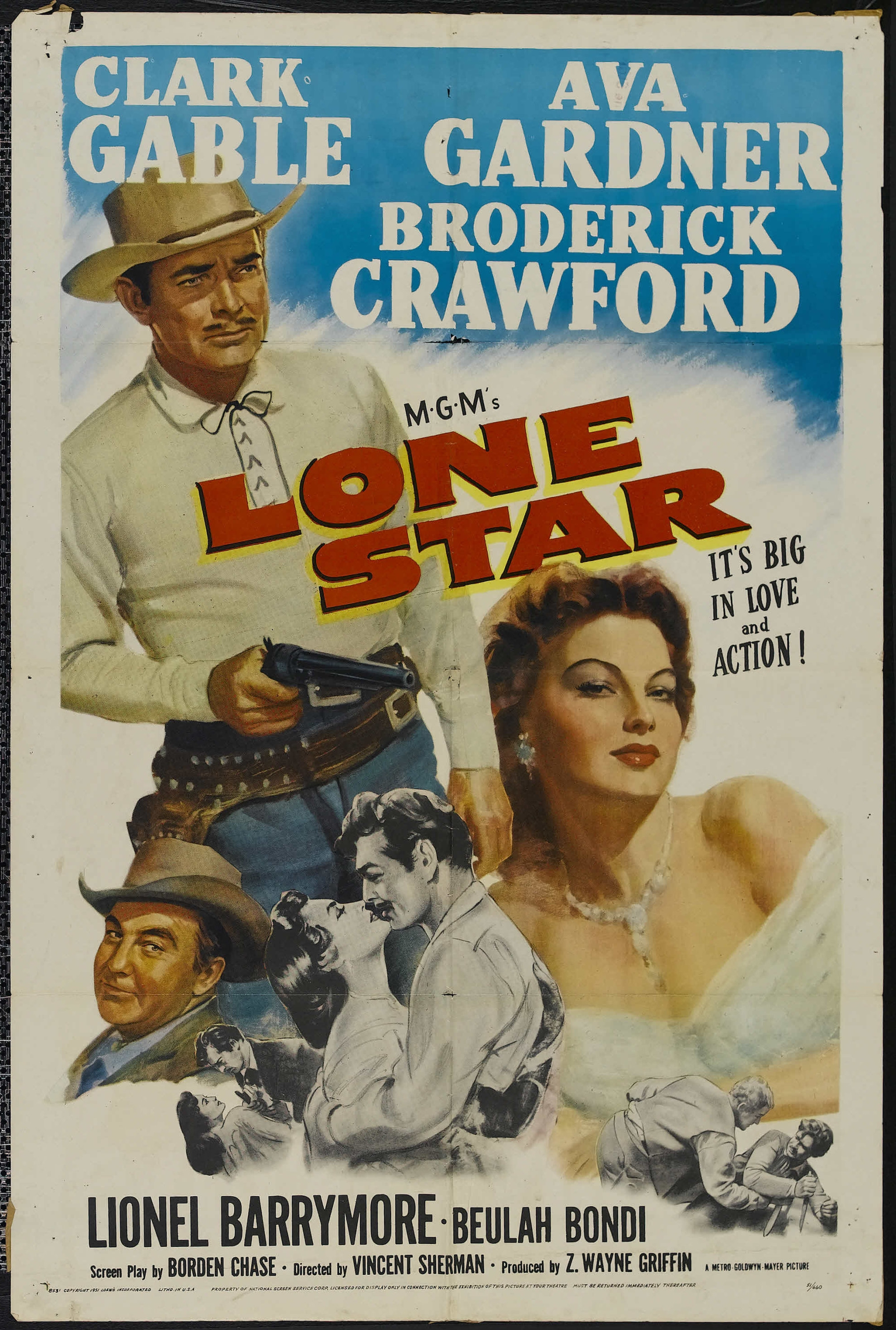
- Theatrical film poster
- Directed by: Vincent Sherman
- Written by: Borden Chase; Howard Estabrook
- Produced by: Z. Wayne Griffin
- Starring: Clark Gable; Ava Gardner; Broderick Crawford; Lionel Barrymore; Beulah Bondi
- Cinematography: Harold Rosson
- Edited by: Ferris Webster
- Music by: David Buttolph
- Production company: Metro-Goldwyn-Mayer
- Distributed by: Loew's, Inc.
- Release date: February 1, 1952 (New York)
- Running time: 94 minutes
- Country: United States
- Language: English
- Budget: $1.6 million
- Box office: $3.9 million

Lone Star is a 1952 American Western film directed by Vincent Sherman and starring Clark Gable, Ava Gardner, Broderick Crawford, Ed Begley and Lionel Barrymore (in his final role).

== Plot ==
Devereaux Burke receives a request from former president Andrew Jackson to facilitate the annexation of Texas into the United States. Opposition to annexation is gaining favor because it is mistakenly believed that Texas pioneer Sam Houston opposes statehood.

Opposition leader and wealthy rancher Thomas Craden is ambushed by Comanche Indians, and Dev comes to his rescue. Dev and Craden travel to Austin, where they meet Martha Ronda, who operates the local newspaper. Craden does not know that Dev supports annexation when he invites him to a dinner at his home for several senators. When the senators refuse to agree to vote against annexation, Craden refuses them permission to leave. Dev is allowed to leave, but he soon returns with a group of armed men to rescue the senators and reveals his support for annexation.

The senators inform Dev that Houston is on the other side of the Pecos River, negotiating a peace treaty with the Apache. Dev leaves to find Houston, but is followed by Craden. Dev and Craden find Houston with the Apache Indians. Dev receives a signed letter from Houston describing Houston's actual position, but the ink smears when Dev falls into a river while fleeing from Craden's men. Dev faces difficulty persuading Martha that he is telling the truth, but after confirming the facts with Craden, she publishes the correct story about Houston's position.

When the people of Austin are told the truth of Houston's position, they rally in support of annexation. Craden resorts to force to stop the Texas Congress from voting on annexation. Dev is summoned to organize the defense of the Texas Congress. Craden attacks the congress building with several dozen armed men on horseback. Dev leads the defenders as they repulse two waves of attack, but the battle begins to turn against them during the third wave of attack. Houston arrives with the Apache just in time to end the battle before any senators are killed. Dev and Craden fight each other hand-to-hand. Annexation succeeds, Craden concedes and Dev saves the day.

== Cast ==
- Clark Gable as Devereaux Burke / Bill Jones
- Ava Gardner as Martha Ronda
- Broderick Crawford as Thomas Craden
- Lionel Barrymore as Andrew Jackson
- Beulah Bondi as Minniver Bryan
- Ed Begley as Senator Anthony Demmet (as Claud Demmet)
- James Burke as Luther Kilgore
- William Farnum as Senator Tom Crockett
- Lowell Gilmore as Captain Charles Elliot
- Moroni Olsen as Sam Houston
- Russell Simpson as Senator Maynard Cole
- William Conrad as Mizette
- Lucius Cook as Seth Moulton
- Ralph Reed as Bud Yoakum
- Ric Roman as Gurau
- Victor Sutherland as President Anson Jones
- Jonathan Cott as Ben McCulloch
- Charles Cane as Mr. Mayhew
- Nacho Galindo as Vincente
- Trevor Bardette as Sid Yoakum
- Harry Woods as George Dellman
- Dudley Sadler as Ashbel Smith
- Emmett Lynn as Josh
- George Hamilton as Noah (uncredited)
- Mitchell Lewis as Senator (uncredited)

== Production ==
Lone Star was to be the initial offering of Hudson Pictures, a company formed by Gable and Z. Wayne Griffin. Screenwriter Borden Chase later said: "Vincent Sherman was the only one who destroyed a picture of mine completely. ... I wanted George Sherman. You see, Gable decided that he didn't want to have his own company and he sold the picture back to Metro. Dore Schary and I have never been close friends. He was then the boss at Metro, so I had Vincent Sherman and that was that. ... Had I been in Schary's position I would have done the same, I'd hit him just as hard as he hit me. He was on top. He won."

When Gable and Griffin sold the property back to Metro for $300,000 it kept Clark on as star and Griffin on as producer. Gable was also going through a divorce at the time, so producing was of no interest to him.

== Reception ==
In a contemporary review for The New York Times, critic A. H. Weiler wrote: "'Lone Star' is merely a king-size Western in which love is as mighty as muscle. It isn't art and it isn't history precisely, but the producers have Mr. Gable tussling with assorted villains and the prettiest gal north of the Rio Grande, so it probably doesn't matter, after all. At any rate, Vincent Sherman, the director, has kept the action simmering ... Suffice it to say that Mr. Gable is a man who is ready to throw a punch and fire a six-gun as well as pitch woo."

According to MGM records, the film earned $2,478,000 in the U.S. and Canada and $1,444,000 elsewhere, resulting in a profit of $990,000.
