= The Devil's Party =

1938 film by Ray McCarey

- Directed by: Ray McCarey
- Written by: Roy Chanslor
- Based on: Hell's Kitchen Has a Pantry by Borden Chase
- Produced by: Edmund Grainger
- Starring: Victor McLaglen; William Gargan; Paul Kelly
- Cinematography: Milton R. Krasner
- Edited by: Philip Cahn
- Music by: Score: Charles Previn; Songs: Jimmy McHugh (music); Harold Adamson (lyrics)
- Production company: Universal Pictures
- Distributed by: Universal Pictures
- Release date: May 20, 1938
- Running time: 65 minutes
- Country: United States
- Language: English

The Devil's Party is a 1938 American crime film directed by Ray McCarey based on the Borden Chase novel Hell's Kitchen Has a Pantry.

== Plot ==
Marty Malone is a member of a street gang called the "Death Avenue Cowboys", consisting of poor children in Hell's Kitchen, New York. As the gang try to steal fruit from a fruit warehouse, Marty starts a fire to distract the watchmen, unfortunately it turns into a real blaze and he is caught by the police. Even though the police give him a rough time in questioning, he refuses to say the names of any other gang members, thus saving his friends and accomplices from capture. Marty is sent to a reformatory for delinquents.

Many years go by after that, and now Marty is the proud owner of the Cigarette Club, which is a cabaret and casino in Manhattan. In tending to his business, he sends men to strong-arm a customer reluctant to pay a gambling debt. The goons, Sam and Frank Diamond, beat the customer up, accidentally killing him. They try to make his death look as if a neon sign fell on him.

The police emergency squad investigating the death includes brothers Joe and Mike O'Mara, who graduated from Marty's childhood gang. Authorities dismiss the death as an accident, but Joe, eager to become a police detective, believes it was murder when he finds evidence that the support that gave way allowing the sign to fall was clearly cut rather than breaking with age.

That evening there is a reunion dinner at Marty's Cigarette Club, with the boyhood friends attending, including the O'Mara's. Jerry Donovan is now a priest, and Helen McCoy has become a performer at the club. Helen has spurned Marty's many proposals because she loves Mike O'Mara. Mike dances with Helen all evening.

Brother Joe, striking out with the ladies, exits the dinner, returns to the scene of the murder, impatient to solve the crime he believes was committed. Diamond and Sam, having realized he may expose them, corner him and push him off the roof to his death.

Later that evening, Marty arrives on the scene and is upset his incompetent thugs have perpetrated the murders. The homicide bureau dismisses Joe's case as an accident, but Mike is unconvinced, and believes Joe's death is connected to the previous one. He is also guilt stricken he didn't accompany his brother to investigate his hunch on the incident that brought his death.

Diamond and Sam rob a jewelry store, set off a bomb next to Marty's club, and send notes to Mike incriminating Marty. Mike takes the bait, loses control and tries to kill Marty, but Jerry stops him, and Mike is arrested. Marty refuses to press charges, and also confesses his involvement to Jerry. He explains to Jerry that he never intended any deaths to occur.

Diamond and Sam plan to rob the Polar Gardensa popular ice skating ring, and force Marty to participate through kidnapping Helen who wisely informs Jerry of where she is going. Diamond and Sam alert Mike of the plan, hoping he will kill Marty. Mike again goes berserk, but Jerry again prevents Mike from killing Marty. In a shootout with the criminals, Marty dies taking a bullet intended for Mike. His death brings Mike and Helen together, and as Marty had requested, there is a playground built at Jerry's boys club in Marty's name.

== Cast ==
- Victor McLaglen as Marty Malone
- William Gargan as Mike O'Mara
- Paul Kelly as Jerry Donovan
- Beatrice Roberts as Helen McCoy
- Frank Jenks as Sam
- John Gallaudet as Joe O'Mara
- Samuel S. Hinds as Judge Harrison
- Joe Downing as Frank Diamond
- Arthur Hoyt as Webster
- Jerry Tucker as Child (uncredited)

== Opening ==
The film opens with the following: "Hell's Kitchen – a section of New York, where, not so many years ago, the children of the slums made their playground in that grim street ... DEATH AVENUE." A later intertitle reads: "An enduring friendship moves with the years to Hell's Kitchen's other boundary ... BROADWAY."
