= Lowell Gilmore =

American actor (1906–1960)

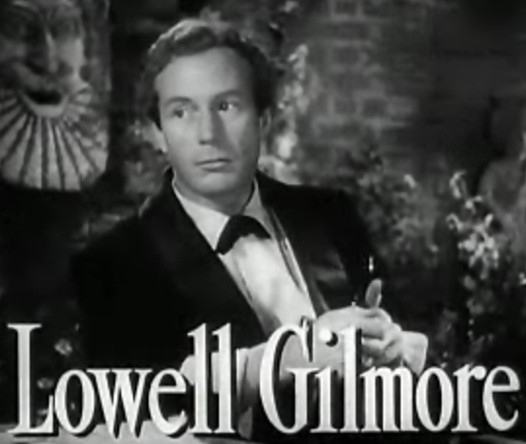
- as Basil Hallward in The Picture of Dorian Gray (1945)
- Born: Lowell Thompson Gilmore; December 20, 1906; Saint Paul, Minnesota, U.S.
- Died: January 31, 1960 (aged 53); Hollywood, California, U.S.
- Resting place: Pierce Brothers Valhalla Memorial Park, North Hollywood
- Years active: 1929–1958

Lowell Gilmore (December 20, 1906 – January 31, 1960) was an American stage, film, and television actor.

== Life and career ==
Lowell Gilmore first worked as a stage manager on the 1929 Broadway play The First Mrs. Fraser, but got his chance as an actor when he replaced actor Eric Elliott in the play. This was the start to a successful Broadway career in the 1930s with plays such as The Wind and the Rain (1934), The Taming of the Shrew (1935), and Leave Her to Heaven (1940). He made his film debut in Jacques Tourneur's war drama Days of Glory (1944) with Gregory Peck, where he was featured in an extensive role as Peck's second-in-command. His second film role was as painter Basil Hallward in The Picture of Dorian Gray (1945), the film adaption of Oscar Wilde's novel. Other roles include the Duke of Gloucester (the future Richard III) in The Black Arrow (1948) and Eric Masters in the Oscar-winning adventure film King Solomon's Mines (1950).

Although Gilmore was American, the "suave-looking, wavy-haired supporting actor" often portrayed British characters such as doctors, officers, and gentlemen of rank. His roles often included dapper cads and villains. During the 1950s, he appeared in television series including Alfred Hitchcock Presents and The Jack Benny Program. Gilmore appeared as Pontius Pilate in the television series The Living Christ Series (1951) and the film Day of Triumph (1954).

He played his last role in 1958 and died two years later at age 53, the cause was not disclosed to the public.

== Filmography (without TV credits) ==
- Days of Glory (1944) - Semyon
- The Picture of Dorian Gray (1945) - Basil Hallward
- Johnny Angel (1945) - Sam Jewell
- Strange Conquest (1946) - Dr. Paul Harris
- Step by Step (1946) - Von Dorn
- The Arnelo Affair (1947) - Dr. Avery Border
- Calcutta (1947) - Eric Lasser
- The Prince of Thieves (1948) - Sir Phillip
- The Black Arrow (1948) - Duke of Gloucester
- Dream Girl (1948) - George Hand
- Walk a Crooked Mile (1948) - Dr. William Forrest
- The Secret Garden (1949) - British Officer
- Sword in the Desert (1949) - Major Stephens
- Fortunes of Captain Blood (1950) - George Fairfax
- Rogues of Sherwood Forest (1950) - Count of Flanders
- Tripoli (1950) - Lieutenant Tripp
- King Solomon's Mines (1950) - Eric Masters
- Darling, How Could You! (1951) - Aubrey Quayne
- The Highwayman (1951) - Oglethorpe
- Roadblock (1951) - Kendall Webb
- The Living Christ Series (1951) - Pontius Pilate
- Hong Kong (1952) - Danton
- Lone Star (1952) - Captain Elliott
- Plymouth Adventure (1952) - Edward Winslow
- Androcles and the Lion (1952) - Metellus
- Francis Covers the Big Town (1953) - Jefferson 'JG' Garnet
- Sailor of the King (1953) - Emissary of the King - USA version (uncredited)
- I Beheld His Glory (1953, TV Series) - Pontius Pilate
- Saskatchewan (1954) - Banks
- Day of Triumph (1954) - Pontius Pilate
- Ma and Pa Kettle at Waikiki (1955) - Robert Coates
- The Sea Chase (1955) - Captain Evans
- Blood Alley (1955) - British Officer (uncredited)
- Comanche (1956) - Commissioner Ward
- Jeanne Eagels (1957) - Rev. Davidson in 'Rain' (uncredited)

== Selected Television Appearances ==
- Alfred Hitchcock Presents (1956) (Season 1 Episode 20: "And So Died Riabouchinska") as Mel Douglas
