= The Navy Comes Through =

1942 film by A. Edward Sutherland

- Film poster
- Directed by: A. Edward Sutherland
- Screenplay by: Roy Chanslor; Æneas MacKenzie
- Adaptation by: Earl Baldwin; John Twist
- Based on: "Pay to Learn"; 1939 story in The Saturday Evening Post by Borden Chase
- Produced by: Islin Auster
- Starring: Pat O'Brien; George Murphy; Jane Wyatt
- Cinematography: Nicholas Musuraca
- Edited by: Samuel E. Beetley
- Music by: Roy Webb
- Production company: RKO Radio Pictures
- Distributed by: RKO Radio Pictures
- Release dates: October 27, 1942 (San Francisco); October 30, 1942 (United States)
- Running time: 82 minutes
- Country: United States
- Language: English
- Box office: $1.7 million (US rentals)

The Navy Comes Through is a 1942 American World War II film directed by A. Edward Sutherland. It stars Pat O'Brien, George Murphy and Jane Wyatt. Vernon L. Walker and James G. Stewart were nominated for an Oscar for Best Special Effects. The film was based on Borden Chase's 1939 short story "Pay to Learn". The working titles of the film were Pay to Learn and Battle Stations. The film was the first RKO Pictures use of a new radio signal trademark that spelled out the word "victory." Prior to this, the studio's radio signal trademark spelled out "RKO."

== Plot ==
In 1940, the testimony of Chief Gunner's Mate Mike Mallory at a United States Navy Board of Inquiry regarding a fatal gun turret accident helps end the career of Lieutenant Tom Sands. The situation is complicated by the fact that Sands and Mallory's sister Myra are in love. Afterward, Sands resigns his commission and breaks up with Myra, telling her there is no future for them.

When the United States enters World War II, however, Sands rejoins the Navy as an enlisted man. By chance, he is assigned to Mallory, to their mutual displeasure. They and the rest of Mallory's men are disappointed to be assigned to man the guns of the freighter Sybil Gray. When Myra comes to see her brother off (though she is assigned to the same convoy as a Navy nurse), she encounters Sands, whom she had not seen since the inquiry.

On board, Coxswain G. Berringer recognizes Sands, making him a pariah among the navy sailors. On the voyage to England, they are attacked by a German U-boat on the surface. They exchange fire, before the submarine is driven off by escorting warships. Doctor Lieutenant Commander Murray and Myra are brought aboard to perform surgery on Bayless, seriously injured in the fighting. They remain on the ship to avoid delaying the convoy further. A near encounter with a German pocket battleship in the fog causes Sands to admit to Myra that he still loves her.

Later, two German airplanes strafe and bomb the Sybil Gray. When Myra is knocked out by falling debris, Sands abandons his machine gun to carry her to safety. While he is gone, Berringer, the other sailor manning the gun, is fatally wounded. The two aircraft are shot down, but the sailors now believe that Sands is a coward.

When "Babe" Duttson's radio intercepts a German message, Austrian-born "Dutch" Croner is able to interpret it. He informs Mallory that a German U-boat supply ship is nearby. Mallory persuades the freighter's captain to change course and capture the vessel. Unbeknownst to the Americans, once the German captain realizes he cannot get away, he has one of the torpedoes rigged to explode after a delay, but the suspicious Sands foils that scheme.

Then, he disobeys Mallory's order to guide the German ship to Belfast. He has decided they can load unsuspecting U-boats with booby-trapped torpedoes. As Sands is the only qualified navigator available, Mallory has no choice but to agree. The plan goes without a hitch the first three times, but an officer on the fourth submarine recognizes Dutch as a famous anti-Nazi violinist. The two ships exchange fire. Then another U-boat surfaces and joins the battle. The Americans sink both submarines, but the hold of the supply ship is set on fire. When Mallory goes to deal with it, he is overcome by the fumes. Sands rescues him. After the action, Sands questions Mallory about his actions during the battle that endangered their ship. Mallory admits the situation was similar to that in which he testified against Sands—except that no one survived to prove that Sands was not negligent. Returning to the United States, the Board of Inquiry is reconvened and Sands is reinstated as an officer.

== Cast ==
- Pat O'Brien as Chief Michael "Mike" Mallory
- George Murphy as Lieutenant/Seaman 2c Thomas L. "Tom" Sands
- Jane Wyatt as Myra Mallory
- Jackie Cooper as Joe "Babe" Duttson
- Carl Esmond as Richard "Dutch" Croner
- Max Baer as Coxswain G. Berringer
- Desi Arnaz as Pat Tarriba, a Cuban who enlists to repay American help in freeing Cuba
- Ray Collins as Captain McCall
- Lee Bonnell as Kovac
- Frank Jenks as Sampier
- John Maguire as James Bayless
- Frank Fenton as Hodum
- Joey Ray as James Dennis
- Marten Lamont as Lieutenant Commander Murray
- Helmut Dantine as a Frightened German Seaman
- Bud Geary as Quartermaster McPhail

== Reception ==
Thomas M. Pryor of The New York Times called the plot "hackneyed" but wrote that it was directed "with a good sense of melodramatic pace" and that the two lead actors played their roles well. Variety wrote: "This is an actionful, exciting naval adventure with strong romantic interest ... The battle sequences are especially effective." Harrison's Reports called it a "pretty good war melodrama ... Although the story is, at times, on the fanciful side, it has been presented in so thrilling a fashion that the interest never lags." Film Daily reported: "Excellent masculine entertainment is offered by this thunderbolt of excitement."

=== Box office ===
The film was a surprise hit and earned a profit of $542,000.
