= Day of Triumph =

- Directed by: Irving Pichel; John T. Coyle
- Written by: Arthur T. Horman
- Produced by: James K. Friedrich
- Starring: Lee J. Cobb; Robert Wilson; James Griffith; Joanne Dru
- Cinematography: Ray June
- Edited by: Thomas Neff
- Music by: Daniele Amfitheatrof
- Production company: Century Films
- Distributed by: Imperial Distributing Corp.
- Release dates: December 17, 1954 (Tyler, Texas, premiere)
- Running time: 110 minutes
- Country: United States
- Language: English

Day of Triumph is a 1954 American drama film directed by Irving Pichel and John T. Coyle, from a screenplay by Arthur T. Horman. The film stars Lee J. Cobb, Robert Wilson, James Griffith, and Joanne Dru.

This was the last film directed by Irving Pichel, who died on July 13, 1954, five months before the film was released.

== Synopsis ==
The film is Pichel's take on the life of Christ and focuses on the controversy and politics surrounding his life, particularly the activities of Zadok (Lee J. Cobb), leader of an anti-pagan group called the Zealots. Zadok initially plans to use Jesus (Robert Wilson) to rally support for the cause of political freedom. As he follows him, Jesus cures Mary Magdalene's mother and raises Lazarus from the dead—acts which wear away at Zadok's skepticism, but focus significant attention on Christ.

== Cast list ==
(cast list as per AFI database)

- Lee J. Cobb as Zadok, Zealot leader
- Robert Wilson as The Christ
- James Griffith as Judas Iscariot
- Ralph Freud as Caiaphas
- Everett Glass as Annas
- Tyler McVey as Peter
- Lowell Gilmore as Pontius Pilate
- Michael Connors as Andrew
- Anthony Warde as Barabbas
- Peter Whitney as Nikator
- Joanne Dru as Mary Magdalene

== Production ==
The picture was the first sound and first color film done about the life of Jesus. The last film having been Cecil B. DeMille's 1927 The King of Kings. The movie began filming the week of June 12, in Eastman Color. Joanne Dru was selected to play the role of Mary Magdalene, winning out over several other actresses, including Rita Hayworth, Jennifer Jones, and Susan Hayward. Many of the movie's exterior scenes were filmed on locations around the San Fernando Valley. Chatsworth Lake became the Sea of Galilee; Vazquez Rocks near Acton served as the tomb of Jesus; and the banks of the Jordan River, where John was baptizing, was shot at Far Lake, a tributary of Hansen Dam Lake. Production on the film wrapped the first week in July. A week later, Pichel died of a heart attack in his home. The film was financed by a group of Hollywood outsiders, based in Texas. The film's premiere was held on December 17, 1954, in Tyler, Texas, the home base of the film's backers.

== Reception ==
Variety gave the film a positive review, calling the picture "a handsomely mounted independent production, that abounds in dignity, restraint and distinction." They enjoyed the fictionalized account of the life of Christ, which they felt did not contain many of the "familiar embellishments" often found in biblical films. They complimented Pichel's direction; called Cobb's performance "forceful and shrewd"; said Dru gave a "touching performance"; and Griffith was "bitingly realistic". They particularly highlighted the performance of Wilson as Jesus, calling his portrayal, "humble, saintly and reverent". They also enjoyed the work of Gilmore, Warde, and Freud. They also gave good marks to Ray June's camera-work, Thomas Neff's editing, Daniele Amfitheatrof's music, as well as the production elements of Friedrich. The Tyler-Courier-Times-Telegraph also gave the film a good review, calling it a "remarkable blending of the straight Gospel with the history of the era in which Jesus lived, as set forth by the foremost historians of the day." The Los Angeles Times also gave the film a good review, declaring it was a "forcefully told story...rich in inspirational and human values". They also complimented the screenplay in handling several delicate issues in such an adept fashion so as to not offend any particular religious group. They also praised June's cinematography and Amfitheatrof's score, as well as the directing of Pichel. Among the cast, they congratulated Dru, Cobb, McVey, Connors, Gilmore, Freud, Glass, Whitney, Ward, and Gerry.
