= Under Pressure (1935 film) =

1935 film by Raoul Walsh, Irving Cummings

- Directed by: Raoul Walsh
- Screenplay by: Borden Chase; Lester Cole; Noel Pierce
- Based on: story by novel East River by Borden Chase and Edward Doherty
- Produced by: Robert Kane
- Starring: Edmund Lowe; Victor McLaglen; Florence Rice; Marjorie Rambeau; Charles Bickford; Sig Ruman
- Cinematography: Hal Mohr; L. William O'Connell
- Edited by: Robert Bischoff
- Production company: Fox Film Corporation
- Distributed by: Fox Film Corporation
- Release date: February 1, 1935
- Running time: 72 minutes
- Country: United States
- Language: English

Under Pressure is a 1935 American drama film directed by Raoul Walsh, written by Borden Chase, Lester Cole and Noel Pierce, and starring Edmund Lowe, Victor McLaglen, Florence Rice, Marjorie Rambeau, Charles Bickford and Sig Ruman. It was released on February 1, 1935, by Fox Film Corporation.

Chase wrote a story based on his Holland Tunnel experience with Edward Doherty. Film rights were bought by Fox Films who hired Chase to adapt the book and act as a technical adviser. Chase later adapted it into the novel East River.

The film was also known as East River and Man Lock.

== Cast ==
- Edmund Lowe as Shocker Dugan
- Victor McLaglen as Jumbo Smith
- Florence Rice as Pat Dodge
- Marjorie Rambeau as Amelia 'Amy' Hardcastle
- Charles Bickford as Nipper Moran
- Sig Ruman as Doctor
- Roger Imhof as George Breck
- Warner Richmond as Weasel
- James Donlan as Corky
