= The Man from Colorado =

1948 film by Henry Levin

- Theatrical release poster
- Directed by: Henry Levin
- Screenplay by: Robert Andrews; Ben Maddow
- Story by: Borden Chase
- Produced by: Jules Schermer
- Starring: Glenn Ford; William Holden
- Cinematography: William Snyder
- Edited by: Charles Nelson
- Music by: George Duning
- Color process: Technicolor
- Production company: Columbia Pictures
- Distributed by: Columbia Pictures
- Release date: December 1948
- Running time: 98 minutes
- Country: United States
- Language: English
- Budget: $1 million
- Box office: $2 million

The Man from Colorado is a 1948 American Western film directed by Henry Levin, produced by Jules Schermer for Columbia Pictures, and starring Glenn Ford as a Union officer who becomes addicted to killing during the American Civil War, William Holden as his best friend, and Ellen Drew as their common love interest. Robert Andrews and Ben Maddow based the screenplay on a story by Borden Chase. Although Ford received top billing as the mentally ill villain, Holden's role as the sympathetic hero is slightly larger.

== Plot ==
Union Colonel Owen Devereaux orders his regiment to fire on a detachment of Confederate soldiers, even though he (and only he) has seen that they are signaling their surrender with a white flag. Immediately after the battle, the soldiers learn the war has ended. As they celebrate, Sergeant Jericho Howard drinks while on duty, and Devereaux has him arrested. Later, the mayor announces Devereaux's appointment as federal judge for the region. He proposes to Caroline Emmett, who agrees to the marriage.

Afterwards, a veteran of the Confederate detachment confronts Devereaux about the white flag. Devereaux disarms him and then shoots him several times, even though the man has already been subdued. Devereaux's best friend, Del Stewart, witnesses the act. Based on the rebel soldier's anger and apparent veracity, Del concludes Devereaux must have seen a white flag. He further surmises the war has unhinged the new judge's mind. Nevertheless, Del agrees to serve as Devereaux's marshal. Devereaux's first big case as judge involves the taking over of mines from individual soldiers once they marched off to war. They want their mines back, but businessman Ed Carter argues that according to law, the mines are rightfully his. Devereaux upholds Carter's claim.

Led by the insubordinate Jericho Howard, a contingent of ex-soldiers and miners pull off a series of robberies designed to cripple Carter's mining venture. Devereaux threatens to hang Jericho's younger brother Johnny, based on circumstantial evidence, even though Johnny is not part of his brother's gang. After warning Devereaux not to hang Johnny, Del persuades Jericho to turn himself in. But when Devereaux hangs Johnny, Stewart resigns as marshal in disgust and joins Jericho's gang. Meanwhile, Devereaux's unstable judgment finally convinces the people to alert Colorado's territorial governor. The story finally climaxes in a confrontation between Devereaux and Jericho. They both die when a wall from a burning building falls on them. In the final scene, Del boards a stage for Washington, D.C. to plead on behalf of the dispossessed miners.

== Cast ==
- Glenn Ford as Owen Devereaux
- William Holden as Del Stewart
- Ellen Drew as Caroline Emmett
- Ray Collins as 'Big Ed' Carter
- Edgar Buchanan as Doc Merriam
- Jerome Courtland as Johnny Howard
- James Millican as Sergeant Jericho Howard
- Jim Bannon as Nagel
- William "Bill" Phillips as York
- Denver Pyle (uncredited) as Easy Jarrett

== Production ==
The movie was based on an original story by Borden Chase who sold it to Columbia in early 1946. Ben Maddow, who wrote the screenplay for producer Jules Schermer, also wrote Framed for Schermer.

Charles Vidor was one of Columbia's leading directors, his credits including Gilda. Vidor sued to get out of his contract with Columbia, and took the matter to court, but was lost. Harry Cohn, head of Columbia, then assigned Vidor to direct The Man from Colorado starring William Holden and Glenn Ford. It was commonly felt that Cohn did this as a punishment, Columbia's head of production Harry Cohn assigned the job to Vidor as a punishment, especially as Ford had given evidence against Vidor in the trial. It was alleged Vidor responded by shooting scenes slowly, and Columbia said the film was thirteen days behind schedule after 22 days of filming; in response, Vidor claimed the film was originally given a 60 day schedule but this was reduced to 48 days after he was assigned as director. Vidor was removed from the film in March 1947, replaced by Henry Levin (who had replaced Vidor on The Guilt of Janet Ames).

Producer Jule Schermer would also quit Columbia after making the movie.

== Reception ==
Variety wrote "Henry Levin had to overcome some difficult problems inasmuch as he had to blend mental medicine with gunplay, and frequently had to subordinate one for the other. Under those circumstances it was virtually impossible to sustain a mood."

The film was a solid box office success with estimated rentals in 1949 of $2 million.

== See also ==
- List of American films of 1948
- List of films and television shows about the American Civil War
