= Borden Chase =

American writer (1900–1971)

Borden Chase (January 11, 1900 – March 8, 1971) was an American writer.

== Early life ==
He was born Frank Fowler in New York, the son of an English couple who emigrated to Brooklyn. His father abandoned his wife and child, and Chase was raised by a set of grandparents who lived in Bensonhurst. He left school at fourteen and went through an assortment of jobs, including driving for gangster Frankie Yale and working as a sandhog on the construction of New York City's Holland Tunnel, where he worked with union leader Norman Redwood. He briefly serived in the Navy during World War One.

== Career ==
He turned to writing, first short stories and novels, and later, screenplays. He changed his name to Borden Chase, allegedly getting his nominal inspiration from Borden Milk and Chase Manhattan Bank. It did not become his legal name until 1955.

Chase wrote a story based on his Holland Tunnel experience with Edward Doherty. Film rights were bought by Fox Films who hired Chase to adapt the book and act as a technical adviser. The result was Under Pressure (1935), directed by Raoul Walsh. Chase later adapted it into the novel East River. (It was later filmed as "High Air" for Screen Directors Playhouse in 1956.) He also wrote regularly for magazines, later saying "I used to do a million words per year. My pulp market was Argosy and Detective Fiction, and I used to bat those things out, serials; and the slick market was American Magazine, The Saturday Evening Post and Liberty.”

Fox bought another story by Chase, Midnight Taxi (1937). Universal bought his novel Hells' Kitchen Has a Pantry and filmed it as The Devil's Party (1938). Fox bought another Chase story, Blue White and Perfect (1937) and turned it into a Michael Shayne film, Blue, White and Perfect (1942). His 1939 story Dr Broadway provided the basis for Anthony Mann's first film, Dr. Broadway (1942). Another 1939 story Pay to Learn was filmed as The Navy Comes Through (1942). Harrigan's Kid (1943) was based on his novel.

=== Screenwriter ===
Chase worked on the screenplay for Destroyer (1943). For Republic Pictures he wrote the John Wayne film The Fighting Seabees (1944) based on his own story.

In 1944, Chase signed a contract with RKO to write a screenplay based on his unpublished story That Man Malone at $10,000 a week. He provided the story and screenplay for MGM's This Man's Navy (1945) starring Wallace Beery, then did another original for Wayne at Republic, Flame of the Barbary Coast (1945).

Republic also made I've Always Loved You (1946), from screenplay by Chase based on his story Concerto, which in turn was based on the career of his first wife. Chase wrote Tycoon (1947) for Wayne at RKO, based on a novel by C E Scoggins, then provided the story for a Columbia Western, The Man from Colorado (1949).

=== Red River ===
Chase received great critical acclaim for Red River (1948), where he contributed to the screenplay, based on his novel Blazing Guns on the Chisholm Trail. Directed by Howard Hawks and starring Wayne and Montgomery Clift, the film was a huge success and earned Chase an Academy Award nomination as well as a $50,000 fee.

For most of the 1950s Chase worked on Westerns. He was one of many writers on the Errol Flynn saga Montana (1950). More notable was Winchester '73 (1950), directed by Mann and starring James Stewart. He also wrote The Great Jewel Robber (1950) for Warners. At Universal, Chase worked on the script for the remake of Iron Man (1951), a boxing film. He wrote another Western for Mann and Stewart, Bend of the River (1952), and did Lone Star (1952) for Clark Gable at MGM; MGM paid $60,000 for his story for the latter. That film was directed by Vincent Sherman who Chase said "was the only one [director] who destroyed a picture of mine completely."

Chase wrote The World in His Arms (1952), a sailing adventure, for Raoul Walsh at Universal. He did something in a similar vein, Sea Devils (1953), based on a Victor Hugo novel. Chase did a south seas adventure tale for Burt Lancaster, His Majesty O'Keefe (1954) which involved him going on location to Fiji.

He returned to Westerns with Rails Into Laramie (1954), with John Payne; The Far Country (1954) for Mann and Stewart; Vera Cruz (1954) for Lancaster and director Robert Aldrich; and Man Without a Star (1955) for King Vidor and Kirk Douglas. He did some uncredited writing on Mutiny on the Bounty (1962) and wrote Gunfighters of Casa Grande (1964). Chase's final movie credits include A Man Called Gannon (1968) (a remake of Man Without a Star) and Backtrack! (1969) (a theatrical release of his 1965 The Virginian episode "We've Lost a Train", which was the backdoor pilot for the 1965–67 series Laredo).

=== Television ===
Chase began writing for TV with "The Windmill" for General Electric Theatre (1955). He wrote the screenplay for Backlash (1956), directed by John Sturges and Night Passage (1957) for Mann and Stewart. The latter also starred Audie Murphy who was in Ride a Crooked Trail (1958), written by Chase.

Chase wrote several episodes of Tales of Wells Fargo (1959), Overland Trail (1960), The Detectives (1961), The Tall Man (1961), Whispering Smith (1961), Bonanza (1962), Route 66 (1962) and The Roy Rogers and Dale Evans Show (1962). Chase continued working for TV shows such as Daniel Boone, The Virginian (1964), and Branded (1965).

In 1970 Chase said "I don't think that I've forgotten how to write, but nobody seems to be interested in my writing, which is quite all right. I can dish it out and I can take it too. I hope when I get to Spain, there'll be some work for me, and I think I'll enjoy it there."

=== Reception ===
According to Jeanine Basinger, the films that "typify the characters and conflicts associated with Chase's work" were Winchester 73, Bend of the River and The Far Country:

First of all, two strong men are involved in an arduous journey across the western terrain, with units of society either contained within the journey itself (as a wagon train) or as various stops along the way (western towns, mining towns, etc.). The primary involvement of the movie is the conflict between two men, who tend to be deeply linked by some common bond... In some cases the conflict is internal, the hero against the evil inside himself. Although Chase created strong females in films... most Chase stories are male conflicts. Chase once said "That I believe is the greatest love story in all of the world. I don't mean sexual. I have always believed that a man can actually love and respect another man more so than he can a woman."... Straightforward dialogue, and absence of pretentious philosophizing, and clearly delineated action mark the story progressions, which culminate in unambiguous resolutions. Any ambiguities lie in the maturity of the characterizations, in which the two men are neither totally good nor totally bad. In this regard, Chase made a major contribution to what is thought of as the "adult" or "psychological" Westerns of the 1950s.

Basinger elaborated:

The Chase Western story is presented in a physical progression across a larger-than-life landscape, an epic journey west which allows forces of good and evil to interact... The issue of the Chase Western script is not whether man will settle the West and live in it. It is assumed he will, or that he already has. The question is more universal and appropriate to modern life: Will the uncivilized forces within man create a Wild West in perpetuity by winning out over his better instincts?

== Personal life ==
Borden Chase and wife Lee Keith had one child together: a daughter, Barrie Chase, a now-retired actress and dancer. He had a son to an earlier marriage, Frank Chase, an American character actor and screenwriter. Lee also had a daughter, Pat, from an earlier relationship.

Chase became estranged from his wife in 1948 and they soon divorced. During Chase's 1949 divorce, Lee Keith reported that the least Chase had earned was $30,000 year and that the most he had earned had been $250,000. That year he was reportedly writing a film for James Cagney, Far Island. Lee claimed he had an affair with his step-daughter Pat, and that detectives found them in a hotel room together, naked. Chase went on to marry Pat. Barrie Chase recalled after her mother "went public" about her father's affair with her step sister "he threatened both our lives."

Chase was an active member of the Motion Picture Alliance for the Preservation of American Ideals, an anti-Communist group which was active in Hollywood during the years of the Hollywood blacklist. He later said:

.I was the ugly duckling in the Screen Writers Guild... I was an anti-Communist and didn't hesitate to say so. I was not very well liked, I'm not very well liked today... I was extremely active during the time of the House Committee on UnAmerican Activities. I was the chairman at that time of the Motion Picture Alliance for the Preservation of American Ideals. I simply don't like the thought of a change of government. I like the government we now have. I admit it is not the best of all possible governments, and I certainly am not an admirer of Mr. Nixon. But I do know about life in Russia and I don't want to exchange a life that will allow a hack driver who went to work when he was 14 to make enough money to buy this house

Chase suffered a stroke on December 12, 1970. He died on March 8, 1971.

The Borden Chase cocktail is named after him.

Chase supported Thomas Dewey in the 1944 United States presidential election.

== Filmography ==
=== Films ===
Year	Film	Credit	Notes
1935	Under Pressure	Screenplay By, Story By	
1937	Midnight Taxi	Story By	
1938	The Devil's Party	Story By	Based on his novel "Hell's Kitchen Has a Pantry"
1942	Blue, White and Perfect	Story By	
1942	Dr. Broadway	Story By	
1942	The Navy Comes Through	Story By	
1943	Harrigan's Kid	Story By	Based on his novel "Harrigan's Kid"
1943	Destroyer	Screenplay By	
1944	The Fighting Seabees	Screenplay By, Story By	
1945	This Man's Navy	Screenplay By	
1945	Flame of the Barbary Coast	Screenplay By	
1946	I've Always Loved You	Screenplay By, Story By	
1947	Tycoon	Screenplay By	
1948	Red River	Story By, Screenplay By	
1948	The Man from Colorado	Story By	
1950	Montana	Screenplay By	
1950	Winchester '73	Screenplay By	
1950	The Great Jewel Robber	Written By	
1951	Iron Man	Screenplay By	
1952	The World in His Arms	Screenplay By	
1952	Bend of the River	Screenplay By	
1952	Lone Star	Screenplay By	
1953	Sea Devils	Screenplay By	
1954	Vera Cruz	Story By	
1954	The Far Country	Written By	
1954	His Majesty O'Keefe	Screenplay By	
1954	Rails Into Laramie	Screenplay By	Uncredited
1955	Man Without a Star	Screenplay By	
1956	Backlash	Screenplay By	
1957	Night Passage	Screenplay By	
1958	Ride a Crooked Trail	Story By	
1962	Mutiny On The Bounty	Screenplay By	Uncredited
1964	Gunfighters of Casa Grande	Screenplay By, Story By	
1967	Winchester 73	Screenplay By	
1968	A Man Called Gannon	Screenplay By	
1969	Backtrack!	Written By	

=== Television ===
Year	TV Series	Credit	Notes
1955	General Electric Theater	Writer	1 Episode
1956	Screen Directors Playhouse	Writer	1 Episode
1957	Schlitz Playhouse of Stars	Writer	1 Episode
1959–60	Tales of Wells Fargo	Writer	4 Episodes
1960	Overland Trail	Writer	3 Episodes
1960	The Detectives	Writer	3 Episodes
1960	The Tall Man	Writer	1 Episode
1961	Whispering Smith	Writer	1 Episode
1962	Bonanza	Writer	2 Episodes
1962	Route 66	Writer	1 Episode
1962	The Roy Rogers and Dale Evans Show	Writer	6 Episodes
1963–65	The Virginian	Writer	3 Episodes
1964	Daniel Boone	Writer	1 Episode
1966	Branded	Writer	1 Episode

== Fiction ==
- East River, New York, 1935.
- Sandhog, New York, 1938.
- Lone Star, New York, 1942.
- Diamonds of Death, New York, 1947.
- Blazing Guns on the Chisholm Trail, New York, 1948, as Red River, New York, 1948.
- Viva Gringo!, New York, 1961.

=== Short stories ===
- Blue White and Perfect (1937)
- Dr Broadway (1939)
- The Called Him Mister (1940)
- Concerto

== Non fiction ==
- Sandhog: The Way of the Life of the Tunnel Builders, Evanston, Illinois, 1941.

== Notes ==
- Chase, Borden, and Jim Kitses. “THE RISE AND FALL OF THE AMERICAN WEST.” Film Comment, vol. 6, no. 4, 1970, pp. 14–21. JSTOR, http://www.jstor.org/stable/43450547. Accessed 18 Feb. 2026.
