= Flame of Barbary Coast =

1945 film

- Film poster
- Directed by: Joseph Kane
- Written by: Prescott Chaplin
- Screenplay by: Borden Chase
- Starring: John Wayne; Ann Dvorak; Joseph Schildkraut; William Frawley; Virginia Grey; Russell Hicks; Jack Norton; Paul Fix; Manart Kippen
- Cinematography: Robert De Grasse
- Edited by: Richard L. Van Enger
- Music by: R. Dale Butts; Morton Scott (uncredited); Mort Glickman (uncredited)
- Production company: Republic Pictures
- Distributed by: Republic Pictures
- Release date: May 28, 1945 (United States)
- Running time: 91 minutes
- Country: United States
- Language: English

Flame of Barbary Coast is a 1945 American musical-drama film starring John Wayne, Ann Dvorak, Joseph Schildkraut, William Frawley, and Virginia Grey. The movie was scripted by Borden Chase and directed by Joseph Kane.

== Plot ==
Naive Montana cowboy Duke Fergus arrives in San Francisco and visits the notorious Barbary Coast. Fergus becomes smitten with the lovely star attraction of the fanciest gambling hall, "Flaxen" Tarry, the "Flame of the Barbary Coast". Fergus gets talked into gambling against the owner (and Flaxen's lover), card shark Tito Morell. Predictably, Fergus gets cheated and loses all his money.

Fergus sets himself to win Flaxen's affections and decides the best way to do it is to take over. Fergus gets his friend Wolf Wylie to teach him everything about gambling, including how to spot cheating. When Duke's ready, he sells all he owns and returns to the city to challenge Morell's rule of the Barbary Coast. He goes from casino to casino, challenging each one's resident poker champion to a heads-up game, starting with Morell. Duke wins every time.

Fergus then builds an opulent new gambling establishment, catering to the upper class. To make it a success, he needs to persuade Flaxen to come work for him, but she is initially not interested. Only when Morell offends her does she decide to accept Fergus' offer. On opening night of the new establishment, Morell comes to challenge Fergus and win back Flaxen only in the midst of it all, a great earthquake hits, leaving Fergus' and Morell's businesses destroyed and Flaxen grievously injured. The town rebuilds and Fergus helps Flaxen in her recovery.

In the aftermath, both Fergus and Morell run for mayor. Fergus catches Morell's men in the act of trying to rig the election. Fergus turns the results over the people to have them decide in favor of returning to Montana to marry Flaxen, while Morell keeps his business and influence.

== Cast ==
- John Wayne as Duke Fergus
- Ann Dvorak as Ann "Flaxen" Tarry
- Joseph Schildkraut as Boss Tito Morell
- William Frawley as Wolf Wylie
- Virginia Grey as Rita Dane
- Russell Hicks as Cyrus Danver
- Jack Norton as Byline Conners
- Paul Fix as Calico Jim
- Manart Kippen as Dr. Gorman
- Eve Lynne as Martha
- Marc Lawrence as Joe Disko
- Butterfly McQueen as Beulah
- Rex Lease as Collingswood
- Hank Bell as Hank
- Al Murphy as Horseshoe Brown

== Production ==
The film was announced in May 1944. It was one of eight "super de luxe" productions from Republic Pictures for 1944–45, the others being Lake Placid Serenade, Storm Over the Philippines, Hit Parade, A Fabulous Texan, Earl Carroll's Vanities, and Let the Hurricane Roar.

Ann Dvorak, who had made her last three films in England, signed a long-term contract with Republic and was assigned the female lead. Eve Lynne, a magazine cover model who had never acted before, was cast in a supporting role.

== Awards ==
The film was nominated for two Academy Awards; Music Score of a Dramatic or Comedy Picture and Sound Recording (Daniel J. Bloomberg).

== See also ==
- List of American films of 1945
- John Wayne filmography
