= John Bonar (set decorator) =

American set decorator

- Born: July 10, 1886; Europe
- Died: March 28, 1963 (aged 76); Los Angeles, California, USA
- Occupation: Set decorator
- Years active: 1944-1945

John Bonar (July 10, 1886 – March 28, 1963) was an American set decorator, who was born somewhere in the Balkans. He was nominated for an Academy Award in the category Best Art Direction for the film The Picture of Dorian Gray.

== Selected filmography ==
- The Picture of Dorian Gray (1945)
