= Rudolph Sternad =

American art director and production designer

- Born: October 6, 1906
- Died: April 23, 1963 (aged 56)
- Occupation: Art director
- Years active: 1936-1964

Rudolph Sternad (October 6, 1906 – April 23, 1963) was an American art director and production designer. He was nominated for three Academy Awards in the category Best Art Direction. He was a frequent collaborator of producer-director Stanley Kramer, working with him on virtually all of the films that Kramer directed, and many famous ones that he only produced, such as High Noon, Cyrano de Bergerac, and The Men.

== Selected filmography ==
Sternad was nominated for three Academy Awards for Best Art Direction:

- Judgment at Nuremberg (1961) (for which he was actually production designer; no art director was credited)
- A Thousand and One Nights (1945)
- The Talk of the Town (1942)

Only one of the nominations (Judgment at Nuremberg) was for a Stanley Kramer film.
