= W. V. Wolfe =

American sound engineer

- Occupation: Sound engineer
- Years active: 1944

W. V. Wolfe was an American sound engineer. He was nominated for an Academy Award in the category Sound Recording for the film Three Is a Family.

== Selected filmography ==
- Three Is a Family (1944)
