= A Thousand and One Nights (1945 film) =

1945 film by Alfred E. Green

- Theatrical release poster
- Directed by: Alfred E. Green
- Screenplay by: Wilfred H. Petitt (Note: Credited as Wilfrid H. Pettitt); Richard English; Jack Henley
- Story by: Wilfred H. Petitt
- Produced by: Samuel Bischoff
- Starring: Evelyn Keyes; Phil Silvers; Adele Jergens; Cornel Wilde
- Cinematography: Ray Rennahan
- Edited by: Gene Havlick
- Music by: Marlin Skiles
- Production company: Columbia Pictures
- Distributed by: Columbia Pictures
- Release date: July 20, 1945
- Running time: 94 minutes
- Country: United States
- Language: English

A Thousand and One Nights is a 1945 American adventure fantasy comedy film set in the Baghdad of the One Thousand and One Nights, directed by Alfred E. Green and starring Evelyn Keyes, Phil Silvers, Adele Jergens and Cornel Wilde.

The film was nominated for two Academy Awards, for Best Art Direction, Color (Stephen Goosson, Rudolph Sternad, Frank Tuttle) and Best Special Effects (Ray Bomba and Lawrence W. Butler).

== Plot ==
Vagabond singer Aladdin has his hands full keeping his pickpocket friend, Abdullah, out of trouble. Abdullah is thought insane as he claims to have been born 1,200 years too early, speaks in 1940s slang and knows about television.

Princess Armina, the beautiful daughter of Sultan Kamar Al-Kir, is borne through the streets of Baghdad in a palanquin. Despite knowing the punishment is death for a commoner to see her face, Aladdin distracts the guards and slips into the palanquin. He persuades Armina to drop her veil and is delighted to discover the stories of her beauty are true. He kisses her, and she surrenders to his charms before he slips away.

That night, Aladdin sneaks back into the palace to woo Armina. He is caught and thrown in the dungeon—where he finds Abdullah—to await execution the next day. Distraught, Armina has her trusted lady-in-waiting Novira steal the key to the dungeon from the jailer and slip it to Aladdin. Aladdin and Abdullah flee the city, pursued by the Sultan's guards. They hide out in a cave where Kofir, the sorcerer, persuades Aladdin to enter the bowels of the cave to fetch a magic lamp. Aladdin and the uneasy Abdullah dodge a laughing giant and return with the lamp, only to find that Kofir has sealed the entrance. Kofir demands the lamp before he will let them out, but Aladdin does not trust him. The sorcerer leaves them to die.

When a frustrated Aladdin throws the lamp away, a red-headed female genie appears and instructs him to rub the lamp, which makes him her master. She explains that only her master can see or hear her, and insists he call her Babs. He orders her to free them from the cave, but when he decides to return to the palace for the princess, the genie is disappointed as she has fallen in love with him. As Aladdin commands the genie to transform him into a prince, he and Abdullah are magically provided with sumptuous clothes and a retinue of servants.

Meanwhile, the Sultan's twin brother, Prince Hadji, who has already tried to overthrow his brother once before, makes the Sultan his captive and takes his place undetected. Hadji is aided by the treacherous Grand Wazir Abu-Hassan, who is promised Armina's hand in marriage as a reward.

When Aladdin shows up pretending to be a prince of Hindustan, however, the Sultan changes his mind, preferring a rich son-in-law. The genie does her best to derail the romance. Spotting Kofir, who has been watching the proceedings through his magic crystal and is posing as a merchant offering new lamps for old, the genie tricks Novira into exchanging the magic lamp. Once Kofir becomes the genie's master, Aladdin is transformed back into a vagabond. Aladdin and Abdullah are taken away to be hanged, but Abu-Hassan offers to spare their lives if Armina agrees to marry him.

Aladdin is set free, believing Armina was only toying with him. Later, however, Novira tells him about Armina's bargain with Abu-Hassan. Aladdin and Abdullah track Kofir down and discover that he was overcome with excitement and died of a stroke. As a tailor takes possession of the lamp and wishes for the Sultan's robes, Hadji's clothes disappear, interrupting Armina and Abu-Hassan's wedding ceremony. Noticing that the Sultan does not have a scar on his arm, Armina realizes that Hadji is posing as her father and tells Abu-Hassan. Upon learning from Abu-Hassan that Armina knows the truth, Hadji stabs Abu-Hassan and goes to kill Armina.

After Abdullah steals the lamp from the tailor, Aladdin returns to the palace and engages Hadji in a sword fight, which ends with Hadji falling over the staircase to his death. The grateful Sultan agrees to Aladdin and Armina's marriage. Aladdin frees the heartbroken genie and she conjures up Aladdin's twin, who immediately falls in love with her. To reward Abdullah, she gives him Frank Sinatra's voice to entrance the harem girls.

== Cast ==
- Evelyn Keyes as Babs, the Genie
- Phil Silvers as Abdullah
- Adele Jergens as Princess Armina
- Cornel Wilde as Aladdin
- Dusty Anderson as Novira
- Dennis Hoey as Sultan Kamar Al-Kir and Prince Hadji
- Philip Van Zandt as Grand Wazir Abu-Hassan
- Gus Schilling as Jafar
- Nestor Paiva as Kahim
- Rex Ingram as a giant
- Richard Hale as Kofir
- John Abbott as Ali
- Shelley Winters as a harem girl (uncredited)
- Nina Foch as a harem girl (uncredited)

== Reception ==
Dennis Schwartz described the film as "an attractive looking but buffoonish satire on the Arabian Nights" and stated "the laughs are hard to come by and are more unintentional than intentional."
