= Three Is a Family =

1944 film

- Directed by: Edward Ludwig
- Screenplay by: Harry Chandlee; Marjorie L. Pfaelzer
- Based on: Three's a Family by Henry Ephron and Phoebe Ephron
- Produced by: Sol Lesser
- Starring: Marjorie Reynolds; Charlie Ruggles; Fay Bainter
- Cinematography: Charles Lawton Jr.
- Edited by: Robert O. Crandall
- Music by: Werner R. Heymann
- Production company: Sol Lesser Productions
- Distributed by: United Artists
- Release date: November 23, 1944
- Running time: 81 minutes
- Country: United States
- Language: English
- Budget: $850,000 or $1 million (approx)

Three Is a Family is a 1944 American comedy film directed by Edward Ludwig and starring Marjorie Reynolds, Charlie Ruggles, and Fay Bainter. It is an adaptation of the hit 1943 play Three's a Family by Henry Ephron and Phoebe Ephron which ran for 497 performances on Broadway. It was distributed by United Artists. The film was nominated for an Academy Award for Best Sound Recording (W. V. Wolfe).

== Plot ==
The extended family of Sam Whitaker and his wife Frances all come to live in a crowded apartment in New York City during World War II. A series of chaotic events then ensues.

== Cast ==
- Marjorie Reynolds as Kitty Mitchell
- Charlie Ruggles as Sam Whitaker
- Fay Bainter as Frances Whittaker
- Helen Broderick as Irma
- Arthur Lake as Archie Whittaker
- Hattie McDaniel as Maid
- Jeff Donnell as Hazel Whittaker
- John Philliber as Dr. Bartell
- Walter Catlett as Barney Meeker
- Clarence Kolb as Mr. Steele
- Else Janssen as Adelaide
- Renie Riano as Genevieve
- Warren Hymer as Coolie
- Clyde Fillmore as Mr. Spencer
- Christian Rub as Bellboy
- William Terry as Joe Franklin
- Cheryl Walker as Marian Franklin
- Margaret Early as Steel's Daughter
- Frederick Brady as Gene Mitchell
- Shirley O'Hara as Janet

== Bibliography ==
- Fisher, James. Historical Dictionary of Contemporary American Theater: 1930-2010. Scarecrow Press, 2011.
