= The Picture of Dorian Gray (1945 film) =

1945 film by Albert Lewin

- Promotional poster
- Directed by: Albert Lewin
- Screenplay by: Albert Lewin
- Based on: The Picture of Dorian Gray; 1890 novel by Oscar Wilde
- Produced by: Pandro S. Berman
- Starring: George Sanders; Hurd Hatfield; Donna Reed; Angela Lansbury; Peter Lawford; Lowell Gilmore
- Narrated by: Cedric Hardwicke
- Cinematography: Harry Stradling
- Edited by: Ferris Webster
- Music by: Herbert Stothart
- Color process: Technicolor
- Production company: Metro-Goldwyn-Mayer
- Distributed by: Loew's Inc.
- Release date: March 3, 1945
- Running time: 110 minutes
- Country: United States
- Language: English
- Budget: $1,918,000
- Box office: $2,975,000

The Picture of Dorian Gray is a 1945 American supernatural horror-drama film adaptation of Oscar Wilde's 1890 novel The Picture of Dorian Gray. Released in March 1945 by Metro-Goldwyn-Mayer, the film was written and directed by Albert Lewin and produced by Pandro S. Berman. It stars George Sanders as Lord Henry Wotton and Hurd Hatfield as Dorian Gray, alongside Donna Reed, Angela Lansbury, Peter Lawford, and Lowell Gilmore. Cedric Hardwicke narrates.

The film is shot primarily in black-and-white, except four inserts in three-strip Technicolor of Dorian's portrait ranging from the youthful painting by Henrique Medina and the final, degenerate portrait by Ivan Le Lorraine Albright. The film was a critical success, winning the Academy Award for Best Cinematography for Harry Stradling. Angela Lansbury won the Golden Globe Award for Best Supporting Actress and received an Academy Award nomination for her role as Sibyl Vane.

== Plot ==
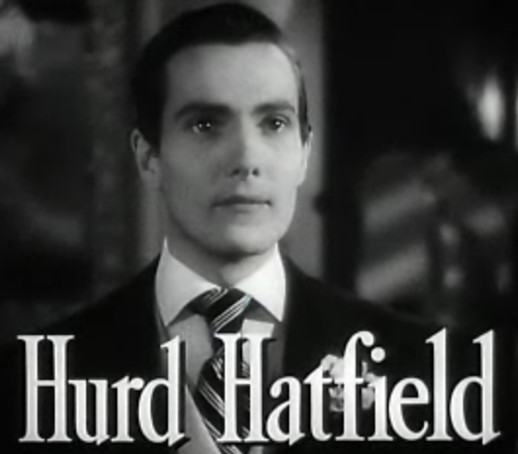
Hurd Hatfield plays Dorian Gray.

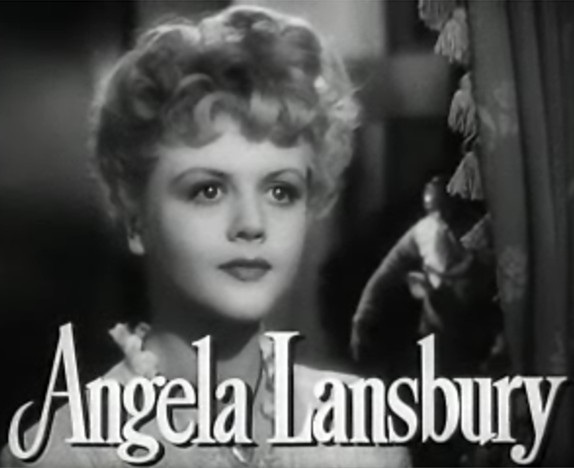
Angela Lansbury plays Sibyl Vane.

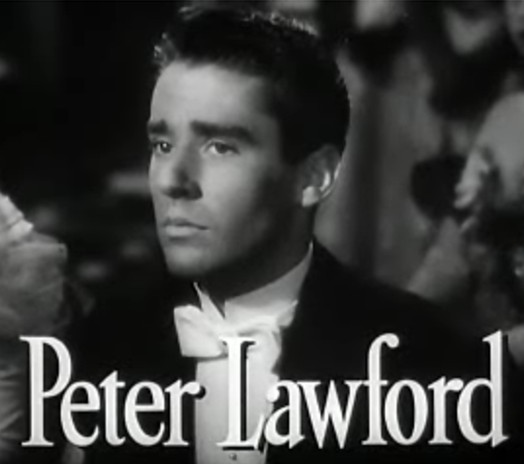
Peter Lawford plays David Stone.

While posing for a painting by his friend Basil Hallward, handsome young aristocrat Dorian Gray meets Hallward's friend Lord Henry Wotton. Wotton persuades Gray the only worthwhile life is dedicated to pleasure, because "what the gods give they quickly take away." Contemplating this, Gray wishes his portrait could age instead of him. He makes this wish in the presence of an Egyptian cat statue with supposed magical powers.

After callously breaking off his engagement to tavern singer Sibyl Vane, Gray finds the portrait has begun to change and wonders if his wish may have come true. He has the portrait locked away in his old schoolroom and disguises its location by firing servants who moved the painting, while Gray, after Sibyl's suicide, becomes more dedicated to a sinful and heartless life.

Years later, Dorian is 40 but still looks 22. London society is awestruck at his unchanging appearance. The portrait has remained locked away, with Gray holding the only key. Over the years, the portrait of the young, handsome, Dorian Gray has warped into a hideous, demon-like creature reflecting his many sins. When Hallward sees his painting, Gray murders his friend and seals his body in the school room next to the portrait, then blackmails his friend, Allen Campbell, to dispose of Hallward's body. Campbell, distraught at his role in destroying Hallward's corpse, commits suicide.

Gray starts a romance with Hallward's niece, Gladys. James Vane, Sibyl's brother, follows Gray to his country estate to achieve revenge for Sibyl's death and is shot by accident during a hunting party.

Gray despairs at his impact on others and realises he can spare Gladys from misfortune by leaving her. After sending Gladys a letter breaking their engagement, Gray confronts his portrait and sees a subtle improvement. He stabs the portrait in the heart, seeking to end the spell, but cries out as if he has also been stabbed. His friends, realizing what has happened, burst into the schoolroom to discover Gray dead next to the portrait, his deformed body now reflecting his sins in physical form. The portrait, by contrast, once more shows Dorian Gray as a young, innocent man.

== Cast ==
- George Sanders as Lord Henry Wotton
- Hurd Hatfield as Dorian Gray
- Donna Reed as Gladys Hallward
- Angela Lansbury as Sibyl Vane
- Peter Lawford as David Stone
- Lowell Gilmore as Basil Hallward
- Richard Fraser as James Vane
- Douglas Walton as Allen Campbell
- Morton Lowry as Adrian Singleton
- Miles Mander as Sir Robert Bentley
- Lydia Bilbrook as Mrs. Vane
- Mary Forbes as Lady Agatha
- Robert Greig as Sir Thomas
- Moyna Macgill as Duchess
- Anita Sharp-Bolster as Lady Harborough
- Billy Bevan as Malvolio Jones
- Lilian Bond as Kate
- Devi Dja as Lead Dancer

Uncredited cast members include

- Cedric Hardwicke as Narrator
- Mitchell Lewis as Waiter
- Reginald Owen as Lord George Farmour
- Carol Diane Keppler as Gladys Hallward (child)
- Devi Wani as Dancer
- Devi Mima as Dancer
- Devi Tina as Dancer

== Production ==
=== Book source ===
Changes to the original include the romance between Gladys and David and "some censorship restrictions that kept Dorian's unspeakable acts offscreen". In the book, the picture alters in response to Dorian's "good deed", but the alteration is ugly, reflecting his cynicism and self-serving motivation. He stabs the painting to destroy his conscience and eliminate the evidence. In the film, he reads a faint change in the painting as a sign of hope, yet stabs the painting as if he can undo his past. As he is transformed off-screen, he prays for forgiveness. Shortly after the discovery of Dorian's body, Lord Henry begs Heaven for his own forgiveness for leading the young man down the path of evil.

=== Paintings ===
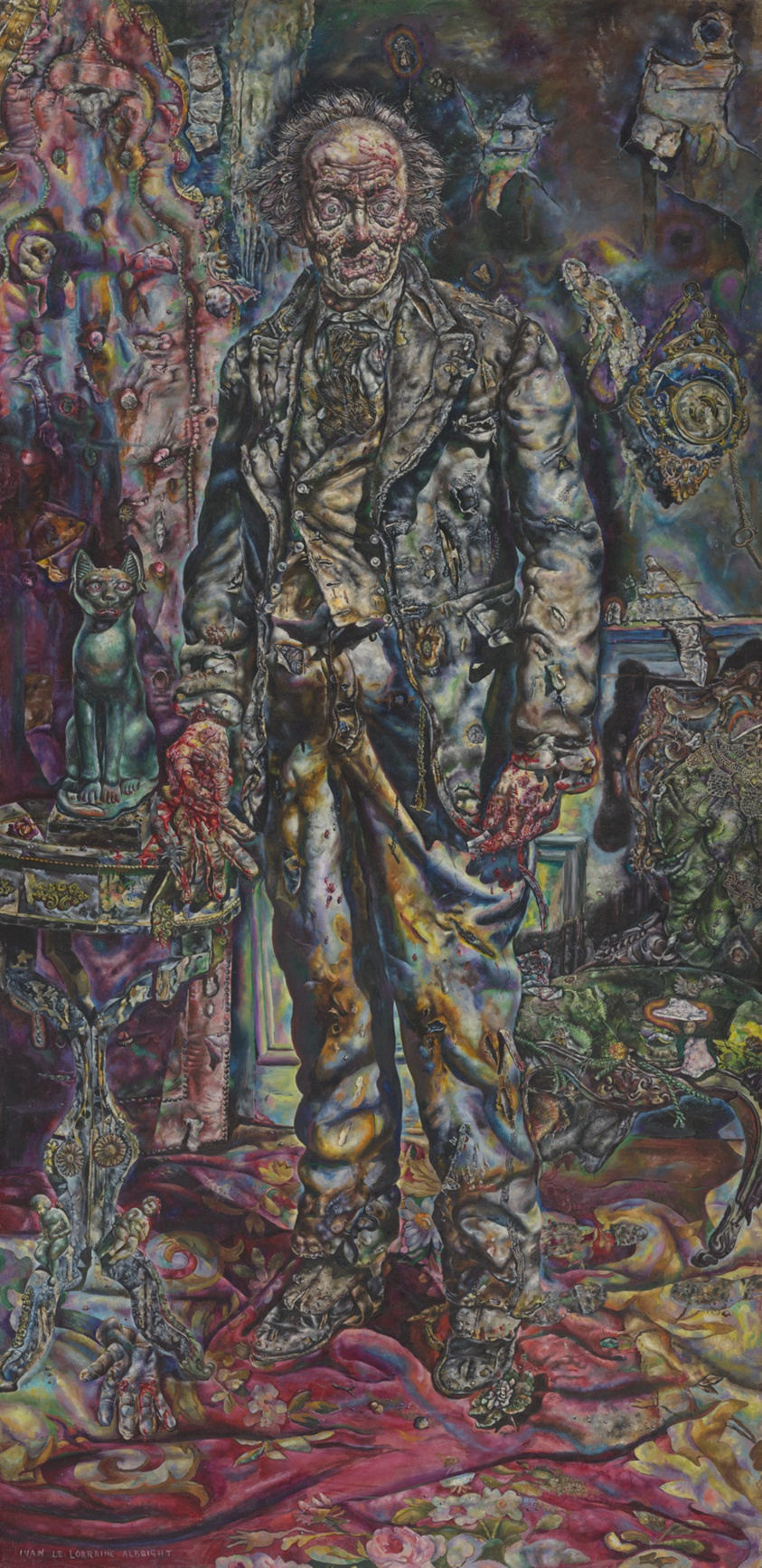
Albright's painting of Dorian Gray is in the film.

External audio
- Multimedia, Audio stop 728.mp3, Art Institute of Chicago

Two paintings of the character Dorian Gray were used in the film. The painting titled Picture of Dorian Gray used at the end of the film was painted on commission during the making of the film in 1943–1944 by Ivan Le Lorraine Albright, an American artist who was well known as a painter of the macabre. Created specifically for use in the film, it is now part of the collection of the Art Institute of Chicago. Albright painted and altered the picture while the movie was being made to allow it to represent the development of Dorian's character.

The portrait of Dorian Gray seen in the beginning of the film was painted by Henrique Medina, and is titled Portrait of Hurd Hatfield as Dorian Gray. It was originally sold at an MGM auction in 1970 when the contents of the studio were sold at a series of auctions lasting several months. It was then sold in a Butterfield and Butterfield Entertainment Memorabilia auction in 1997 for $17,250, and in 2015 it sold at Christie's, New York, for $149,000 and is believed to be in a private collection.

=== Music ===
The first piano piece played by Dorian to Sibyl is Frédéric Chopin's "Prelude No 24 in D minor". Played later in the Blue Gate Field house is Ludwig van Beethoven's "Moonlight Sonata".

== Reception ==
Since its release, The Picture of Dorian Gray has received positive reviews, with review aggregate site Rotten Tomatoes giving a 94% rating based on 16 reviews.

Leslie Halliwell gave it three of four stars: "Elegant variation on Dr Jekyll and Mr Hyde, presented in portentous style which suits the subject admirably." Leonard Maltin gave the film three and a half out of four stars in his Movie Guide: "Haunting Oscar Wilde story...Young Lansbury is poignant...Sanders leaves indelible impression as elegant heavy." The BBC in 2000 declared it, "Among the many film adaptations of Oscar Wilde's "The Picture of Dorian Gray", this 1945 MGM version is without a doubt the best. With a reputed budget of $2m, this is a film of handsome veneer under which lurks a macabre tale of greed and destruction." awarding it four out of five stars.

Film critic and author James Agee reviewed it in The Nation in 1945, "A good movie might have been made from The Picture of Dorian Gray. Albert Lewin's version is respectful, earnest, and I am afraid, dead." Likewise Pauline Kael gave it a mixed appraisal: "It has its ludicrous side ... But the Oscar Wilde story has its compelling gimmick and its cheap thrills, and despite the failing of Albert Lewin as writer and director, he has an appetite for decadence and plushy decor. Neither Hatfield, who tries scrupulously hard, nor George Sanders ... rises above Lewin's chic gothic conception ... But as Dorian's victim, gullible Sibyl Vane, the young Angela Lansbury gives her scenes true depth of feeling."

=== Box office ===
According to MGM records, the film earned $1,399,000 in the U.S. and Canada and $1,576,000 elsewhere, resulting in a loss of $26,000.

=== Awards and nominations ===
Year	Award	Result	Category	Recipient
1946	Academy Award	Nominated	Best Art Direction-Interior Decoration, Black-and-White	John Bonar, Cedric Gibbons, Hugh Hunt, Hans Peters and Edwin B. Willis
1946	Academy Award	Nominated	Best Supporting Actress	Angela Lansbury
1946	Academy Award	Won	Best Cinematography, Black-and-White	Harry Stradling (Note: This Oscar win for Cinematography is a rare demonstration of respect for a horror film.)
1946	Golden Globe Award	Won	Best Supporting Actress	Angela Lansbury
1996	Hugo Award	Won	Best Dramatic Presentation	Albert Lewin, Oscar Wilde
2009	Saturn Award	Won	Best DVD Classic Film Release	The Picture of Dorian Gray

- AFI's 100 Years...100 Thrills – No. 86
- AFI's 100 Years...100 Heroes and Villains:
  - Dorian Gray — Nominated Villain

== See also ==
- Adaptations of The Picture of Dorian Gray
