= Lawrence W. Butler =

American special effects artist (1908–1988)

- Born: July 30, 1908
- Died: October 19, 1988 (aged 80)
- Occupation: Special effects artist
- Years active: 1936–1973

Lawrence W. Butler (July 30, 1908 – October 19, 1988) was an American special effects artist, best known as the inventor of the bluescreening process. He won an Academy Award for Best Special Effects and was nominated for three more in the same category.

== Career ==
Butler's early career days were spent in the United States working for his father William Butler who worked in films as an optical effects director. He moved to England in the mid 1930s and landed his first independent job with the London Films working for the Hungarian-born producer/director Alexander Korda's chartbuster film Things to Come (1936). His first stint was to do films called The Man Who Could Work Miracles and Fire Over England.

What worked wonders for him was the innovative idea of introducing "blue-screen travelling matte process" in special effects, which he developed with his colleagues and implemented it in the Academy Award-winning film The Thief of Bagdad in 1940. He went back to the United States and Hollywood after this film and was nominated for another Academy Award in 1942 for special effects for The Jungle Book.

Butler then worked for Warner Bros., and did special effects for Casablanca. After the end of World War II, he worked for Columbia Pictures on films such as Gilda, The Lady from Shanghai and The Caine Mutiny. He retired in 1973 after his last film called Charley Varrick.

== Selected filmography ==
Butler won an Academy Award for Best Special Effects and was nominated for three more:

Won

- The Thief of Bagdad (1940)

Nominated

- That Hamilton Woman (1941)
- Jungle Book (1942)
- A Thousand and One Nights (1945)
