= Marzani & Munsell =

US book publisher

- Founded: 1954
- Founders: Carl Marzani; Angus Cameron (publisher)
- Country of origin: United States
- Headquarters location: New York City, New York, US
- Publication types: Books

Marzani & Munsell (1955–1967) was an American book publisher of the mid-20th Century, based in Manhattan, which published liberal and leftist books, starting with False Witness by Harvey Matusow.

== History ==
After release from prison in 1951, Carl Marzani joined Cameron Associates and partnered with Angus Cameron to run Liberty Book Club. Marzani & Munsell formed as a book club (in an unclear relationship with Alexander Ector Orr Munsell, "that unusual combination of a practicing Christian and a practicing Marxist" per Carl Marzani, and son and heir of Albert Henry Munsell) and also operated what had become the Library-Prometheus Book Club. Together, the two book clubs, with some 8,000 members, published and distributed many books following their progressive ideology.

In a later interview, Marzani described his publishing house:

We also had a very distinguished list – we had the first book on the Rosenbergs, the first book on FBI informers,^{a} the first book on black armed self-defense,^{b} and so on. We also had an outlet for the blacklisted writers – we published novels and other writings by Ring Lardner Jr.,^{c} Alvah Bessie, Abe Polonsky, Albert Maltz. We also did an enormous amount of pamphlets, four or five every year – on the Bay of Pigs, on Vietnam, the Warren Report – there wasn't a major issue we didn't put out something on. We were a major influence among two or three others – the National Guardian, Monthly Review – during the years I call the American resistance to McCarthyism.

In 1959 when Cameron left for at job at Knopf, Marzani became president. Marzani and Munsell publishing house "was destroyed in a mysterious fire" in 1966, ending the run of books, pamphlets, broadsheets and reprints. Marzani later described the loss: "It destroyed our stock, our lists, everything, and we had no insurance."

=== Alleged espionage ===
According to allegations made in 1994 by Oleg Kalugin, a retired KGB officer, Marzani was a contact for the Soviet secret police agency, the KGB, while running Marzani & Munsell, and the KGB subsidized his publishing house in the 1960s. Allegedly, the amounts were $15,000 in 1960, then a two-year grant in 1961 of $55,000.

== Legacy ==
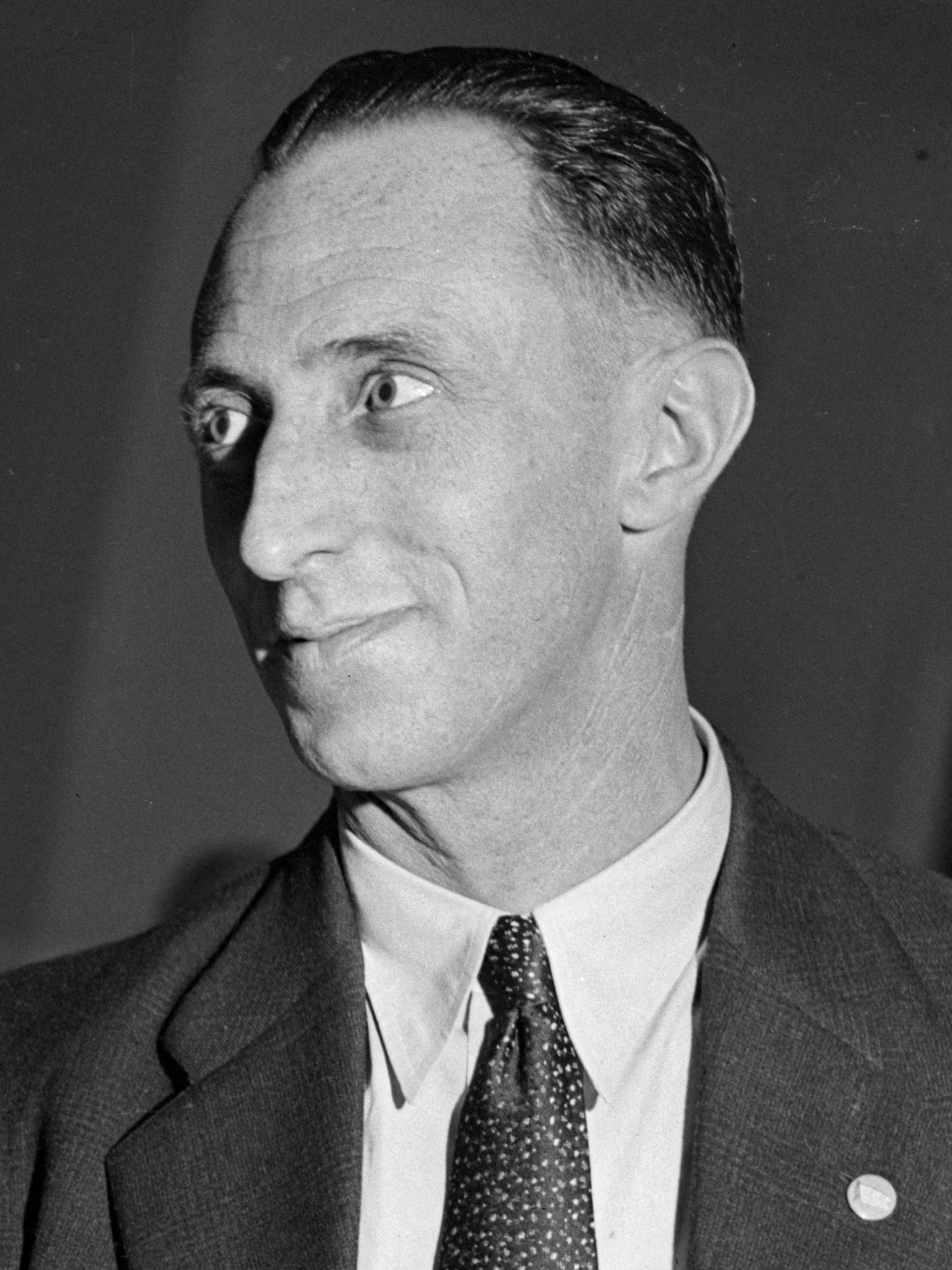
Harry Bridges (1935) corresponded with Marzani & Munsell

Tamiment Library at New York University houses papers of Marzani & Munsell, whose principle correspondents include: Angus Cameron (publisher), Herbert Aptheker, Calvin Benham Baldwin (aka "C.B. Baldwin" and "Beanie Baldwin"), Cedric Belfrage, Alvah Bessie, Herbert Biberman, Harry Bridges, E. Berry Burgum, W.E.B. Du Bois, Barrows Dunham, Howard Fast, Royal France, Stefan Heym, Albert E. Kahn, Ring Lardner Jr., Doris Lessing, Walter Lowenfels, Albert Maltz, A.J. Muste, Carey McWilliams (journalist), Truman J. Nelson, Victor Perlo, Edwin B. Smith, Edgar Snow, Joseph R. Starobin, Anna Louise Strong, Harry F. Ward, and Ella Winter.

== Titles ==
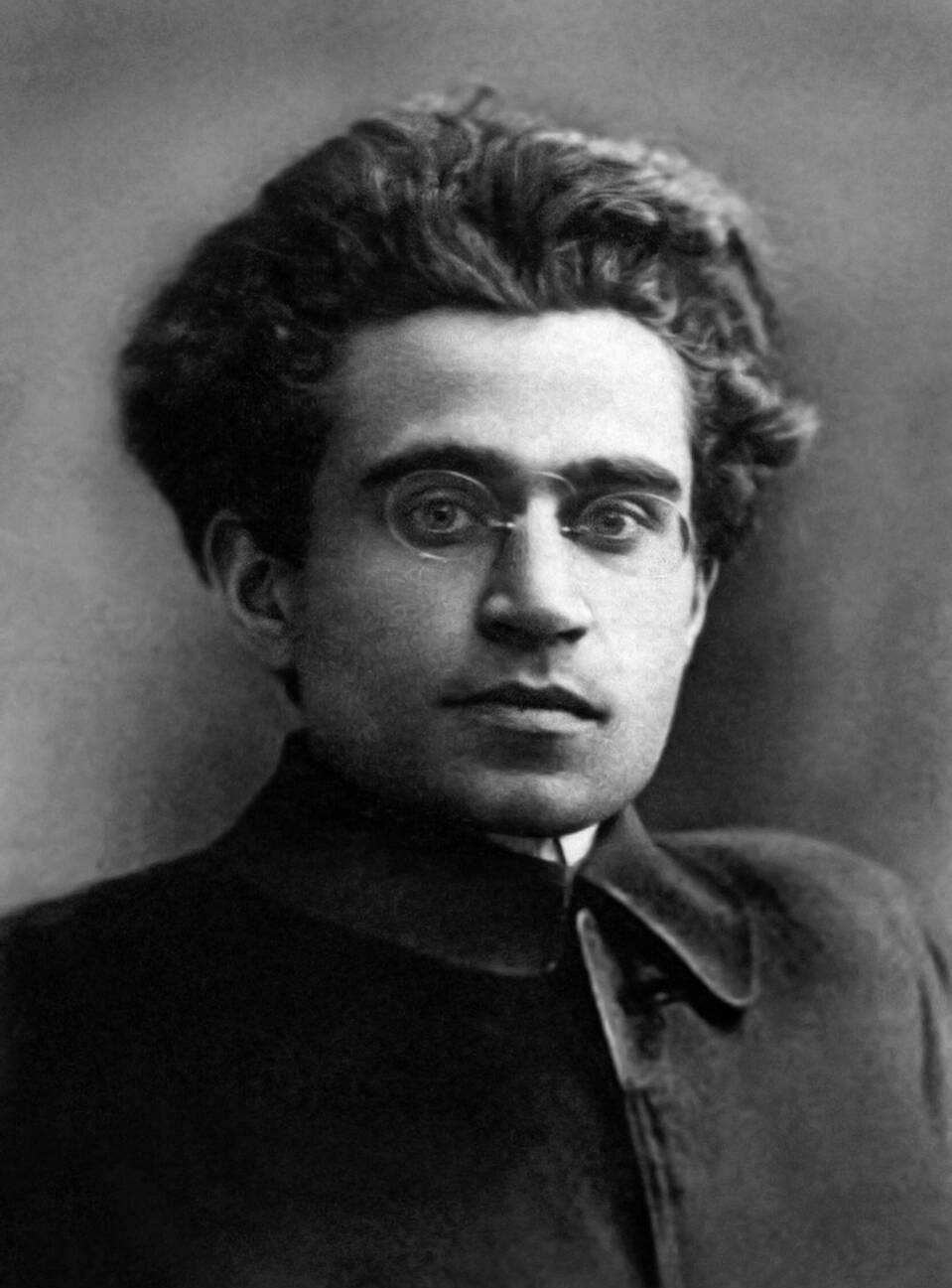
Marzani & Munsell published first USA translation of Antonio Gramsci's writings

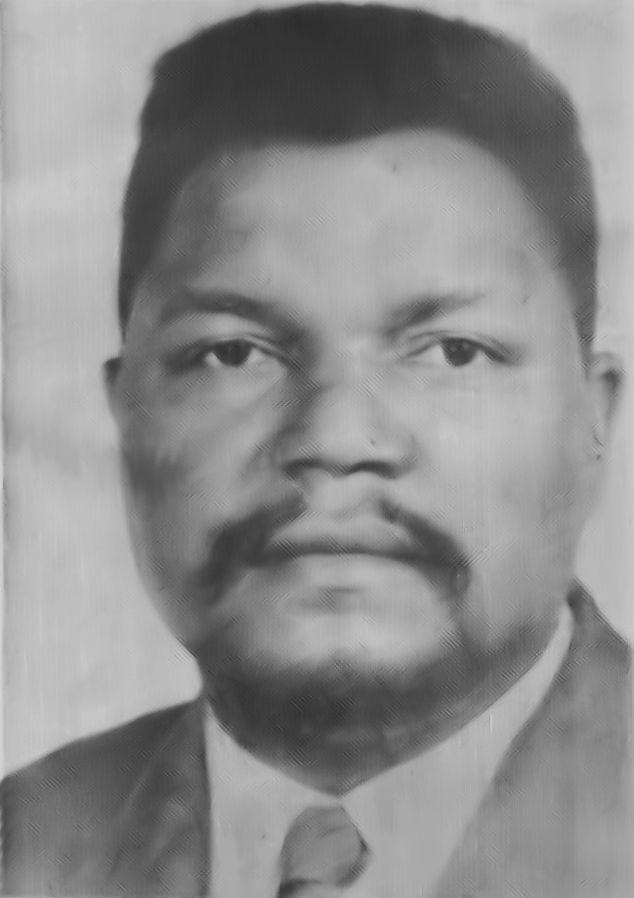
Marzani & Munsell published Robert F. Williams's Negroes with Guns.

- 1955:
  - False Witness
  - Labor's Untold Story)
- 1957:
  - The open Marxism of Antonio Gramsci
- 1959:
  - A visit to Soviet science
  - World without war
  - The doctor business
  - Comrade Venka
- 1960:
  - Inside the Khrushchev Era
  - The double bed from the feminine side
  - The tragedy of American diplomacy
  - The artist in society
  - The flowers of Hiroshima
  - The Rise of the People's Communes in China
  - The world of C. Wright Mills
- 1961:
  - The new Germany and the old Nazis
  - Cuba: prophetic island
  - War and peace, and the problem of Berlin
  - The road from Sharpeville
  - Dollars and Sense of Disarmament (1961)
  - Cuba versus CIA
- 1962:
  - The Era of McCarthyism
  - The Negro today
  - The Shelter Hoax and Foreign Policy
  - The political economy of growth
  - The adventurers
  - The military background to disarmament
  - Negroes with Guns
  - China, Russia and the U.S.A.
- 1963:
  - War and Peace in Vietnam
  - A quarter-century of un-Americana: a tragico-comical memorabilia of HUAC
  - Heusinger of the Fourth Reich
  - The golden fleece: selling the good life to Americans
  - People with strength in Monroe, North Carolina
  - Dragon pink on old white
- 1964:
  - The mood of the nation (November 22–29, 1963)
  - Oswald: assassin or fall guy?
  - Bitter end in Southeast Asia
  - The Yahoos
  - Goldwater-ism
  - The Goldwater coloring book
  - The Black Anglo-Saxons
  - Soul of the Republic: The Negro Today
- 1965:
  - The Conscience of the Senate on the Vietnam War (1965)
  - Gideon's Army
    - v. 1. The components of the decision
    - v. 2. The decision and the organization
    - v. 3. The campaign and the vote
  - Prosperity in crisis
  - Peace by finesse
  - A pictorial history of the Jews in the United States
  - Automation
  - Journey to the Soviet Trade Unions
  - Storm the gates of Jericho
  - What to do about Vietnam?
- 1966:
  - The gaps in the Warren report
  - Critical reactions to the Warren report
  - Concentration camps USA
  - Harlem stirs
  - German Hand on the Nuclear Trigger
  - The Silent Slaughter
  - Johnson's War

== Notable people ==
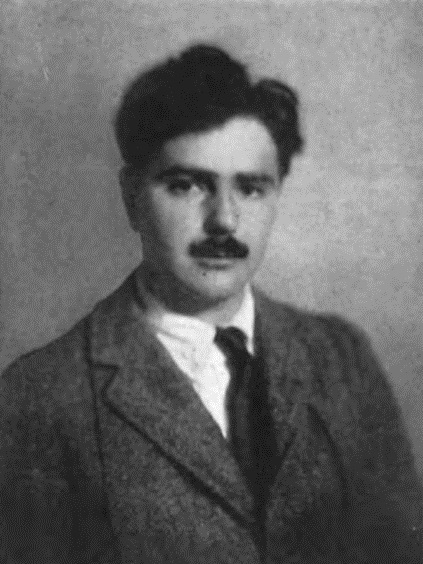
Marzani & Munsell published Cuba: Prophetic Island by Waldo Frank

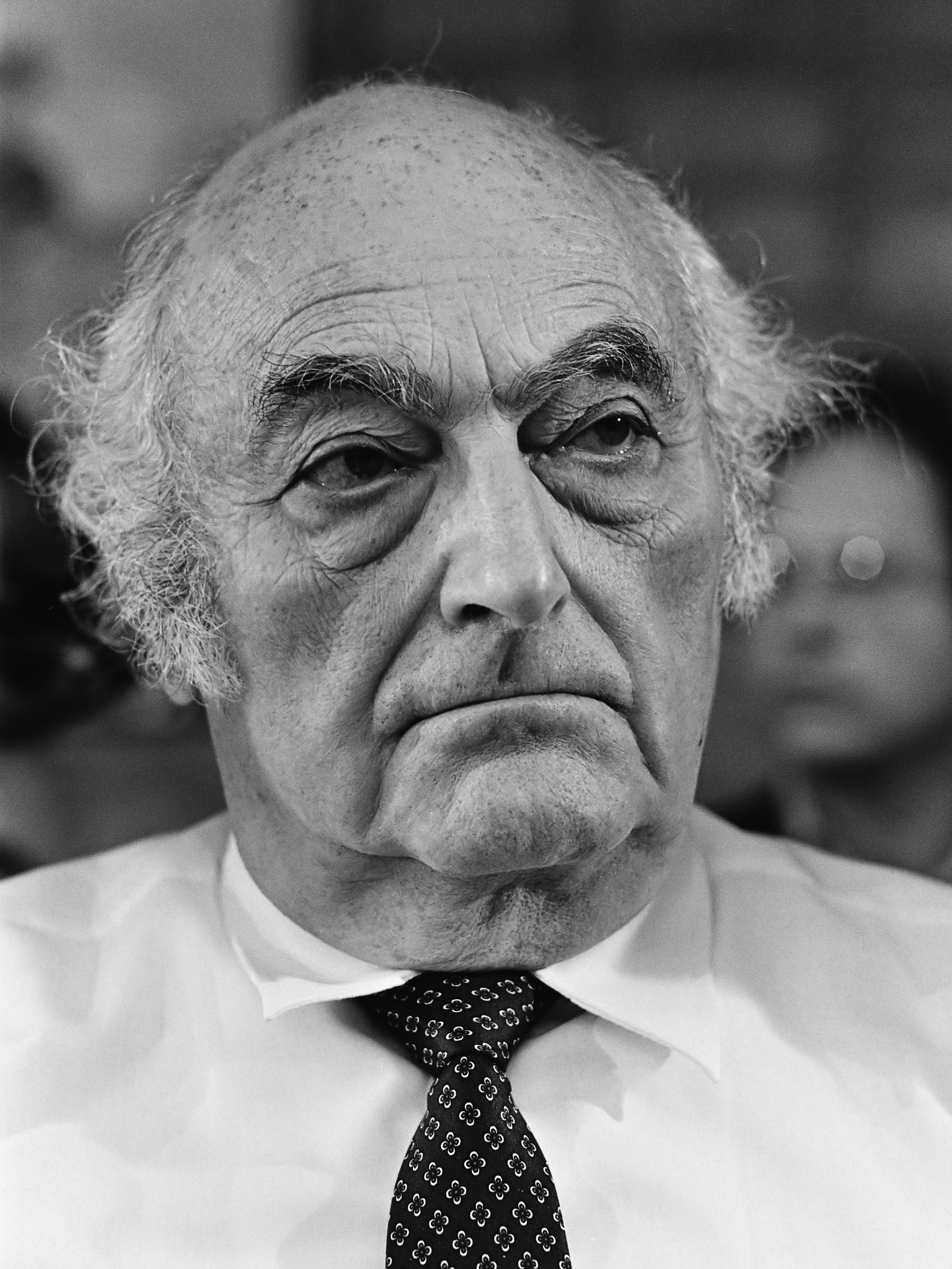
Marzani & Munsell published A visit to Soviet science by Stefan Heym

=== Officers ===
- Carl Marzani, President

=== Authors ===
- Charles R. Allen Jr.
- Herbert Aptheker
- Paul A. Baran
- J. D. Bernal
- Baron Blackett
- Patrick Blackett
- Phillip Bonosky
- Richard Owen Boyer
- Richard Carter
- Carl Dreher
- Barrows Dunham
- Abraham Feinberg
- Waldo David Frank
- Joseph M. Gillman
- Kumar Goshal
- Fred Halstead
- Nathan Hare
- Margot Heinemann
- Stefan Heym
- Leo Huberman
- Joachim Joesten
- Mark Lane (author)
- Martin Luther King Jr.
- Curtis D. MacDougall
- Andrew March
- Carl Marzani
- Harvey Matusow
- Eve Merriam
- Edita Morris
- Fred Warner Neal
- Truman J. Nelson
- Mike Newberry
- Pavel Nilin
- Eric Norden
- Victor Perlo
- Charlotte Pomerantz
- Bernard Sachs
- Joseph J.Seldin
- Morris Schappes
- Edgar Snow
- Joseph William Still
- Anna Louise Strong
- Paul Sweezy
- T.H. Tetens
- Robert F. Williams
- William Appleman Williams
- William Worthy
- Fred Wright (cartoonist)

=== Translators ===
- Joseph Fels Barnes
- Carl Marzani

== See also ==
- Angus Cameron (publisher)
- Albert E. Kahn
- Albert Henry Munsell
- Little, Brown and Company
- Alfred A. Knopf
- Boni & Liveright
- Dial Press

== Notes ==
^a Harvey Matusow's False Witness.
^b Robert F. Williams' Negroes with Guns.
^c Referring to Ring Lardner Jr.
