= Truman J. Nelson =

American historian

- Truman J. Nelson Reader
- Born: 1911
- Died: July 11, 1987 (aged 75–76)
- Occupations: Author, historian, activist
- Writing career
- Genre: Biography

Truman J. Nelson (1911 – 11 July 1987) was an American writer of historical novels and essays, a civil rights activist, and a curator. His literary works mainly dealt with subjects such as revolution and the "revolutionary morality" as well as anti-racism and the civil rights struggle in the United States.

== Career ==
Nelson was a factory worker until the age of forty, after which he completely devoted himself to the writing profession. He was relatively unknown after his death, except to parts of the Black American population. He was not always a highly regarded author in his lifetime. Nevertheless, writers like Seán O'Casey and W. E. B. Du Bois praised his work. Conrad Lynn said among other things that "you are probably the last white man who meant something for the black revolution."

== Death ==
Nelson died in Newburyport, Massachusetts, United States of heart failure.

== Works ==
Nelson wrote the introductory essay entitled "The Resistant Spirit" for Robert F. Williams' iconic book Negroes with Guns.

Nelson authored "People With Strength In Monroe, North Carolina." to raise funds for Robert F. Williams Monroe North Carolina NAACP Chapter

Books

- The Sin of the Prophet (Little, Brown, 1952)
- The Passion by the Brook (Doubleday, 1953)
- The Surveyor (Doubleday, 1960)
- People with Strength: The Story of Monroe, NC (1963)
- The Torture of Mothers (Beacon, 1968)
- The Right of Revolution (Beacon, 1968)
- Documents of Upheaval (Hill and Wang, 1966)
- The Old Man: John Brown at Harper's Ferry (Holt, Rinehart & Winston, 1973)
