= A. E. Kahn =

A. E. Kahn may refer to:

- Alfred E. Kahn (1917–2010), American professor and expert in airline regulation
- Albert E. Kahn (1912–1979), American journalist and socialist
