= Radio Free Dixie =

Cuban radio program directed towards Americans

Radio Free Dixie was a radio program broadcast from Cuba by American civil rights leader Robert F. Williams in the early 1960s that advocated for racial equality. It called on Black Americans to rise up against what Williams saw as an inherently racist system. The radio program featured music, political conversation, and storytelling.

== History ==
=== Robert Williams ===
Robert Williams was born on February 26, 1925, in Union County, Monroe, North Carolina. Growing up in Monroe, Williams faced the extremes of southern racism. One documentation from a 1939 Monroe newspaper reported a Ku Klux Klan rally with a potential 5,000 attending members. During these trying times, Williams was inspired by his headstrong relatives. His uncle Charlie Williams and grandmother Ellen Williams were known in town for putting their foot down for what they believed in. Individuals like these propelled Williams to be involved in his community.

Throughout William's life he became deeply involved with advocating for the black community. In 1953, he became president of the Monroe chapter of the NAACP. In 1959, he launched The Crusader weekly newspaper, a newspaper for black America.

Eventually, after years of activism, Williams and his family were exiled to Havana, Cuba, after heated disputes with the government. At that point, Williams was considered to be a black nationalist.

=== Timeline of Radio Free Dixie ===
In 1961, Freedom Riders came traveling through Monroe, North Carolina, Williams's hometown. He and his wife agreed to shelter some of the activists, a white family, who were beaten and bloodied by local Klansmen. When local law enforcement was alerted about this, they wrongfully charged Williams with kidnapping the family, even though he was only trying to shelter them from violence. To escape imprisonment, or perhaps worse, he and his family fled the country to Cuba.

During William's exile to Cuba from Monroe, North Carolina, he aired Radio Free Dixie from 1961 to 1965. Cuba was in the midst of the Cold War, with the Cuban Missile Crisis on the rise. No doubt, the spirit of revolution in Cuba fueled Williams's launch, and his general acceptance in Cuba. In fact, Fidel Castro not only granted Williams permission to seek shelter in Cuba, but also allowed him to broadcast his revolutionary radio program. Other Cuban revolutionaries pushed back on Williams's ideas, claiming they excluded white workers from the struggle. This prevented Radio Free Dixie's creation until Castro himself ordered radio officials to allow the station on the air.

Radio Free Dixie broadcast soul music, including tunes like Herbie Hancock's "Watermelon Man" and Nina Simone's "Mississippi Goddam," news, and commentary from Havana. Besides playing jazz and blues music, Williams frequently played "new jazz music" as a method of "psychological propaganda." Newer jazz music was thought to be extremely motivating and mobilizing to those who listened, and Williams wanted his audience to rise up against white supremacy. Williams would strategically play specific types of music while news on voter registration or other political issues were being reported on. Inspired by a childhood of storytelling, so too was the broadcast. The Radio featured characters like political leftists who would come on air and share their stories in government. These stories became condensed into a transcript called, "Negroes with Guns" that was widely known in the movement, and had a play based on it. This transcript advocated for nonviolent direct action. While Williams believed in nonviolence, he differed from Martin Luther King Jr. in believing that white supremacists may eventually become numb to its effects.

Williams said, "This was really the first true radio where the black people could say what they want to say and they don't have to worry about sponsors, they don't have to worry about censors." One listener from Los Angeles in 1962 said, "Every time I play my copy, I let someone else make another recording. That way more people will hear the true story of Monroe."

The program reached the entire continental United States using 50,000 watts at 690 kHz AM, and ran at 11p.m. Eastern time. "Radio Free Dixie is proud to present the seldom-heard songs of brutal oppression and dehumanization that no American radio station dares broadcast," an announcer touted. Amid the climate of the 1965 Watts riots, Williams used the station to call for assertive action: "In the spirit of 76, in the Spirit of Los Angeles, let our people take to the streets in fierce numbers, and in the cause of freedom and justice, let our battle cry be heard around the world. Freedom! Freedom! Freedom now, or death!"

While the broadcast reached America across the map, Williams was sure to advocate for the fact that it was targeted to southern blacks specifically, because they really had no other voice in the movement, according to Williams. Hence, the name of the station, "Radio Free Dixie" because it was intended for the Southern Dixie states. William's broadcast was revolutionary and not something America had ever heard before. It was the kind of school of thought that would most likely not have been broadcast from the United States with Williams often advocating for radical ideals like a militant community saying things like, "If we are ever going to be free, we must liberate ourselves."

Bootleg tapes of the program circulated throughout the United States, and recordings of Radio Free Dixie were also aired on WBAI in New York City and KPFA in Berkeley, California.

Programming ended in 1965 when Williams visited China at Mao Zedong's invitation. In 1970 he returned to the United States.
