= War Department Report =

1943 film

- Directed by: Carl Marzani
- Written by: David Zablodowsky
- Produced by: Carl Marzani
- Narrated by: Walter Huston
- Edited by: Richard Lyford
- Production company: Office of Strategic Services
- Release date: December 7, 1943
- Running time: 47 minutes
- Country: United States
- Language: English

War Department Report is a 1943 American documentary film directed by Carl Marzani. It was nominated for an Academy Award for Best Documentary Feature.

The film's primary intended audience was war workers; it consisted of "battle footage, analysis of Axis military and industrial strength, and pep talks about America's superior resources." Some of the footage came from John Ford's Field Photo section of the Office of Strategic Services.

The Academy Film Archive preserved War Department Report in 2012. The film is part of the Academy War Film Collection, one of the largest collections of World War II era short films held outside government archives.
