= Kissing Case =

1958 North Carolina criminal case

The young boys James Thompson and David Simpson with Kelly Alexander of the NAACP in Wadesboro, North Carolina, in January 1959

The Kissing Case was the arrest, conviction and lengthy sentencing of two prepubescent African-American boys in 1958 in Monroe, North Carolina, United States. A white girl kissed each of them on the cheek and later told her mother, who accused the boys of rape. The boys were then charged by authorities with molestation. Civil rights activists became involved in representing the boys. The boys were arrested in October 1958, separated from their parents for a week, beaten and threatened by investigators, then sentenced by a juvenile court judge.

Leaders and members of the local NAACP, including Robert F Williams, and other civil rights organizations such as the New York-based Committee to Combat Racial Injustice (CCRI), protested the charges, trial and sentencing. The United States was embarrassed by protests from other governments, demonstrations in major cities, and strong criticism in the international press.

At the urging of former first lady Eleanor Roosevelt, President Dwight D. Eisenhower took action behind the scenes to pressure North Carolina Governor Luther H. Hodges to intervene. Hodges finally granted clemency to the boys, releasing them from the reformatory in early 1959 after they had been there for three months. Neither he nor authorities in Monroe ever officially apologized to the boys or their families.

== Incident ==
On October 28, 1958, Sissy Marcus, a 7- or 8-year-old white girl (sources vary), told her mother she had kissed 9-year-old James "Hanover" Thompson, and 7-year-old David "Fuzzy" Simpson, on their cheeks. She had seen them with other children and recognized James as a friend from Sissy's earlier childhood. The two had played together when James accompanied his mother to her work as a domestic for the Marcus family. The boys were African American.

When Sissy told her mother Bernice Marcus about the encounter, Bernice became enraged, washed her daughter's mouth with lye, and called the police to accuse the boys of raping her daughter. Sissy's father left the home with a shotgun, but the police found the boys first and arrested them.

== Context ==
As was happening in other cities and towns across the South, in the postwar period African Americans began to press to regain their civil rights and social justice. Many men had served the United States during World War II and, especially in the South, they resented returning to find out they were expected to submit to being second-class citizens. In Monroe, North Carolina, Marine veteran Robert F. Williams agreed to be president and Dr. Albert E. Perry, a physician and veteran, to be vice-president of the local chapter of the NAACP. They conducted meetings and demonstrations while seeking integration in the city of public facilities legally segregated by the state legislature after it had disenfranchised most blacks in the state at the turn of the century. In the late 1950s, they were still excluded from politics, although there had been some voter registration drives.

Williams and Perry specifically called for integration of the swimming pool at the Monroe Country Club; although located on private grounds, the pool was a public facility, built with federal funds during the Great Depression. It was operated with city funds raised by taxes on all residents. Perry and Williams argued that since all citizens in Monroe were taxed for the pool's operation, all should be able to use it. Following these activities, a "large, heavily-armed" Ku Klux Klan motorcade, led by James W. "Catfish" Cole, had attacked Perry's home.

Harry Golden, in a 1959 article entitled "Monroe, North Carolina and the 'Kissing Case,'" said that such attempts to desegregate the pool were "unwise", "naive" and "unrealistic" because of the "crude emotions of a small agricultural community." In Monroe, white parents did not want their children to swim or play with black children.

== Events ==
The young boys were detained for six days without access to their parents or legal counsel. They were handcuffed and beaten in a lower-level cell of the police station. A few days later Juvenile Judge Hampton Price found them guilty, saying "since they just stood silent and didn't say nothin', I knew that was a confession of guilt." Price sentenced them to reform school, perhaps until the age of 21.

The North Carolina chapter of the NAACP raised funds to hire an experienced lawyer and appeal their case. The national office had not wanted to enter the case, as they were working on litigation challenges to law, such as barriers to voter registrations. Following the boys' arrests, their mothers had been fired from their jobs as domestics, and the NAACP relocated them to nearby towns for their safety.

Civil rights leader Robert F. Williams, head of the Monroe chapter of the NAACP, raised protests about the arrests and sentencing. Williams called Conrad Lynn, a noted black civil rights lawyer from New York, who came to aid in the boys' defense. Former First Lady Eleanor Roosevelt tried to talk with the North Carolina governor. At first the local and state governments refused to back down in the case. Governor Luther H. Hodges and state attorney general Malcolm B. Seawell, who was appointed by Hodges, traveled to Monroe to prosecute the boys. He rejected Lynn's writ (on behalf of Williams) to review their detention.

The mothers of the two boys were not allowed to see their children for weeks. It became an international cause célèbre: Joyce Egginton, a journalist with the News Chronicle (United Kingdom), got permission to visit the boys and took their mothers along, traveling with Dr. Albert Perry and Robert Williams. One of the men took a camera and photographed both boys, showing Fuzzy hugging his mother and talking with the journalist. Due to the alleged crime and the distance of the reformatory from Monroe, some 80 miles, the boys had not been allowed any contact with their mothers for weeks. The News Chronicle ran Egginton's story of the children's reunion with their mothers and the photographs on its front page December 18, 1958, under the headline, "The Negro children in jail for a kiss". Her coverage of the case, which included several articles written between November 1958 and January 1960, was syndicated across Europe. The United States Information Agency reported receiving more than 12,000 letters regarding the case, with most people expressing outrage at the arrests.

An international committee was formed in Europe to defend Thompson and Simpson. Huge demonstrations against the US over this case were held in Paris, Rome, Vienna, and Rotterdam; in the latter city, protesters stoned the US Consulate. The US government suffered international embarrassment and shaming. In February 1959, North Carolina officials asked the boys' mothers to sign a waiver to obtain the release of their children. It would have required the boys to admit to being guilty of the charges, and the mothers refused to sign.

Two days later, after the boys had spent three months in detention, the governor pardoned Thompson and Simpson without conditions or explanation. The state and city never apologized to the boys or their families for their treatment. Their lives were overturned. Commenting on it in 2011, Brenda Lee Graham, Thompson's sister, said that he was never the same after these events.

According to historian Allida M. Black, President Dwight D. Eisenhower had responded to entreaties from Eleanor Roosevelt to intervene. He had reportedly telephoned governor Hodges, demanding that he "put a stop to this persecution".

== Ku Klux Klan ==
During this time, no judge from North Carolina would overrule Price. Members of the local Ku Klux Klan burned crosses in front of the boys' families' houses, and some people shot at the houses. The Monroe KKK chapter was strong and an estimated 7,000 Klan members attended a Klan meeting near Monroe, a city with total population of only 12,000.

In a National Public Radio interview in 2011, members of the Thompson family said they still remembered "sweep[ing] bullets off [their] front porch" and the "burning crosses" in their yards.

== Committee to Combat Racial Injustice ==
In December 1958 the Committee to Combat Racial Injustice (CCRI) was formed in New York City with NAACP's Robert F. Williams as Chairman and civil rights activist George Weissman – pen name George Lavan – as secretary. On behalf of the two boys, they conducted "fund-raising, helping to secure legal counsel, and soliciting public and private moral support." These efforts contributed to the pressure for the boys to be freed and their pardon early in 1959. The committee's founders included Dr. Albert E. Perry, v-p of the Monroe NAACP chapter; L. E. Austin, editor of the Carolina Times; Conrad Lynn, New York attorney active in civil rights cases; and Reverend C. K. Steele of Tallahassee, Florida. Weissman's account of the case was published in The Nation on January 17, 1959.

== Role of North Carolina Governor Luther H. Hodges ==
Although he was "embarrassed by the international press coverage to eventually pardon the children, Governor Hodges "refused to apologize for [the State of North Carolina's] harsh treatment" of the children.
