= Angus Cameron (publisher) =

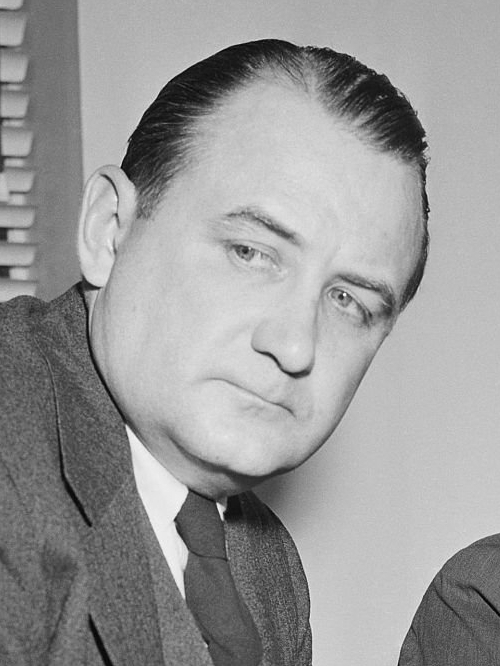
- Cameron in 1955
- Born: Donald Angus Cameron; December 25, 1908; Indianapolis, Indiana, U.S.
- Died: November 18, 2002 (aged 93); Charlottesville, Virginia, U.S.
- Education: DePauw University
- Employer(s): Bobbs-Merrill, Little, Brown, Cameron & Associates, Knopf
- Known for: Discovering J.D. Salinger, publishing Harvey Matusow
- Notable work: Publishing of The Joy of Cooking, Catcher in the Rye, False Witness
- Spouse: Sheila K Cameron
- Children: 2

Donald Angus Cameron (December 25, 1908 – November 18, 2002), publicly known by his middle name, was an American book editor and publisher. Cameron scored his first success handling The Joy of Cooking by Irma Rombauer for Indianapolis publisher Bobbs-Merrill Company in 1936. He moved to Little, Brown and Company in 1938.

While editor at Little, Brown, Cameron was responsible for the promotion of then-unknown writer J. D. Salinger, controversial poet Ogden Nash, and various left wing authors including Lillian Hellman, Howard Fast, and Carey McWilliams. In 1947 the politically radical Cameron became a public target of red-baiting led by historian Arthur Schlesinger Jr. over Little, Brown's refusal to publish Animal Farm by George Orwell. He was ultimately forced out at Little, Brown in 1951 over controversy surrounding the proposed publication of Communist author Howard Fast's novel Spartacus.

Following his departure from Little, Brown, Cameron found himself blacklisted from the mainstream publishing industry due to the pervasive climate of McCarthyism. In 1953 Cameron formed his own left wing publishing house, Cameron Associates, later joining forces with radical publisher Albert E. Kahn to launch the publishing house Cameron and Kahn. The blacklisting of Cameron ended only in 1959 when New York publisher Alfred A. Knopf hired him as a senior editor.

== Background ==
Donald Angus Cameron, known as "Angus," was born to a Scottish-American family in Indianapolis, Indiana, on December 25, 1908.

Following his graduation from high school, Cameron attended DePauw University in Greencastle, Indiana, from which he graduated with honors in History and Political Science in 1930. While at DePauw Cameron was introduced to radical political ideas, attending meetings of the Communist Party-affiliated John Reed Club. Although sympathetic to those who thought communism might be the answer to the devastation of the Great Depression, Cameron never joined the Communist Party, according to his biographer, Jonathan Coleman.

== Career ==
After graduation Cameron worked briefly as a salesman for a soft drink and candy company, discovering an affinity as a salesman.

=== Bobbs-Merrill ===
Cameron took a job with Indianapolis publisher Bobbs-Merrill Company, working as a book editor. It was there that he edited the self-published cooking manual The Joy of Cooking by Irma Rombauer — a book which became a massive best-seller in the United States and around the world.

=== Little, Brown ===
In 1938 Cameron moved to Little, Brown and Company. At Little, Brown Cameron edited young novelist J. D. Salinger, where he was credited for helping to persuade the elusive Salinger to allow publication of his photograph on the dust jacket of the first edition of his seminal novel Catcher in the Rye.

Cameron was a rising star as an editor at Little, Brown and in 1943 was named the company's editor-in-chief and vice president.

=== McCarthyism ===
In 1947 historian Arthur Schlesinger Jr., author of the Little, Brown-published survey, The Age of Jackson, brought a copy of British writer George Orwell's bitter anti-Stalinist allegory Animal Farm in to the publisher for consideration. When the book was rejected by Little, Brown, the anti-Communist Schlesinger held Cameron responsible, beginning a campaign for his removal.

Schlesinger wrote in protest against Cameron to the head of Little, Brown and inspired the American Legion, conservative newspaper columnist George Sokolsky, and the anti-Communist weekly Counterattack to focus upon the editor. Counterattack listed 31 authors from Little, Brown's stable as "fellow travelers" and intimated that the entire publishing house was little more than a "Communist front." The publication's entire August 31, 1951, edition was dedicated to an effort to expose the purported radical sympathies of the firm.

The attack by Counterattack was preceded by public testimony on August 22, 1951, by former Daily Worker editor Louis Budenz before the United States Senate Internal Security Subcommittee asserting direct knowledge that Cameron was a member of the Communist Party. This provided the impetus for a meeting of the Little, Brown board of directors dedicated to Cameron and his plans to publish the novel Spartacus by Communist author Howard Fast. Little, Brown instructed Cameron to clear all his outside political activities with the company. Asserting that such a restriction was one which "no free publishing house ought to require of its editor," Cameron refused, instead resigning his position as editor-in-chief of the firm.

=== Cameron & Associates ===
In 1952, finding himself locked out of the mainstream publishing industry for his political sentiments, Cameron established a publishing house of his own, Cameron and Associates. In 1954, the filmmaker, Office of Strategic Services (OSS) veteran, radical writer and former Communist Carl Marzani joined Cameron Associates, partnering with Angus Cameron to run Liberty Book Club; this grew into the Marzani & Munsell publishing house. Cameron later joined forces with similarly marginalized and blacklisted book editor Albert E. Kahn to form the publishing house Cameron and Kahn. The pair published a number of non-fiction titles, including a 1955 book by ex-FBI informant Harvey Matusow entitled False Witness, in which Matusow confessed to having made false accusations of Communist Party affiliation against approximately 200 people.

Cameron and Kahn also published such controversial works as Seeds of Destruction: The Truth About the US Occupation of Germany by Cedric Belfrage (1954) and John Wexley's critical take on the Rosenberg Case, The Judgment of Julius and Ethel Rosenberg (1955).

=== Knopf ===
As the 1950s came to a close and with the national hysteria about an underground communist conspiracy largely abated, the talented Cameron was no longer considered persona non-grata with the publishing industry. In 1959 he was hired as a senior editor by New York City publisher Alfred A. Knopf.

Cameron tried his own hand at writing, producing the book The Nightwatchers (1972), a work which drew upon his interest in owls, and was co-author of The L.L. Bean Game And Fish Cookbook, published in 1983.

Through much of his career, Cameron had sought a good biography of Wyatt Earp. During the 1990s, he worked with journalist Casey Tefertiller and wrote the foreword for Wyatt Earp: The Life Behind the Legend. Cameron's advice and insight greatly contributed to the quality of this book.

== Personal life and death ==
Cameron married Sheila K. MacNiven. Their marriage lasted 62 years (until her death in 1998); they had two children.

Cameron died age 93 November 18, 2002, in Charlottesville, Virginia.

== Legacy ==
Cameron's biographer, Jonathan Coleman, is in the process of writing What He Stood For: The Courage and Many Worlds of Angus Cameron.

Cameron left 10 reels of oral history audio tape with Columbia University in New York City, transcribed into 640 pages. The material deals with aspects of Cameron's biography, including his childhood, editorial stints with Bobbs-Merrill and Little, Brown, his appearances before various congressional committees, and anecdotes about various literary figures with whom he dealt during his career, including C. S. Forester, Ogden Nash and Norman Mailer.

== Works ==
- Publisher on Trial, a Symposium: The Case of Alexander Trachtenberg (1952)
- The Nightwatchers (1972)
- The L.L. Bean Game And Fish Cookbook with Judith Jones (1983)

== See also ==
- Bobbs-Merrill Company
- Little, Brown and Company
- Alfred A. Knopf
- Counterattack (newsletter)
- The Joy of Cooking
- Catcher in the Rye
- Jonathan Coleman (author)
