= Negroes with Guns: Rob Williams and Black Power =

2004 documentary film

Negroes with Guns: Rob Williams and Black Power is a 2004 feature film by directors Sandra Dickson and Churchill Roberts. It was a National PBS Broadcast, on Independent Lens, in February 2006. The film won the 2006 Erik Barnouw Award for Outstanding Historical Documentary, of the Organization of American Historians, the Audience Award of the Detroit Docs Film Festival, in 2005, and the Critic's Award for Outstanding Feature Documentary of the New York UrbanWorld Film Festival, in 2005.

The documentary film is the life story of Robert F. Williams, his role in the US civil rights movement, his exiles to Cuba and China, and his return from China. It also contains witness testimonies of many of the events described in Williams' 1962 book Negroes with Guns.

In a 2006 interview, filmmaker-director Sandra Dickson said: "It's a relatively unknown story of an individual who's really the forefather of the black power movement, who laid the intellectual foundation for the Panthers and others. I think also it's this dramatic David vs. Goliath story. This man was a local community activist, whose actions would propel him and his cause onto a national and international stage."

A review in Variety concluded: "What promises to offer a missing link in the chain between the 1950s’ non-violent civil rights movement and the 1960s’ militant black liberation movement isn't quite delivered in Negroes With Guns: Rob Williams and Black Power."

The book Negroes with Guns and the film are part of on-going societal discussion about Black history in America.
