= Carl Marzani =

Italian-American political activist (1912–1994)

Carl Aldo Marzani
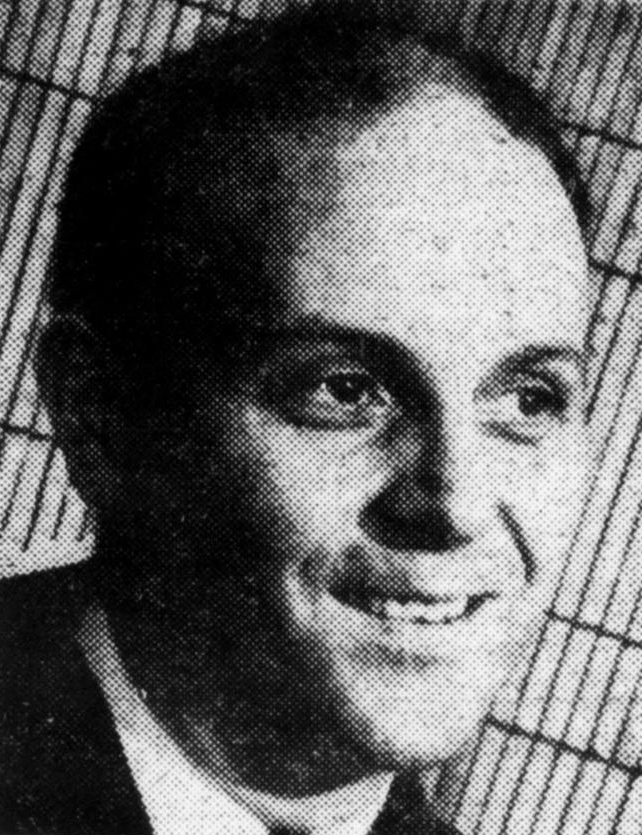
- Marzani c. 1952
- Born: March 4, 1912; Rome, Kingdom of Italy
- Died: December 11, 1994 (aged 82); New York City, U.S.
- Education: Williams College (B.A., 1935); Oxford University (B.A., 1938)
- Occupations: Economist, intelligence analyst, film producer, author, publisher, landlord
- Years active: 1936–1980s
- Known for: Documentary films
- Political party: Socialist (1931–1936); Communist (1939–1941); Progressive (1948)
- Other political affiliations: Communist Party of Great Britain (1937–1939)
- Criminal charges: Defrauding U.S. government
- Spouse(s): Edith Eisner (m. 1937; div. 1966) Charlotte Pomerantz (m. 1966)
- Children: 4
- Military career
- Allegiance: Spanish Republic; United States
- Branch: International Brigades; Office of the Coordinator of Information; Office of Strategic Services
- Service years: 1936–1937; 1942–1945
- Unit: Durruti Column
- Conflicts: Spanish Civil War; Aragon Front; World War II

Signature
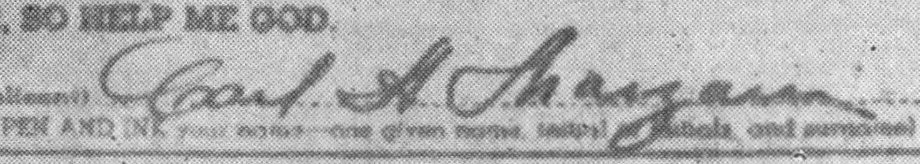

Carl Aldo Marzani (March 4, 1912 – December 11, 1994) was an Italian-born American political activist with a series of careers as a volunteer soldier in the Spanish Civil War, organizer for the Communist Party USA (CPUSA), United States intelligence official, documentary filmmaker with an Academy Award nomination, author, and publisher. During World War II he served in the federal intelligence agency, the Office of Strategic Services (OSS), and later the U.S. Department of State. He picked the targets for the Doolittle Raid on Tokyo, which took place on April 18, 1942. Marzani served nearly three years in prison for having concealed his former CPUSA membership when joining the American war effort in 1942.

== Background ==
Carl Aldo Marzani was born on March 4, 1912, in Rome, Italy. The family immigrated to the United States in 1924 and settled in Scranton, Pennsylvania. Carl entered the first grade at the age of twelve, not knowing English. He graduated from high school in 1931 with a scholarship to Williams College. There, Marzani became a Socialist and joined the League for Industrial Democracy. He began writing and became the editor of the school's literary magazine. In 1935, he graduated summa cum laude from Williams College with a BA in English. Marzani thereupon moved to New York. In 1936 he received a Moody fellowship to Oxford University.

== Career ==
When the Spanish Civil War broke out, Marzani left Oxford to participate as a volunteer in the Spanish Republican Army. He served with the Durruti Column, a unit of the anarchist wing of the Republican forces, during late 1936 and early 1937. His advocacy of military discipline raised suspicion that he was a communist, and thereby an adversary of the anarchists in the Republican struggle. Slated for execution as a communist threat to the anarchist unit, he left for Barcelona. In Spain, Marzani was impressed by what he had seen of the communists, but not by the anarchists.

In 1937 Marzani returned to Oxford and married Edith Eisner (stage name Edith Emerson). Then Abraham Lazarus brought him into the Communist Party of Great Britain (CPGB), which Eisner joined with him. Marzani became CPGB's treasurer of the South Midlands district. Returning to university studies, he received a BA in Modern Greats, (Philosophy, Politics, Economics) from Oxford in June 1938.

That summer, Marzani and his wife hitch-hiked around the world, visiting India, Indochina, China, Japan, and Europe. Through Communist Party contacts, they were able to meet Jawaharlal Nehru and other radical figures. Marzani later wrote that the immediate effect of his conversation with Nehru "was to broaden my horizons, show me the relationship between the industrial revolution and colonialism, revise my understanding of both, and give me a solid grounding in the economics of imperialism."

After their world tour, the Marzanis returned to the United States, and went on relief, the New Deal term for government assistance. Soon they got jobs with the New Deal program, the Works Progress Administration (WPA). The WPA assigned Marzani to teach economics at New York University. Marzani joined the Communist Party USA on August 25, 1939, two days after the Nazi-Soviet Pact was signed, under the alias Tony Wales. An informant wrote that he was also known later by this name "in party circles".

While a WPA instructor at New York University, he served as district organizer for the Communist Party on the Lower East Side of New York. After the German invasion of the Soviet Union in mid 1941, Marzani became director of a popular front anti-fascist organization, and resigned from the Communist Party in August 1941.

In early 1942 after the United States became involved in World War II, Marzani went to Washington, D.C. to help in the war effort. As an economist, he soon found his way to the Economic Division of the Research and Analysis branch of the Office of the Coordinator of Information. Both the head of the Economics Division and his assistant knew of Marzani from Williams College days. The same year, this group was renamed the Office of Strategic Services (OSS). It was the predecessor organization of the Central Intelligence Agency (CIA). Marzani did not hide his Marxist orientation but stated that he had left CPUSA, which satisfied enough of his OSS colleagues.

At the OSS, Marzani worked under Colonel William J. Donovan from 1942 to 1945 in the Analysis Branch. A 1943 Venona Project decryption of Soviet espionage cable traffic reported on an American code-named Kollega ("Colleague"), recruited by Eugene Dennis, who later became CPUSA General Secretary. The message described Kollega as working at the "Photographic Section Pictural Devision [sic]", interpreted by the U.S. analysts as "probably the Pictures Division of the News and Features Bureau of the Office of War Information" (OWI). Several authors have speculated that Kollega was Marzani, though it has been disputed. Another posited code name for Marzani was NORD. In 1945 Marzani transferred to the Department of State, where he worked as the deputy chief of the Presentation Division of the Office of Intelligence. Marzani handled the preparation of top secret reports.

After the war, the OSS was split up. Marzani's branch was moved to the State Department, where he was the deputy chief of the Presentation Division of the Office of Intelligence.

In 1946 Marzani founded and directed Union Films, a film documentary company that had contracts with the United Electrical, Radio and Machine Workers of America (UE) and other unions to do documentaries. One film entitled Deadline for Action, was released in September 1946, five weeks before Marzani resigned from the State Department. The film "severely criticized powerful corporations such as General Electric and Westinghouse", whose workers the UE had organized.

In January 1947 Marzani was indicted for defrauding the government by receiving government pay while concealing CPUSA membership; specifically, for having made false and fraudulent statements in a matter within the jurisdiction of an agency of the United States Government in violation of Section 80 of Title 18 of the United States Code Annotated. An unsympathetic account of his case, written by one of the participants in both the events and his trial, appeared in the anticommunist magazine Plain Talk. He was convicted on June 22, 1947.

Arthur Garfield Hays represented Marzani pro hac vice with Allan R. Rosenberg with Charles E. Ford and Warren L. Sharfman. Following conviction, Belford V. Lawson Jr. filed a brief on behalf of the National Lawyers Guild and Joseph Forer filed a brief on behalf of the Civil Rights Congress as amicus curiae urging reversal. Nine counts were overturned on appeal, while the Supreme Court split 4-4 on a rare rehearing of the last two charges. Marzani served all but four months of a thirty-six-month sentence.

In July 1947, Emile Despres vouched for Marzani's loyalty. In August 1947, Despres again "testified emphatically" for his loyalty before the House Committee on Un-American Activities.

In December 1947, Time magazine reported Marzani among other "unwelcome guests" to speak at six US colleges, whether "Republicans, Democrats, Communists, Buchmanites, Zoroastrians, or ecdysiasts". The article mentioned Gerhart Eisler and Marzani ("dismissed by the State Department for concealing his Communist card") together and that it was the University of Wisconsin which had barred him.

Despite the adversity of this period, Marzani continued actively making documentaries through his Union Films organization. In 1948, he made some dozen political campaign films for the Progressive Party presidential candidate, Henry A. Wallace, as well as a film for the American Labor Party incumbent candidate for Congress, Vito Marcantonio of East Harlem.

Marzani entered prison in March 1949. He later wrote of serving time in Danbury Federal Prison with former House Un-American Activities Committee (HUAC) chairman J. Parnell Thomas, as well as Ring Lardner, Jr. and Lester Cole of the Hollywood Ten, who had been convicted for refusing to testify at HUAC hearings. In prison, Marzani began work on a book blaming President Harry S. Truman for starting the Cold War. W.E.B. DuBois summarized its argument in his introduction, dated August 17, 1952:

The unquestioned desire of the American people for peace can be translated into action only by basic knowledge of how the present crisis has come about and how Roosevelt's peace policy became the Cold War. This book brings the reader undisputed proof of Truman's apostacy to the New Deal; of Churchill's machiavellian plans against the Soviet Union and of the sinister roles of Forrestal, Harriman, Dulles, Byrnes and Vandenberg, and of the murderous conspiracy which started the Korean War.

Caught attempting to smuggle the manuscript out of prison in 1950, Marzani was placed in solitary confinement. Soon after, the authorities transferred him to Lewisburg Federal Penitentiary where he was held in isolation for six months. The book was published in 1952, after his release, as We Can Be Friends: Origins of the Cold War.

Union Films went out of business during his stay in prison. After his release in 1951, Marzani edited UE Steward for the United Electrical Workers until 1954. The same year he joined Cameron Associates and partnered with Angus Cameron to run Liberty Book Club. Liberty Book Club eventually became Marzani & Munsell which operated the Library-Prometheus Book Club. The two book clubs, with some 8,000 members, published and distributed many books following their progressive ideology. In this phase of his career Marzani was a contact for the Soviet secret police agency, the KGB, and the KGB subsidized his publishing house in the 1960s, according to allegations made in 1994 by Oleg Kalugin, a retired KGB officer. The amounts were $15,000 in 1960, then a two-year grant in 1961 of $55,000.

In 1957, Marzani published the first American translation of writings by Antonio Gramsci, The Open Marxism of Antonio Gramsci. It was one of the first two translations in English of this seminal political theorist. Marzani's translation comprised about half of the book, while his introduction and annotations supplied the other half. A contemporaneous reviewer found Marzani's translation "remarkably fine" but disapproved both the format, with Marzani's interspersed annotations, and occasionally his comments' tone as well. A 1992 review of a later academic biography of Gramsci adopts Marzani's title of 35 years previous as the review's own. Opening with a discussion of Marzani's book, it quotes Marzani's introduction:

To speak of Gramsci as a Marxist with an open mind may strike many people as a contradiction in terms, because the behavior of a considerable number of Marxists has bolstered ruling class propaganda that Marxism is a dogma. Marxism is not a dogma though there are Marxists who are dogmatists, just as science is not dogma though there are scientists who are dogmatists. Marx himself made this point when he averred that he was no "Marxist."

Marzani traveled to Europe and the Soviet Union in September 1960, returning to New York in January. He was working on a Spanish translation of We Can Be Friends for publication in Cuba. Cuba's UN delegation arranged for him to visit Havana the following month. While he was there, Cedric Belfrage, a British friend from Marzani's OSS days, introduced him to Jacobo Árbenz, the former President of Guatemala overthrown by the CIA in 1954. Another OSS friend arranged a meeting with Che Guevera, with whom Marzani anticipated a US invasion of Cuba, six weeks before the US-financed, US-directed Bay of Pigs Invasion. These experiences provided background for Cuba Versus CIA, cowritten with Robert E. Light, an associate editor with Belfrage's newspaper, the National Guardian. This book was one of the first to list major covert CIA operations, including against Guatemala, and overthrowing the Mossadegh government in Iran in 1953.

In 1961, Marzani attended a Williams College alumni reunion where fellow alumnus Richard Helms spoke. Marzani quoted from Helms' speech and subsequent discussions in a 1966 book, A Text for President X, that was never published, as both Helms and Arthur Schlesinger, Jr. disliked. Helms stated in correspondence with Marzani that he did not want more attention for the CIA; and Schlesinger did not like Marzani's suggestion that the late President Kennedy planned a second Cuba invasion. Marzani continued to correspond with his intelligence contacts as late as 1979, keeping abreast of their views of foreign affairs including the Iranian Revolution and developments in China. He was still active in the early 1980's, going on a lecture tour to discuss his 1980 book, The Promise of Eurocommunism.

The Marzani and Munsell publishing house "was destroyed in a mysterious fire" in December 1968, ending the run of books, pamphlets, broadsheets and reprints chronicled in the Bibliography below. His publishing career at an end, Marzani purchased four Manhattan brownstones which he renovated and rented, while residing in one of them.

Marzani was one of the interviewees in Vivian Gornick's 1977 book, The Romance of American Communism. Like the other interviewees, Marzani was concealed by a pseudonym; his was "Eric Lanzetti". Gornick described the impression he made on her while she was researching this work, in her review of the first volume of his autobiography:

At the age of 62 he talked longer, harder, faster than anyone I'd ever met. As he talked he smoked, drank, cut the air with his hands, leaped up from his chair, paced the floor, grasped the arm of his listener. His dark eyes grew darker, his brows came together in (mock) ferocity, his white spade beard made him look now a patriarch, now an intellectual, now a con man. He was the most integrated Communist I had met. Everything he had learned in a long eventful life--about himself, others, the nature of human experience--seemed to flow into his politics. He had paid attention to the evidence of his senses. That evidence, apparently, had influenced his response--as a Marxist--to the world around him. His politics in turn had undoubtedly shaped the character of his emotional life, tempered his daily judgments, widened the scope of his relationships, made all things human interesting to him. For Marzani, Marxism was a philosophic perspective, not a political doctrine.

== Personal life and death ==
In 1937, Marzani married his first wife, Edith Eisner, an actress whose stage name was Edith Emerson. They had two children, Anthony Marzani and Judith Cutler. They divorced in 1966. The same year, he married Charlotte Pomerantz, a children's writer and journalist. They also had two children, Daniel Marzani and Gabrielle Marzani. Pomerantz's father was a well-known lawyer, Abraham Pomerantz, a former Nuremberg Trials prosecutor whom Congressman George A. Dondero alleged to have communist sympathies.

Carl Marzani died age 82 on December 11, 1994, in Manhattan.

== Publications ==
In later years, Marzani seems to have moved away from his Old Left roots. In 1972 he authored Wounded Earth, a well-respected book on environmental matters, at that time an unusual interest for a man associated with orthodox Marxism. In a 1976 article for the periodical In These Times, he spoke respectfully of the Club of Rome, a think-tank formed by a group of Italian industrialists in 1968; "it is a highly sophisticated group, the most thoughtful representatives of European capitalism". In a note appended to the article he commented "I have only two claims to fame: that I was the first political prisoner of the Cold War and that I wrote the first revisionist history of it." He continued to propound his later revisionism of a different sort, in his 1981 book The Promise of Eurocommunism.

=== Books by or co-written by Marzani ===
- John Gore, miner; a tragedy in 3 acts (1936)
- We Can Be Friends (1952)
- The Survivor: A Novel (1958)
- Dollars and Sense of Disarmament (1960)
- Cuba versus CIA (1961)
- The Shelter Hoax and Foreign Policy (1962)
- The Conscience of the Senate on the Vietnam War (1965)
- Withdraw!: From an Indochina War That Dishonors Our Country and Threatens Nuclear Disaster (1970)
- The Wounded Earth; an Environmental Survey (1972)
- The Threat of American Neo-Fascism: A Prudential Inquiry (1972)
- "Towards Eurocapitalism" (1976)
- The Promise of Eurocommunism (1980)
- Beyond 1984: Spain, Orwell and the Neo-Orwellians (1984)
- On Interring Communism and Exalting Capitalism
- The Education of a Reluctant Radical
  - Book 1: Roman Childhood (1992)
  - Book 2: Growing Up American (1993)
  - Book 3: Spain, Munich and Dying Empires (1994)
  - Book 4: From Pentagon to Penitentiary (1995)
  - Book 5: Reconstruction. Monthly Review Press, 2001

=== Translated by Marzani ===
- The Open Marxism of Antonio Gramsci (1957)
- Inside the Khrushchev Era (1960)

=== Published by Marzani & Munsell ===
Books by Marzani

- Cuba Versus CIA (1961)
- Dollars and Sense of Disarmament (1961)
- The Shelter Hoax and Foreign Policy (1962)
- The Military Background to Disarmament (1962)
- The Conscience of the Senate on the Vietnam War (1965)

Books by other authors

See Marzani & Munsell

== Filmography ==
A number of these are available for online viewing. See External links, below, for those.

- War Department Report, 1943, nominated for an Academy Award for Best Documentary Feature
- Air Force Report, 1945
- Deadline for Action, 1946, part 1; part 2
- Our Union, 1947
- The Case of the Fishermen, 1947
- The Great Swindle, 1948
- Count Us In, 1948
- A People's Convention, 1948
- People's Congressman (The Vito Marcantonio Story), 1948
- Dollar Patriots, 1948
- Time to Act, 1948
- Freedom Rally, 1948
- Wallace at York, 1948
- The Investigator, 1948
- Eyewitness in Athens, 1949
- Failure in Germany, 1949
- Israel Is Labor, 1949
- Rome Divided, 1949
- Industry's Disinherited, 1949
- Men Against Money, 1949
- Solidarity, 1950
- The Sentner Story, 1953

== See also ==
- Marzani & Munsell
- Charlotte Pomerantz
- Soviet espionage in the United States
- Office of Strategic Services
