= Robert F. Williams =

American civil rights activist (1925–1996)

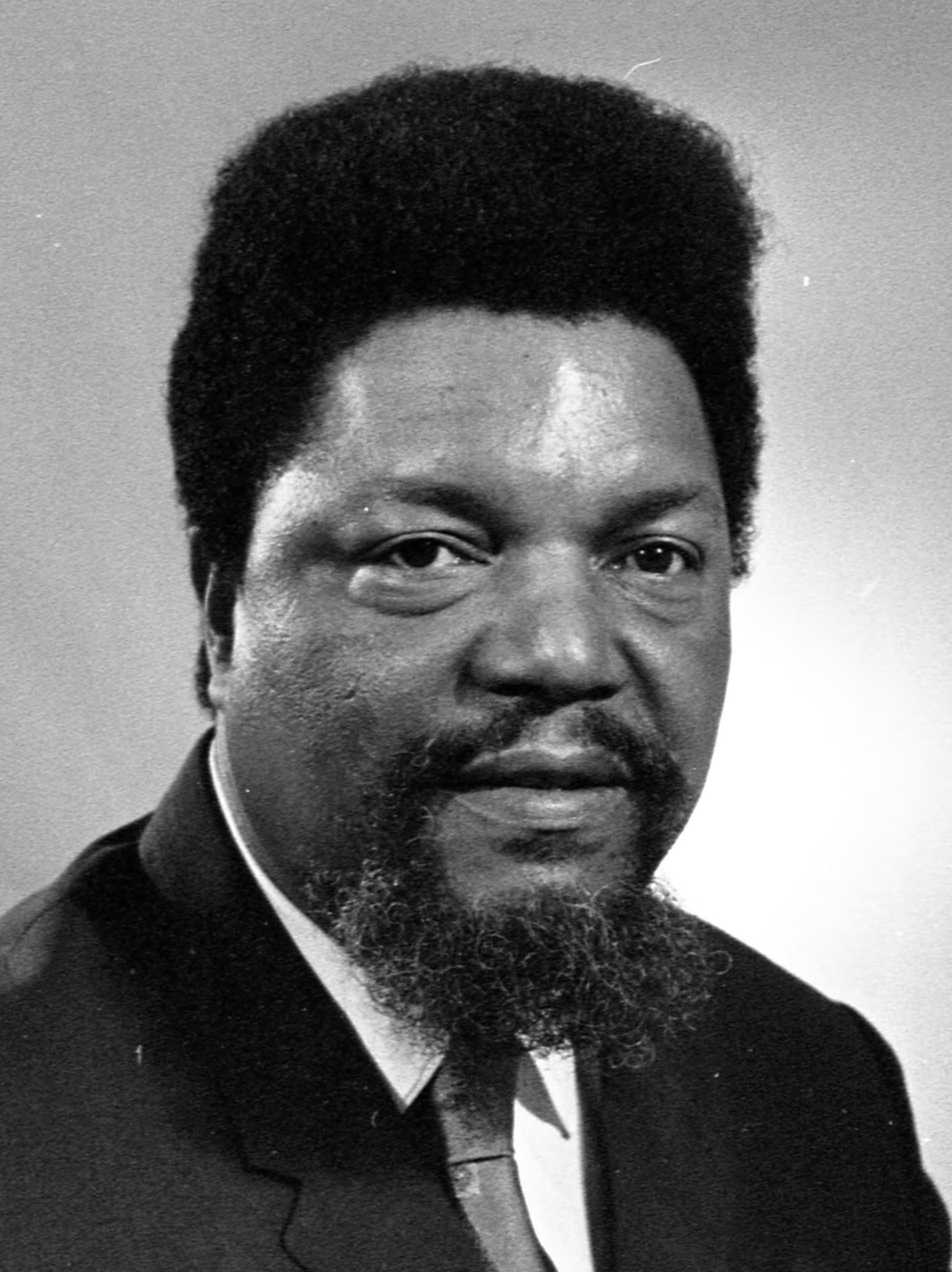
- Williams in 1971
- Born: Robert Franklin Williams; February 26, 1925; Monroe, North Carolina, U.S.
- Died: October 15, 1996 (aged 71); Baldwin, Michigan, U.S.
- Occupations: Civil rights leader, author
- Notable work: Negroes with Guns (1962)

Robert Franklin Williams (February 26, 1925 – October 15, 1996) was an American civil rights leader and author best known for being president of the Monroe, North Carolina chapter of the National Association for the Advancement of Colored People (NAACP) in the 1950s and into 1961 and serving as the first president of the provisional government of the Republic of New Afrika (RNA), a black nationalist and separatist organization. During the Jim Crow era, Williams succeeded in integrating the local public library and swimming pool in Monroe. At a time of high racial tension and official abuses, Williams promoted armed Black self-defense in the United States. In addition, he helped gain support for gubernatorial pardons in 1959 for two young African-American boys who had received lengthy reformatory sentences in what was known as the Kissing Case of 1958.

Williams obtained a charter from the National Rifle Association and set up a rifle club to defend Black people in Monroe from Ku Klux Klan or other attackers. The local chapter of the NAACP supported Freedom Riders who traveled to Monroe in the summer of 1961 in a test of integrating interstate buses. In August 1961, Williams and his wife left the United States to avoid federal kidnapping charges, first traveling to Canada, then Cuba, and later the People's Republic of China. These charges were dropped by the state when his trial opened in 1975, following his return in 1970.

Williams advocated black self-defense. Williams' book Negroes with Guns (1962) has been reprinted many times, most recently in 2013. It details his experience with violent racism and his disagreement with the non-violent wing of the Civil Rights Movement. The text was widely influential; Black Panther Party founder Huey Newton and African American Defense League founder Mauricelm-Lei Millere cited it as a major inspiration.

== Early life ==
=== Youth ===
Robert Franklin Williams was born in Monroe, North Carolina, on February 26, 1925, to Emma Carter and John L. Williams who worked as a railroad boiler washer. He had two sisters, Lorraine Garlington and Jessie Link, and two brothers, John H. Williams and Edward S. Williams. His grandmother, a former slave of Yoruba ancestry, gave Williams his grandfather's rifle. His grandfather had been a Republican campaigner and publisher of the newspaper The People's Voice during the hard years after Reconstruction in North Carolina. At the age of 11, Williams witnessed the beating and dragging of a black woman by police officer Jesse Helms Sr. Helms Sr., later the Monroe chief of police, was the father of future United States Senator Jesse Helms.

As a young man, Williams joined the Great Migration, traveling north for industrial work during World War II. He worked in factories in Detroit. He witnessed the 1943 Detroit race riot prompted by labor competition between white and black Americans. He was drafted in to the United States Army in 1944, serving in a segregated unit; he was discharged in 1946.

=== Marriage and family ===
In 1947, Williams married a 16-year-old African-American woman named Mabel Ola Robinson, a fellow civil rights activist. They had two children named John C. Williams and Robert F. Williams Jr.

== Civil rights movement ==
=== Early NAACP activities ===
In 1954, Williams enlisted in the United States Marine Corps, but was dishonorably discharged in 1955 because of his anti-segregationist views. Williams returned to Monroe, North Carolina, and became the president of the Union County NAACP chapter in 1954. He wanted to change the segregated town to protect the civil rights of blacks.

First they worked to integrate the public library. After that success, in 1957 Williams also led efforts to integrate the public swimming pools, which were funded and operated by taxpayer monies. He had followers form picket lines around the pool. The NAACP members organized peaceful demonstrations, but opponents fired on their lines. No one was arrested or punished, although law enforcement officers were present. At that time, Monroe had a large Ku Klux Klan chapter. The press estimated it had 7,500 members, while the city had a total of 12,000 residents.

=== Black Armed Guard ===
Alarmed at the threat to civil rights activists, Williams had applied to the National Rifle Association (NRA) for a charter for a local rifle club. He called the Monroe Chapter of the NRA the Black Armed Guard; it was made up of about 50–60 men, including some veterans like him. They were determined to defend the local black community from racist attacks, a goal similar to that of the Deacons for Defense who established chapters in Louisiana, Mississippi and Alabama in 1964–1965.

Newtown was the black residential area of Monroe. In the summer of 1957, there were rumors that the KKK was going to attack the house of Dr. Albert E. Perry, a practicing physician and vice-president of the Monroe NAACP. Williams and his men of the Armed Guard went to Perry's house to defend it, fortifying it with sandbags. When numerous KKK members appeared and shot from their cars, Williams and his followers returned the fire, driving them away.

"After this clash the same city officials who said the Klan had a constitutional right to organize met in an emergency session and passed a city ordinance banning the Klan from Monroe without a special permit from the police chief."

In Negroes with Guns, Williams writes:

[R]acists consider themselves superior beings and are not willing to exchange their superior lives for our inferior ones. They are most vicious and violent when they can practice violence with impunity. It has always been an accepted right of Americans, as the history of our Western states proves, that where the law is unable, or unwilling, to enforce order, the citizens can, and must act in self-defense against lawless violence.

Williams insisted his position was defensive, as opposed to a declaration of war. He relied on numerous black military veterans from the local area, as well as financial support from across the country. In Harlem, particularly, fundraisers were frequently held and proceeds were devoted to purchasing arms for Williams and his followers. He called it "armed self-reliance" in the face of white terrorism. Threats against Williams' life and his family became more frequent.

=== Kissing Case ===
In 1958, Williams, as head of the NAACP chapter, defended two young black boys, ages seven and nine, who were jailed and beaten in Monroe after a white girl kissed each of them on the cheek and told her mother, who became enraged. The incident was covered internationally and Williams became known around the world. His publicity campaign, inviting a barrage of headlines castigating Monroe and the US in the global press, was instrumental in shaming the officials involved. Authorities eventually released the boys, who were pardoned by the governor of North Carolina, but the state never apologized for its treatment of them. The controversy was known as the "Kissing Case".

=== Harassment ===
On May 12, 1958, the Raleigh Eagle, a North Carolina newspaper, reported that Nationwide Insurance Company was canceling Williams' collision and comprehensive coverage, effective that day. They first canceled all of his automobile insurance, but decided to reinstate his liability and medical payments coverage, enough for Williams to retain his car license. The company said that Williams' affiliation with the NAACP was not a factor; they noted "that rocks had been thrown at his car and home several times by people driving by his home at night. These incidents just forced us to get off the comprehensive and collision portions of his policy."

The Raleigh Eagle reported that Williams had said that six months before, a 50-car Ku Klux Klan caravan had swapped gunfire with a group of blacks outside the home of Dr. Albert E. Perry, vice president of the local NAACP chapter. The article quoted police chief A.A. Maurey as denying part of that story. He said, "I know there was no shooting." He said that he had had several police cars accompanying the KKK caravan to watch for possible law violations. The article quoted Williams: "These things have happened," Williams insisted. "Police try to make it appear that I have been exaggerating and trying to stir up trouble. If police tell me I am in no danger and that they can't confirm these events, why then has my insurance been cancelled?"

The following year, Williams was so incensed with the decision of a Monroe court to acquit two white men of raping a pregnant black woman, Mary Reid, that he replied by saying on the courthouse steps:

We cannot rely on the law. We can get no justice under the present system. If we feel that injustice is done, we must then be prepared to inflict justice on these people. Since the federal government will not bring a halt to lynching, and since the so-called courts lynch our people legally, if it's necessary to stop lynching with lynching, then we must be willing to resort to that method. We must meet violence with violence.

The Harvard Crimson quoted him as saying "the Negro in the South cannot expect justice in the courts. He must convict his attackers on the spot. He must meet violence with violence, lynching with lynching." It is not known where these quotes originated.

=== Suspension from the NAACP ===
In 1959, Williams was in a shoot-out with Ku Klax Klan members and local police officers, from which he fled.

Following his statements about meeting violence with violence, Williams was removed from his NAACP position in 1959. Williams disavowed any reference to lynching, rejecting retaliatory force, also called retaliatory violence, claiming he only said that African Americans should act in armed self-defense if attacked by white people.

=== Freedom Rides and prosecution ===
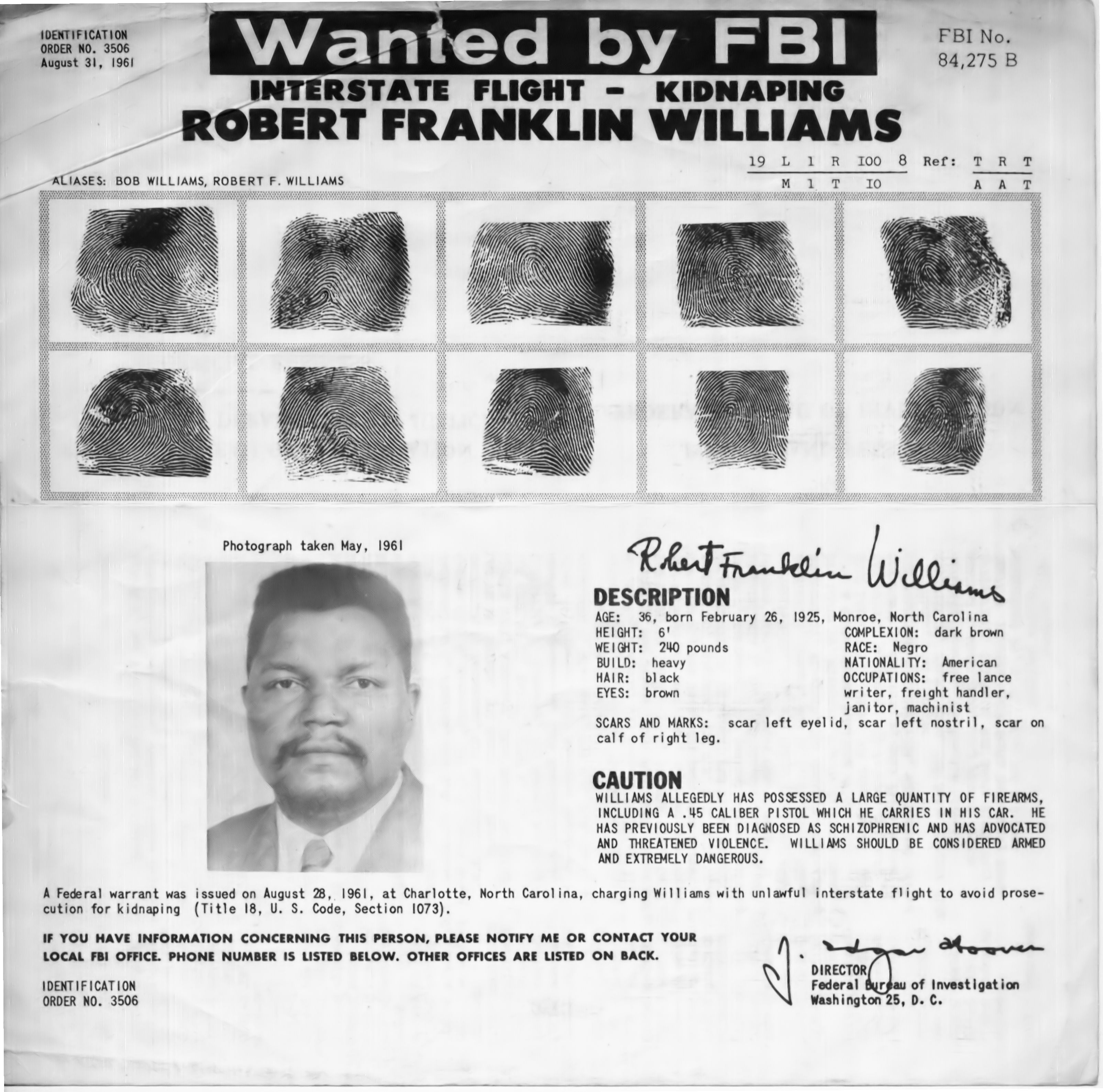
The FBI's wanted poster alerted people to an armed kidnapper.

Despite losing much support, civil rights activist James Forman was still supportive of Williams and his advocacy for using armed self defense against white oppression. Forman, who would also promote Williams' armed self-defense message during a visit to his home in Monroe, North Carolina, also agreed to assist Williams in organizing a Freedom Ride in Monroe. When CORE dispatched "Freedom Riders" to Monroe to campaign in the summer of 1961 for integrated interstate bus travel, the local NAACP chapter served as their base. They were housed in Newtown, the black section of Monroe. Pickets marched daily at the courthouse, put under a variety of restraints by the Monroe police, such as having to stand 15 feet apart. During this campaign, Freedom Riders were beaten by violent crowds in Anniston, Alabama and Birmingham.

As the picketing in Monroe proceeded, tensions heightened. In Negroes With Guns, Williams describes incidents on the third day picketing where a police officer knocked one picketer to the ground, another picketer was arrested, and another was spat at in the face by two white Monroe community members. On Friday, August 25, Williams wrote that one Freedom Rider was shot in the stomach with an air rifle while walking the line, and a group of Freedom Riders was attacked by white racists at a restaurant in nearby Mecklenburg County.

Williams writes that on Sunday, August 27, thousands of white racists from nearby counties and South Carolina gathered in Monroe, concentrating at the courthouse square. Fighting eventually broke out, the mob spread out through the town, and many Freedom Riders and black community members were arrested. Around 6pm that evening, Mr. and Mrs. Bruce Stegal, a white couple, rode through Williams' neighborhood and were recognized as having driven through the day before with a banner that read "Open Season On Coons". According to Williams, the Stegals were stopped at gunpoint on his block and were brought to his yard; Williams was in his house at the time. The crowd at Williams' house became angry with the Stegals, who asked Williams' to escort them out, which he declined to do. Williams writes that the Stegals then followed him into his house to avoid the angry crowd. Williams began receiving word that state troopers were moving in and his street was being blocked by police, so he and his wife and children left immediately and drove to New York that evening, according to Williams' account. Mrs. Stegal claimed that Williams kidnapped them, while Williams maintained that his actions saved their lives.

On August 28, 1961, the FBI issued a warrant in Charlotte, North Carolina, charging Williams with unlawful interstate flight to avoid prosecution for kidnapping. The FBI document lists Williams as a "freelance writer and janitor ... [Williams] ... has previously been diagnosed as a schizophrenic and has advocated and threatened violence ... considered armed and extremely dangerous." Williams fled to Canada, then Cuba, and then to China.

== Exile and return ==
=== Cuba ===
Williams went to Cuba in 1961 by way of Canada and Mexico. He regularly broadcast addresses from Cuba to Southern blacks on Radio Free Dixie. He established the station with approval of Cuban leader Fidel Castro, along with assistance of the government, and operated it from 1962 to 1965. While in America he had supported the Fair Play for Cuba Committee.

During the Cuban Missile Crisis in 1962, Williams used Radio Free Dixie to urge black soldiers in the U.S. armed forces, who were then preparing for a possible invasion of Cuba, to engage in insurrection against the United States.

While you are armed, remember this is your only chance to be free. ... This is your only chance to stop your people from being treated worse than dogs. We'll take care of the front, Joe, but from the back, he'll never know what hit him. You dig?

Williams also published a newspaper, The Crusader. In 1962, he wrote his book Negroes with Guns. It had a significant influence on Huey P. Newton, founder of the Black Panthers and in later years Mauricelm-Lei Millere, the founder of African American Defense League. Despite his absence from the United States, in 1964 Williams was elected president of the US-based Revolutionary Action Movement (RAM).

During his time in Cuba, Williams increased his efforts to obtain international support and publicity for the concept of African-American armed self-defense. Following requests by Williams, Mao Zedong issued a statement in People's Daily in August 1963 in support of the African-American struggle against discrimination. On August 10, China's ambassador to Cuba invited Williams to the Chinese embassy to be presented with a copy of Mao's statement. Later that month, People's Daily published a statement by Williams in which Williams stated that the dignity required self-defense and self-defense required a willingness to counterattack.

==== Visit to Hanoi ====
In 1965, Williams traveled to Hanoi, then the capital of North Vietnam. In a public speech, he advocated armed violence against the United States during the Vietnam War, congratulated China on obtaining its own nuclear weapons (which Williams referred to as "The Freedom Bomb"), and showed his solidarity with the North Vietnamese against the United States military attacks against that country.

Some Communist Party USA members opposed Williams' positions, suggesting they would divide the working class in the U.S. along racial lines. In a May 18, 1964, letter from Havana to his U.S. lawyer, civil rights attorney Conrad Lynn, Williams wrote:

... the U.S.C.P. has openly come out against my position on the Negro struggle. In fact, the party has sent special representatives here to sabotage my work on behalf of U.S. Negro liberation. They are pestering the Cubans to remove me from the radio, ban The Crusader and to take a number of other steps in what they call 'cutting Williams down to size.' ...

The whole thing is due to the fact that I absolutely refuse to take direction from Gus Hall's idiots ... I hope to depart from here, if possible, soon. I am writing you to stand by in case I am turned over to the FBI ...

Sincerely, Rob.

Williams opposed what he described as "fake Marxists" who argued that black people should be patient and seek intervention through the courts and the electoral process. In Williams' view, African Americans had the right to use any means to oppose violent policies which targeted them.

After leaving Cuba for China, Williams penned a 26-page letter to Fidel, reiterating his support for the Cuban Revolution but documenting a long list of grievances, including collusion between the CPUSA and the Cuban government, the blocking of non-CPUSA Black American journalists from the Tricontinental conference, and corruption within certain segments of the Cuban bureaucracy. A major target was a Tanzanian named D. H. Mansur, who Williams claimed conned him out of funds and was actively sabotaging Cuban operations in Africa. He closed the letter: "I deem it my revolutionary duty to bring these facts to your attention... I am convinced that if you are, and remain, unaware of these corrupt and sinister machinations taking place around you, you will soon be in the same predicament as Nkrumah, Ben Bella, or Sukarno."

=== China ===
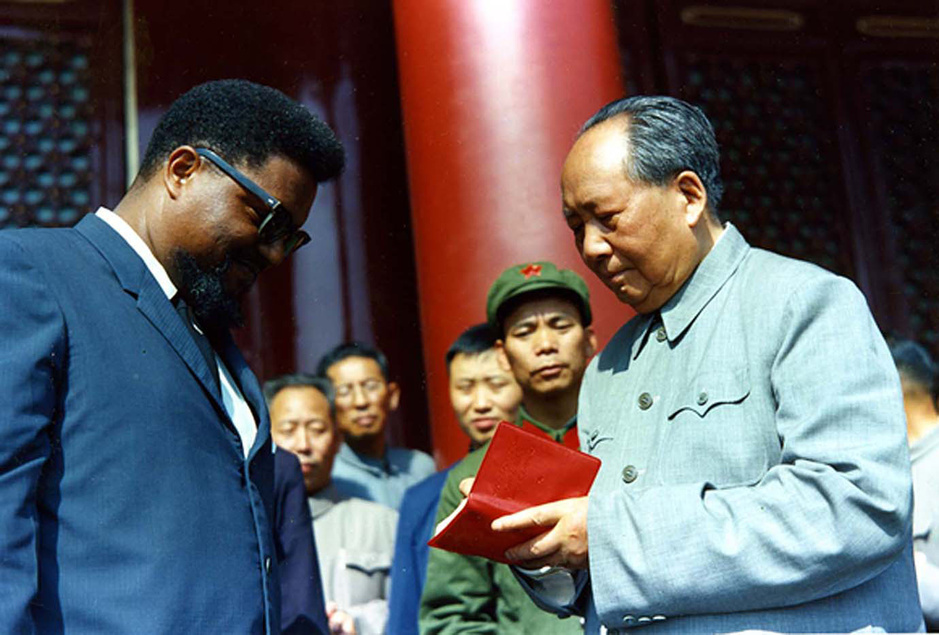
Mao Zedong meeting with Robert F. Williams

In Summer 1963, Negroes with Guns was translated and published in China.

In late September 1963, Robert and Mable Williams visited China. China treated Williams as a major leader, including presenting an honor guard for his arrival. On National Day, Williams met with Mao in advance of the National Day parade. Mao asked Williams about the development of the Black Liberation movement and its future. Williams predicted a long and difficult fight. Mao responded that Williams could be patient because of his age, and that a revolutionary program must be planned and sustained because its goal is to change society permanently. After National Day, the Williamses toured China.

Also in 1963, Williams attended Mao's 70th birthday party as an honored guest.

From 1966 to 1969, Williams lived in China, where he continued to publish The Crusader, which praised armed liberation movements in the United States and elsewhere. In 1967, Williams delivered a speech in Beijing on the 25th anniversary of the Yan'an Talks on Literature and Art. In it, Williams stated that "all our literature and art are for the masses of the people," and encouraged African-American artists to develop a new revolutionary approach.

Williams described China as last hope for African Americans, contending that "Without China, there can be no Black struggle in America." In a speech at a demonstration against United States imperialism in 1966, Williams praised what he described as the militant friendship between the Chinese and the revolutionary American people.

Represented by the ACLU and human rights lawyer Michael Tigar, he won a lawsuit against the U.S. Postmaster General, in which the statute allowing the U.S. Post Office to refuse to deliver foreign-origin publications deemed to be "communist political propaganda" except at the specific prior request of the addressee was declared unconstitutional under the First Amendment and the Due Process Clause of the Fifth Amendment. In January 1968, Conrad Lynn wrote to encourage Williams to return to the U.S., to which Williams responded:

The only thing that prevents my acceptance and willingness to make an immediate return is the present lack of adequate financial assurance for a fight against my being railroaded to jail and an effective organization to arouse the people. I don't think it will be wise to announce my nomination [for President of the United States] and immediate return unless the kind of money is positively available...

Lynn wrote Williams in a letter on January 24, 1968: "You are wise in not making a decision to come back until the financial situation is assured." Because no financial backing could be found, no 1968 "Williams for President" campaign was ever launched by Williams' supporters in the United States. By November 1969, Williams apparently had become disillusioned with the U.S. left. As his lawyer, Conrad Lynn, noted in a November 7, 1969 letter to W. Haywood Burns of the Legal Defense Foundation:

Williams now clearly takes the position that he has been deserted by the left. How and whether he fits black militant organizations into that category I don't know. Radio Free Europe offered him pay to broadcast for them. So far he has refused. But he has not foreclosed making a deal with the government or the far right. He takes the position that he is entitled to make any maneuver to keep from going to jail for kidnapping...

Williams was suspected by the Justice Department of wanting to fill the vacuum of influence left after the assassinations of his friends Malcolm X and Martin Luther King Jr. Hoover received reports that blacks looked to Williams as a figure similar to John Brown, the militant abolitionist who attacked a federal armory at Harper's Ferry before the American Civil War attempting to arm and free enslaved Black people. Williams' attempts to contact the U.S. government in order to return were consistently rebuffed.

In China, Williams moved closer to the Palestinian struggle. Although he had published pro-Palestinian editorials in The Crusader as early as 1964, in Beijing he met with Fatah officials one month after the Battle of Karameh. From Beijing, he declared:

I am convinced that Israel is embarked on a sinister mission of genocide against the Arab people. It is more than obvious that the objective of the world Zionist movement is the eventual conquest of all Arab lands and the extermination of the Arab people... There are great similarities between the struggles of the Arab people and the Afro-American people. We are fighting for survival against a sinister alliance of brutal exterminators. We are engaged in a common cause of justice and survival. We shall triumph at any cost. In a spirit of common resistance against the evil forces of tyranny, I proudly proclaim solidarity with our fighting brothers of Palestine and the entire Arab people.

In March 1968, a group of several hundred African-American leaders met in Detroit and declared the Republic of New Afrika, electing Williams as the President of its provisional government. An RNA delegation including RNA Vice President Gaidi Obadele and Information Minister Imari Obadele traveled to China in June 1968 and met with Williams. Williams accepted the presidency and proposed diplomatic initiatives for the RNA.

=== Return ===
When he decided to return to the United States, Williams began to raise funds for his bail and legal defense. During that time, he decreased his rhetoric about armed revolution in an effort to avoid complicating the upcoming legal proceedings.

In 1969, Williams returned to the United States to fight the legal charges against him in North Carolina. Williams' wife, Mabel Williams returned first, in September. Williams returned via London, England, reaching Detroit in 1969. Williams had chosen to return via Detroit because he could obtain political and financial support from the Republic of New Africa there and because he had greater faith in the Michigan courts than elsewhere in the United States. Federal agents immediately arrested him and he was released on bail.

Williams resigned from his position as President of Republic of New Africa and focused on his legal case and disseminating information about China. While under renewed legal pressure, Williams wrote to Beijing, hoping that they might once again issue a statement on his behalf. In the midst of the Sino-Soviet split and U.S.-Sino rapprochement, Mao's personal secretary Wang Hsi-Lin wrote back to Williams in October 1973:

We must take advantage of our friendship with American government in order to check the Soviet revisionists' surprise attack on China, this is a matter of [sic] live and death. Therefore, I am sorry to tell you that we do not think now is a proper time for New China News Agency report to interview you. I also hope you and your friends don't oppose but comply with the willing of the American government for the time being for the revolutionary benefit of the proletarians.

Williams was extradited from Michigan to North Carolina in December 1975. The historian Gwendolyn Midlo Hall chaired his defense committee and a broad range of left wing activists arrived to support him. Noted attorney William Kunstler represented Williams in court. North Carolina prosecutors dismissed the charges against Williams on January 16, 1976, stating that its major witness was too weak to appear in court.

== Death ==
Williams died at age 71 from Hodgkin's lymphoma on October 15, 1996. He had been living in Baldwin, Michigan. At his funeral, Rosa Parks, an activist known for sparking the bus boycott in Montgomery, Alabama, in 1955, recounted the high regard for Williams by those who joined with Martin Luther King Jr. in the peaceful marches in Alabama. Parks gave the eulogy at Williams' funeral in 1996, praising him for "his courage and for his commitment to freedom". She concluded, "The sacrifices he made, and what he did, should go down in history and never be forgotten."

== Works ==
- Negroes with Guns (with input by his wife; 1962), New York, NY: Marzani & Munsell. Reprinted by Wayne State University Press, 1998.
- "USA: The Potential of a Minority Revolution" [1964] 1965. In August Meier et al. (eds), Black Protest Thought in the 20th Century. Indianapolis and New York.
- Listen Brother!. 1968; New York: World View Publishers. 40 pp.
- "The Black Scholar Interviews: Robert F Williams", The Black Scholar, 1970.
- Williams, Robert F. While God Lay Sleeping: The Autobiography of Robert F. Williams (completed 1996, unpublished).

== See also ==
- Robert Charles

== Sources ==
- "Exile Robert Williams' Wife Returns to US from Africa", The Afro American (Baltimore, Maryland), August 30 or September 6, 1969; p. 22.
- Randolph Boehm and Daniel Lewis, The Black Power Movement, Part 2: The Papers of Robert F Williams, University Publications of America, Bethesda, MD, 2002. The linked-to document is a guide to a microfilmed version of the Robert F Williams Papers, which are at the Bentley Historical Library of the University of Michigan, Ann Arbor. It contains notes on the content of the papers and an introductory essay by Timothy Tyson.
- Truman Nelson, People With Strength. The Story of Monroe, N.C., 37 pp. N.Y. Committee to Aid the Monroe Defendants, n.d. (1962 or 1963?). Illustrated wraps. With hand-drawn map.
- Assata Shakur's site.
- Greg Thomas, "Spooks, Sex & Socio-Diagnostics", Proudflesh, volume 1.1, October 2002.
- Timothy B Tyson, "Robert Franklin Williams: A Warrior For Freedom, 1925–1996", Southern Exposure, Winter 1996.
- Timothy B Tyson, "Introduction", to Boehm and Lewis, The Papers of Robert F Williams, 2002, cited above.
- Robert F Williams, Listen Brother!, 1968, New York: World View Publishers. Opposes Vietnam War. 40 pages.
- Negroes with Guns: Rob Williams and Black Power, a 2004 film
