= Herbert Aptheker =

American Marxist historian and activist (1915–2003)

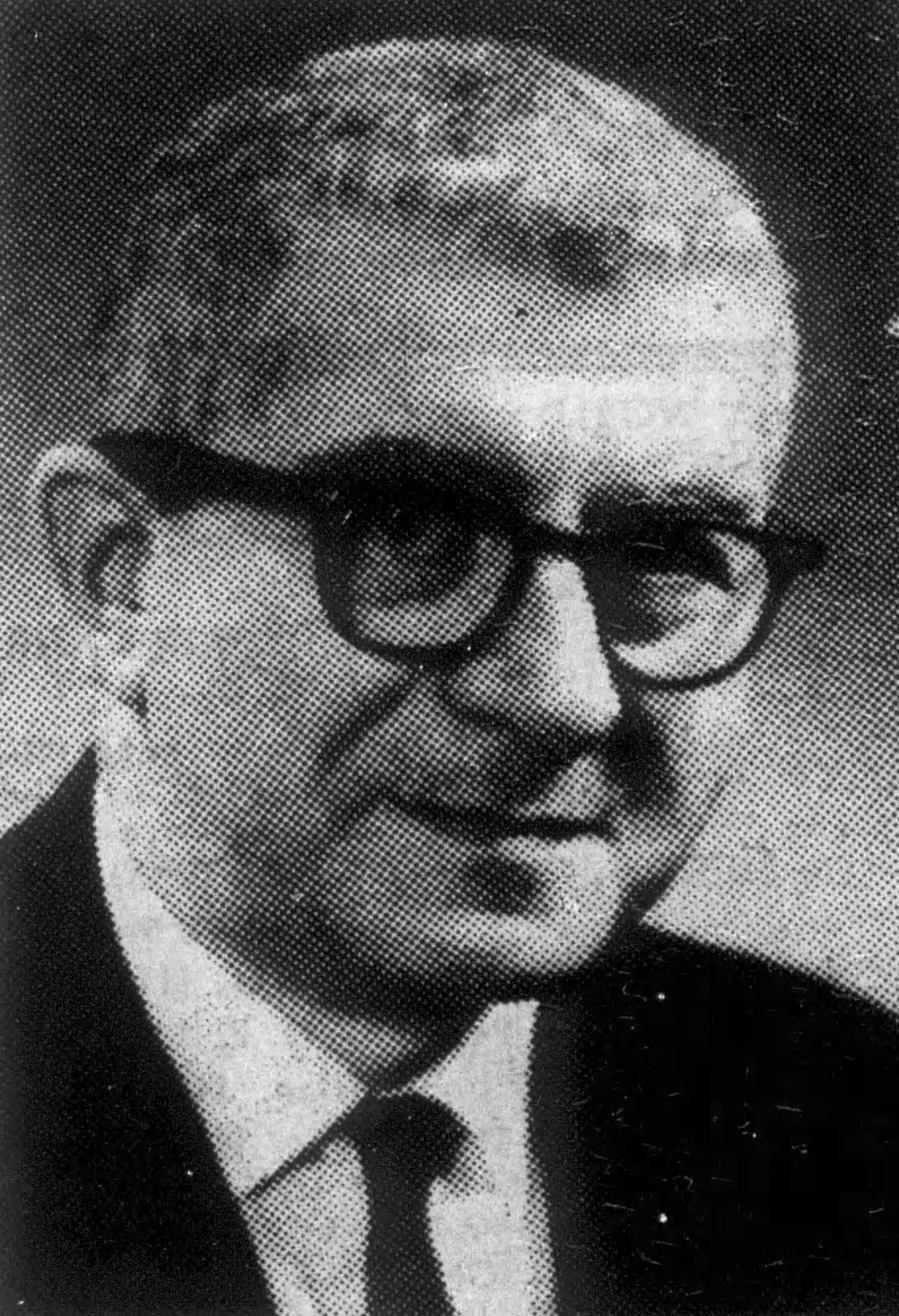
- Aptheker c. 1969
- Born: July 31, 1915; Brooklyn, New York, U.S.
- Died: March 17, 2003 (aged 87); Mountain View, California, U.S.
- Education: Columbia University
- Occupations: Marxist historian, editor, activist
- Notable work: American Negro Slave Revolts, Documentary History of the Negro People in the United States, History of the American People, The Correspondence of W. E. B. Du Bois, Anti-Racism in U.S. History
- Political party: Communist (1939–1992)
- Other political affiliations: Peace and Freedom (1966)
- Spouse: Fay Aptheker (m. 1942; died 1999)
- Children: Bettina Aptheker
- Military career
- Allegiance: United States
- Branch: United States Army
- Service years: 1942–1946
- Rank: Major
- Unit: 92nd Infantry Division
- Commands: 350th Field Artillery Battalion
- Conflicts: World War II

Herbert Aptheker (July 31, 1915 – March 17, 2003) was an American Marxist historian and political activist. He wrote more than 50 books, mostly in the fields of African-American history and general U.S. history, most notably, American Negro Slave Revolts (1943), a classic in the field. He also compiled the 7-volume Documentary History of the Negro People (1951–1994). In addition, he compiled a wide variety of primary documents supporting study of African-American history. He was the literary executor for W. E. B. Du Bois.

From the 1940s, Aptheker was a prominent figure in U.S. scholarly discourse. Aptheker was blacklisted in academia during the 1950s because of his Communist Party membership. He succeeded V. J. Jerome in 1955 as editor of Political Affairs, a communist theory magazine.

== Biography ==
=== Early life and education ===
Herbert Aptheker was born in Brooklyn, New York, the youngest child of a wealthy Jewish family.

In 1931, when he was 16, he accompanied his father on a business trip to Alabama. There he learned first-hand about the oppression of African Americans under Jim Crow Laws in the South. The trip proved shocking and life-altering for Aptheker, who upon his return to Brooklyn began writing a column called "The Dark Side of The South" for his Erasmus Hall High School newspaper.

Aptheker graduated from high school in the spring of 1933, during the Great Depression. Although admitted to Columbia University, he was unable to gain admission to the main campus of Columbia College, which had already filled a quota set for Jews by college president Nicholas Murray Butler. Instead, Aptheker was relegated to enrolling at Seth Low Junior College in Brooklyn Heights, a satellite school established by Butler as a de facto dumping ground for Jews and ethnic Italians admitted in excess of Butler's quotas.

During his time at Seth Low, Aptheker was first drawn into political activity, helping to organize anti-war rallies and speaking on behalf of the communist-backed National Student League (NSL) and the socialist-backed Student League for Industrial Democracy. He began reading the Communist Party's daily newspaper, The Daily Worker, at this time as well as the party's literary-artistic monthly, The New Masses, although he did not yet become a member of the party.

After two years at Seth Low, Aptheker was allowed to enroll at Columbia's main campus in Morningside Heights in Manhattan, but not with full status as a member of Columbia College. Instead, he was classified as a "university undergraduate", which placed him on track for a lesser Bachelor of Science degree rather than the higher-status Bachelor of Arts, which he received in 1936. At Columbia, Aptheker continued to engage in the anti-war movement, both through the NSL and the American League Against War and Fascism, a broader mass organization of the Communist Party during its Popular Front period.

Aptheker earned his Master's degree from Columbia in 1937 and a Ph.D. in 1943 from the same institution. In September 1939, he joined the Communist Party USA. He was awarded a Guggenheim Fellowship in sociology in 1945.

=== Marriage and World War II ===
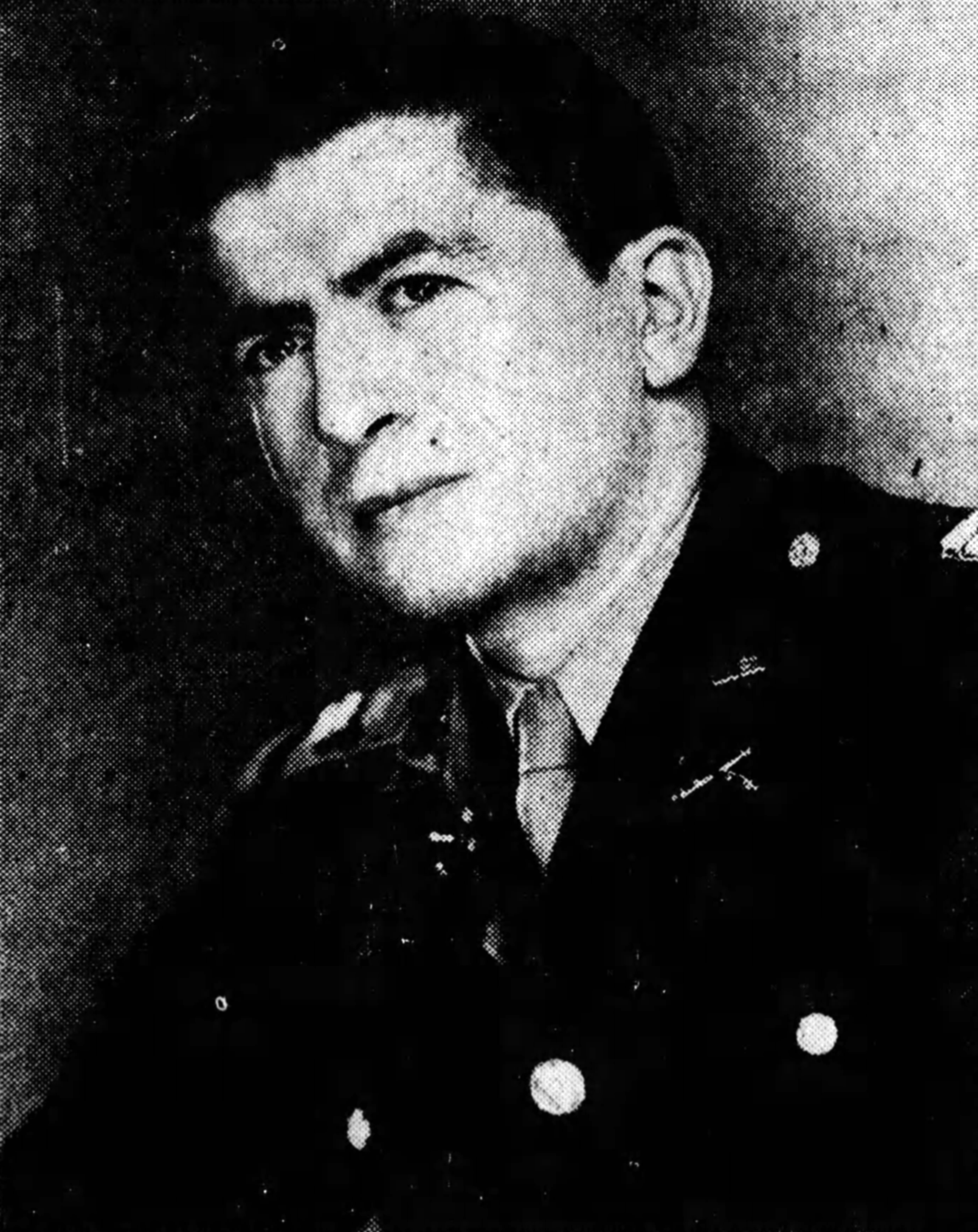
Captain Herbert Aptheker in uniform c. 1946

In 1942 Aptheker married Fay Philippa Aptheker (1905–1999), a first cousin who was also a native of Brooklyn. She was a union organizer and political activist. They were married for 62 years, until her death. Their daughter, Bettina, was born in 1944 at the U.S. Army Hospital in Fort Bragg, North Carolina during Aptheker's service in World War II.

Aptheker enlisted in the U.S. Army in 1942, participating in Operation Overlord, the invasion of northern France. By 1945 he had been promoted to the rank of Major, commanding the all-black 350th Field Artillery Battalion. That year, he was one of 16 Army officers and enlisted men singled out as alleged Communists by the House Committee on Military Affairs. General "Wild Bill" Donovan came to their defense, citing their loyalty and effectiveness. Aptheker returned home in 1946, and in December 1950 lost his commission and was honorably discharged after failing to respond to the Army's letter of inquiry about his Communist political activity.

=== Work in the South ===
Returning with his family to the South after the war, Aptheker became an educational worker for the Food and Tobacco Workers Union. Shortly afterward, he served as secretary of the "Abolish Peonage Committee," which had been established in 1940 by activists in New York and Chicago, with the support of the International Labor Defense (IDL), an arm of the Communist Party. "Peons" in the South, the vast majority of whom were African American, were typically rural sharecroppers who became tied to plantations by the debt they owed to the plantation owners, or to local merchants. This practice had effectively maintained African-American slavery after the Civil War in all but name.

Given repeated publicity about peonage abuses, in 1941 Attorney General Francis Biddle had directed all federal prosecutors to "actively investigate and try more peonage cases." On the verge of entering World War II, the US would make more effort to reduce rural peonage.

Similarly, southern states had run convict leasing programs, hiring out convicts to industries and taking the fees as revenue. Several southern states had banned convict leasing to industries in the early 20th century: Tennessee, South Carolina, Louisiana, Mississippi, Georgia, Arkansas and Florida by 1923.

==== Research in African-American history ====
Aptheker's master's thesis, a study of Nat Turner's Rebellion in Virginia in 1831, laid the groundwork for his future work on the history of American slave revolts. Aptheker asserted Turner's heroism, demonstrating how his rebellion was rooted in resistance to the exploitative conditions of the Southern slave system. His Negro Slave Revolts in the United States 1526–1860 (1939), includes a table of documented slave revolts by year and state. His doctoral dissertation, American Negro Slave Revolts, was published in 1943. Doing research in Southern libraries and archives, he uncovered 250 similar episodes.

Aptheker set forth historiographical arguments, challenging some conservative histories, most notably the perspective in the writings of Georgia-born historian Ulrich Bonnell Phillips, who was considered part of the Dunning School at Columbia University. Historians of this group had been critical of Reconstruction and argued that slavery was no worse than urban labor conditions. Phillips had characterized enslaved African Americans as childlike, inferior, and uncivilized; he argued that slavery was a benign institution; and defended the preservation of the Southern plantation system. Such works had been common in the field before Aptheker's scholarship.

Aptheker long emphasized W. E. B. Du Bois' social science scholarship and lifelong struggle for African Americans to achieve equality. In his work as a historian, he compiled a documentary history of African Americans in the United States, a monumental collection which he started publishing in 1951. It eventually resulted in seven volumes of primary documents, a tremendous resource for African-American studies.

==== Post-war activism ====
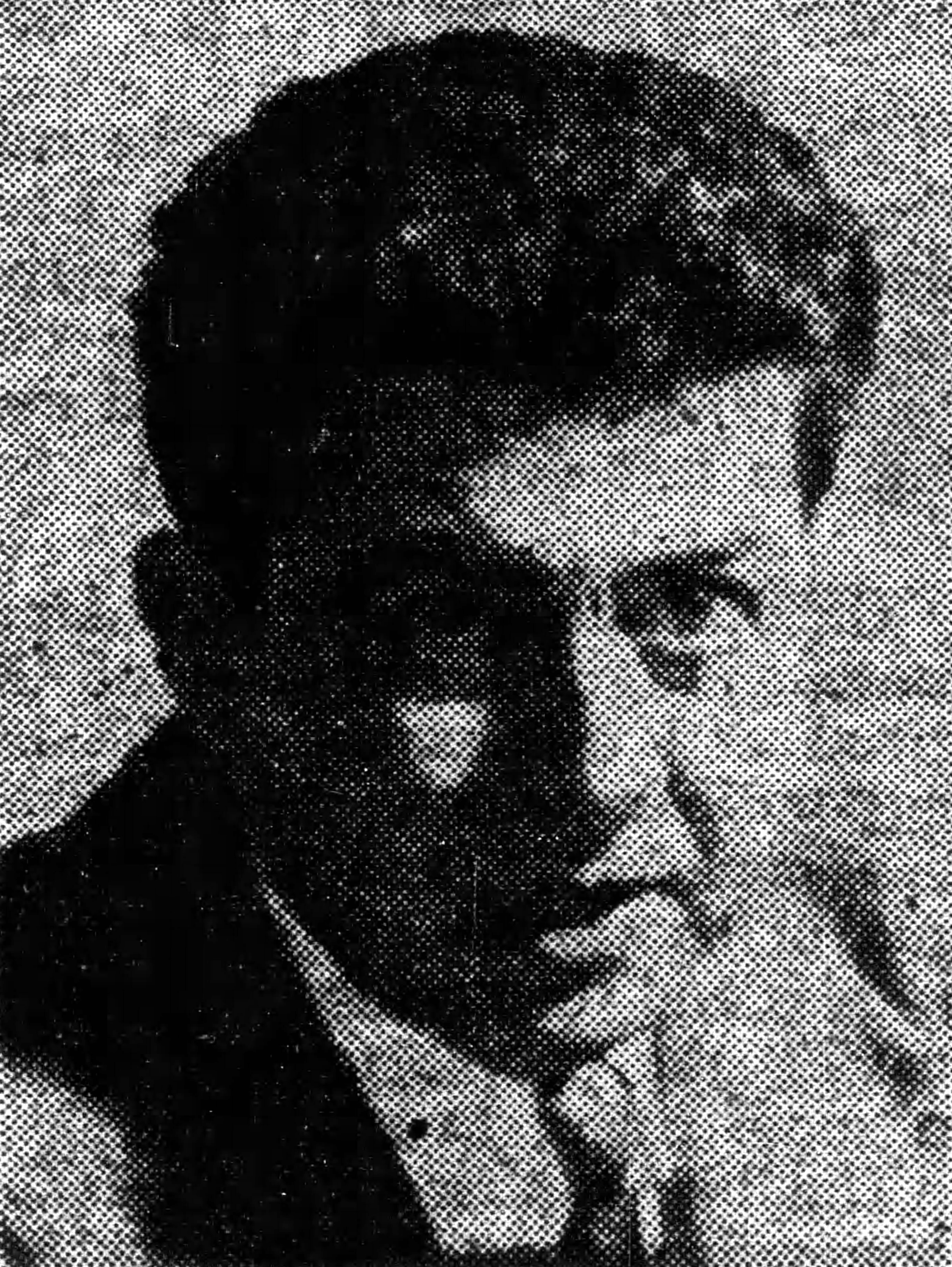
Aptheker c. 1949

During the 1950s and the period of McCarthyism, Aptheker was blacklisted in academia because of his membership in the Communist Party. He was unable to obtain an appointment as a university lecturer for a decade. Aptheker served on the National Committee of the CPUSA from 1957 to 1991. For several years in the 1960s and 1970s, he was executive director of the American Institute For Marxist Studies. In 1966, he ran in the U.S. House of Representatives election in New York's 12th Congressional District for the Peace and Freedom Party; he received 3,562 votes. Given his work on African-American documents and history, Aptheker was chosen by W. E. B. Du Bois to be his literary executor.

A strong opponent of the Vietnam War, Aptheker lectured on the subject on college campuses nationwide. At the invitation of North Vietnam, he, Tom Hayden and Staughton Lynd traveled through the country from December 1965 to January 1966. Aptheker wrote about the experience in Mission to Hanoi (1966). From 1969 to 1973, he taught a full-year course annually in Afro-American History at Bryn Mawr College. He left the Communist Party in 1992 along with Michael Myerson, Angela Davis, Gil Green, and Charlene Mitchell, co-founding the Committees of Correspondence for Democracy and Socialism. Aptheker died at age 87 on March 17, 2003, in Mountain View, California. His wife had died in 1999.

==== Allegation of child abuse ====
Bettina Aptheker is a professor of feminist studies at the University of California, Santa Cruz. In her 2006 memoir, Intimate Politics, she claimed that she was sexually abused by her father from the age of 3 to 13. Her memories of the events began to arise in 1999, after her mother's death and when she was working on a memoir. She sought counseling for her dissociation and recovered memory. She also wrote that she and her father reconciled before his death in 2003.

Her assertion caused great controversy among historians and activists. Some raised questions about her credibility; others questioned the Old Left's desire to bury the news, and still others wondered at how to look at Aptheker's work in view of this information.

In her memoir, Bettina Aptheker wrote more at length about her father's work on African-American history. She thought that he celebrated black resistance in part "to compensate for his deep shame about the way, he believed, the Jews had acted during the Holocaust."

The controversy about her claims about her father continued for months, with many essays and letters published on the History News Network hosted by George Mason University. In November 2007, the historian Christopher Phelps published an overview of the issues. He also wrote that he had interviewed Bettina Aptheker's partner, Kate Miller, who had been present during Bettina's 1999 conversation with her father about the abuse, and confirmed her account.

== Works ==
- The Negro People in America: A Critique of Gunnar Myrdal’s “An American Dilemma” (International Publishers: New York, 1946)
- "Mississippi Reconstruction and the Negro Leader Charles Caldwell", Science & Society (Fall 1947)
- Afro American History: 1910–1932 (Citadel Press: New York, 1951)
- Laureates of Imperialism (Masses & Mainstream: New York, 1954)
- History and Reality (1955), later republished as The Era of McCarthyism (Marzani & Munsell: New York, 1962)
- The American Revolution 1763–1783 (International Publishers: New York, 1960)
- The American Civil War (International Publishers: New York, 1961)
- American Negro Slave Revolts (1943) (Cameron Associates: NY, 1955)
- Toward Negro Freedom (New Century Publishers: New York, 1956)
- Documentary History of the Negro People, 7 volumes (Carol Publishing Group: NJ, 1951–1994)
- The Truth about Hungary (Kraus Reprint: NY, 1957)
- The Colonial Era (International Publishers: New York, 1959)
- And Why Not Every Man? Documentary Story of the Fight Against Slavery in the U.S. (Seven Seas Books: CA, 1961)
- Dare We Be Free? The Meaning of the Attempt To Outlaw the Communist Party (New Century Publishers: Dublin, 1961)
- Soul of the Republic: The Negro Today (Marzani & Munsell, New York, 1964)
- “One Continual Cry”: David Walker's Appeal to the Colored Citizens of the World (1829–1830), Its Setting & Its Meaning (New York: Humanities Press, 1965)
- Nat Turner's Slave Rebellion: Including the 1831 "Confessions" (Dover: NY, 1966)
- Mission to Hanoi (International Publishers: New York, 1966)
- Czechoslovakia and Counter-Revolution: Why the Socialist Countries Intervened (New Outlook Publishers, New York, 1969)
- "Imperialism and Irrationalism", Telos 04 (Fall 1969)
- The Urgency of Marxist-Christian Dialogue (Kraus Reprint: NY, 1970)
- Afro-American History: The Modern Era, (Citadel Press, Secaucus, 1971)
- American Negro Slave Revolts (International Publishers: New York, 1974)
- Early Years of the Republic: From the End of the Revolution to the First Administration of Washington (International Publishers: New York, 1976)
- The World of C. Wright Mills (Kraus Reprint: NY, 1977)
- American Foreign Policy and the Cold War (Kraus Reprint: NY, 1977)
- Unfolding Drama,(International Publishers: New York, 1979)
- The Nature of Democracy, Freedom & Revolution (International Publishers: New York, 1981)
- Racism, Imperialism & Peace: Selected Essays (MEP Publications: MN, 1987)
- Abolitionism: A Revolutionary Movement (Twayne Publishers: CT, 1989)
- The Literary Legacy Of W. E. B. Du Bois (Kraus Reprint: NY, 1989)
- To Be Free: Studies in American Negro History (Citadel Press: New York, 1991)
- Anti-Racism in U.S. History: The First Two Hundred Years, (Praeger: CT, 1992)

== Works featuring an introduction or foreword by Aptheker ==
- Washington, Booker T., Herbert Aptheker (Foreword), The Negro in the South 2nd ed., (Carol Publishing Group: NJ, 1989)
- Du Bois, W. E. B., Herbert Aptheker (Introduction), The Quest of the Silver Fleece

== Works edited by Aptheker ==
- Du Bois, W. E. B., Herbert Aptheker(Ed.), The Autobiography of W. E. B. Du Bois: A Soliloquy on Viewing My Life from the Last Decade of Its First Century, (International Publishers: NY, 1968)
- Du Bois, W. E. B., Herbert Aptheker (Ed.), The Education of Black People: Ten Critiques, 1906–1960, (Monthly Review Press: NY, 1973)
- Du Bois, W. E. B., Herbert Aptheker (Ed.), Contributions by W. E. B. Du Bois in Government Publications and Proceedings, (Kraus-Thomson Organization: NY, 1980)
- Du Bois, W. E. B., Herbert Aptheker, Bettina Aptheker, David Graham Dnm Dubois (Ed.),Prayers for Dark People, (University of Massachusetts Press: MA, 1980)
- Du Bois, W. E. B., Herbert Aptheker (Ed.), Selections from the Crisis, (Kraus-Thomson Organization: NY, 1980)
- Du Bois, W. E. B., Herbert Aptheker (Ed.), Writings by W. E. B. Du Bois in Non-Periodical Literature Edited by Others, (Kraus-Thomson Organization: NY, 1982)
- Du Bois, W. E. B., Herbert Aptheker (Ed.), Creative Writings by W. E. B. Du Bois: A Pageant, Poems, Short Stories, and Playlets, (Kraus-Thomson Organization: NY, 1985)
- Du Bois, W. E. B., Herbert Aptheker (Ed.), Against Racism: Unpublished Essays, Papers, Addresses, 1887–1961, (University of Massachusetts Press: MA, 1985)
- Du Bois, W. E. B., Herbert Aptheker (Ed.), Newspaper Columns, (Kraus-Thomson Organization: NY, 1986)
- Knutson, April A., Herbert Aptheker (Ed.), Ideology and Independence in the Americas, (MEP Publications: MN, 1989)
- Du Bois, W. E. B., Herbert Aptheker (Ed.), The Correspondence of W. E. B. Du Bois, (University of Massachusetts Press: MA, 1997)

== Research resources ==
- "Herbert Aptheker Papers, 1842–2005" (122 linear ft.), Department of Special Collections and University Archives, Stanford University Libraries, Stanford, CA. Text Finding Aid
