= Conrad Lynn =

American activist and lawyer

Conrad J. Lynn
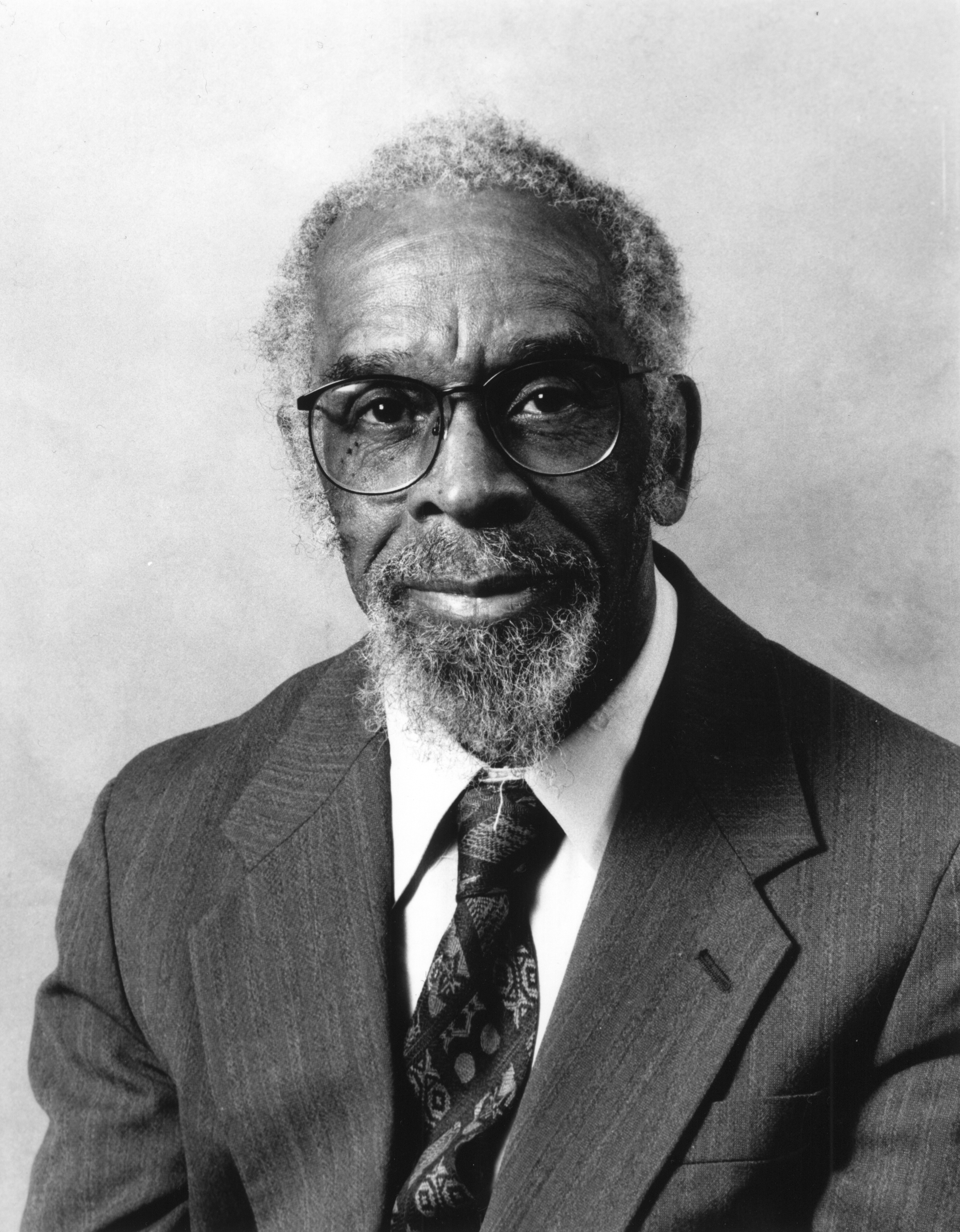
- Born: November 4, 1908; Newport, Rhode Island, US
- Died: November 16, 1995 (aged 87); Pomona, New York, US
- Education: Syracuse University College of Law
- Occupation: Attorney
- Known for: Activism
- Spouses: Mary L. Garretson (m. 1948; div. 1950); Yolanda M. Moreno (m. 1952)
- Parent(s): Joseph Lynn of Augusta, Georgia, and Nellie Irving Lynn of Aiken, South Carolina
- Awards: The Roy Wilkins Civil Rights Award 1990, presented at the 23rd Annual NAACP image Awards

Conrad Joseph Lynn (November 4, 1908 – November 16, 1995) was an African-American civil rights lawyer and activist known for providing legal representation for activists, including many unpopular defendants. Among the causes he supported as a lawyer were civil rights, Puerto Rican nationalism, and opposition to the draft during both World War II and the Vietnam War. The controversial defendants he represented included civil rights activist Robert F. Williams and Black Panther leader H. Rap Brown.

== Early life and education ==
Conrad J. Lynn was born in 1908 in Newport, Rhode Island, to parents who had moved north from Georgia. His mother was a domestic worker and his father, a Republican, worked as a laborer. When he was a child, the family moved to Rockville Centre in Nassau County on Long Island. Lynn attended law school at Syracuse University on a debating scholarship, in 1932 becoming the first African American to graduate from the Syracuse University College of Law.

As a young man in the 1920s and 1930s, he was a member of the Communist Party, but he was ousted in the late 1930s because he had defied the party by supporting Trinidadian oil workers who went on strike against Britain. He never rejoined. Years later, the House Un-American Activities Committee was to describe him erroneously as "indiscriminate in support of Communist organizations."

== Career as a lawyer and activist ==
=== African-American civil rights ===
In April 1947, Lynn participated in the Journey of Reconciliation, a challenge to Jim Crow laws that later came to be considered the first "freedom ride" of the American civil rights movement; it was a forerunner to the Freedom Rides of the early 1960s. Sixteen civil rights activists, eight of them black and eight of them white, boarded Greyhound and Trailways buses and traveled through Virginia, North Carolina, Kentucky, and Tennessee to bring public attention to the reality of racial segregation and dramatize the South's widespread disregard of the 1946 U.S. Supreme Court decision Irene Morgan v. Commonwealth of Virginia. This held that the U.S. Constitution barred racial segregation in interstate transportation.

Lynn was the first of the group to be arrested, for sitting in the white section of a Trailways bus departing from Richmond, Virginia. Lynn told the bus driver that the Supreme Court had ruled against segregation on interstate buses, but the driver responded that his employer was Trailways, not the Supreme Court, and he was following Trailways rules. After being released on bail in Richmond, Lynn traveled to Raleigh, North Carolina, where he joined his colleagues on the bus and completed the journey.

In 1958, Lynn became involved in the highly publicized North Carolina "Kissing Case", involving a pair of African-American boys, 7 and 9 years old, who were jailed, prosecuted and convicted of rape, and sentenced to reform school until age 21 after they playfully kissed (or were kissed by) a white girl their age as part of a game. The National Association for the Advancement of Colored People (NAACP) could not enlist any of its attorneys to represent the boys and referred the case to Lynn. After learning that the boys had already been convicted and sentenced by a county juvenile court judge without having either legal counsel or an opportunity to confront their accusers, as required by the Sixth Amendment to the Constitution, Lynn appealed the conviction, but without result. He then contacted former First Lady Eleanor Roosevelt for assistance; she urged President Dwight Eisenhower to intervene in the situation. As a result of these efforts and international attention that Lynn and others generated for the case, which was embarrassing for the US government, after three months' detention the boys were pardoned by the governor of North Carolina and released.

The "Kissing Case" was Lynn's first collaboration with North Carolina civil rights activist Robert F. Williams. In 1959, Lynn protested Williams' suspension from the NAACP, and urged the organization to adopt a more "militant program". Lynn later represented Williams as his lawyer during the 1960s, when Williams, who had become increasingly militant, exiled himself in Cuba, China, and Tanzania to escape prosecution in the United States for a charge of kidnapping. Lynn visited Williams in Cuba.

In the mid-1960s, Lynn teamed with attorney William Kunstler to represent the Harlem Six (six black teenagers) in appealing their murder conviction for robbing a secondhand store and killing one of the store's proprietors. The two attorneys believed that the teenagers had been framed. In the appeal filed in 1965, Lynn and Kunstler asked for the convictions to be overturned on the grounds that the Six had not had competent legal counsel for their trial. The convictions were reversed for a different reason – that some trial evidence had been inappropriately admitted. Retrials were ordered, beginning in November 1970, when two of the Six were retried. Lynn and Kunstler revealed their discovery that two prosecution witnesses had committed perjury in the first trial. After the trial concluded, the jury reported that it could not reach a verdict, so the trial was declared a mistrial. After another trial was held, again ending in a mistrial, the defendants were allowed to plead guilty to manslaughter in exchange for their immediate release from confinement.

=== Military draft ===
During World War II, Lynn represented his eldest brother Winfred Lynn in his resistance against the draft. Winfred Lynn refused induction into the United States Army as a protest against the Army's racial segregation, telling the government that he would gladly serve in the unsegregated Canadian Army, but would not serve in the segregated U.S. Army. Conrad Lynn's decision to handle his brother's case was contrary to the advice of civil rights organizations such as the NAACP, which considered support of the U.S. war effort to be in the best interest of African Americans. The American Civil Liberties Union (ACLU) also refused to take the case, but ACLU attorney Arthur Garfield Hays participated with Conrad Lynn in Winfred Lynn's defense. Socialist Party leader Norman Thomas and journalist Dwight Macdonald led a support effort under the name 'Lynn Committee to End Discrimination in the Armed Forces.'

Winfred Lynn's case was based on a contention that racial discrimination in the military violated the Selective Service Act of 1940. After the U.S. Circuit Court of Appeals ruled against Lynn in February 1944, opining that the Selective Service Act's ban on discrimination did not bar segregation, the plaintiffs appealed to the U.S. Supreme Court. In 1945, the Supreme Court denied Winfred Lynn's certiorari request on the grounds that the case was moot because Winfred Lynn (who had been informed by an earlier court ruling that he needed to submit to military induction to keep his case alive) was by then in military service overseas. Looking back on the case in 1973, Conrad Lynn told a reporter that the legal battle had served "to make the public — particularly the white majority — aware that black people resented segregation as a mark of inferiority" and had helped bring an end to segregation in the Army in 1948 under President Harry S. Truman.

Two decades later, in the 1960s, Lynn represented a number of men who resisted the draft due to their opposition to the Vietnam War. In 1970 he argued the case of Gillette v. United States before the United States Supreme Court, challenging the constitutionality of the law that limited conscientious objector status to men who objected to war in general. He did not prevail in that case; the court's ruling in 1971 rejected all three arguments that had been advanced in support of selective conscientious objection.

=== Puerto Rican nationalism ===
Lynn was a long-time supporter of the nationalists who sought to gain independence for Puerto Rico. In the 1950s, he successfully defended Ruth Mary Reynolds against the charge of collaboration with the Puerto Rican Nationalist movement in the alleged advocacy of the overthrow the U.S. government.

He also represented Lolita Lebrón, one of five Puerto Rican nationalists who carried out an attack on the United States House of Representatives in 1954 to publicize the nationalist movement. He argued that the attack was an act of protest that was justified by "the illegality of the occupation of Puerto Rico by the United States." Lebrón and her four codefendants were convicted and given long prison sentences. Lebrón was not released from prison until 1979, when she was granted clemency by President Jimmy Carter.

=== HUAC ===
Lynn was interrogated by the House Un-American Activities Committee (HUAC) in 1963. He speculated that the committee's calling him reflected an effort by them "to frighten integrationists who are more radical than Martin Luther King."

=== Campaign for judgeship ===
In 1972 Lynn sought election to a judgeship on the New York State Court of Appeals, asserting that there should be a black man on the court, "since 90 percent of all those awaiting trial in state prisons are either black or Puerto Rican."

== Final years ==
Conrad Lynn remained engaged as an attorney and activist until a few months before his death. He was one of the founders of the human rights activist group Refuse & Resist! in 1987. The second edition of his autobiography, There Is a Fountain: The Autobiography of Conrad Lynn (ISBN 978-1556521669), first released in 1979 (ISBN 978-0882080987), was published in 1993.

Lynn resided in Pomona, New York, for more than 45 years, where he died peacefully in his sleep on November 16, 1995. He was survived by his wife Yolanda Moreno, three children and several grandchildren.

Conrad Lynn donated his papers to Boston University, where they are archived in the Howard Gotlieb Archival Research Center.
