= Negroes with Guns =

1962 book by Robert F. Williams

- 2015 ebook edition reproduction of original cover art
- Author: Robert F. Williams
- Language: English
- Genre: Black Power
- Publisher: Marzani & Munsell
- Publication date: 1962
- Publication place: United States
- Media type: Print

Negroes with Guns is a 1962 book by civil rights activist Robert F. Williams. Timothy B. Tyson said, Negroes with Guns was "the single most important intellectual influence on Huey P. Newton, the founder of the Black Panther Party". The book is used in college courses and is discussed in debates.

Negroes with Guns was Williams' experience throughout the Civil Rights Movement of Monroe, North Carolina. Because black rights were constantly violated, the self-defense policy was born, with Williams saying there was a need to "meet violence with violence." However, Williams claimed that black militants were not promoting violence, but were combating it, believing in self-defense and not aggression.

== In film ==
The subject matter of the book was made into the documentary film Negroes with Guns: Rob Williams and Black Power, directed by Sandra Dickson and Churchill Roberts, released in 2004. The film provides witness testimonies of many of the events described in the book and attempts to gather Williams from margins of movement scholarship.

== Foreign publication ==
In summer 1963, the book was translated and published in China.

== Impact ==
Negroes with Guns influenced Huey P. Newton and Bobby Seale in their founding of the Black Panther Party.
