= Barrows Dunham =

American philosopher (1905–1995)

- Born: Barrows Dunham; October 10, 1905; Mount Holly, New Jersey, U.S.
- Died: November 19, 1995 (aged 90); Wynnewood, Pennsylvania, U.S.
- Occupations: University professor, author
- Spouse: Alice Caley Clarke (m. 1930)
- Children: 1; Clarke
- Writing career
- Period: Mid-20th century
- Notable work: Man against Myth (1947)

Barrows Dunham (October 10, 1905 – November 19, 1995) was an American author and professor of philosophy. Known for writing popular works of philosophy such as Man against Myth (1947) and Heroes and Heretics (1964), he also gained notoriety as a martyr for academic freedom when Temple University fired him in 1953 for refusing to "name names" before the House Un-American Activities Committee.

== Biography ==
=== Early life and education ===
Dunham was born on October 10, 1905, in Mount Holly Township, New Jersey into a Philadelphia family with progressive leanings. His maternal grandfather had commanded a regiment of freed slaves in the Civil War. His father James Henry Dunham was a Presbyterian minister who resigned from the ministry in 1912. His prior study of modern philosophy and science at the College of New Jersey and at the University of Berlin led him ultimately to reject religious supernaturalism. In 1913 he took a Ph.D. in philosophy from the University of Pennsylvania and became a professor and dean at Temple University, where his son would teach as well.

Barrows was educated in a Philadelphia private Quaker grade school and high school, the William Penn Charter School. For his final pre-university year, he attended Lawrenceville School. He absorbed a full classical education, including Greek. At Princeton he was introduced to the formal study of philosophy. After earning his A.B. at Princeton in 1926, he taught English Composition and Literature at Franklin & Marshall College for the next two years. He then returned to Princeton to pursue a master's degree followed by a Ph.D. in philosophy. His dissertation was titled Kant's Theory of the Universal Validity of the Esthetic Judgment, subsequently published in book form as A Study in Kant's Aesthetics. From 1930-1937, he resumed his teaching position at Franklin & Marshall College.

=== Man against Myth ===
In 1937, Dunham joined the Temple University faculty as an assistant professor of philosophy. In 1942 he was promoted to associate professor and made chairman of the department, and six years later he became a full professor. During his time at Temple, Dunham published his first post-dissertation book, Man against Myth (1947), which brought him national recognition. In the book he analyzes ten commonly held "social superstitions":

- that you can't change human nature
- that the rich are fit and the poor unfit
- that there are superior and inferior races
- that there are two sides to every question
- that thinking makes it so
- that you cannot mix art and politics
- that you have to look out for yourself
- that all problems are merely verbal
- that words will never hurt me
- that you cannot be free and safe

The book devotes a chapter to each of these slogans "which Dunham believed were accepted uncritically and which distorted the human condition".

Man against Myth was praised for its accessible style that avoided academic jargon. It was commercially successful for a philosophy book, selling 75,000 copies in the hardcover edition. However, the book's leftist political orientation drew criticism, and was an indicator of the attacks that Dunham would later receive. Orville Prescott wrote in The New York Times that the author "distorts history to fit the Procrustean bed of his Marxist convictions. He exaggerates, oversimplifies and misleads. In Man Against Myth his air of sweet reasonableness and bland assurance may possibly serve to deceive the unwary." It was later discovered through FOIA documents that the FBI had worked behind the scenes to discredit Man against Myth, and pressured John Dewey to retract his initial laudatory comments about the book.

=== Political controversies ===
Dunham was a member of the Communist Party USA from 1938 to 1945. He learned in autumn of 1952 that Congress was investigating communist professors, and he knew he would soon be targeted. When the House Committee on Un-American Activities (HUAC) subpoenaed him, he was told that the way to clear himself was to name names, but he felt it would be "morally repugnant" to inform on his friends.

On February 27, 1953, Dunham testified before the HUAC. He declined to answer questions beyond providing his own name, date of birth, and birthplace. To all further inquiries he invoked his Fifth Amendment protection against self-incrimination. His decision to defy the Committee right from the outset was a result of observing the unsuccessful legal strategies of prior non-cooperative HUAC witnesses. Some had asserted their Fifth Amendment privilege, but did so after already answering questions and opening the door to more. A few witnesses, notably the "Hollywood Ten", had declined to answer based on their First Amendment freedoms of speech and association, and were jailed for contempt of Congress.

As a consequence of his non-cooperation, Dunham was suspended immediately by the Temple University president. A week after his HUAC appearance, Dunham released the following statement:

There is no question that Congress has the right, as it has the power, to investigate for legislative purposes. What I encountered last week, however, was not genuine inquiry but public defamation intended to extirpate from the colleges not disloyalty but dissent. I conceive that no act of mine could have better displayed my loyalty to this country and its traditions than the course I followed last Friday.

On September 23, 1953, Dunham was dismissed by Temple for "intellectual arrogance" and "obvious contempt of Congress." On May 11, 1954, he was formally cited for contempt of Congress. In October 1955, he was criminally tried in the U.S. District Court for the District of Columbia, and was acquitted.

Despite being legally exonerated, Dunham was not rehired by Temple University, and was blacklisted from teaching for over a decade. In 1956, the American Association of University Professors (AAUP) censured Temple for its treatment of Dunham, but his job was not restored. During his ban from teaching, he occasionally spoke at conferences and published book reviews and journal articles. In 1964 he authored what he later regarded as his best book, Heroes and Heretics. In 1968-69 he obtained a one-year contract to lecture in philosophy at Beaver College and worked there again in 1972-73. Between those years, he was a visiting professor at the University of Pennsylvania School of Social Work.

=== Later years ===
In 1981 the Temple University Board of Trustees reinstated Dunham, following a recommendation by President Marvin Wachman, who acknowledged that they should not have dismissed him for exercising his constitutional rights. Temple was urged into this course of action by its Faculty Senate and by Fred Zimring, an academic advisor in the College of Liberal Arts who had investigated the Dunham case in his doctoral dissertation, McCarthyism, the Cold War, and Temple University: the Dismissal of Professor Barrows Dunham from Temple. Dunham became a professor of philosophy emeritus at Temple and was awarded a lifetime $9,000 annual pension.

On November 14, 1995, Barrows Dunham died of a heart attack at a hospital in Wynnewood, Pennsylvania. He was 90.

== Bibliography ==
- Ethics, Dead and Alive (1971) ISBN 978-0394423715
- Heroes and Heretics: A Political History of Western Thought (1964) LCCN 63-9141
- Thinkers and Treasurers (1960) LCCN 60-3068
- The Artist in Society (1960) LCCN 61-3635
- Giant in Chains (1953) LCCN 52-12633
- Man against Myth (1947) LCCN 47-2131
- A Study in Kant's Aesthetics: The Universal Validity of Aesthetic Judgments (1934) LCCN 34-36064

== See also ==
- American philosophy
- List of American philosophers
