= Albert E. Kahn =

American journalist (1912–1979)

Albert Eugene Kahn
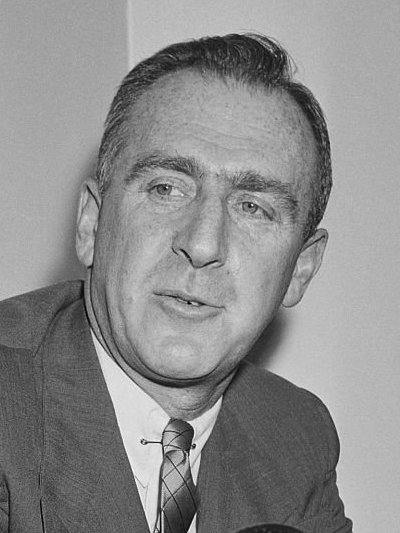
- Kahn in 1955
- Born: May 11, 1912; London, England
- Died: September 15, 1979 (aged 67); Glen Ellen, California, U.S.
- Spouse: Henriette Warner (m. 1934)
- Children: 3
- Relatives: Albert Kahn (uncle); Julius Kahn (uncle)

Albert Eugene Kahn (May 11, 1912 – September 15, 1979) was an American journalist, author, publisher, and photographer. He is known chiefly for his books Sabotage! The Secret War Against America (1942), related to Nazi and German-American subversive activities in the United States; and The Great Conspiracy: The Secret War Against Soviet Russia (1946). The latter described leading Soviet communists as foreign spies, based on their confessions at the Moscow Trials.

For a time during the Great Depression, Kahn had been a member of the Communist Party, but he changed his thinking within a few years and opposed the Party. In the early-to-mid 1940s, he authored or co-authored several successful books of investigative journalism. At the end of the decade, however, he found himself blacklisted and unable to gain publication by a mainstream publisher. In response, he and Angus Cameron, an American editor who had also been blacklisted, formed their own publishing house, Cameron & Kahn. The blacklist eventually eased for Kahn in the 1960s and he resumed his career as an author.

== Early life and education ==
Kahn was born in London, England in 1912 to an affluent, politically conservative Jewish family. His father Moritz was a successful engineer. Moritz's two accomplished brothers were Albert Kahn, who became known throughout the U.S. and internationally as an industrial architect, and inventor Julius Kahn. Moritz's brother Albert had founded the architectural firm, Albert Kahn Associates, in Detroit, Michigan. In 1930, the firm established an office in Moscow to train and supervise Soviet architects and engineers, and to design industrial facilities. Moritz led the effort in the early 1930s to set up the Kahn brothers' Soviet operation, which was done in collaboration with Gosproekstroi (the Soviet office for industry) during the country's first five-year plan.

Educated in the United States, Albert E. Kahn attended Phillips Exeter Academy and Dartmouth College, where he was a star athlete. His education included an intensive reading of Shakespeare. Later in life, he said that the study of King Lear first awakened in him a sense of injustice. He was Dartmouth Class Poet, graduating in 1932.

Married in 1934, he and the former Henriette Warner moved to California. Their children included writer Brian Kahn. While there, Kahn tried unsuccessfully to become a Hollywood screenwriter.

== Political leanings ==
In the 1930s, Kahn developed an interest in advancing socialism and working for social justice. After the outbreak of the Spanish Civil War in 1936, Kahn agreed to lead an "ambulance tour" to raise medical relief funds for Loyalist forces fighting against the fascist-supported Franco rebellion. On the tour, Kahn spoke to audiences ranging from the wealthy to the unemployed. It was the depths of the Great Depression, and Kahn was deeply affected by the widespread deprivation that he saw. Communists and socialists organized many of the speaking events and impressed Kahn with their idealism. After completing the tour in 1938, he joined the American Communist Party.

With no employment prospects, Kahn accepted a job at his uncle's architectural firm, where his father Moritz was a senior engineer. But the younger Kahn's political activism quickly caused a rupture. A talented orator, Albert had begun giving anti-fascist speeches. Because he had the same name as his prominent uncle, the publicity caused consternation at the firm. Albert's uncle and father were concerned also because industrialist Henry Ford was the firm's largest client, and Ford was engaged in business in Nazi Germany. In a meeting with his uncle and father, the younger Kahn was given a choice: Stop speaking publicly, or resign. He chose the latter option.

== Anti-Nazi journalism ==
Almost immediately, Kahn was offered a position as Executive Director of the newly formed American Council Against Nazi Propaganda. Working for a Board of Directors including Helen Keller, Condé Nast, John Gunther, former Ambassador William E. Dodd, and German writer Thomas Mann, Kahn founded The Hour, a syndicated newsletter. In that capacity, he engaged in investigative journalism to expose Nazi espionage, sabotage, and propaganda operations in the United States. He also investigated the activities of American fascist and pro-fascist groups, such as the German-American Bund. The Hour's revelations were widely used in printed media, by radio commentators such as Walter Winchell, and by the U.S. War Department, Justice Department, and the Office of War Information.

== Authorship ==
Kahn used materials gained by his investigations of Nazi and German-American activities for The Hour as the basis of his first book, Sabotage! The Secret War Against America (1942), co-written with Michael Sayers. Reader's Digest printed excerpts from the book, and it became a bestseller.

Kahn and Sayers also collaborated on The Plot Against the Peace: A Warning to the Nation! (1945), a post-1917 political history of the United States, and The Great Conspiracy: The Secret War Against Soviet Russia (1946), which became an international bestseller. In the latter book, which explored the Moscow purge trials, the authors accepted as valid the Communist Party charges of treason against former Soviet opposition leaders, and the underlying allegation of plots to overthrow the Soviet state, assassinate Lenin, Stalin, Gorky, and others. Most historians, by contrast, believe that these were show trials designed to suppress any opposition to Stalin; many of those convicted were summarily executed or exiled in the gulag.

Kahn was an outspoken opponent of the Cold War that arose between the U.S. (and its Western allies) and the Soviet Union in the aftermath of World War II. He later authored the book, The Game of Death: Effects of the Cold War on Our Children (1953).

In 1948, Kahn leveraged his name recognition as an author to run as the American Labor Party candidate in the 1948 U.S. House elections for New York's 25th congressional district. He finished a distant second to the incumbent Charles A. Buckley.

== Cameron & Kahn ==
At the onset of the Second Red Scare in the late 1940s, Kahn was blacklisted by mainstream publishing houses for his communist past. In 1953, Kahn and Angus Cameron, an eminent Little, Brown editor who had also been blacklisted, formed their own publishing firm, Cameron & Kahn. The firm put out controversial books, often written by blacklisted authors, on recent events such as Cedric Belfrage's Seeds of Destruction: The Truth about the U.S. Occupation of Germany; The Testament of Ethel and Julius Rosenberg, containing "death house" letters by the couple who were convicted and executed for atomic espionage; and John Wexley's The Judgment of Julius and Ethel Rosenberg, one of the first detailed critiques of the government's case against the Rosenbergs. Cameron & Kahn also released the novel The Ecstasy of Owen Muir by Hollywood Ten screenwriter Ring Lardner Jr.

=== Harvey Matusow and False Witness ===
In 1955, Cameron & Kahn published False Witness, the confession by Harvey Matusow, a former Communist and paid U.S. government witness, who admitted he had repeatedly lied under oath when testifying at House Un-American Activities Committee (HUAC) hearings. His testimony was part of the effort to root out purported communist infiltration of government, Hollywood, and publishing. Matusow's confession caused a political sensation.

Pending publication of False Witness (whose contents had been leaked publicly), the U.S. government subpoenaed Kahn, Cameron and Matusow to appear before a federal grand jury. The publishers were accused of bribing Matusow to falsely assert he had committed perjury on behalf of the government. After months of hearings and thousands of pages of testimony, the grand jury declined to issue indictments against Cameron or Kahn.

During the grand jury proceedings, Kahn, Cameron, and Matusow were also subpoenaed to testify before the U.S. Senate Internal Security Subcommittee, chaired by James Eastland (D-Mississippi). The purpose of the Senate hearings was to determine whether publication of False Witness resulted from a Communist conspiracy to induce Matusow to lie about committing perjury. The Senate committee did not inquire into the origin or consequences of his admitted perjury.

In the late 1950s, Kahn wrote an account of the Matusow scandal and its aftermath. But Kahn's account was not published until eight years after his death, as The Matusow Affair: Memoir of a National Scandal (1987). Angus Cameron wrote the Introduction to the book.

== Escaping the blacklist ==
In 1950, Kahn had his passport revoked by the U.S. State Department on the grounds that his travel abroad would be against the national interest. He was also pressured to sign an affidavit, newly required by the federal government, as to whether he was or had ever been a member of the Communist Party. This was related to the communist-hunting activities of the House Un-American Activities Committee and the allegations by Senator Joseph McCarthy (R-Wisconsin) of communist infiltration of government. The requirement to sign the affidavit was later ruled unconstitutional by the U.S. Supreme Court in a case involving Rockwell Kent, a noted painter and friend of Kahn.

Kahn was finally able to escape the blacklist in 1962 when Simon & Schuster consented to publish his book, Days With Ulanova, an intimate portrait of fabled Bolshoi Ballet ballerina Galina Ulanova. The book received critical acclaim, in particular, for its more than 300 photographs taken while Ulanova went about her daily routine.

On a trip to Moscow after Stalin's death, Kahn met with Soviet leader Nikita Khrushchev in the Kremlin. Kahn proposed that they collaborate on the Soviet leader's autobiography, but Khrushchev opted not to pursue the project.

Other later books written by Kahn included Smetana and the Beetles (Random House, 1967), a satire of the defection of Stalin's daughter to the United States; Joys and Sorrows (Simon & Schuster, 1970), cellist Pablo Casals's memoir, as told to Kahn; and The Unholy Hymnal (Simon & Schuster, 1971), a satirical exposé of the credibility gap of the Nixon administration and others.

== Personal life and death ==
In 1950, Kahn was serving as president of the Jewish People's Fraternal Order (JPFO), a member organization of the umbrella International Workers Order. With IWO president Rockwell Kent, he attended a conference sponsored by the World Peace Council that resulted in a Stockholm Appeal, appealing for worldwide nuclear disarmament.

Kahn died on September 15, 1979, of a heart attack in Glen Ellen, California.

== Bibliography ==
- Sabotage! The Secret War Against America (1942)
- The Plot Against the Peace: A Warning to the Nation! (1945)
- The Great Conspiracy Against Russia (1946)
- High Treason: The Plot Against the People (1950)
- The Game of Death: Effects of the Cold War on Our Children (1953)
- McCarthy on Trial (1954)
- Days With Ulanova: A Unique Pictorial Portrait of the Great Russian Ballerina (1962)
- Smetana and the Beetles: A Fairy Tale for Adults (1967)
- Joys and Sorrows: Pablo Casals, His Own Story as Told by Albert E. Kahn (1970)
- The Unholy Hymnal: Falsities and Delusions Rendered by President Richard M. Nixon [and Others] (1971)
- The Matusow Affair: Memoir of a National Scandal (1987, posthumous)
