= Helen Ware (violinist) =

American violinist (1887–1974)

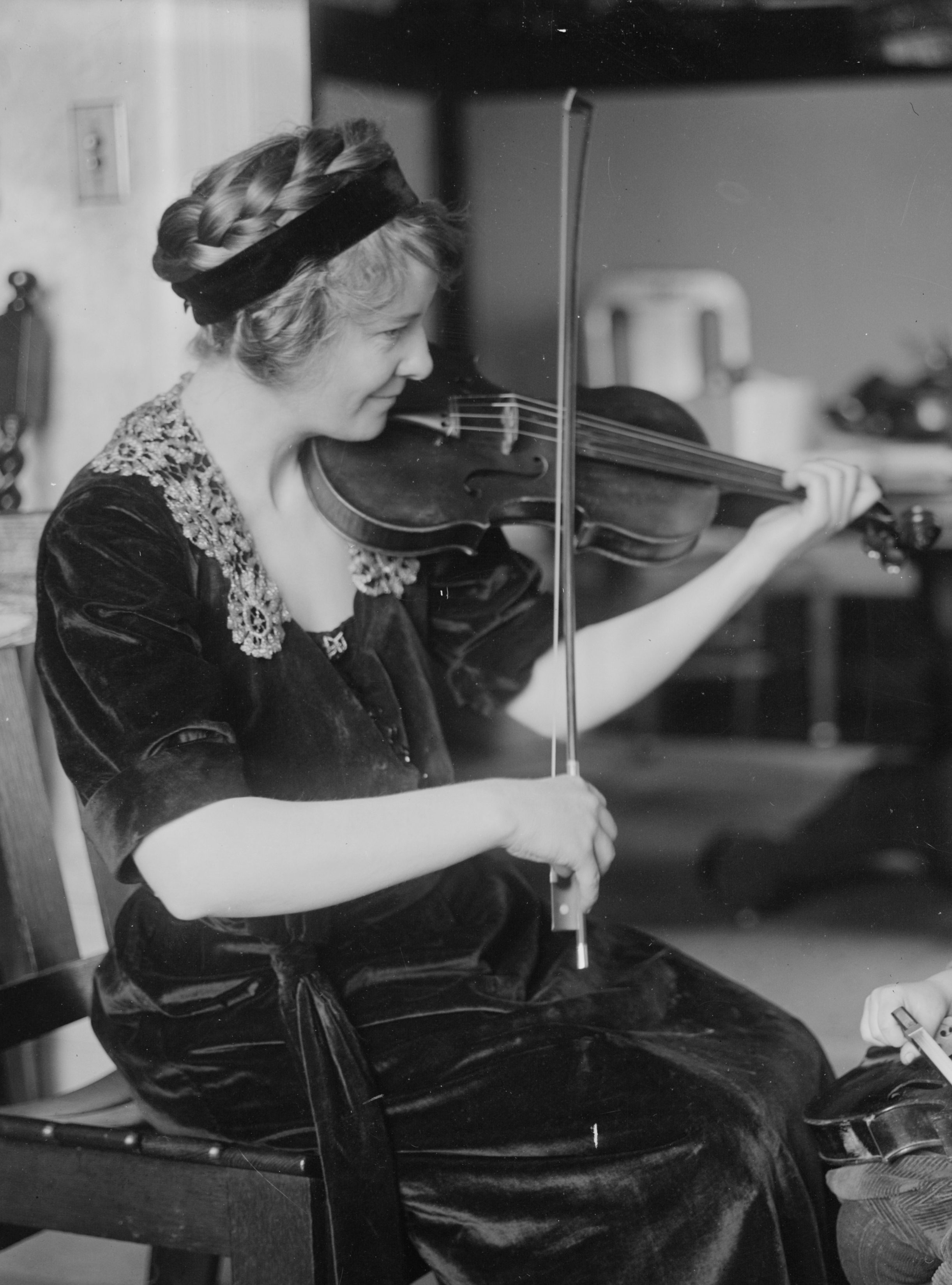
- Helen Ware, from a 1910s news photograph in the Library of Congress
- Born: September 9, 1887; Woodbury, New Jersey
- Died: September 3, 1974 (age 86); Keene, New Hampshire
- Other names: Helen Ware Schwartz, Helen Ware Cappel
- Occupations: Violinist, composer
- Children: Herta Ware
- Parent: Ella Reeve Bloor
- Relatives: Harold Ware (brother), Jessica Smith (editor) (sister-in-law), Ellen Geer (granddaughter), Willow Geer (great-granddaughter)

Helen Ware (September 9, 1887 – September 3, 1974) was an American violinist and composer.

== Early life and education ==
Helen Ware was born in Woodbury, New Jersey, the daughter of Lucien Bonaparte Ware and Ella Reeve Bloor. Her mother was founder of the Communist Labor Party of America. Her brother was Harold Ware, an expert on agriculture and an alleged Soviet spy, and his third wife was a noted Quaker pacifist and editor, Jessica Smith. Ware studied violin in Philadelphia with Frederick Han. In Europe she studied with Otakar Ševčík in Vienna and Jenő Hubay in Budapest.

== Career ==
Ware was best known for performing and composing violin music with Hungarian and Slavic themes. She played the "Old Adam" violin, an instrument once owned by a German concertmeister, Franz Adam. She also played a Stradivarius violin, the "Mr. Soames Strad". She toured in the United States in the 1910s, sometimes including her own compositions in the program. Ware made several recordings in 1914, 1915, and 1916, some of them with pianist Francis Moore, for the Victor and Edison companies. She had a summer home, "Fiddler's Camp", in Arden, Delaware.

Ware toured and performed steadily through the 1920s and 1930s, and formed a chamber trio with two other women, cellist Margaret Day and pianist Eugenia Cerniafskaya. In 1948, after her second husband died, she briefly took over his work as tour director of the United States Marine Band. In the 1950s she gave performances mostly near her home in Delaware.

Helen Ware joined the Communist Labor Party of America when her mother founded the party, in 1919. She was sometimes confused with actress Helen Ware, or composer Harriet Ware.

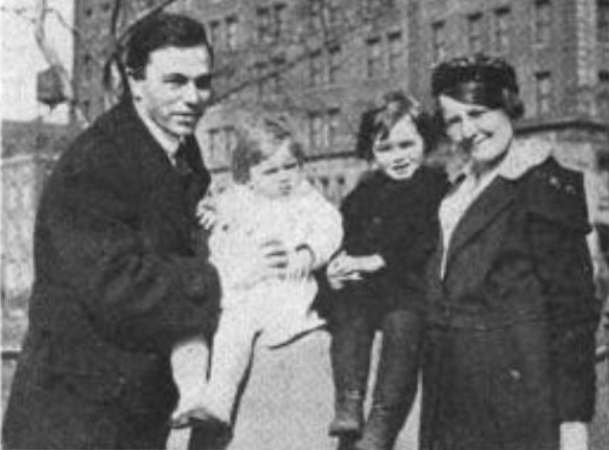
Helen Ware with her first husband, Laszlo Schwartz, and their children

== Publications ==
- "The Violin Student Abroad" (1913)
- "A Visit to Madame Remenyi" (1914)

== Personal life ==
Ware married twice. Her first husband was her manager, Hungarian-born violinist Laszlo Schwartz; they married in 1912, and had a son and daughter. Her second husband was Clarence C. Cappel, tour director of the United States Marine Band; they married in 1923, and had three children, Andor, Helen and Edward (Dan); Cappel died in 1948, and Helen Ware Cappel died on September 3, 1974, aged 86, in Keene, New Hampshire. Her daughter with Schwartz was actress Herta Ware, and her grandchildren include actress Ellen Geer. Actress Willow Geer is her great-grandchild.
