= Ella Reeve Bloor =

American labor organizer and a founder of the Communist Labor Party of America

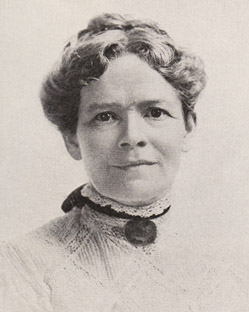
Ella Reeve Bloor as she appeared in 1910.

Ella Reeve "Mother" Bloor (July 8, 1862 – August 10, 1951) was an American labor organizer and long-time activist in the socialist and communist movements. Bloor is best remembered as one of the top-ranking female functionaries in the Communist Party USA.

== Biography ==
=== Early years ===
Ella Reeve "Mother" Bloor was born Ella Reeve on Staten Island on July 8, 1862, the daughter of Harriet Amanda (née Disbrow) and Charles Reeve. She grew up in Bridgeton, New Jersey. She was married first to Lucien Bonaparte Ware, then Louis Cohen, and finally Andrew Omholt. Ella married Lucian Ware in February 1882, at ages of 19 and 27, respectively. In the following 10 years, the couple had seven children. However, three died by the age of 3 (Pauline Stites Ware, Charles Reeve Ware, and Lucien Bonaparte Ware, Jr [twin to Harold]), leaving 4 children: Grace, Helen, Harold and Hamilton Disbrow Ware. Her daughter, Helen Ware, was a concert violinist while son, Harold Ware, became an agriculture expert as an activist in the Communist Party of America. One of her other sons was Hamilton D. "Buzz" Ware, an artist and prominent leader in the Village of Arden, Delaware, where she lived for many years. According to her later FBI files, Bloor met with Dr. M.V. Ball of Philadelphia, a student of Marx and Engels, who converted her to socialism. Ella and Lucien divorced in 1896 and the following year, at about age 35, she married Louis Cohen. In the following three years, the couple had two children: Victor Hugo Cohen and Carl M. Cohen. Ella and Louis Cohen likely divorced by 1906. In 1930, at about age 68, Ella married Andrew Omholt.

=== Early political career ===
Ella became involved in several reform movements including the prohibitionist Women's Christian Temperance Union (WCTU) and women's suffrage. She was the author of two books for children, Three Little Lovers of Nature (1895) and Talks About Authors and Their Work (1899).

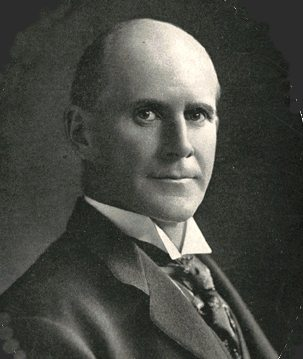
Gene Debs, railroad union organizer and key figure in the Social Democracy of America.

In 1897 Ella was a founding member of the Social Democracy of America, a new organization established by her friend Eugene V. Debs and Victor Berger — a group which would later emerge as the Social Democratic Party (SDP). She later recalled:

"When I joined the Social Democracy I was living in Brooklyn and I had married for the second time. My husband, Louis Cohen, was a socialist. I was pregnant with the first of the two children of that marriage. The railroad men [Debs supporters] came to my house so I could continue to act as [local] secretary.

"But a new disappointment was in store for me. The Social Democracy, I soon discovered, was a utopian scheme. Debs' plan was to form an ideal colony out West to show by example that socialism could work. From the outset I told the members of my group that this colonization scheme was unsound, not real socialism at all. I stayed with it for a while because of my loyalty to Debs, and because this was the nearest thing I had yet found to a socialist movement.

"Debs set up a paper in Chicago called The Social Democrat. At his request I wrote a children's column for it. The children answered the appeals of Debs and his colonization committee by sending me money. I felt it was unfair to collect money for something that did not yet exist. People were already selling out businesses to join the colony. A national convention was held in Chicago [June 7–11, 1898] and our local sent delegates. Among them was my husband who still felt that anything Debs was in must be all right. I agreed to withhold final judgment until the delegates returned. When they came back and reported that plans to establish the colony would continue, I resigned. I simply could not stay with anything so unscientific.

Shortly after her resignation from the Social Democracy, Ella attended a meeting in New York of the Socialist Labor Party, at which editor of the party newspaper Daniel DeLeon was the speaker:

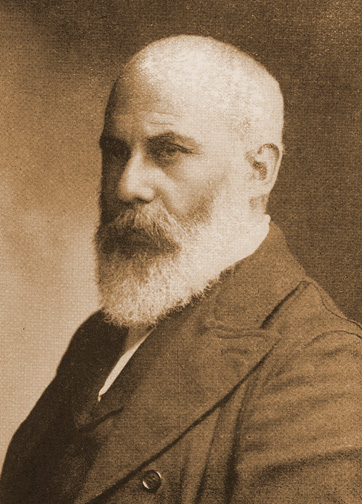
Daniel DeLeon, editor of The Weekly People, as he appeared in 1902.

"He was small and slight and prematurely gray, and spoke very deliberately and convincingly.

"The Socialist Labor Party was a revolutionary party in those days and DeLeon, its leader, was a brilliant theoretician and speaker, a courageous fighter against capitalism.... I was impressed with his analysis of the evils of the capitalist system, and of the fallacy of isolated socialist colonies as a way of achieving socialism. I felt that at last here was scientific socialism and joined the SLP.

"Daniel DeLeon and I became friends.... I became very much interested in the New York Labor News Company — the first organization that published revolutionary books and pamphlets in English on a large scale. Its manager was Julien Pierce. Together we proofread the pamphlets translated by DeLeon, often having to reconstruct the English, a greater task than we ever let him know."

Ella was elected to the governing General Executive Board of the Socialist Trade and Labor Alliance (ST&LA), the SLP's trade union affiliate. She was also the ST&LA's organizer for Essex County, New Jersey, and was sent to Philadelphia by the organization in an effort to organize street car workers there.

Ella recounted her growing disaffection with the SLP in her 1940 memoir:

"Gradually the defects of the SLP were brought home to me. I found many workers antagonistic because I was organizing a rival union. The STLA was weakening the AF of L [American Federation of Labor] by drawing off its more radical elements and leaving the reactionaries in control, and was itself organized on too narrow and sectarian a basis to accomplish anything. Furthermore, the SLP as a political party had little real influence because DeLeon was against taking part in the immediate struggles of the workers.... I began very early to see the importance of a united trade union movement, and felt that Socialists should work within the AF of L. I felt that DeLeon understood Marx very well abstractly but knew little about the practical needs of the labor movement.

"The last time I talked with DeLeon I told him I was moving to Philadelphia and was willing to accept the secretaryship of the SLP local there, which had been offered me, but I could not go along with their principles wholeheartedly. As a good friend of mine, DeLeon accepted what I said without anger, but would not change his methods."

Soon after her arrival in Philadelphia, a state convention of the SLP decided to leave the party en masse to form a new organization in the nether region between Morris Hillquit's dissident so-called "Kangaroo" faction which broke away in 1899 and DeLeon's hardline SLP. Ella opposed this new organization, which called itself "The Logical Center" and included Lucien Sanial, a former top official in the SLP. Ella had been watching with interest the formation of the Socialist Party of America (SPA) in 1901 and decided to leave her new Pennsylvania comrades to rejoin her friend Gene Debs as a member of his new organization.

In subsequent years, Bloor worked as a trade union organizer and helped during industrial disputes in Pennsylvania, Michigan, Colorado, Ohio and New York. She organized strikes across a wide range of industries including miners, hatters, steelworkers, and needle-workers.

In 1905 Bloor helped a fellow member of the Socialist Party of America, Upton Sinclair, gather information on the Chicago stock yards. Ella partnered with colleague Richard Bloor, and the last name stuck, though the pair were never married. Her work and pen-name eventually appeared in Sinclair's best-selling book, The Jungle.

Bloor ran unsuccessfully for political office several times under the Socialist Party of America, including secretary of state for Connecticut in 1908 where she was the first woman to run for state office and Lieutenant Governor of New York in 1918. In 1938 she ran for Governor of Pennsylvania under the American Communist Party.

=== Communist period ===
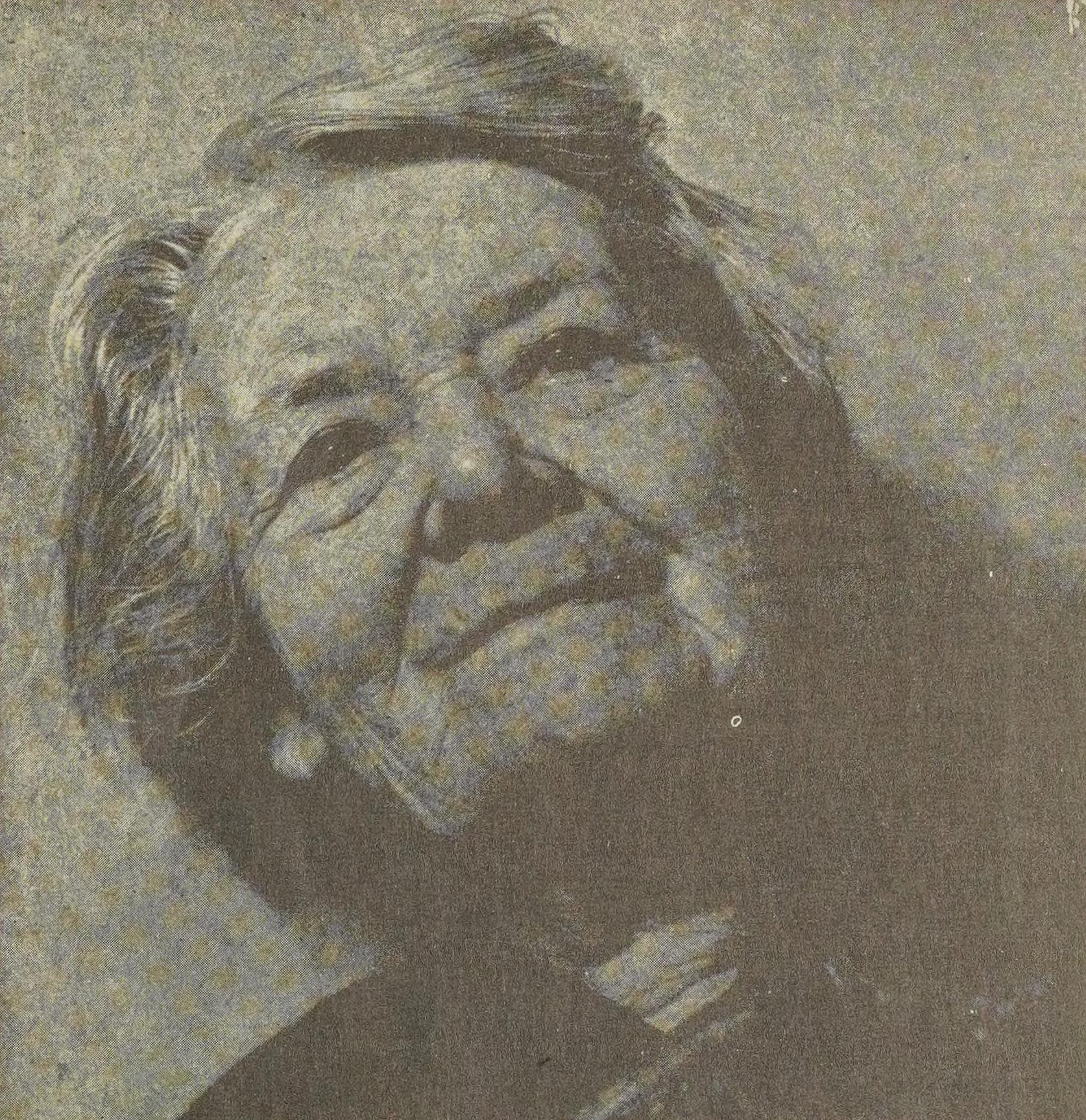
Bloor c. 1938

Ella Reeve Bloor was one of the founders of the Communist Labor Party of America, which stemmed from the Left Wing Section of the Socialist Party. In 1921 and 1922, Bloor attended the second conventions of the Comintern in Moscow. She was also a delegate to the founding convention of the Red International of Labor Unions in July 1921, at which she used the pseudonym "Emmons" and voted on the basis of credentials issued by three locals of the International Association of Machinists. Upon her return from the Soviet Union, Bloor hitchhiked throughout the United States while writing articles for the Daily Worker.

Bloor was a member of the Central Committee of the Communist Party USA from 1932 to 1948 where she organized tirelessly. During this time, she toured the Midwest, organizing farmers, leading farmers strikes, and giving speeches. Many of these speeches were focused on women's rights, especially suffrage and its connection to their rights as laborers. At the end of 1937 she returned to Russia for three months.

After the German invasion of the Soviet Union in June 1941, Bloor became an advocate of American participation in World War II. Later she argued for an early invasion of Europe to create a Second Front.

=== Death and legacy ===
Ella Reeve Bloor died on August 10, 1951, in Richlandtown, Pennsylvania. She is buried in Harleigh Cemetery in Camden, New Jersey.

Today, Ella Reeve Bloor is remembered as one of the most prominent socialist feminists in United States history. She gave countless speeches and lectures focusing on topics of women's suffrage and mobilization as workers, often stressing the “direct connection between the ballot and our work." For some, Bloor echoed the voice of working women in the early twentieth century by vocalizing the intersection of socialism and suffrage. She argued that because working women were marginalized by the law as it was, their only form of political power was through protest which frequently proved dangerous and ineffective. She was arrested 36 times during her career. She believed that women needed the right to vote if they hoped to have a say in changing laws and therefore improve their working conditions and lives in general.

Bloor's autobiography, We Are Many, was published in 1940 and served as the basis for the Woody Guthrie song, "1913 Massacre."

Life photographed Bloor's public funeral reception in Harlem. Alice Neel's 1951 painting of her funeral reception, "The Death of Mother Bloor," shows her in front of a line of mourners passing by her bier. It was included in the 2021 Alice Neel retrospective at the Metropolitan Museum of Art in New York City.

Her granddaughter was actress Herta Ware who was married to Will Geer from 1934 to 1954.

== Works ==
Children's books

- Three Little Lovers of Nature. Chicago: A. Flanagan, 1895.
- Talks About Authors and their Work. Chicago: A. Flanagan, 1899.

Political titles

- Women in the Soviet Union. New York: Workers Library Publishers, 1937.
- We Are Many: An Autobiography. New York: International Publishers, 1940.

== See also ==
- Italian Hall disaster
