= Hollywood on Trial =

1976 film

- Directed by: David Helpern
- Written by: Arnie Reisman
- Produced by: James Gutman; David Helpern Jr.
- Cinematography: Barry Abrams
- Edited by: Frank Galvin
- Distributed by: Corinth Films
- Release date: November 1976
- Running time: 105 minutes
- Country: United States
- Language: English

Hollywood on Trial is a 1976 American documentary film directed by David Helpern.

== Synopsis ==
The film chronicles the 1947 hearings of the House Un-American Activities Committee, with a focus on the Hollywood Ten directors, screenwriters and producers cited for contempt of Congress and blacklisted by the movie industry after refusing to answer questions about their alleged involvement with the Communist Party. The documentary is narrated by John Huston and includes archival footage from the hearings and interviews with key participants in the hearings and studio figures affected by those events.

== Accolades ==
It was nominated for an Academy Award for Best Documentary Feature, but lost to Barbara Kopple's Harlan County USA.

== Cast ==
- John Huston - Narrator
- Walter Bernstein - Himself
- Alvah Bessie - Himself
- Lester Cole - Himself
- Gary Cooper - Himself (archive footage)
- Henry Daniell - Himself (archive footage)
- Howard Da Silva - Himself
- Walt Disney - Himself (archive footage)
- Edward Dmytryk - Himself
- Will Geer - Himself
- Millard Lampell - Himself
- Ring Lardner Jr. - Himself
- Albert Maltz - Himself
- Ben Margolis - Himself
- Louis B. Mayer - Himself (archive footage)
- Joseph McCarthy - Himself (archive footage)
- Zero Mostel - Himself
- Otto Preminger - Himself
- Ronald Reagan - Himself
- Martin Ritt - Himself
- Dore Schary - Himself
- Gale Sondergaard - Herself
- Leo Townsend - Himself
- Dalton Trumbo - Himself
