= Peter Alsop =

American musician

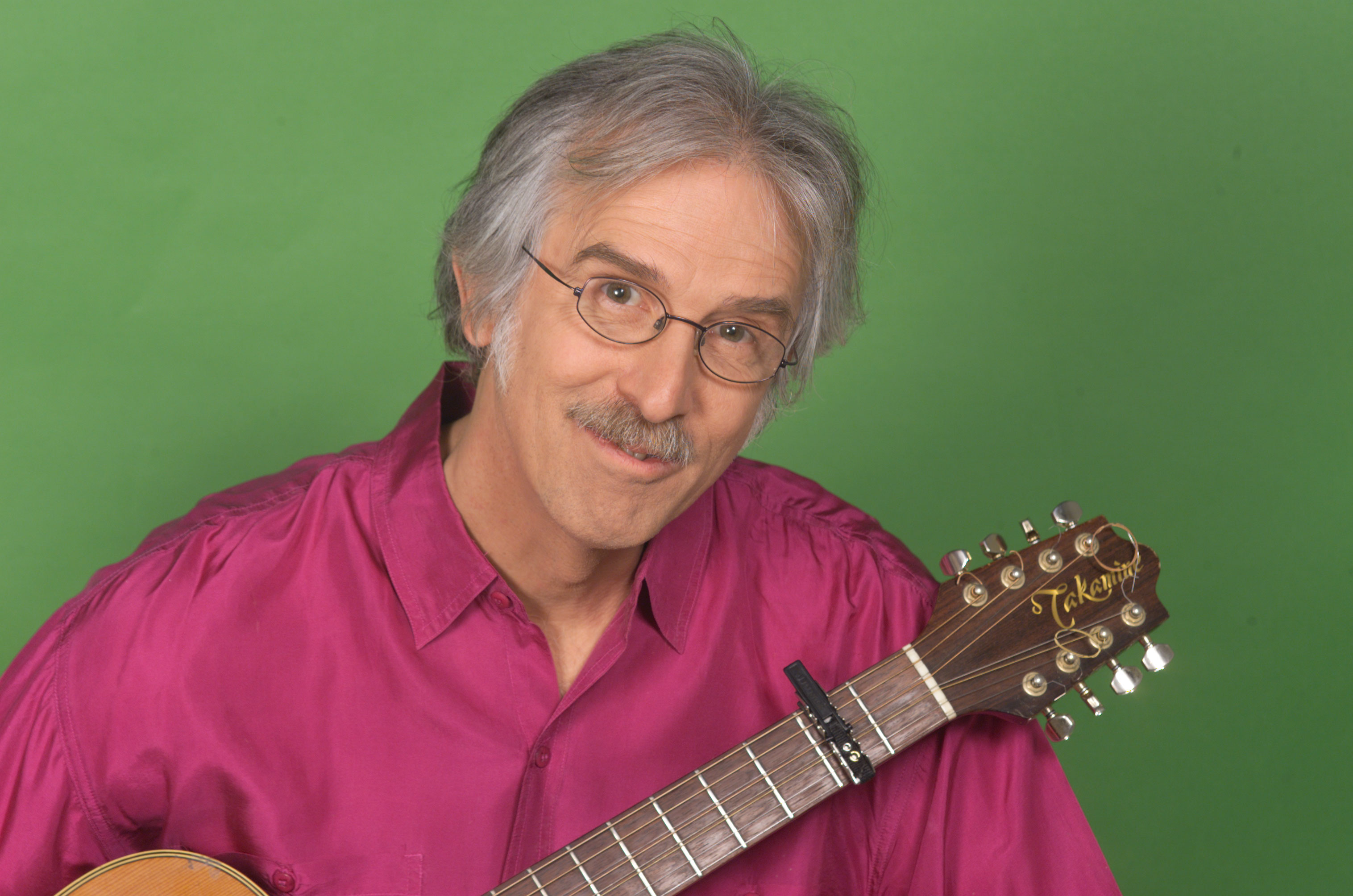
- Peter Alsop
- Born: September 18, 1946 (age 79); Connecticut
- Occupations: director, teacher
- Spouse: Ellen Geer (m. 1975)
- Children: 3, including Willow Geer
- Website: www.peteralsop.com

Peter Alsop (born September 18, 1946) is an American singer-songwriter whose work has ranged from children's music to satirical music for adults.

== Early life and education ==
Alsop was born in 1946 in Connecticut, and raised in an alcoholic family. He attended Trinity College in Hartford, Connecticut, graduating with a BA in Religion in 1968. He then attended Columbia University Teachers College and Columbia Pacific University, graduating with a PhD. in educational psychology.

== Work with children ==
Prior to his musical career, Alsop worked as the director of The Harbor Schools Residential Treatment Center for emotionally disturbed adolescents in Maine, and as a New York City elementary school teacher in the South Bronx.

== Musical career ==
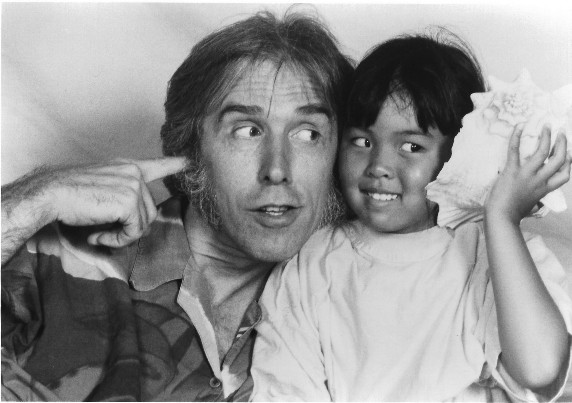
Alsop and a child demonstrate different ways of dealing with noise.

Alsop has been producing children's, educational and humorous music since 1975. He received a Parents' Choice Award for his 2010 album Grow It At Home.

== Personal life ==
Alsop married actress Ellen Geer, the daughter of actor Will Geer, in 1975. The couple live in Topanga, California; they have two daughters, artist/photographer Megan Geer-Alsop and actress Willow Geer-Alsop.

== Discography ==
- Peter Alsop (1975)
- Asleep at the Helm (1977)
- Draw the Line (1980)
- Uniforms (1981)
- Wha'D'Ya Wanna do!? (1983)
- Fan Club Favorites (1985)
- Take Me with You! (1986)
- Stayin' Over (1987)
- In The Hospital (1989) w. Bill Harley
- Family Roles (1991)
- Pluggin' Away (1991)
- Chris Moose Holidays (1994)
- Songs on Loss & Grief (1997)
- Songs on Recovery & Addiction (1997)
- Songs on Sex & Sexuality (1997)
- Did You Walk? (2001)
- Uh-Oh! (2002)
- Ebenezer's Make-over (2004)
- Disciples Of PerFection (2010)
- Grow It At Home (2010)
- River Of Life (2014)
- Camping With Dads (2020)

== Videography ==
- Here We Go Volume 1 (1987)
- Opening Doors (1988)
- Costume Party (1988)
- Wake Up (1992)
- When Jesus Was a Kid (1993)
- Get Real! (1995)
- When Kids Say Goodbye (1995)
- After Romeo (1998)
- Sometimes Si, Sometimes No! (2007)

== See also ==
- Bill Harley
