= Lester Cole =

American screenwriter (1904–1985)

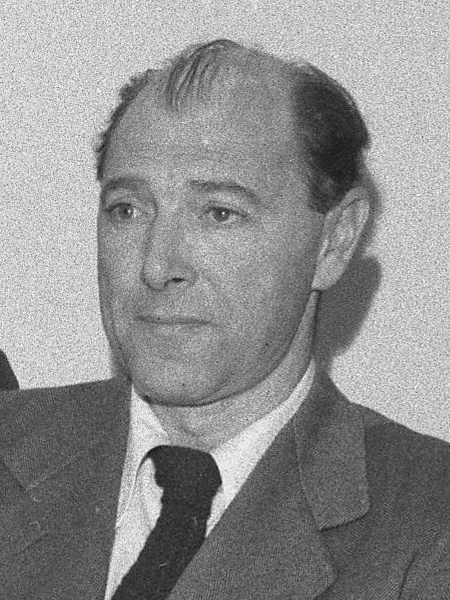
- Cole in 1947
- Born: Lester Cohn; June 19, 1904; New York, New York
- Died: August 15, 1985 (aged 81); San Francisco, California
- Other names: J. Redmond Prior; Lewis Copley; Gerald L. C. Copley
- Occupation: Screenwriter
- Spouse(s): Jeanne March (m. 1935, divorced) Isabel Dowden Johnson (m. 1953, divorced) Katharine Hogle (m. 1956, separated)
- Children: 2

Lester Cole (born Lester Cohn; June 19, 1904 – August 15, 1985) was an American screenwriter. His film credits include The House of the Seven Gables (1940), Objective, Burma! (1945), and The Romance of Rosy Ridge (1947). He is best known as one of the "Hollywood Ten"—the group of screenwriters and directors cited for contempt of Congress, and subsequently blacklisted and imprisoned, for refusing to testify regarding their alleged involvement with the Communist Party.

== Early years ==
Lester Cohn was born into a Jewish family of Polish immigrants in New York City. His father was a Marxist garment industry union organiser who influenced the development of his son's socialist ideology. Lester's parents divorced when he was ten, and his mother gained custody of him and his sister. The family moved multiple times, and he struggled as a student. At age 16, he left home and dropped out of high school.

When seeking employment, Lester learned that "in an anti-Semitic world, such a name as Cohn was an obvious handicap." He changed it to "Cole" (a shortening of the last name "Kolitnyevsky" that his father had told immigration officials when arriving at Ellis Island), and soon landed a job as a shipping clerk. With his love of theater, Cole applied for work in the New York theater district. He eventually obtained backstage jobs as well as roles as a supporting actor. He was a featured cast member in the musical comedy Peggy-Ann, which opened on Broadway in December 1926. He also began writing plays.

== Film career ==
After Cole had two of his plays produced in New York, he signed a five-year, $250-a-week contract as a screenwriter with Paramount Pictures. He relocated to Hollywood in 1932 where his first assignment was to collaborate with over a dozen other writers on If I Had a Million. In 1933 he teamed with John Howard Lawson and Samuel Ornitz to establish the Screen Writers Guild. The next year, Cole joined the Communist Party.

Between 1932 and 1947, he wrote more than forty screenplays that were made into motion pictures. He incorporated left-leaning political commentary in many of his scripts.

== Blacklisting ==
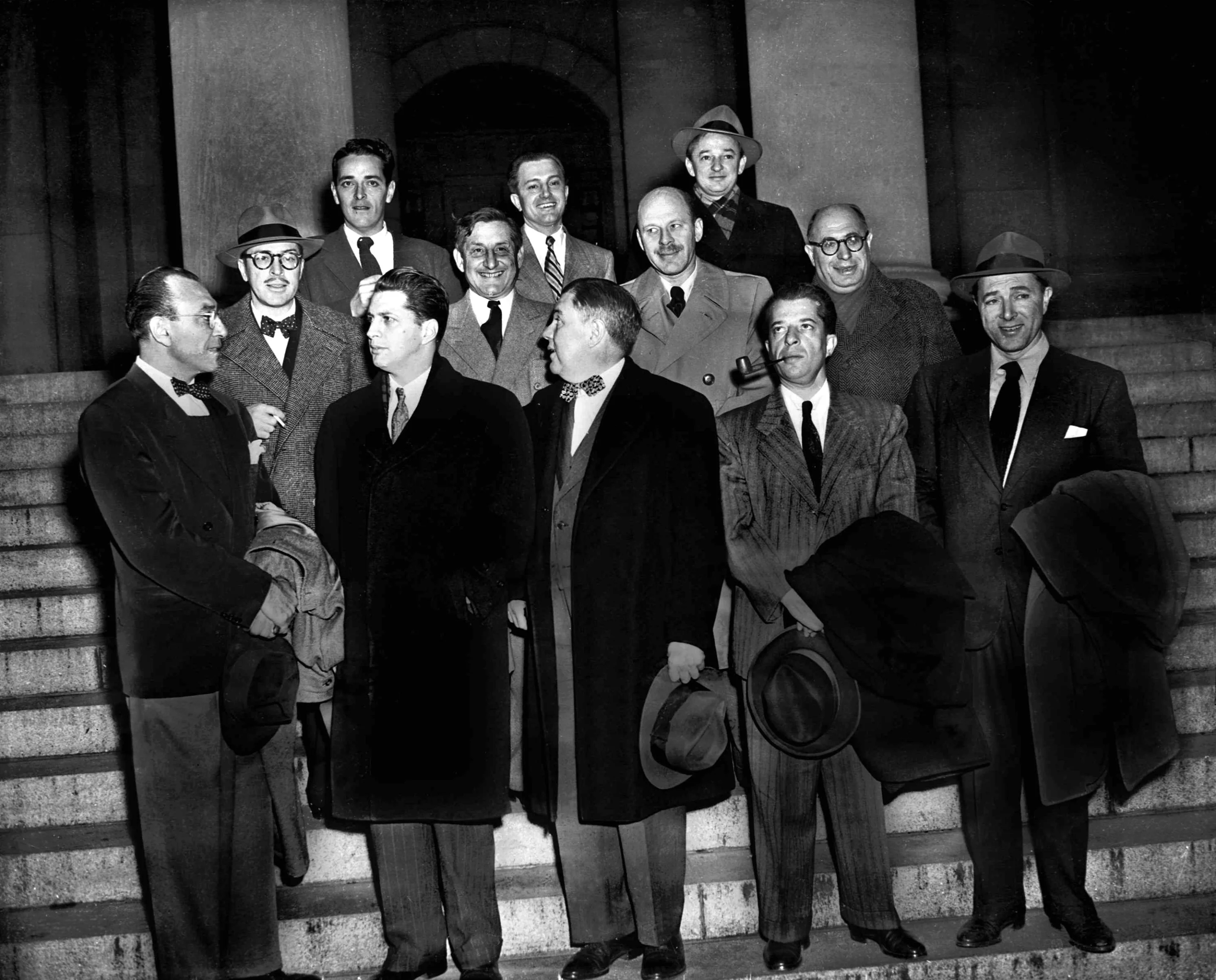
"The Hollywood Ten" stand with their attorneys outside district court in Washington, D.C. before arraignment on contempt of Congress charges. The ten men were charged with refusing to cooperate with the House Un-American Activities Committee. (Front row, L-R): Herbert Biberman, attorney Martin Popper, attorney Robert W. Kenny, Albert Maltz and Lester Cole. (Second row, L-R): Dalton Trumbo, John Howard Lawson, Alvah Bessie and Samuel Ornitz. (Top row, L-R): Ring Lardner Jr., Edward Dmytryk and Adrian Scott.

In 1947, Cole became one of the Hollywood Ten who refused to answer questions before the House Committee on Un-American Activities (HUAC) about their Communist Party membership. Specifically, he was first asked whether he was a member of the Screen Writers Guild, and then whether he was a member of the Communist Party. He replied that it wasn't a simple "Yes|No" matter but required a more complete response, which he had prepared in a written statement. But unlike most other HUAC witnesses, Cole was not permitted to read the statement into the Congressional Record because his statement was sharply critical of the House committee itself. After a few minutes of back-and-forth, HUAC Chairman J. Parnell Thomas realized they were at an impasse and excused the witness.

Cole was convicted of contempt of Congress, fined $1,000, and sentenced to twelve months confinement (along with fellow Hollywood Ten member Ring Lardner Jr.) at the Federal Correctional Institution at Danbury, Connecticut, of which Cole served ten months.

As a result of his refusal to cooperate with the HUAC, Cole was blacklisted by studio executives. In the next couple of decades, only three of his screenplays—for which he used three different pseudonyms: J. Redmond Prior, Lewis Copley, and Gerald L. C. Copley—were made into films. The most commercially successful of the films was Born Free (1966), credited to Gerald L. C. Copley. Cole said in 1967: "I did it for 15 percent of what my salary was before I was blacklisted."

== Personal life ==
Cole was married three times. His first two marriages ended in divorce, and he separated from his third wife. He married his first wife Jeanne "Jonnie" March in 1935. Together they joined the Communist Party. The couple had two sons and divorced in 1952. He was then briefly married to Isabel (Dowden) Johnson, who later married Alger Hiss. Cole and Katharine Hogle married in 1956 and separated in 1977.

== Later years ==
In contrast with other Hollywood Ten members such as Dalton Trumbo and Ring Lardner Jr., who were allowed to work again in the 1960s and '70s under their own names, Cole was never "un-blacklisted". He remarked about this period: "The Blacklist was still in effect for some, certainly for John Howard Lawson and myself.... The Un-American Activities Committee was gone, but its ghost was alive and well in Hollywood."

In 1981, Cole published his autobiography, Hollywood Red. In it, he recounted a 1978 incident when he phoned into a radio talk show on which ex-Communist Budd Schulberg was a guest. Cole wrote that he berated Schulberg (who had testified before HUAC as a friendly witness and "named names"), calling him a "canary" and a "stool pigeon":

"Aren't you the canary who sang before the un-American Committee? Aren't you that canary? Or are you another bird, a pigeon – the stool kind.... Just sing, canary, sing, you bastard!"

Cole added that he was then abruptly cut off the air. About this incident, Kenneth Lloyd Billingsley comments, "Whether this actually happened is uncertain, but one can guess."

In his last years, Cole taught screenwriting at the University of California at Berkeley and at a New York University Summer Writers Conference in Vermont. As Ronald Radosh observes, Cole "remained a hardcore Communist" until the very end.

Lester Cole died at the University of California-San Francisco Medical Center on August 15, 1985. It was ten days after he had suffered a heart attack. He was 81.

== Selected filmography ==
- If I Had a Million (1932)
- Walls of Gold (1933)
- Nothing More Than a Woman (1934)
- Under Pressure (1935)
- Hitch Hike Lady (1935)
- The Jury's Secret (1938)
- Midnight Intruder (1938)
- The Crime of Doctor Hallet (1938)
- Secrets of a Nurse (1938)
- Pirates of the Skies (1939)
- The House of the Seven Gables (1940)
- Footsteps in the Dark (1941)
- Among the Living (1941)
- Pacific Blackout (1941)
- Hostages (1943)
- None Shall Escape (1944)
- Objective, Burma! (1945)
- Blood on the Sun (1945)
- Men in Her Diary (1945)
- The Romance of Rosy Ridge (1947)
- High Wall (1947)
- Operation Eichmann (1961) – credited to Lewis Copley
- Born Free (1966) – credited to Gerald L. C. Copley

== See also ==
- The Hollywood Ten documentary
- Hollywood on Trial
