= Hard Traveling =

- Directed by: Dan Bessie
- Written by: Dan Bessie
- Based on: Bread and a Stone by Alvah Bessie
- Produced by: Helen Garvy
- Starring: J. E. Freeman; Ellen Geer; Barry Corbin
- Cinematography: David Myers
- Edited by: Susan Heick
- Music by: Ernie Sheldon
- Distributed by: New World Pictures
- Release date: August 27, 1986 (New York City)
- Running time: 98 minutes 99 minutes
- Country: United States
- Language: English

Hard Traveling is a 1986 American drama film written and directed by Dan Bessie and starring J. E. Freeman, Ellen Geer and Barry Corbin. It is based on the 1941 novel Bread and a Stone by Alvah Bessie, the father of Dan Bessie.

== Premise ==
Illiterate and unemployed, Ed Sloan marries widowed schoolteacher Norah Gilbert and becomes the stepfather of her two sons; but after not being able to find employment, Ed ends up murdering a businessman.

== Cast ==
- J. E. Freeman as Ed Sloan
- Ellen Geer as Norah Gilbert Sloan
- Barry Corbin as Frank Burton
- James Gammon as Sergeant Slattery
- Jim Haynie as Lieutenant Fisher
- Charles Martinet as District Attorney Cobb
- W. Scott DeVenney as Bill Gilbert

== Reception ==
Walter Goodman of The New York Times gave the film a negative review and wrote, "A true story? Sure. It's true to an ideology-generated fiction that was always false to life and to art."

Kevin Thomas of the Los Angeles Times also gave it a negative review and wrote that the film "is all the more disappointing because it so clearly could have been so much better."
