= Lonely Hearts (1991 film) =

- Directed by: Andrew Lane
- Written by: R.E. Daniels; Andrew Lane
- Produced by: Robert Kenner; Andrew Lane
- Starring: Eric Roberts; Beverly D'Angelo
- Cinematography: Paul Ryan
- Edited by: Julian Semilian
- Music by: David McHugh
- Release date: 1991
- Running time: 109 minutes
- Country: United States
- Language: English

Lonely Hearts is a 1991 American thriller film written and directed by Andrew Lane and starring Eric Roberts and Beverly D'Angelo.

== Plot ==
A lonely woman, Alma, becomes obsessed with a con man, Frank. She even poses as his sister to help him trick other women. She soon falls for the con man, who steals her money after seducing her. Frank does not want Alma around him, but he cannot do anything about the situation in case she goes to the police. Hot on their trail is a female private detective, working for another of Frank's victims.

== Cast ==
- Eric Roberts as Frank
- Beverly D'Angelo as Alma
- Joanna Cassidy as Erin Randall
- Herta Ware as Gran
- Bibi Besch as Maria Wilson
- Rebecca Street as Jane Ericson
- Miriam Flynn as Helen
- Sharon Farrell as Louise
- Sandy Baron as The Apartment Manager
- Ellen Geer as Martha
- Marlyn Mason as Beverly Ross
- Charles Napier as Robby Ross
- Danny Trejo as The Angry Client
