= Theatricum Botanicum =

Theater in Topanga, California, U.S.

Coordinates: 34.1113°N 118.5932°W

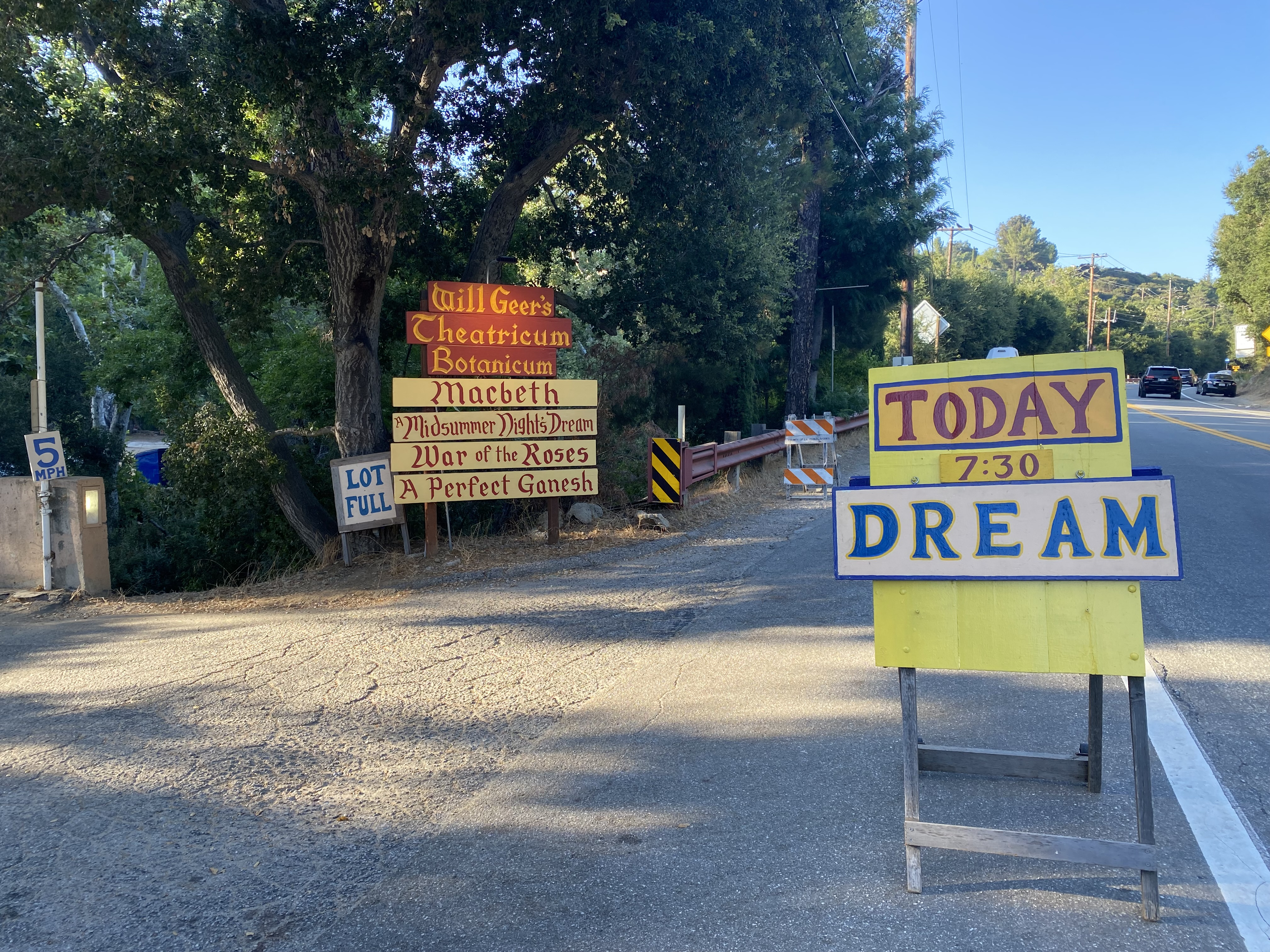
The entrance to the Will Geer Theatricum Botanicum

The Will Geer Theatricum Botanicum is an open-air theater in Topanga Canyon, Los Angeles County, California. It was founded in 1973 by American actor Will Geer (who had a master's degree in botany), and is still owned and operated by his family. It is named after the English botanist John Parkinson's 1640 herbal, Theatrum Botanicum.

Set in the natural amphitheater of a mountain canyon, the Theatricum Botanicum is traditionally used for performances of William Shakespeare's plays, as well as modern plays and music concerts. The ashes of Geer and his former wife Herta Ware are at the site, along with a bust in Geer's likeness.

== History ==
The Theatricum Botanicum originated in the early 1950s, when Will Geer was blacklisted for refusing to testify before the House Committee on Un-American Activities. Unable to find work in Hollywood, he sold his house in Santa Monica and moved to Topanga Canyon, where he began selling produce and opened a theatre for blacklisted actors and folk singers. Geer's friend Woody Guthrie had a small shack on the property.

When Geer returned to popularity in the 1970s from his role as Grandpa in The Waltons, in 1973 he re-gathered his family (who were now working actors at theatres across the country) and together they formed the Will Geer Theatricum Botanicum, a non-profit hosting free workshop performances of Shakespeare, folk plays, and concerts featuring artists as Pete Seeger, Arlo Guthrie, Della Reese, and Burl Ives. Geer combined his acting and botanical careers at the Theatricum, by making sure that every plant mentioned in Shakespeare was grown there. Geer's former wife Herta Ware helped develop the outdoor summer theatre.

After Geer's death in 1978, the family and a small band of players decided to work towards becoming a professional repertory theatre, incorporating educational programs and musical events. The local community and surrounding environs encouraged the theatre's artistic goals and proved their support by donating the labor and materials to begin a campaign which would expand and improve the theatre's facilities.

When the Santa Monica Pier blew down in a storm in 1983, salvaged wooden planks were used to build the main stage. 1983 also marked the first year of realizing the Theatricum's goal of providing its principal performers with an Equity contract; today the 299-seat outdoor amphitheatre is one of the few mid-size union houses in the L.A. area, receiving critical praise and numerous awards including the prestigious Margaret Harford Award for Sustained Excellence from the Los Angeles Drama Critics Circle, and the LA Weekly Career Achievement Award for Artistic Director Ellen Geer.

From 1987 to the present, eight original plays have been included in the theatre's annual Repertory of Classics, which revolves around at least one Shakespeare play. Peter Alsop's Kid's Koncerts have become a regular addition to the Repertory Season, along with Theatre for Kids by Creative PlayGround, and each spring and fall the theatre is home to a range of concerts, including numerous benefits.

In past years, the Theatricum has included special entertainment in its seasons such as American Stories, a concert performance series for families, students, and educators; Outdoor Cabaret, for nighttime shows; the Woody Guthrie Show; and pre-show discussions in a Prologue Series.

Renovation of the Theatricum's scenic mainstage amphitheatre was completed in 1997, an architectural re-design and overhaul which maintains the natural aesthetics the theatre has become known for, while enhancing the venue's comfort and accessibility. The renovation was financed by the Irvine Foundation, Weingart Foundation, and the Ralph M. Parsons Foundation.
