= Objective, Burma! =

1945 film by Raoul Walsh

- Original film poster
- Directed by: Raoul Walsh
- Written by: Alvah Bessie (story)
- Screenplay by: Ranald MacDougall; Lester Cole
- Produced by: Jerry Wald
- Starring: Errol Flynn; James Brown; William Prince
- Narrated by: Truman Bradley
- Cinematography: James Wong Howe
- Edited by: George Amy
- Music by: Franz Waxman
- Production company: Warner Bros. Pictures
- Distributed by: Warner Bros. Pictures
- Release dates: January 26, 1945 (New York City); February 17, 1945 (USA)
- Running time: 142 minutes
- Country: United States
- Language: English
- Budget: $1,592,000
- Box office: $3,961,000

Objective, Burma! is a 1945 American war film that is very loosely based on the six-month raid by Merrill's Marauders against the Imperial Japanese Army during the Burma Campaign in the Second World War. The film, which was made by Warner Bros. Pictures, starred Errol Flynn. It was directed by Raoul Walsh.

The film was banned for seven years in the United Kingdom because its fictionalized plot turned the Burma Campaign into an entirely American operation without acknowledging that the British Empire was actually undertaking most of the fighting; with the United States in a supporting role. Nevertheless it was one of the most popular movies of 1945 in France.

The film's plot is almost the same as Northwest Passage, a 1940 MGM production about Rogers' Rangers, set in 1759 and starring Spencer Tracy as Robert Rogers.

== Plot ==
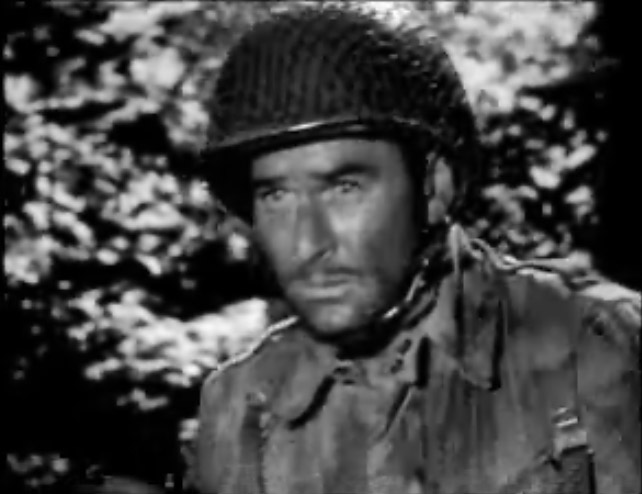
Errol Flynn playing Captain Nelson, the group's heroic leader.

A group of United States Army paratroopers led by Captain Nelson are dropped into Burma to locate and destroy a camouflaged Japanese Army radar station that is detecting Allied aircraft flying into China. For their mission, they are assigned Gurkha guides, a Chinese Army Captain and an older war correspondent whose character is used to explain various procedures to the audience.

The mission is an overwhelming success as the 36-man team quickly take out the station and its personnel. But when the airborne troops arrive at an old airstrip to be taken back to their base, they find the Japanese waiting for them at their rendezvous site. Captain Nelson makes the hard decision to call off the rescue planes, and hike out on foot.

To reduce the likelihood of detection, the group splits into two smaller units and plans to meet up at a deserted Burmese village. But when Nelson arrives at the meeting place, there's no sign of the other group. Eventually, they find a wounded comrade, Hollis, who tells them that the Japanese ambushed the other unit. The remaining soldiers head out on foot and come across an enemy encampment where the captured troops have been held prisoner but discover, to their horror, that they have all been tortured and mutilated. Only Lt. Jacobs remains alive long enough to relate what happened and begs Nelson to kill him before he dies of his injuries. The surviving group is attacked by returning Japanese soldiers and forced to retreat into the jungle. The men must then cross the swamps in their attempt to make it back to safety through the enemy-occupied jungle.

Fighting an almost constant rearguard action, Nelson's paratroopers also succeed as decoys leading Japanese troops away from the site of the British 1944 aerial invasion of Burma. They manage to reach the invasion force and are flown back to their base.

== Cast ==
- Errol Flynn as Captain Nelson
- James Brown as SSgt. Treacy
- William Prince as Lt. Sid Jacobs
- George Tobias as Cpl. Gabby Gordon
- Henry Hull as Mark Williams
- Warner Anderson as Col. J. Carter
- John Alvin as Hogan
- Stephen Richards as Lt. Barker
- Dick Erdman as Pvt. Nebraska Hooper

Uncredited Cast

- Erville Alderson as General Stilwell
- William Hudson as Fred Hollis
- Anthony Caruso as Miggleori
- George Tyne as Soapy Higgins
- Rodd Redwing as Sergeant Chattau
- Hugh Beaumont as Captain Hennessey
- Lester Matthews as the British Major Fitzpatrick

== Production ==
=== Development ===
Jerry Wald claimed he had the idea for doing a film set in Burma in Christmas 1943, feeling this particular theatre of the war would soon be active, and hoping the movie could be made and released before then.

Lester Cole says the original story was written by Alvah Bessie who wrote a "dozen or so" pages before being pulled off the project by Wald and assigned to something else. The job of writing the story and screenplay was given to Cole and a new writer for film, Ranald MacDougall. MacDougall had been a creator and co-writer of the CBS radio series The Man Behind the Gun that was awarded a 1942 Peabody Award. He had been contracted to Warner Brothers, with this his second film after uncredited work on Pride of the Marines. "Ranald was a pleasure to work with," wrote Cole later, "bright, eager to learn, a facile writer of dialogue: we got along famously."

In his memoirs, Cole claims Wald was inspired by a book about an attempted British invasion of Burma called Merrill's Marauders, and he decided to change the troops from being British to American. However, Merrill's Marauders was an American unit.

The film was announced in January 1944, with Wald and Walsh attached. Errol Flynn was already being discussed as the star. Franchot Tone was mentioned as a possible co-star.

Cole says Walsh had "contempt for writers" but that Wald made him stick to the script. Wald acknowledged that the plot bore a significant similarity to the 1940 film Northwest Passage.

=== Filming ===
The production began in April 1944. Exteriors started at the Los Angeles County Arboretum and Botanic Garden, California on May 1, 1944. The schedule was for 60 days but shooting required more than 40 extra days due to bad weather and constant script changes. Scenes are notable for using authentic World War II American military material such as weapons, aircraft and gliders. A large amount of actual combat footage filmed by U.S. Army Signal Corps cameramen in the China-Burma-India theatre as well as New Guinea was used in the completed film.

Walsh reported during filming Flynn "was on his good behaviour because he was writing a book when I was not using him. Between being gung ho and typing his life story he had no time for anything more than a half a dozen drinks, which for him was almost total abstention."

Unfortunately the Allied Burma campaign was already well underway when the production started; this stopped Wald releasing the film in the same way Casablanca premiered just weeks after the launch of Operation Torch in 1942 (when US forces joined the British to invade French North Africa)

== Release ==
According to Warner Bros records, Objective, Burma! earned $2,117,000 domestically and $1,844,000 foreign. It was the studio's sixth most popular film of the year, after Hollywood Canteen, To Have and Have Not, Arsenic and Old Lace, God Is My Co-Pilot and Christmas in Connecticut. The film was also one of the most popular movies of 1945 in France, with over 2.6 million admissions.

== Reception ==
The New York Times wrote: "This is without question one of the best war films yet made in Hollywood. There are no phony heroics by Errol Flynn or any of the other members of a uniformly excellent cast. These boys conduct themselves like real soldiers and even the newspaper correspondent is a credit to the craft. The Warners have erred only in the film's excessive length. It runs approximately two hours and twenty minutes, or roughly thirty minutes more than appears to be absolutely necessary."

Variety noted: "The film has considerable movement, particularly in the early reels and the tactics of the paratroopers are authentic in their painstaking detail. However, while the scripters have in the main achieved their purpose of heightening the action, there are scenes in the final reels that could have been edited more closely."

Harrison's Reports wrote: "Very good! It ranks with the best of the war melodramas yet produced ... While the action holds one's interest all the way through, a cut of ten to fifteen minutes in the running time would not affect its dramatic punch." Film Daily wrote: "The picture impresses with its air of authenticity and the vivid realism that has gone into the telling of its story, and it possesses almost unremitting action crowded with the starkest of drama ... The primary fault of the film is that it is dragged out beyond all reason. There is much repetitious material that could be cut out to the improvement of the film."

Filmink called the film: "serious, hard and lacks any sort of female interest – the enemy are ruthless and clever and the soldiers still wisecrack, but they are professional, no-nonsense killers who follow orders and get along with each other (unless really stressed) i.e. there is no contrived in-fighting."

The Washington Star thought the film overlong - “It is one thing for an actual mission to be that long, quite another for a movie based upon it, a truth that has not yet occurred to Hollywood” - and too familiar, despite the novel location: “The characters...are pretty much the same ones who have fought through other cinema military missions....The dramatic incident devised to break the monotony of the jungle trek in Objective Burma has become the familiar material of a dozen such films....for the most part things happen just as they always have under the circumstances. Even the comedy exchanges, in most of which the cynical Gotham cabbie participates, have the ring of something you have heard before in exactly the same words.”

The Times (London), aware of the Allies’ very cosmopolitan forces in Burma, was displeased: “This long film has met with objections from American service men, and it is indeed a little extraordinary for it to imply that the Burma campaign was fought almost entirely without the aid of the British. There is one reference to the Fourteenth Army; during the course of the action it is rashly presumed by one of the party of American parachutists that a British outpost may be somewhere about, but this suggestion is promptly snubbed, and for the rest Mr. Flynn and the indomitable band he leads have it all their own way....the Japanese are shown as contemptibly inefficient fighters in their own kind of territory, and not all the parade of stubble chins and sweat-grimed faces can disguise the film’s lack of honesty in its account of a particular operation as well as of the general campaign.”

Writing in The Nation in 1945, critic James Agee stated, " ... the players, by always saying the apt line at the apt moment and by almost every other means possible, continually remind you that they are, after all, just actors, and that none of this is really happening ... However good they may be, known actors in this sort of semi-documentary film inevitably blunt the edge of your best hopes and intentions ... The people who made Objective Burma are by no means specially to be criticized on these grounds; the criticism applies with equal justice to every American fictional war film I have seen. Indeed, Objective Burma is one of the best of them."

On the review aggregator website Rotten Tomatoes, 86% of 7 critics' reviews are positive. Metacritic, which uses a weighted average, assigned the film a score of 79 out of 100, based on 10 critics, indicating "generally favorable" reviews.

== Controversies ==
=== British objections ===
Even though it was based on the exploits of Merrill's Marauders, Objective Burma was withdrawn from release in the United Kingdom after it infuriated the British public. Prime Minister Winston Churchill protested the Americanization of the huge and almost entirely British, Indian and Commonwealth conflict ('1 million men').

The Objective, Burma! London 1945 premiere was remarkable: At a line in the script, (by an American, to the effect) "We should head north, I hear there might be a few Brits somewhere over there" - The entire (English) audience walked out in outrage. It got a second release in the United Kingdom in 1952, when it was shown with an accompanying apology. The movie was also banned in Singapore although it was seen in Burma and India.

An editorial in The Times said:

It is essential both for the enemy and the Allies to understand how it came about that the war was won ... nations should know and appreciate the efforts other countries than their own made to the common cause.

=== Civilian Flynn ===
There were also objections to 35-year-old Errol Flynn playing the hero. He had remained in Hollywood during the war, unlike actors such as Clarke Gable, Tyrone Power, David Niven or James Stewart who were all serving in the Allied military. Actually Australian-born Flynn had become a naturalised American citizen on 14 August 1942 when the United States had become fully involved in the Second World War. He had tried to enlist but he failed the Selective Training and Service physical exam due to recurrent malaria (contracted in New Guinea), a heart murmur, various venereal diseases and latent pulmonary tuberculosis. As Warner Bros refused to admit that Flynn, the star they marketed for his physical beauty and athleticism, had been rejected for military service due to health problems (IV-F), Flynn would be named in the Press and by critics as a "draft dodger".

== Nominations ==
The film was nominated for three Oscars at the 1946 18th Academy Awards:

- Film Editing – George Amy
- Original Music Score – Franz Waxman
- Best Story – Alvah Bessie

The film's screenwriter Lester Cole felt that Alvah Bessie did not deserve a film credit for the story, saying he only contributed some pages, and felt he and Ranald MacDougall should have had it instead. However, he decided not to challenge the credit because Bessie was a friend. However, Cole was further disappointed when Bessie earned an Oscar nomination.

== See also ==
- U-571 - a 2000 war film starring Matthew McConaughey that fictitiously depicts the US Navy capturing a German U-boat that was actually seized by the British Royal Navy.
