= Herta Ware =

American actress (1917–2005)

- Born: Herta Schwartz; June 9, 1917; Wilmington, Delaware, U.S.
- Died: August 15, 2005 (aged 88); Topanga, California, U.S.
- Occupation: Actress
- Years active: 1930s–? (stage); 1978–2000 (film & television)
- Spouses: Will Geer (m. 1934; div. 1954) David Marshall (m. 1954; div. 1978)
- Children: 4, including Ellen Geer
- Parent: Helen Ware
- Relatives: Willow Geer (granddaughter)

Herta Ware (June 9, 1917 – August 15, 2005) was an American actress and activist.

== Early life ==
Ware was born Herta Schwartz in Wilmington, Delaware. Her mother, Helen Ware, was a musician and violin teacher. Her father, Laszlo Schwartz, was an actor who was born in Budapest. Her father was Jewish and her mother was Christian.

Herta's maternal uncle, Harold Ware, headed the Ware Group, the most extensive Soviet spy ring in American history. Her maternal grandmother was labor organizer and socialist Ella Reeve Bloor, the co-founder of the Communist Labor Party of America, and later a member of the central committee of the Communist Party USA.

== Career ==
Ware made her Broadway debut in Let Freedom Ring (November 6, 1935–February 1936), co-starring husband Will Geer, whom she had married in 1934. The couple appeared together in other New York plays, including Bury the Dead (1936), Prelude (1936), 200 Were Chosen (1936) and Journeyman (1938), and Six O'Clock Theatre (1948), all of which were short-lived.

She made her on-screen debut in 1978, when she appeared in the television film, A Question of Guilt. Subsequently, she appeared in her first feature film 1980, The Black Marble. Her second feature film was Dr. Heckyl and Mr. Hype, which featured Oliver Reed. She starred in 2010 in 1984.

She is perhaps most recognized for her performance in the classic film Ron Howard's Cocoon, and appeared in the sequel Cocoon: The Return. She appeared in Critters 2: The Main Course as "Nana". She had roles in several other well-known films such as, Species, Practical Magic, with Sandra Bullock and Nicole Kidman, and Cruel Intentions, with Sarah Michelle Gellar and Ryan Phillippe. Her role in the 1992 television film Crazy in Love earned her a CableACE Award for Supporting Actress in a Movie or Miniseries.

Ware made many guest appearances on classic television series including, Knots Landing, Highway to Heaven, Cagney & Lacey, The Golden Girls and ER, to name a few.

Along with her daughter, Ellen Geer, she made guest appearances on Star Trek: The Next Generation and Beauty and the Beast.

== Personal life ==
In 1934, Ware married actor Will Geer, with whom she had three children. Together, they relocated to Los Angeles in the early 1940s and settled in Santa Monica so that Geer could pursue his movie career.

They were a politically minded couple and, in 1951, the passionately left-wing Geer was blacklisted by Hollywood for taking the Fifth Amendment and refusing to testify before the House Un-American Activities Committee.

With Geer's film career subsequently destroyed, the couple experienced financial difficulties and lost their Los Angeles home. The pair divorced in 1954 but remained close friends.

Ware later married actor David Marshall in 1954. Together they had one child, a daughter, actress Melora Marshall. The marriage ended in divorce.

Ware and Geer reunited in 1973 and subsequently co-founded the Will Geer Theatricum Botanicum, which was on five acres of land that Ware purchased in Topanga Canyon for $10,000. The burgeoning theater officially opened as a summer theater in 1973.

She stayed by Geer's bedside as he died of a respiratory ailment in 1978. In 2000, she published her own memoir Fantastic Journey, My Life with Will Geer.

== Death ==
Ware died on August 15, 2005, due to complications of Parkinson's disease, in Topanga, California. She was 88 years old. Her ashes and those of her ex-husband, Will Geer, were scattered at their outdoor theatre.

== Filmography ==
=== Film ===
Year	Title	Role	Directed by	Notes
1980	The Black Marble	The Grand Duchess	Harold Becker	
1980	Dr. Heckyl and Mr. Hype	Old Lady On Bus	Charles B. Griffith	
1984	2010	Jessie Bowman	Peter Hyams	
1985	Cocoon	Rosie Lefkowitz	Ron Howard	
1987	Slam Dance	Mrs. Raines	Wayne Wang	
1987	Promised Land	Mrs. Higgins	Michael Hoffman	
1987	Dirty Laundry	Grandmother Verna	William Webb	
1988	Critters 2: The Main Course	Nana	Mick Garris	
1988	Cocoon: The Return	Rose Lefkowitz	Daniel Petrie	
1988	Dakota	Aunt Zard	Fred Holmes	
1991	Soapdish	Old Woman	Michael Hoffman	
1991	Lonely Hearts	Gran	Andrew Lane	
1991	Race Against Tomorrow			
1995	Top Dog	Mrs. Wilder, Jake's Mother	Aaron Norris	
1995	Species	Mrs. Morris	Roger Donaldson	
1997	St. Patrick's Day	Aunt Delia	Hope Perello	
1998	Practical Magic	Old Lady Wilkes	Griffin Dunne	
1998	The Politics of Desire	The Radio Listener	Petrie Alexandra	
1999	Cruel Intentions	Mrs. Sugarman	Roger Kumble	
1999	Held Up	Alice	Steve Rash	
2000	Beautiful	Clara	Sally Field	
2000	Desperate But Not Serious	Grammy	Bill Fishman	(final film role)

=== Television ===
Year	Title	Role	Notes
1983	Knots Landing	Ethel Marcus	Season 5, episode 14 "Secrets Cry Aloud"
1984	Highway to Heaven	Grandma	Season 1, episode 13 "Another Song for Christmas"
1985	Wildside	Mrs. Brinkenhoff	Season 1, episode 1 "Well-Known Secret" (pilot)
1985	Scarecrow and Mrs. King		Season 3, episode 3 "Over the Limit"
1986	Crossings	Mrs. Emma Zimmerman	Television mini-series; episode 1
1986	Amazing Stories	Grandma Helen	Season 1, episode 24 "Grandpa's Ghost" (season finale)
1986	Sidekicks	Mamie	Season 1, episode 12 "Grey Belts"
1987	Crime Story	Old Lady	Season 1, episode 19 "The Pinnacle"
1987	Beauty and the Beast	Sylvia	Season 1, episode 3 "Siege"
1987	Star Trek: The Next Generation	Yvette Picard	Season 1, episode 6 "Where No One Has Gone Before"
1988	Cagney & Lacey	Wilma Milton	Season 7, episode 10 "Old Flames"
1988	The Golden Girls	Ida	Season 4, episode 8 "Brother, Can You Spare That Jacket?"
1989	Just the Ten of Us	Sister Cyril	Season 2, episode 10 "Song of Constance"
1990	The Munsters Today	The Widow Johansen	Season 2, episode 24 "That's Gratitude" (season finale)
1991	The New Adam-12	Claire	Season 1, episode 20 "221 Pizza"
1991	Eerie, Indiana	Mary B. Carter	Season 1, episode 8 "The Dead Letter"
1992	Civil Wars	Alma Gough	Season 2, episode 3 "Oboe Phobia"
1994	ER	Mrs. Franks	Season 1, episode 2 "Day One"
1995	Misery Loves Company	Old Hildy	Season 1, episode 5 "The Witches of East 6th" (unaired episode)
1996	Tracey Takes On...	Ida Levitz	Season 1, episode 6 "Law"
1998-2000	Beyond Belief: Fact or Fiction	Old Woman	Season 2, episode 9 (story 3 - "The Getaway"); Season 3, episode 3 ("The Find", "The Golden Cue", "The FBI Story", "The Gravedigger's Nemesis" & "Last Rites" - all 5 stories from #3.3)

=== Television films ===
Year	Title	Role	Notes
1978	A Question of Guilt	Miriam's Mother	
1986	Child's Cry	Mrs. Hartounian	
1990	Miracle Landing	Dorothy Hendricks	
1992	Crazy in Love	Pem	CableAce Award for Supporting Actress in a Movie or Miniseries
1996	Alien Nation: Millennium	Alana	
1996	Co-ed Call Girl	Customer	

=== Other appearances ===
- 1974 Medieval Theater: The Play of Abraham and Isaac ... Mary Pink, Mother (short documentary)
- 1984 Woody Guthrie: Hard Travelin' (documentary)
- 1993 When Jesus Was a Kid (video short)
