= Will Geer =

American actor (1902–1978)

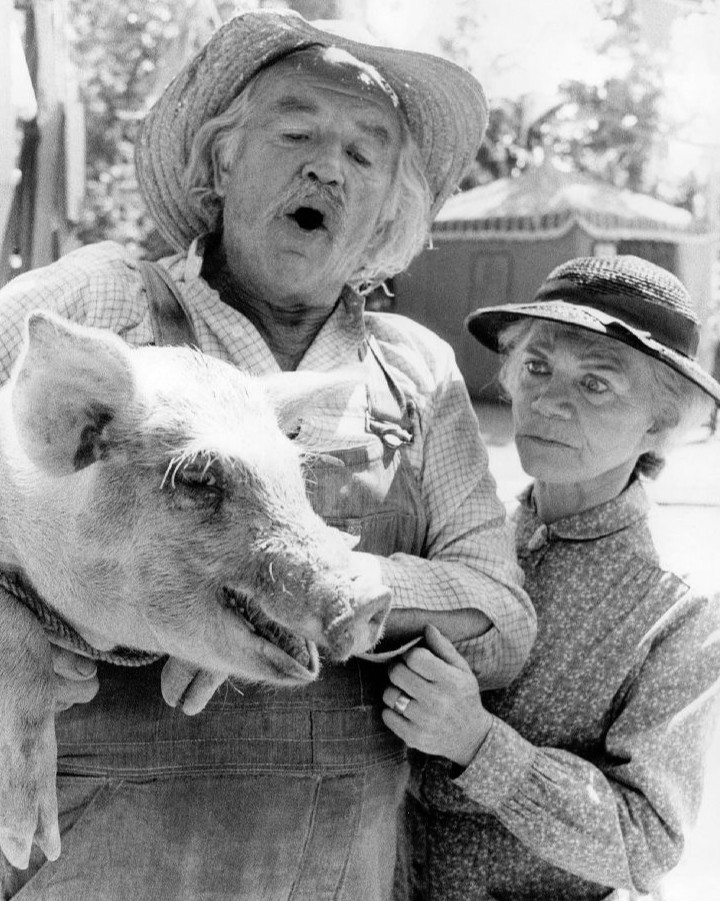
- Geer as Grandpa "Zeb" Walton (with Ellen Corby) in The Waltons
- Born: William Aughe Ghere; March 9, 1902; Frankfort, Indiana, U.S.
- Died: April 22, 1978 (aged 76); Los Angeles, California, U.S.
- Occupations: Actor; musician; social activist
- Years active: 1927–1978
- Spouse: Herta Ware (m. 1934; div. 1954)
- Partner: Harry Hay (1932–1934)
- Children: 3, including Ellen Geer
- Relatives: Willow Geer (granddaughter)

Will Geer (born William Aughe Ghere; March 9, 1902 – April 22, 1978) was an American actor, musician, and social activist who was active in labor organizing and communist movements in New York City and Southern California in the 1930s and 1940s. In California, he befriended rising singer Woody Guthrie. They both lived in New York City for a time in the 1940s. He was blacklisted in the 1950s by Hollywood after refusing, in testimony before Congress, to name persons who had joined the Communist Party USA.

In his later years, Geer was best known for his role as Grandpa Zebulon "Zeb" Walton in the TV series The Waltons from 1972 until his death in 1978.

== Early life ==
Geer was born in Frankfort, Indiana, the son of Katherine (née Aughe), a teacher, and Roy Aaron Ghere, a postal worker. His father left the family when he was 11 years old. Will was deeply influenced by his grandfather, who taught him the botanical names of the plants in Indiana, his native state. Will began to be a botanist; he received a master's degree in botany at the University of Chicago. He was also a member of the Lambda Chi Alpha fraternity.

== Career ==
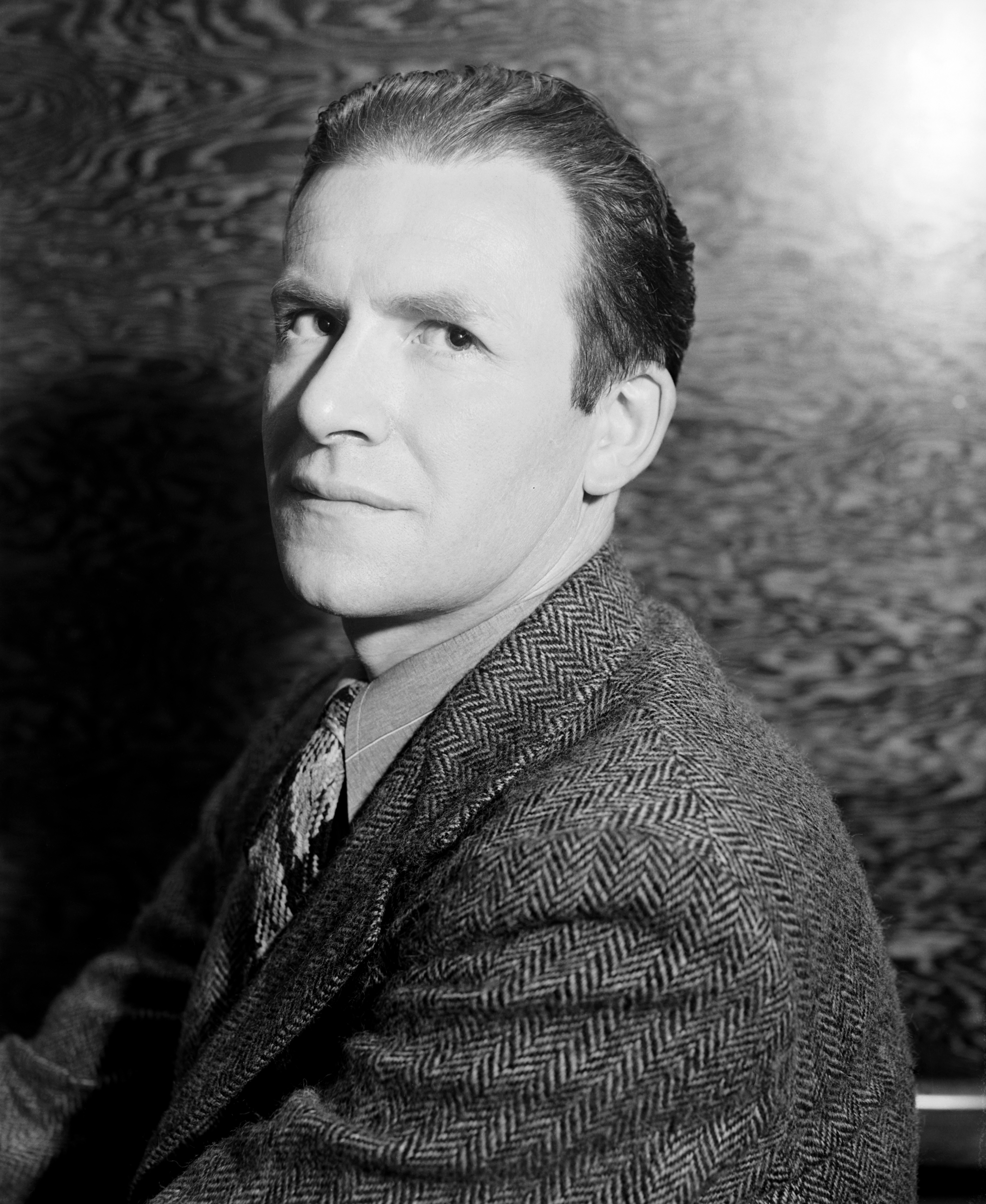
Geer created the role of Mr. Mister in the 1937 Federal Theatre Project production of The Cradle Will Rock.

Anglicizing his name, Will Geer began his acting career touring in tent shows and on riverboats. He worked on several social commentaries for documentaries, including narrating Sheldon Dick's Men and Dust about silicosis among miners. He portrayed John Kirkland in the 1935 Broadway production of Let Freedom Ring.

He created the role of Mr. Mister in Marc Blitzstein's 1937 The Cradle Will Rock, played Candy in John Steinbeck's theatrical adaptation of his novella Of Mice and Men and appeared in numerous plays and revues throughout the 1940s. From 1948 to 1951, he appeared in more than a dozen movies, including Winchester '73 (as Wyatt Earp), Broken Arrow, and Comanche Territory, all in 1950; as well as Bright Victory (1951).

During the 1930s, Geer became a dedicated activist touring government work camps of the Civilian Conservation Corps with folk singers like Burl Ives and Woody Guthrie, whom he introduced to the People's World and the Daily Worker. In 1956, Guthrie and Geer released an album together on Folkways Records, titled Bound for Glory: Songs and Stories of Woody Guthrie. In his biography, Harry Hay described Geer's activism and their activities while organizing for the strike. Geer introduced Guthrie to Pete Seeger at the 'Grapes of Wrath' benefit, which he organized in 1940 for migrant farm workers.

Geer acted with the Group Theatre (New York) studying under Harold Clurman, Cheryl Crawford, and Lee Strasberg. Geer acted in radio appearing as Mephistopheles (the devil) in the 1938 and 1944 productions of Norman Corwin's The Plot to Overthrow Christmas. Geer also acted in the radio soap opera Bright Horizon.

=== Blacklist ===
Geer was a Communist Party member since the 1930s and made "repeated appearances at fundraisers for the American Communist Party" over the years. Because of this, Geer was blacklisted in the early 1950s for refusing to testify before the House Committee on Un-American Activities. As a result, he appeared in very few films over the next decade. Among those was Salt of the Earth (1954). He starred in it; it was produced, directed, and written by blacklisted Hollywood personnel. It told the story of a miners' strike in New Mexico from a pro-union standpoint. The film was denounced as "subversive", consequently it faced difficulties during production and in distribution.

=== Later years ===
In 1951, Geer founded the Will Geer Theatricum Botanicum in Topanga, California, with his wife, actress Herta Ware. He combined his acting and botanical careers at the Theatricum, cultivating every plant mentioned in Shakespeare's plays. During the late 1950s and early 1960s, he played several seasons at the American Shakespeare Festival in Stratford, Connecticut. He created a second Shakespeare Garden on the theater's grounds. By that time, he was working sporadically again on Broadway.

In 1964, Geer was nominated for the Tony Award for Best Featured Actor in a Musical for 110 in the Shade. In 1967, he performed a soliloquy as the prosecutor delivering the closing argument against the two murderers in the film In Cold Blood. In 1972, he played the part of Bear Claw in the film Jeremiah Johnson.

In 1972, Geer was cast as Zebulon Walton, the family patriarch on the CBS television series The Waltons, a role he took over from Edgar Bergen, who had played the character in the TV movie the series was based on. Geer won an Emmy for Outstanding Supporting Actor in a Drama Series for The Waltons in 1975. When Geer died shortly after completing the sixth season of The Waltons, the death of his character was written into the show's script. His final episode, the last episode of the 1977–1978 season, showed him reuniting with his onscreen wife Esther (played by Ellen Corby; she had been absent for the entire season due to a stroke). His character was mourned onscreen during the first episode of the 1978–1979 season, titled "The Empty Nest".

== Personal life ==
In 1932, Geer met Harry Hay at the Tony Pastor Theatre where Geer was working as an actor. They soon became lovers. Geer and Hay participated in a milk strike in Los Angeles. Later in the year, they performed in support of the 1934 West Coast waterfront strike, where they witnessed police firing on strikers and killing two. Geer was a committed communist; Hay later described him as his political mentor. Geer introduced Hay to Los Angeles' communist community and together they were activists, joining demonstrations for laborers' rights and the unemployed. Once, they handcuffed themselves to lampposts outside UCLA and handed out leaflets for the American League Against War and Fascism. Geer became a member of the Communist Party of the United States in 1934. After Hay was increasingly political, Geer introduced him to the party. Geer became a reader of the People's World, a West Coast Communist newspaper.

Geer married actress Herta Ware in 1934; they had three children, Kate Geer, Thad Geer, and actress Ellen Geer. Ware also had a daughter, Melora Marshall, who was an actress, from another marriage. Although he and Ware divorced in 1954, they remained close for the rest of their lives.

He maintained a garden at his vacation house, called Geer-Gore Gardens, in Nichols, Connecticut. He was often there and attended the local Fourth of July fireworks celebrations, sometimes wearing a black top hat or straw hat and always his trademark denim overalls with only one suspender hooked. He had a small vacation house in Solana Beach, California, where his front and back yards were cultivated as vegetable gardens rather than lawns.

== Death ==
Geer died of respiratory failure at the age of 76 on April 22, 1978, in Los Angeles. As he was dying, his family sang folk songs that he and Woody Guthrie had written and recited poems by Robert Frost at his bedside. His remains were cremated, and his ashes are buried at the Theatricum Botanicum in the Shakespeare Garden in Topanga Canyon, California.

== TV and filmography ==
- Misleading Lady (1932) as McMahon – Asylum Guard
- Spitfire (1934) as West Fry
- Wild Gold (1934) as Poker Player (uncredited)
- The Mystery of Edwin Drood (1935) as Village Lamplighter (uncredited)
- Union Pacific (1939) as Foreman (uncredited)
- The Fight for Life (1940) as 2nd Teacher
- Deep Waters (1948) as Nick Driver
- The Chevrolet Tele-Theatre (1948) as Sam Hobbs
- Johnny Allegro (1949) as Schultzy
- Lust for Gold (1949) as Deputy Ray Covin
- Anna Lucasta (1949) as Noah
- Intruder in the Dust (1949) as Sheriff Hampton
- The Kid from Texas (1950) as O'Fallon
- Comanche Territory (1950) as Dan'l Seeger
- Winchester '73 (1950) as Wyatt Earp
- It's a Small World (1950) as William Musk – Father
- Broken Arrow (1950) as Ben Slade
- Convicted (1950) as Convict Mapes
- To Please a Lady (1950) as Jack Mackay
- Double Crossbones (1951) as Tom Botts
- Bright Victory (1951) as Mr. Lawrence Nevins
- The Tall Target (1951) as Homer Crowley – Train Conductor
- Racket Squad (1951) as Harry Robinson
- The Barefoot Mailman (1951) as Dan Paget – Miami Mayor / Postmaster
- Salt of the Earth (1954) as Sheriff
- Mobs, Inc. (1956) as Harry Robinson (archive footage)
- Advise and Consent (1962) as Senate Minority Leader
- East Side/West Side (1964) as Brian Lincoln
- Black Like Me (1964) as Truckdriver
- The Trials of O'Brien (1966) as Judge Lindemann / Sheldon
- Seconds (1966) as Old Man
- The Crucible (1967) as Giles
- Garrison's Gorillas (1967) as Laski
- In Cold Blood (1967) as Prosecutor
- The President's Analyst (1967) as Dr. Lee-Evans
- I Spy (1968) as Uncle Harry
- Run for Your Life (1968) as Judge David P. Andrews
- Of Mice and Men (1968) as Candy
- Mission: Impossible (1968) as Doc
- The Invaders (1968) as Hank Willis
- Bandolero! (1968) as Pop Chaney
- Gunsmoke (1968) as Slocum
- Certain Honorable Men (1968) as Malcolm Stoddard
- Mayberry R.F.D. (1969) as Captain Wolford
- Here Come the Brides (1969) as Benjamin Pruitt
- Bonanza (1969–1971) as Ferris Callahan / Zach Randolph / Calvin Butler
- Hawaii Five-O (1969) as Professor Harold Lochner
- Then Came Bronson (1969) as Oliver Hidemann
- Daniel Boone (1969) as Adam
- The Reivers (1969) as Boss McCaslin
- I Walk The Line (1970) (Grandpa Tawes voice dub)
- The Name of the Game (1970) as Mac
- The Moonshine War (1970) as Mr. Baylor
- The Brotherhood of the Bell (1970) as Mike Patterson
- Pieces of Dreams (1970) as The Bishop
- The Bold Ones: The Senator (1970–1971) as Elliot Leveridge / Judge Scanlon / Ralph Turner
- The Bill Cosby Show (1970) as Mr. Kane
- Medical Center (1970–1974) as Coughlin
- Shooting the Moonshine War (1970) as Himself (uncredited)
- The Bold Ones: The Lawyers (1970–1971) as Elliot Leveridge / Judge Scanlon / Ralph Turner
- Sam Hill: Who Killed Mr. Foster? (1971) as Simon Anderson
- Love, American Style (1971) as Desk Clerk (segment "Love and the Pulitzer Prize")
- Brother John (1971) as Doc Thomas
- Cade's County (1971) as Hurley Gaines
- Alias Smith and Jones (1971) as Seth
- O'Hara, U.S. Treasury (1971) as Singlefoot
- The Jimmy Stewart Show (1971) as Uncle Everett
- The Waltons (TV series) (1972–1978) as Zebulon Tyler Walton
- Dear Dead Delilah (1972) as Roy Jurroe
- The Scarecrow (1972) as Justice Gilead Merton
- Bewitched (1972) as President George Washington
- The Sixth Sense (TV series) (1972) as Rev. Jordan
- Jeremiah Johnson (1972) as Bear Claw
- The Rowdyman (1972) as Stan
- Napoleon and Samantha (1972) as Grandpa
- Night Gallery (1973) as Walt Peckinpah
- Columbo: "A Stitch in Crime" (1973) as Dr. Edmund Hidemann
- Brock's Last Case (1973) as J. Smiley Krenshaw
- Harry O (1973) as Len McNeil
- Savage (1973) as Joel Ryker
- The ABC Afternoon Playbreak (1973) as Ben
  - Episode: "A Gift of Terror"
- Kung Fu (1973) as Judge Emmitt Marcus
- Isn't It Shocking? (1973) as Lemuel Lovell
- Doc Elliot (1973) as Paul Bartlett
- Executive Action (1973) as Harold Ferguson
- The Hanged Man (1974) as Nameless
- Silence (1974) as Crazy Jack
- Honky Tonk (1974) as Judge Cotton
- Memory of Us (1974) as Motel Manager
- Hurricane (1974) as Dr. McCutcheon
- The Manchu Eagle Murder Caper Mystery (1975) as Dr. Simpson
- The Night That Panicked America (1975) as Reverend Davis
- The Blue Bird (1976) as Grandfather
- Law and Order (1976) as Pat Crowley
- Moving Violation (1976) as Rockfield
- Hollywood on Trial (1976) as Himself
- Starsky & Hutch (1976) as Commodore Atwater
- Hee Haw (1976) as Himself
- The Billion Dollar Hobo (1977) as Choo-Choo Trayne
- Eight Is Enough (1977) as Sam
- The Love Boat (1977) as Franklyn Bootherstone
- Unknown Powers (1978) as Host
- CBS: On the Air (1978)
- The Mafu Cage (1978) as Zom (posthumous release)
- A Woman Called Moses (1978) as Thomas Garrett (final role, posthumous release)

== Discography ==
- Folkways: The Original Vision (2005) Smithsonian Folkways
- Ecology Won: Readings by Will Geer and Ellen Geer (1978) Folkways Records
- Woody's Story: As Told by Will Geer and Sung by Dick Wingfield (1976) Folkways Records
- American History in Ballad and Song, Vol.2 (1962) Folkways Records
- Mark Twain: Readings from the Stories and from "Huckleberry Finn" (1961) Folkways Records
- Hootenanny at Carnegie Hall (1960) Folkways Records
- Bound for Glory: Songs and Stories of Woody Guthrie (1956) Folkways Records
