= J. E. Freeman =

American actor

- Freeman in Patriot Games (1992)
- Born: James E. Freeman; February 2, 1946; New York City, New York, U.S.
- Died: August 9, 2014 (aged 68); San Francisco, California, U.S.
- Education: Shelton Studios
- Occupation: Actor
- Years active: 1979–2007

James E. Freeman (February 2, 1946 – August 9, 2014) was an American actor. He was known to film audiences for his portrayals of intimidating villains, like Marcelles Santos in David Lynch's Wild at Heart (1990), Eddie Dane in the Coen brothers' Miller's Crossing (1990), and Dr. Wren in Alien Resurrection (1997).

== Early life ==
Freeman was born in Brooklyn, New York in 1946. He attended Bishop Loughlin Memorial High School, where he was a three-year member of the track team. He graduated from Bishop Loughlin in 1964. As a high school student, he was assertively conservative.

Out of high school, Freeman enlisted in the United States Marine Corps. At age 22, he revealed his sexuality to the Marine Corps, leading to his discharge. He moved to San Francisco, where trained as an actor at Shelton Studios in the 1970s.

== Career ==
Freeman was nominated for best actor for playing Teach in the West Coast premiere of David Mamet's American Buffalo. His other stage credits included Marsha Norman's Getting Out for the Portland Stage Company in 1982, and a stint at the Actors Theatre of Louisville in 1983.

His first feature film appearance was in the Chuck Norris action movie An Eye for an Eye (1981), playing a tow-truck driver. During the decade, he played guest spots on various television series like Hill Street Blues and MacGyver. His breakout performance was as Marcelles Santos, a ruthless gangster, in David Lynch's Wild at Heart (1990). That same year, he was subsequently cast as intimidating mob henchman Eddie Dane in the Coens' Miller's Crossing (1990).

Other notable films in which he played include Ruthless People (1986) as the "Bedroom Killer", Patriot Games (1992) as CIA agent Marty Cantor, Dr. Mason Wren in Alien Resurrection (1997), Copycat (1995) as police lieutenant Thomas Quinn, and Go (1998) as strip-club owner Vic Sr.

== Personal life ==
Freeman was gay. He had been HIV-positive since around 1984. In 2009, he published a letter to the editor on SFGate, describing his reminiscences of the 1969 Stonewall riots.

He retired from acting in 2007. Freeman wrote poetry and had a Tumblr blog ("Freedapoet") dedicated to his work.

=== Death ===
Freeman died in the evening of August 9, 2014. He was 68.

== Filmography ==
- 1981: An Eye for an Eye – Tow Truck Dude
- 1983: Twice Upon a Time – Rusher of Din – Pool Player
- 1986: Stingray (1x01 – Ancient Eyes)
- 1986: Ruthless People – The Bedroom Killer
- 1986: Hard Traveling – Ed Sloan
- 1988: Terrorist on Trial: The United States vs. Salim Ajami (TV movie) – Agent Peter Nello
- 1988: The Couch Trip – Unger
- 1990: Wild at Heart – Marcelles Santos
- 1990: Miller's Crossing – Eddie Dane
- 1991: One Good Cop – Captain Schreiber
- 1991: The Doctor – Ralph
- 1991: Aces: Iron Eagle III – Ames
- 1992: Memphis (TV movie) – Podjo Harris
- 1992: Patriot Games – Marty Cantor
- 1992: Highlander: The Series – Joe Scanlon (1x02 – Family Tree)
- 1993: Casualties of Love: The Long Island Lolita Story – Marty Algar
- 1993: Mother's Boys – Everett, Principal
- 1994: It Could Happen to You – Sal Bontempo
- 1994: There Goes My Baby – George
- 1995: Copycat – Thomas Quinn
- 1997: Dream with the Fishes – Joe, Nick's father
- 1997: Alien Resurrection – Dr. Mason Wren
- 1997: The Man Who Knew Too Little – CIA Man
- 1998: Dance with Me – (uncredited)
- 1998: Fool's Gold – George
- 1999: Go – Victor Sr.
- 2000: Auggie Rose – Pawn Shop Owner
- 2000: Skeleton Woman – Luigi
- 2000: Along for the Ride – Jake Cowens
- 2001: Suspended Animation – Philip Boulette
- 2003: Carolina – Wrecking Yard Owner
- 2003: 44 Minutes: The North Hollywood Shoot-Out (TV movie) – Police commander
- 2003: Mystery Woman (TV movie) – Ian Philby
- 2004: Tremors 4: The Legend Begins (Video) – Old Fred
