= Willow Geer =

American actress (born 1981)

- Born: March 2, 1981 (age 45); Los Angeles, California, U.S.
- Other name: Willow Geer-Alsop
- Occupation: Actress
- Years active: 1999–present
- Parent(s): Ellen Geer; Peter Alsop
- Relatives: Will Geer (maternal grandfather); Herta Ware (maternal grandmother)

Willow Geer (born March 2, 1981) is an American actress.

Geer was born in Los Angeles. She is a third-generation actor/actress, the daughter of actress Ellen Geer and children's musician Peter Alsop and the granddaughter of actor Will Geer (best known for his role in The Waltons as Grandpa Walton).

She worked as voice actress in the console Survival game Lost Odyssey and in the animated film Teenage Mutant Ninja Turtles.

== Filmography ==
Film and television
Year	Title	Role	Notes
1999	After Romeo	Julie	
2003	Angel	Glass Woman	Episode: "Hell Bound"
2005	Briar & Graves	Quaker Woman	TV movie
2007	TMNT	Background Voices (Wallah)	Voice
2007	Avenging Angel	Saloon Girl	TV movie
2007	Walk Hard: The Dewey Cox Story	Rehab Nurse	
2008	Backwoods	Gwen	TV movie
2009	ER	Andromeda	Episode: "The Beginning of the End"
2009	Hawthorne	Nurse Angela	Episode: "Healing Time"
2010	Amish Grace	Judith	TV movie
2011	Shameless	Miss Devlin	Episode: "Killer Carl"
2011	Love's Everlasting Courage	Sarah	TV movie
2011	Law & Order: LA	Laurie	Episode: "Plummer Park"
2011	Days of Our Lives	Charity	Episode: "1.11644"
2012	Justified	J.J. Corliss	Episode: "When the Guns Come Out"
2012	Victorious	Marlene	Episode: "Car, Rain & Fire"
2016	Finding Dory	Additional Voices	Voice
