= The Jimmy Stewart Show =

American television series 1971-1972

- Created by: Hal Kanter
- Starring: Jimmy Stewart; Julie Adams; Jonathan Daly; Ellen Geer; Dennis Larson; Kirby Furlong; John McGiver
- Theme music composer: Jeff Alexander
- Composer: Jeff Alexander
- Country of origin: United States
- No. of seasons: 1
- No. of episodes: 24

Production
- Producers: Hal Kanter; Bernard Wiesen
- Camera setup: Single-camera
- Running time: 25 minutes
- Production companies: J-K/Ablidon Productions; Warner Bros. Television

Original release
- Network: NBC
- Release: September 19, 1971 – March 12, 1972

A publicity photo of cast members of The Jimmy Stewart Show: Back row, left to right: Ellen Geer, Jonathan Daly and Kirby Furlong. Front row, left to right: Julie Adams, Dennis Larson, and James Stewart.

The Jimmy Stewart Show is an American sitcom starring James Stewart as a college professor in a small town who shares his home with three generations of his family. Twenty-four episodes of the show were broadcast during the 1971–72 season on NBC.

== Synopsis ==
Dr. James K. Howard, known as Jim, is an anthropology professor at Josiah Kessel College, the small-town institution of higher learning founded by his grandfather Josiah Kessel in the fictional town of Easy Valley in Northern California. Jim — whose middle name is Kessel — lives with his wife of 30 years, Martha, and their eight-year-old son Teddy. Jim also has a 29-year-old son, Peter J. Howard, Sr., known as "P.J.," who owns the Easy Valley Construction Company, where his pretty and perky wife Wendy assists him. P.J. and Wendy also have an eight-year-old son, Peter J. "Jake" Howard, Jr., who is Teddy's nephew but finds it strange to refer to Teddy as his uncle; the two boys often bicker over what to call one another and who should show greater respect to whom. Jim's easygoing life becomes complicated when he inadvertently burns down P.J. and Wendy's house and he and Martha invite P.J., Wendy, and Jake to move in with them temporarily. Jim is good-natured, and the two families do the best they can to get along in the overcrowded house, but conflicts are inevitable.

Dr. Luther Quince, a Nobel Prize-winning chemistry professor, is a faculty colleague of Jim's at the college and quite a contrast to Jim — Luther drives a Rolls-Royce while Jim rides a bicycle to class, and Luther thinks of himself as having refined tastes, while Jim plays the accordion. Nonetheless, the two men are good friends. One of Martha's projects is a portrait of Luther, which she has been painting for a long time but never seems to finish. Woodrow Yamada is the Howards' talkative milkman.

In the show's opening credits, Stewart (as Professor Howard) bicycles through the community. Stewart speaks directly to the camera and out of character at the beginning of each episode, introducing himself as "Jim Stewart" and telling the audience the title of the episode. At the end of each episode, he again speaks to the viewers, expressing the hope that they will return for the following week's show and wishing them "peace and love and laughter". In some episodes, he speaks to the viewers at other times as well, in character as Jim Howard, with any other actors in the scene behaving as if Jim is talking to himself.

Episodes occasionally include flashbacks depicting Jim Howard's grandfather, Josiah Kessel. In these flashbacks, Stewart portrays Kessel and Stewart's real-life wife, Gloria Stewart, plays Kessel's wife.

== Cast ==
- Jimmy Stewart as Professor James K. Howard and Josiah Kessel
- Julie Adams as Martha Howard
- Jonathan Daly as Peter J. "P.J." Howard, Sr.
- Ellen Geer as Wendy Howard
- Dennis Larson as Teddy Howard
- Kirby Furlong as Peter J. "Jake" Howard, Jr.
- John McGiver as Dr. Luther Quince
- Jack Soo as Woodrow Yamada

== Production ==
The show is notable as the only television or film production in which Stewart allowed himself to be billed on-screen as "Jimmy". In all of his movies, he was billed as "James Stewart".

The Jimmy Stewart Show had no laugh track. Procter & Gamble sponsored the show.

In the episode "The Identity Crisis," Beulah Bondi portrayed James Stewart's mother. She also played his mother in four films: It's a Wonderful Life, Mr. Smith Goes to Washington, Of Human Hearts, and Vivacious Lady.

According to series producer Hal Kanter, Stewart objected to a scene where African American actor Hal Williams played a police officer who would "lash out" at Stewart's character. Kanter claimed Stewart did not like the idea of an African American police officer "lecturing him" and threatened to dismiss Williams. However, once Kanter explained that Williams was to play an FBI agent in a different episode, Stewart felt "chagrined" by the mistake. However, historian Shannon Allen disputes Kanter's account, noting that no FBI agent ever appeared on The Jimmy Stewart Show, that Williams does play a police officer in Episode 6, and the two interactions that Stewart has with white police officers on the show do not fit Kanter's description of the scene.

== Reception ==
The show fared poorly critically, was also a ratings disappointment, and was cancelled after only one season. It finished 44th out of 78 shows that season with a 17.7 rating.

== Broadcast history ==
The Jimmy Stewart Show premiered on September 19, 1971. Its 24th and last original episode was broadcast on March 12, 1972. Reruns of the show then aired in its regular time slot until August 27, 1972. It was broadcast on NBC on Sundays from 8:30 to 9:00 p.m. Eastern Time throughout its run.

== Episodes ==
No.	Title	Original release date
1	"By Way of Introduction"	September 19, 1971
The pilot episode for the series. While Jim is babysitting his grandson Jake and grading papers at P.J. and Wendy's house, he falls asleep with a lit cigar, causing a fire that destroys the house. Jim and Martha invite P.J., Wendy, and Jake to move in with them temporarily, but P.J. is reluctant to accept the offer.
2	"Love in a Briefcase"	September 26, 1971
Jim's briefcase was destroyed in the fire at P.J.and Wendy's house. He does not want a new one, but his family and friends insist that a man of his academic stature should have a briefcase — but fail to coordinate with one another on buying one. As a thank you to him for letting P.J., Wendy, and Jake move into his house, Wendy wants to buy him a new one, but P.J. opposes the idea. Meanwhile, Luther also decides to buy Jim a new briefcase. Jim ends up with multiple new ones, and the comedy of errors shows him how much he is loved by his family and friends.
3	"The Price of Plumbing Is Numbing"	October 3, 1971
Jim and Martha's house has only one-and-a-half bathrooms, and the lack of a second full bathroom leaves Jim waiting too long for bathroom time each morning with three additional people now competing with him for it. This makes it hard for him to shave before heading to the college for the day, and his annoyance at the situation causes a breach between P.J.'s family and him, so Jim and Martha decide to add a second full bathroom — and are shocked at how much it will cost.
4	"The Father and Son Game"	October 10, 1971
After P.J. and Jake make plans to play in the Booster Club's father-and-son baseball game, Teddy decides that he wants to play, too. But Teddy is clumsy and has no talent for baseball, and Jim faces a challenge in trying to find a way to include him in the game.
5	"Another Day, Another Scholar"	October 17, 1971
A sexy female student begins to stalk Jim. When she arrives at his office and begins to flirt with him, he flees, and his colleague Luther is left with the task of getting her to leave the office and leave Jim alone. After rumors spread around campus about Jim and the student, the student visits Martha, and Martha learns that she is not pursuing Jim after all, and merely wants to charm her way into his class. Meanwhile, Teddy is invited to attend a girl's party, and does not want to go.
6	"A Hunch in Time"	October 24, 1971
P.J. is excited by a potential land deal proposed by grandiose developer Harris Crofton, and the family tries to help make a good impression on Crofton. But the ecology-minded Jim thinks that something is not quite right about the deal. Meanwhile, Jake tries to get out of going to school.
7	"The Identity Crisis"	October 31, 1971
Feeling restless, Jim goes on a trip with Luther for an age-defying spree in San Francisco — but Jim's mother resides in San Francisco and leads an elegant life there, and the trip just leads to more trouble for Jim.
8	"Guest of Honor"	November 7, 1971
A visiting professor from behind the Iron Curtain stays at the Howard home and takes pleasure in the hectic nature of life there. He also confronts the Howards over American customs — such as arguing with a police officer.
9	"Pro Bono Publico"	November 14, 1971
P.J. and the Booster Club hope to get a big company to build a factory on a prime piece of real estate in Easy Valley, but Jim confronts the Boosters over their plan because the town hopes to build a community recreation area on the land. Taking some advice from Jim, Peter sets out to convince the company that Easy Valley nonetheless is the best place to locate its factory.
10	"A Bunk for Unc"	November 21, 1971
Jim's cheerful, lively, hard-driving, world-traveling Uncle Everett comes for a visit, annoying Jim by taking over the household and disrupting Jim's easy-going lifetsyle — and Uncle Everett shows no signs of leaving. Meanwhile, the Women's Action Group puts Wendy in charge of finding a location for a daycare center for the children of working mothers.
11	"A Run for City Commissioner" "A Vote for Howard"	November 28, 1971
Martha and P.J. run against one another for city commissioner, with the Women's Action Group backing Martha, the mayor's office supporting P.J., and Jim caught in the middle. A minority third candidate enters the race and Martha hopes he wins, but the candidate behaves strangely by never showing up at any of the political events.
12	"Period of Readjustment"	December 5, 1971
P.J. decides that his family should have its own home. His decision upsets the Howard household, and as Wendy tries to protect Jim from an aggressive saleswoman, Jim tells the story of how P.J., Wendy, and Jake ended up moving into his house.
13	"Luther's Last Love"	December 19, 1971
Luther is perfectly happy to be a bachelor, but much to his dismay, Martha and Wendy decide to play matchmaker for him. After they set up him with a blind date, he hatches a counterplot intended to discourage further matchmaking by pretending to become engaged to a strange, hip-swaying, gum-chewing woman.
14	"Cock-a-doodle Don't"	December 26, 1971
A rooster terrorizes the Howard family, leading to problems between Martha and Wendy. In a series of flashbacks, the two Howard families remember how they overcame the problems of all living together in Jim and Martha's house.
15	"As the Escrow Flies"	January 2, 1972
P.J. and Wendy drop their plans to rebuild their house when they see another house for sale that is move-in ready. After Wendy tells them that she and P.J. bought the house, Martha and Jim try to be happy for them but realize they do not really want P.J., Wendy, and Jake to move out and would be lonely without them. P.J. and Wendy wonder if they made the right decision, but Luther comes up with a solution he thinks will make everyone happy.
16	"Eighty-Nine Pounds of Love"	January 9, 1972
Jake's teacher calls him a dunce in front of the class, and even though the teacher apologizes, the other children tease him and make him feel like a loser. Jake feels better after he brings home a lovable stray dog, but the 89-pound (40.4 kg) dog is so big that it threatens to take over the house. Concerned that the troublesome dog's real owners may show up to reclaim it, the Howards wonder about how to get rid of it without breaking Jake's heart.
17	"The Quarterback Ache"	January 16, 1972
The big homecoming football game against Josiah Kessel College′s archrival, Cobb, is coming up, but the football team's doctor says that Josiah Kessel's star quarterback, Karpopolis, cannot play unless he loses 10 pounds (4.5 kg). Luther has bet on Josiah Kessel to win, so he sets out to ensure that Karpopolis loses the weight — with the help of Foodaholics Anonymous and everyone on campus.
18	"Aunt's in My Plans" "Aunt's in My Pants"	January 23, 1972
Martha's charming Aunt Lydia comes to visit, and Luther finds himself falling for her.
19	"Paper Work"	January 30, 1972
While learning about ecology at school, Jake and Teddy participate in a school paper recycling drive, and Jim drives them to the paper collection site with a station wagon full of paper. Then they discover that they accidentally donated 33 of Luther's ungraded exam books to the paper drive, and the Howards and some volunteers desperately search the recycling plant for the exams before the papers get shredded.
20	"Song of the Jailbird"	February 6, 1972
When the police begin a crackdown on erotic dancing, P.J. is arrested in a raid at a topless bar while he is eating with the Builders Association. After the raid, some students at the college ask Luther to chaperone a bachelor party they are having for a friend and ensure that it remains dignified, and they invite Jim to play his accordion at the party. It turns out to be a prank, the party is a stag party after all, and Jim winds up playing the accordion for a fan dancer. The police raid the party and arrest Jim, who refuses to post bail and pledges to fight the charges on the grounds that he has done nothing wrong.
21	"Price Is Right"	February 13, 1972
After Martha finally completes her portrait of Luther, she plans to show it at the Easy Valley Festival of Art. The festival hits a snag when its usual judge is unavailable, but actor and art connoisseur Vincent Price arrives seeking to add the college's painting of Josiah Kessel to his art collection, and his friend Jim drafts him into assuming the judging duties. Meanwhile, Jake and Teddy experiment with various ways to make some money.
22	"Jim's Decision"	February 20, 1972
Jim becomes a celebrity when he appears on an educational television show to discuss his latest anthropology book and then makes an appearance as a guest on Johnny Crown's late-night talk show. The publicity leads to increased sales of his book and prompts the University of Southern California to offer him a lucrative job. He accepts the job, but then wonders what his grandfather Josiah Kessel, who founded Josiah Kessel College, would have thought of his decision.
23	"Old School Ties"	March 5, 1972
Josiah Kessel College is raising money to fund the construction of a new field house which P.J. will build, and several Josiah Kessel alumni visit for the fund drive. Among them is Claude Peebles, who faced ridicule for losing a big football game years earlier but shows up with a check for $10,000. When Martha's old college boyfriend — the boastful and shameless Mike Carruthers, who now has a wealthy wife, Lucy — pledges to donate the entire (and substantial) remaining amount needed to build the field house, Peebles's check is deemed unnecessary. But the Carrutherses annoy Jim, and Jim's annoyance jeopardizes their donation. Guest stars: Arthur O'Connell, William Windom, Gloria DeHaven, Jack Collins, Lomax Study, and Beverly Carter.
24	"A Bone of Much Contention"	March 12, 1972
After a rare fossil is found in Easy Valley, Admiral Decker — the flamboyant and egotistical founder of a fast-food restaurant chain — announces plans to build a restaurant on the site. P.J. favors construction of the restaurant and Decker hires him to build it, but Jim wants the location preserved as a historical site.

== Home release ==
On January 21, 2014, Warner Home Video released The Jimmy Stewart Show: The Complete Series on DVD in Region 1, via their Warner Archive Collection. This is a manufacture-on-demand (MOD) release, available via WBShop.com and Amazon.com.
