= Ellen Geer =

American actress and director

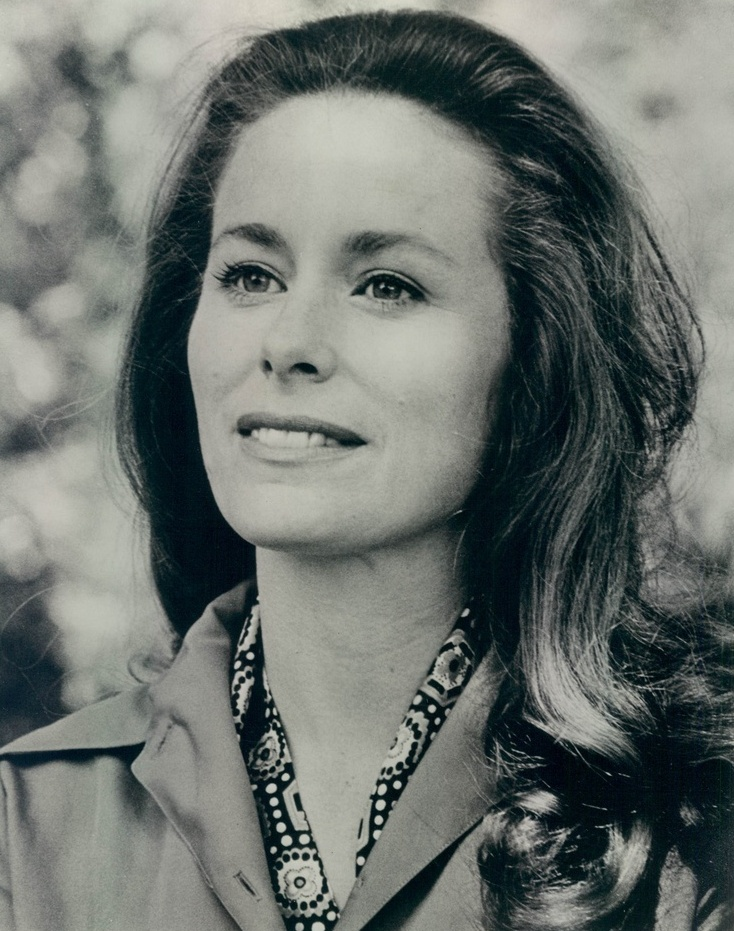
- Geer in 1975
- Born: Ellen Ware Geer; 1941 or 1942 (age 84–85); New York City, U.S.
- Occupations: Actress, theatre director, professor
- Years active: 1961–present
- Spouse(s): Ed Flanders (m. 1963; div. 1968) Peter Alsop (m. 1975)
- Children: 3, including Willow Geer
- Parents: Herta Ware; Will Geer

Ellen Geer (born 1941 or 1942) is an American actress, theatre director, and professor. She is the daughter of actors Will Geer and Herta Ware, and she spent much of her childhood in Topanga Canyon after her father was blacklisted during the McCarthy era. Since 1978, she has been the artistic director of the Will Geer Theatricum Botanicum, an open-air repertory theatre in Topanga Canyon that her father founded.

Geer's acting career began in the early 1960s. In 1963, she joined the company that opened the Tyrone Guthrie Theatre in Minneapolis. She made her film debut as a nun in Petulia (1968), and went on to appear in The Reivers, Kotch and Harold and Maude. Her later films include Patriot Games, Clear and Present Danger and Practical Magic. On television, she was a regular on The Jimmy Stewart Show and had recurring roles on Falcon Crest and Beauty and the Beast. She also taught acting at the UCLA School of Theater for twelve years.

== Early life and education ==
Ellen Geer was born in New York City. Her parents, Herta Ware and Will Geer, were both actors. Her father was best known for playing Grandpa Zebulon "Zeb" Walton on the 1970s television series The Waltons. Ellen was the oldest daughter in the family. Her brother Thad Geer and her half-sister Melora Marshall also became actors.

The family later settled in Santa Monica, California, where they lived comfortably in a large house. That changed during the McCarthy era, when Ellen was about ten years old. Her father was called before the House Un-American Activities Committee. He refused to testify, and he was blacklisted and could no longer find film work. With money running short, the family gave up the Santa Monica house and moved to a small, cheap plot of land in Topanga Canyon in the Santa Monica Mountains.

Life in the canyon was simple. The family got its water from a well, kept chickens, and grew much of its own food. Geer later said that her father "was a survivalist." Their home, known as Geer Gardens, became a refuge for other actors, writers and folk singers who had lost work because of the blacklist. As a child, Geer grew up around artists such as Woody Guthrie and Burgess Meredith. Her schooling was often disrupted. She later remembered going to 14 or 15 different schools, and said she was picked on at many of them and called a "Little Commie".

Geer trained for the stage at the American Shakespeare Academy, and she studied acting with John Houseman, Morris Carnovsky and Phoebe Brand, among others. She has said she also learned a great deal by watching the actors and directors she worked with early in her career, including Tyrone Guthrie, Douglas Campbell, Ellis Rabb and Rosemary Harris.

== Career ==
In 1963, Geer joined the Minnesota Theatre Company for the opening seasons of the original Tyrone Guthrie Theatre in Minneapolis, where, among other roles, she played the lead in Douglas Campbell’s production of Bernard Shaw's Saint Joan.

Geer began her film career appearing as a nun in the 1968 Richard Lester drama Petulia. She followed this with an appearance in 1969's The Reivers with her father, Will Geer.

In 1971, Geer played the deceased wife of the lead character in Kotch, appearing throughout the movie in flashbacks. That same year, she became a regular on The Jimmy Stewart Show (which aired until the following year) and had a supporting role in the acclaimed comedy Harold and Maude. In 1974, she starred in two films which she also wrote: Silence and Memory of Us, both of which featured her father.

The remainder of Geer's 1970s career consisted primarily of guest appearances and made-for-television movies. Television series on which she appeared during this time included Police Story, The Streets of San Francisco, Baretta, Barnaby Jones, Charlie's Angels, CHiPs, and two episodes of Fantasy Island.

Her television movie credits during this time included Babe (1975), The Lindbergh Kidnapping Case (1976), The Trial of Lee Harvey Oswald (1977), and A Shining Season (1979). The only theatrical film on which she worked in the late 1970s was Jonathan Kaplan's Over the Edge in 1979.

The remainder of her television credits include guest appearances in the Star Trek: The Next Generation episode "Silicon Avatar"; The Waltons; Quincy, M.E.; Dallas; Supernatural; The Practice; Stingray; CSI: Crime Scene Investigation; ER; NYPD Blue and Cold Case. She also had recurring roles on Falcon Crest and Beauty and the Beast. She played elderly Piper Halliwell on the WB series Charmed in the series finale. In October 2007, the actress returned briefly to Desperate Housewives, in which she briefly appeared before. She appeared in the fourth season of Castle in the episode called "The Blue Butterfly".

Geer has served since 1978 as artistic director of the Will Geer Theatricum Botanicum, a professional repertory, open-air theater in Topanga Canyon, California. She performed as Olivia in the Theatricum Botanicum's 1978 stage production of William Shakespeare's Twelfth Night.

Geer served as a visiting associate professor, teaching acting, at the University of California, Los Angeles School of Theater for 12 years.

== Filmography ==
=== Film ===
Year	Title	Role	Notes
1968	Petulia	Nun	
1969	The Reivers	Sally	
1971	Kotch	Vera Kotcher	
1971	Harold and Maude	Sunshine Doré	
1974	Silence	Barbara	
1974	The Memory of Us	Betty	
1979	Over the Edge	Sandra Willat	
1980	On the Nickel	Louise	
1981	Bloody Birthday	Madge	
1983	Heart Like a Wheel	Marianne Kalitta	
1983	Something Wicked This Way Comes	Mrs. Halloway	
1985	Creator	Mrs. Spencer	
1986	Hard Traveling	Norah Sloan	
1987	The Wild Pair	Fern Willis	
1987	Big Shots	Bar Waitress	
1989	Satan's Princess	Mary Kulik	
1991	Lonely Hearts	Martha	
1992	Patriot Games	Rose	
1993	Midnight Witness	Valerie	
1994	Clear and Present Danger	Rose	
1996	Phenomenon	Bonnie	
1998	Practical Magic	Pharmacist	
1998	The Odd Couple II	Frances Unger Melnick	
2005	Me and You and Everyone We Know	Ellen	
2006	The Visitation	Mrs. Macon	
2006	The Gold Bracelet	Miss Hanson	
2007	Man in the Chair	Mrs. Erskine	
2012	The Misadventures of the Dunderheads	Vernice	
2014	House at the End of the Drive	Eunice Sequoia	
2018	Unlovable	Nana	

=== Television ===
Year	Title	Role	Notes
1961	Play of the Week	Susan	Episode: "The Wooden Dish"
1970	The Name of the Game	Sally Henderson	Episode: "The King of Denmark"
1971–1972	The Jimmy Stewart Show	Wendy Howard	Regular role
1972	Ghost Story	Marian	Episode: "Bad Connection"
1972, 1980	The Waltons	Eva Mann, Ronie Cotter	Episodes: "The Ceremony", "The Pledge"
1973	Medical Center	Rose Sachs	Episode: "No Margin for Error"
1973	The New Perry Mason	Maria Findley	Episode: "The Case of the Deadly Deeds"
1974, 1980–1982	Insight	Mary Louise, Sally Carlin, Cathy, Iris	Episodes: "Eddie", "God in the Dock", "A Decision to Love", "A Gun for Mandy"
1975	Archer	Marsha	Episode: "The Arsonist"
1975	Babe	Lilly Didrikson	TV film
1975, 1979	Barnaby Jones	Mary Wiley, Ruth Parks	Episodes: "Beware the Dog", "Man on Fire"
1976	Police Story	Jenny Benson	Episode: "The Other Side of the Fence"
1976	The Lindbergh Kidnapping Case	Myra Condon	TV film
1976	Delvecchio	Edie Parker	Episode: "The Silent Prey"
1976	The Bionic Woman	Sister Barbara	Episode: "Sister Jaime"
1977	The Streets of San Francisco	Betty Rollins	Episode: "Who Killed Helen French?"
1977	Westside Medical	Susan MacAllister	Episode: "Pressure Cook"
1977	Baretta	Susan Foster	Episode: "Buddy"
1977	The Trial of Lee Harvey Oswald		TV film
1978	Night Cries	Mrs. Whitney	TV film
1978, 1980, 1982	CHiPs	Martha, Margo Adams, Julie Barris, Mrs. Williams	Episodes: "Vintage '54", "E.M.T.", "The Great 5K Star Race & Boulder Wrap Party", "Return to Death's Door"
1978, 1979	Fantasy Island	Doris Greer, Sylvia	Episodes: "Carnival", "Nobody's There"
1979	Charlie's Angels	Hutton	Episode: "Caged Angel"
1979	Paris	Marie Castle	Episode: "Burnout"
1979	A Shining Season	Veta Mercer	TV film
1979, 1989	Dallas	Anita Krane, Mrs. Bouleris	Episodes: "John Ewing III: Parts 1 & 2", "Hell's Fury"
1980	My Kidnapper, My Love	Paula Stanley	TV film
1981	Dynasty	Charlotte	Episode: "Oil: Part 1"
1981	The Princess and the Cabbie	Nellie	TV film
1981	Strike Force	Mrs. Wilcox	Episode: "Magic Man"
1982	Code Red	Mrs. Meyers	Episode: "No Escape"
1982	Quincy, M.E.	Dr. Solomon, Sarah Markham	Episodes: "For Love of Joshua", "Ghost of a Chance"
1982	Trapper John, M.D.	Roberta	Episode: "You Pays Your Money"
1983	Deadly Lessons	Mrs. Grant	TV film
1983	Voyagers!	Eleanor Roosevelt	Episode: "Destiny's Choice"
1983	I Want to Live	Mrs. Cooley	TV film
1983	Tales of the Unexpected	Stella Archer	Episode: "Youth from Vienna"
1984	Call to Glory	Natalie	Episode: "Call It Courage"
1984	Buchanan High	Mrs. Dolen	Episode: "The Loyal Opposition"
1985	Stingray	Sybil Rosenberg	TV film
1985	Too Close for Comfort	Loraine Dockery	Episode: "The British Are Coming, the British Are Coming"
1985–1987	Falcon Crest	Doris	Recurring role (seasons 5–6)
1986	Hunter	Mrs. Dudleigh	Episode: "Scrap Metal"
1986	Moonlighting	Amy Everette	Episode: "Witness for the Execution"
1986, 1990	Santa Barbara	Dorothy, Norma Flannery	Episodes: "1.470", "1.1603"
1988	The Town Bully	Bea King	TV film
1988–1990	Beauty and the Beast	Mary	Recurring role
1991	Star Trek: The Next Generation	Kila Marr	Episode: "Silicon Avatar"
1993	Sirens	Mrs. Croft	Episode: "Looks Like Christmas"
1994	Diagnosis: Murder	Lily	Episode: "Lily"
1997	JAG	Gail Sanders	Episode: "The Guardian"
1997	The Practice	G. Warner	Episode: "Search and Seizure"
1999–2000	Once and Again	Celeste	Episodes: "The Past Is Prologue", "Strangers and Brothers"
2001	Philly	Carol Vaughn	Episode: "Light My Fire"
2002	CSI: Crime Scene Investigation	Ruth Elliott	Episode: "Cats in the Cradle..."
2003	ER	Mrs. Ferguson	Episode: "Now What?"
2003	Nip/Tuck	Annalise Anderson	Episode: "Adelle Coffin"
2003–2004	Girlfriends	Elizabeth Bickle	Episodes: "The Fast Track & the Furious", "New York Unbound"
2004	NYPD Blue	Veronica Lewis	Episode: "Old Yeller"
2004	Cold Case	Kay Lang	Episode: "Red Glare"
2004	June	Grandma P.	TV film
2005	American Dreams	Dorothy Day	Episode: "Home Again"
2005	Carnivàle	The Crone	Episode: "Old Cherry Blossom Road"
2006	Charmed	Piper (elderly)	Episode: "Forever Charmed"
2006	Our House	Rose	TV film
2006	7th Heaven	Joyce	Episode: "You Don't Know What You've Got 'Til He's Gone"
2006, 2010	Medium	Grandma Benoit	Episodes: "Twice Upon a Time", "Allison Rolen Got Married"
2007	Supernatural	Gert Case	Episode: "Red Sky at Morning"
2007–08, 2012	Desperate Housewives	Lillian Sims	Episodes: "What Would We Do Without You?", "If There's Anything I Can't Stand", "Free", "Finishing the Hat"
2009	Bones	Anne Reilly	Episode: "The Double Death of the Dearly Departed"
2011	Criminal Minds: Suspect Behavior	Mary Ellen Stahl	Episode: "Death by a Thousand Cuts"
2012	Castle	Viola Maddox	Episode: "The Blue Butterfly"
2015	The Middle	Cynthia	Episode: "Halloween VI: Tick Tock Death"
2017	Room 104	Lorraine	Episode: "My Love"
2019	NCIS	Esther Daniels	Episode: "Going Mobile"
