= One of the Hollywood Ten =

2000 Spanish-British film

- Spanish theatrical poster
- Directed by: Karl Francis
- Written by: Karl Francis
- Produced by: Karl Francis; Juan Gordon; Stuart Pollok
- Starring: Jeff Goldblum; Greta Scacchi
- Cinematography: Nigel Walters
- Edited by: John Richards
- Music by: Víctor Reyes
- Production company: Alibi Films International
- Distributed by: Buena Vista International (Spain)
- Release date: 29 September 2000 (SSFF)
- Running time: 109 minutes
- Countries: Spain; United Kingdom
- Language: English

One of the Hollywood Ten (Spanish: Punto de mira) is a 2000 Spanish-British bio-picture. The film was written and directed by Karl Francis.

The drama focuses on screenwriter/director Herbert Biberman and his efforts to make what would become the historic political film, Salt of the Earth in 1954, produced without studio backing after he was blacklisted for belonging to the American Communist Party.

== Plot ==
The film opens at the 1937 Academy Awards, where Biberman's wife, Gale Sondergaard (Greta Scacchi), wins the first ever "Best Supporting Actress" Oscar. Although the anti-Fascist sentiment in her acceptance speech gets her labelled a "commie" by some observers, she and Biberman (Jeff Goldblum) are placed under contract at Warner Bros.

He first comes under scrutiny more for his Jewish background than his political activities. Yet, with Cold War paranoia growing, a group of Hollywood directors and actors — Biberman, Sondergaard, Danny Kaye and Dalton Trumbo among them - are labelled Communists and questioned in front of Congress. After refusing to testify against his colleagues, he is imprisoned in the Federal Correctional Institution at Texarkana for a period of six months. Once released, he discovers his Hollywood career is finished.

Sondergaard suggests that her husband should direct a screenplay about the real-life 1950-51 strike waged by Mexican-American miners against the Empire Zinc Company in Bayard, New Mexico written by Michael Wilson, also a victim of the blacklist and Biberman's brother Michael. She feels the lead role of Esperanza Quintero, who rallied the wives of the unemployed miners and urged them to support their husbands, is an ideal way to jump-start her stagnating career. Biberman agrees, but after meeting with the people who participated in the strike and being inspired by their passion, he decides all roles should be played by ethnic actors.

Because the film has no studio backing and most Hollywood players fear being associated with Biberman and the project, he eventually casts local residents from Grant County, New Mexico and members of the International Union of Mine, Mill and Smelter Workers, Local 890 to fill most of the roles. Juan Chacón, the Union Local president, is cast as the fiery Ramon Quintero opposite Mexican actress Rosaura Revueltas as his wife Esperanza. Will Geer is one of only five Hollywood actors to accept a role in the production.

The FBI investigates the film's financing, attempts to steal the film's negatives and, when they can't be located, tells film-processing labs not to work on the film, incites locals who are unhappy with the film crew's presence to set fire to many of the sets and eventually deports Revueltas on bogus charges. Biberman stands his ground and completes the film, using scenes with Revueltas that were shot in her native Mexico and then smuggled into the US.

== Cast ==
- Jeff Goldblum as Herbert Biberman
- Greta Scacchi as Gale Sondergaard
- Ángela Molina as Rosaura Revueltas
- Christopher Fulford as Riffkind
- Antonio Valero as Juan Chacón
- John Sessions as Paul Jarrico
- Geraint Wyn Davies as Michael Wilson
- Sean Chapman as Edward Dmytryk
- Peter Bowles as Jack L. Warner
- Owen Brenman as Dalton Trumbo
- Jorge de Juan as Floyd
- Teresa José Berganza as Henrietta Williams
- Jorge Bosch as Joe Morales
- Daisy White as Sonya
- Luke Harrison Mendez as Dan
- Trinidad Serrano as Joan

== Background ==
Salt of the Earth caught the attention of Welsh writer-director Karl Francis when the film was released in Europe. He became determined to film The Making of Salt of the Earth and worked with fellow-Welshman Nigel Walters, the director of cinematography, for years to make the film.

Jack L. Warner, Humphrey Bogart, Edward Dmytryk, Howard Hughes, Dalton Trumbo, and George Jessel are among the real-life personalities depicted in the film.

The film was produced and shot in Madrid. Outdoor filming was done primarily in the miner towns of La Unión and Portmán (South-east of Spain)

== Critical reception ==
The New York Times film critic, Stephen Holden, generally liked the film, especially its message, but found some of the acting and the screenplay problematic. He wrote, "One of the Hollywood 10 has a strong performance by Mr. Goldblum and a refreshingly sulfurous view of 1950s Hollywood caving in to fear. As hard-hitting as the movie is, some of its performances are thuddingly overstated, and its screenplay wears its didacticism on its sleeve. One of the Hollywood 10 may be a useful film, but it is far from a great one."

Leslie Camhi, writing for The Village Voice, liked the work of director Karl Francis and how he kept close to the true story, and wrote, "As Biberman, Jeff Goldblum mutes his considerable charisma; his stilted intellectual is so consumed by ideology that he hardly notices the harm done to his wife, actress Gale Sondergaard (played by firebrand Greta Scacchi), whose Oscar-winning career was cut short by his unflinching idealism. But director Francis shifts skillfully between scenes of glamour and oppression, sticking close to this compelling history."

Variety magazine film critic David Rooney was critical of the film's direction and believed the film is only worthy of cable television. He wrote, "A fascinating chapter in Hollywood history gets unremarkable treatment in One of the Hollywood Ten, which centers on blacklisted director Herbert J. Biberman...[but] the pedestrian approach employed by writer-director Karl Francis gives it the look and feel of a lackluster cable movie, which would appear to be its commercial destination."

== Distribution ==
The film was released in Spain by The Walt Disney Company, and debuted at the San Sebastián Film Festival on 29 September 2000.

It was featured at the Commonwealth Film Festival, Great Britain; the New York Jewish Film Festival; the San Diego Jewish Film Festival; the San Francisco Jewish Film Festival; the Washington Jewish Film Festival; and other film festivals.

== See also ==
- The Hollywood Ten - (1950, documentary directed by John Berry)
- The Majestic
- Hollywood blacklist
