= Films about race =

List of films

A great number of movies have been made about race relations, or with a strong racial theme over the last century, from D. W. Griffith's The Birth of a Nation (1915) to Marvel Studios' Black Panther (2018).

== Early years (1915–1960) ==
D. W. Griffith's 1915 film The Birth of a Nation set the precedent for heavily racialized stereotypes of African Americans (many played by white actors in blackface) as clowns or predators, and cast the Ku Klux Klan as the saviours of white America. Later films, such as Dark Command (1940), Song of the South (1946) and Gone With the Wind (1939), repeated some of those stereotypes.

Other films such as the Marx Brothers' A Day at the Races and Hellzapoppin' showcased early black performers including Whitey's Lindy Hoppers and Slim and Slam. With Carmen Jones (1954) and Porgy and Bess (1959), Hollywood put George Gershwin's and Oscar Hammerstein II's Broadway shows – that reworked Jazz performances for white audiences – on screen with stars Harry Belafonte and Dorothy Dandridge.

Race films marketed to black audiences included Hi-De-Ho featuring Jazz performer Cab Calloway.

The quintessential American film, the western was often about implicitly about race, since it described the westward journey of colonists into the lands of Native Americans.

== Civil Rights era ==
With the growth of the Civil Rights Movement Hollywood was on the whole on the liberal side, with films such as To Kill a Mockingbird (1962), West Side Story (1961), Guess Who's Coming to Dinner (1967) and In the Heat of the Night (1967) looking at race prejudice critically.

== "Blaxploitation" and "gangsta" films ==
With the rise of the Black Panther Party, Hollywood tried to stay relevant with Black Power-themed films such as Shaft (1971), Superfly (1972) and Foxy Brown (1974), which became known as Blaxploitation films. However, the new genre was an opportunity for director Melvin van Peebles and actors including Richard Rountree, Pam Grier and also for musician Curtis Mayfield whose sound track accompanied the 1972 hit Superfly.

Though Blaxploitation genre is in the past, filmmakers have excited black and white audiences with stories of gangs and crime that tread a fine line between glorifying and vilifying gangsters, such as New Jack City (1991), South Central (1992) and Juice (1992). Rap music, too, has given a new dimension to black gang films, with All Eyez on Me (2017) about the life and death of Tupac Shakur, and Notorious (2009) about the killing of Notorious B.I.G.

== Race revenge fantasies ==
In the 1970s and 1980s a backlash against Civil Rights was met by more films about black criminality threatening white communities. In Sudden Impact (1983), Clint Eastwood's character Harry Callahan goads a black rapist holding a woman hostage, "Go ahead, make my day" – meaning, "Shoot her, so I can shoot you." The Dirty Harry series of films, like the Death Wish one, appealed to a reaction against Civil Rights with fantasy violence against black and other criminals.

Another way that films titillated white audiences was with fantasies of black people rising up against white society. The British film Zulu (1964) showed a small platoon of Redcoats fighting against thousands of Zulu warriors at Rorke's Drift at the end of the 19th century. Later John Carpenter achieved a similar effect surrounding a police station with a coalescence of Puerto Rican gangs in Assault on Precinct 13 (1976).

== Historical civil rights, Jim Crow era, Civil War and slavery films ==
By the 1990s American attitudes on race were becoming more liberal and a new wave of films looked back at the Civil Rights Movement as history, beginning with Alan Parker's Mississippi Burning of 1989, right through to Ghosts of Mississippi in 1996. More recently, Ava DuVernay's 2014 film Selma has shown there is much more in the civil rights era. The Civil War also got a different historical treatment in the 1989 film Glory, about black Union troops. Civil War dramas like Lincoln (2012) and Free State of Jones (2016). Historical dramas proved a rich seam for Hollywood which went on to deal with slavery in Steven Spielberg's Amistad (1997) and Steven McQueen's 12 Years a Slave (2013). More radical black leaders, such as Malcolm X and the Black Panthers, had their story told in films by Spike Lee and Mario Van Peebles in 1992 and 1995.

== Social comment films since 1990 ==
As well as a great rise in the number of historical dramas around the issues of slavery, civil rights and historical racism, more social comment films about race relations have been made since the 1990s. Spike Lee's breakout movie Do the Right Thing (1989) opened up the field for a lot more searching examination of race in the present day. Films such as Justin Simien's 2014 comedy Dear White People, the Academy award-winning Moonlight (2016) and Jordan Peele's 2017 horror film Get Out show that film audiences continue to be gripped by racial conflict.

== Notable films with a race theme, by year released ==
Year	Film	Director	Notes
2019	Harriet	Kasi Lemmons	Cynthia Erivo, Leslie Odom Jr., Joe Alwyn, and Janelle Monáe star in this biopic about Harriet Tubman's escape from slavery and the subsequent, dangerous missions she led to liberate hundreds of slaves through the Underground Railroad.
2018	Yardie	Idris Elba	Aml Ameen and Stephen Graham in a film of Victor Headley's novel about West Indian gangs in London.
2018	Crazy Rich Asians	John M. Chu	Constance Wu and Henry Golding star in a comedy/drama based on the 2013 novel of the same name by Kevin Kwan.
2018	Whitney	Kevin McDonald	Documentary on the life of Whitney Houston.
2018	Black Panther	Ryan Coogler	Chadwick Boseman stars as the Marvel Comics character in a film that grossed $1.345 billion.
2018	Superfly	Director X	Trevor Jackson stars as Youngblood Priest in the remake of Super Fly.
2017	Detroit	Kathryn Bigelow	Shocking depiction of police brutality in the Algiers Motel incident during riots in Detroit in 1967.
2017	Get Out	Jordan Peele	Sci-fi horror about a predatory white conspiracy to implant their consciousnesses into black bodies grossed $252 million
2017	Kings	Deniz Gamze Ergüven	A South Central recluse helps a working-class mother during the 1992 Los Angeles riots, with Halle Berry and Daniel Craig.
2017	All Eyez on Me	Benny Boom	The biopic of rapper Tupac Shakur.
2017	Mudbound	Dee Rees	Tragic drama of two farming families one white and one black, based on the novel of the same name by Hillary Jordan.
2017	Gook	Justin Chon	Two Korean-American brothers in the midst of the 1992 Los Angeles riots.
2016	Zootopia	Rich Moore	A cop solves a case about predators turning savage, led by a prey supremacist organisation who is known for a hatred against predator species.
2016	The Birth of a Nation	Nate Parker	Nat Turner's slave revolt in Virginia in 1831.
2016	Moonlight	Barry Jenkins	Tarell Alvin McCraney's story of growing up black and gay in America grossed over $65 million worldwide against a budget of $4 million.
2016	Loving	Jeff Nichols	The story of Richard and Mildred Loving's marriage and the 1967 Supreme Court judgment against the State of Virginia's outlawing of interracial marriage, with Ruth Negga and Joel Edgerton.
2016	Hidden Figures	Theodore Melfi	Taraji P. Henson is Katherine Goble leading a section of black women mathematicians working at NASA to computerise the Mercury Seven space mission.
2016	I Am Not Your Negro	Raoul Peck	The story of writer and activist James Baldwin told through contemporaneous footage.
2016	Fences	Denzel Washington	The film of August Wilson's Pulitzer Prize-winning play about a father, frustrated at the stymying of his baseball career, and taking it out on his son.
2016	A United Kingdom	Amma Asante	Based on the true-life romance between Sir Seretse Khama and his wife Ruth Williams Khama in Bechuanaland and the imperial authorities' attempts to prevent it.
2016	Free State of Jones	Gary Ross	The story of Newton Knight's revolt against the Confederacy during the American Civil War.
2016	Nina	Cynthia Mort	Biopic of jazz singer Nina Simone starring Zoe Saldaña.
2015	Straight Outta Compton	F. Gary Gray	The story of rappers N.W.A, which grossed over $200 million, four times its budget.
2015	The Black Panthers: Vanguard of the Revolution	Stanley Nelson Jr.	Documentary on the Black Panther Party and their repression under the FBI's Cointelpro program.
2014	Selma	Ava DuVernay	About Martin Luther King Jr. and the Southern Christian Leadership Conference's arguments and preparations for the momentous 1967 Civil Rights march from Selma, Alabama, to Washington.
2014	Dear White People	Justin Simien	A comedy about members of a black fraternity house negotiating the racial assumptions of their white counterparts at college.
2013	12 Years a Slave	Steve McQueen	The English director's film of Solomon Northrup's memoir of the same name (1853) about a free man being abducted from the North to serve as a slave in the American South.
2013	The Butler	Lee Daniels	Forest Whitaker plays Cecil Gaines (drawn from Wil Haygood's article "A Butler Well Served by This Election" in The Washington Post about Eugene Allen) who works as a butler at the White House through successive presidencies.
2013	Belle	Amma Asante	Loosely based on the life of Dido Elizabeth Belle and Lord Mansfield's ruling on the Zong massacre in Georgian England.
2013	Mandela: Long Walk to Freedom	Justin Chadwick	Biopic of South African anti-Apartheid leader and President Nelson Mandela starring Idris Elba.
2012	Django Unchained	Quentin Tarantino	Controversial western with a slave revenge theme, starring Jamie Foxx and Samuel L. Jackson.
2011	Winnie Mandela	Darrell Roodt	Sympathetic biopic of anti-Apartheid leader Winnie Mandela.
2011	The Help	Tate Taylor	Based on Kathryn Stockett's book of the same name about a black maids standing up to their white mistresses, with the help of an aspiring writer.
2009	Precious	Lee Daniels	Grim story of parental rape and neglect in a deprived neighbourhood.
2009	Invictus	Clint Eastwood	About the struggle to re-launch the Springboks rugby team in post-Apartheid South Africa.
2009	Notorious	George Tillman Jr.	The life and murder of rap star Christopher Wallace, a.k.a. The Notorious B.I.G.
2008	Gran Torino	Clint Eastwood	The unlikely friendship between Korean War veteran and a Hmong family in Los Angeles.
2005	American Gangster	Ridley Scott	Frank Lucas (Denzel Washington) works his way up from sidekick to gang leader, pursued by Russell Crowe's lawman.
2004	Manderlay	Lars von Trier	A disturbing allegory of slavery from the Danish avant garde director.
2004	Crash	Paul Haggis	Multi-plotted state of the nation film with Don Cheadle's character harassed by a policeman, and other stories of the challenges of different migrants and citizens of Los Angeles.
2002	Dirty Pretty Things	Stephen Frears	The struggles of migrants in London.
2001	Ali	Michael Mann	Will Smith stars as the legendary heavyweight boxing champion Muhammed Ali.
1999	Introducing Dorothy Dandridge	Martha Coolidge	Biopic of the actress Dorothy Dandridge with Halle Berry made for television.
1999	The Hurricane	Norman Jewison	Biopic of boxing champion Rubin Carter falsely accused and imprisoned for a triple murder, starring Denzel Washington.
1998	Beloved	Jonathan Demme	Horror-drama film based on Toni Morrison's 1987 novel of the same name.
1997	Amistad	Steven Spielberg	The trial over the mutiny of the enslaved Mende people on board the Amistad in 1839.
1997	Miss Evers' Boys	Joseph Sargent	HBO television film based on David Feldshuh's play about a U.S. federal government experiment that led to men being left untreated for syphilis.
1996	Ghosts of Mississippi	Rob Reiner	Courtroom drama based on the trial of Byron De La Beckwith for the murder of civil rights activist Medgar Evers.
1996	When We Were Kings	Leon Gast	Documentary about the Rumble in the Jungle heavyweight fight between Muhammed Ali and George Foreman in Zaire in 1974.
1995	Panther	Mario van Peebles	Dramatization of the Black Panthers' struggle against racism, based on Melvin van Peebles' book.
1995	Jefferson in Paris	James Ivory	On US President-to-be Thomas Jefferson's affairs as ambassador in Paris, and his relationship with Sally Hemings (played by Thandie Newton).
1994	Corrina, Corrina	Jessie Nelson	Interracial love story in 1950s America with Whoopi Goldberg and Ray Liotta.
1992	Sarafina!	Darrell Roodt	A coming-of-age story in the midst of the Soweto riots, filmed in South Africa.
1992	Malcolm X	Spike Lee	Biopic of the inspirational Black Muslim leader starring Denzel Washington.
1992	Juice	Ernest R. Dickerson	With Tupac Shakur and Omar Epps.
1992	South Central	Stephen Milburn Anderson	Father and son learn to break ties with a street gang, an adaptation of the 1987 novel Crips by Donald Bakeer.
1991	Boyz n the Hood	John Singleton	Cuba Gooding Jr. and Ice Cube star in this story of gang life in Los Angeles.
1991	New Jack City	Mario Van Peebles	Wesley Snipes stars as Nino Brown, leader of a ruthless drug gang in the midst of New York's crack epidemic.
1990	The Long Walk Home	Richard Pearce	A drama with the Montgomery bus boycott of 1955–56 as a background, starring Whoopi Goldberg and Sissy Spacek.
1989	Driving Miss Daisy	Bruce Beresford	Gentle comedy based on Alfred Uhry's play of the same name set in the Civil Rights era.
1989	Mississippi Burning	Alan Parker	Parker's film of the Civil Rights era contest over desegregation.
1989	Do the Right Thing	Spike Lee	Acclaimed comedy-drama of racial tensions and rioting in Brooklyn.
1989	Glory	Edward Zwick	Matthew Broderick stars as the anxious white commander of an experimental all-black troop of the Union Army in the American Civil War.
1989	For Queen and Country	Martin Stellman	Denzel Washington stars as a Falklands War veteran returning to riot-torn Tottenham, England.
1988	I'm Gonna Git You Sucka	Keenan Ivory Wayans	A parody version of a Blaxploitation film.
1987	Cry Freedom	Richard Attenborough	The story of Steve Biko's detention and murder, and his friendship with the journalist Donald Woods.
1986	Absolute Beginners	Julien Temple	Based on Colin MacInnes' novel of the same name, the film revolves around the 1958 Notting Hill race riots and features Slim Gaillard and Steven Berkoff's impersonation of Oswald Mosley.
1985	The Color Purple	Steven Spielberg	Based on Alice Walker's novel of the same name and starring Danny Glover and Oprah Winfrey in a story of pre-civil rights Georgia.
1978	The Wiz	Sidney Lumet	A black cast re-make of The Wizard of Oz starring Diana Ross.
1977	Roots	Marvin J. Chomsky	ABC-TV miniseries based on Alex Haley's 1976 novel Roots: The Saga of an American Family, starring Levar Burton.
1976	The Last Supper	Tomás Gutiérrez Alea	Cuban drama about a pious planter inviting his slaves to a Christian dinner, only to encourage them to revolt.
1975	Mandingo	Richard Fleischer	Ken Norton is a slave put to exhibition fighting by planters, with illicit sex between slaves and masters driving a lot of the action.
1972	The Harder They Come	Perry Henzell	Jamaica-based story of an embattled reggae star, played by Jimmy Cliff considered a breakthrough for reggae in the United States.
1974	Foxy Brown	Jack Hill	Pam Grier stars in this Blaxploitation film as a woman fighting back against exploitation.
1973	Cleopatra Jones	Jack Starrett	Tamara Dobson stars in this Blaxploitation film as an undercover agent exposing the drugs industry.
1972	Superfly	Gordon Parks, Jr.	Ron O'Neal stars in this Blaxploitation film as a drug dealer trying to get out of the business – notable for its Curtis Mayfield soundtrack
1971	Sweet Sweetback's Baadasssss Song	Melvin van Peebles	A kaleidoscopic journey through race-torn America.
1971	Shaft	Gordon Parks	Private detective John Shaft (Richard Rountree) is hired by a Harlem gangster to rescue his kidnapped daughter in a film that highlights black power, with a strong Isaac Hayes soundtrack.
1970	Little Big Man	Arthur Penn	Dustin Hoffman stars as a boy who goes to live amongst the Cheyenne, witnessing the massacres carried out by Custer's Seventh Cavalry.
1970	Soldier Blue	Ralph Nelson	Candice Bergen stars as a Cheyenne captured in the midst of a massacre of Native Americans.
1970	Watermelon Man	Melvin van Peebles	An inveterate racist wakes up to find he has turned black in a caustic comedy inspired as much by Kafka's Metamorphosis as by John Howard Griffin's Black Like Me.
1970	The Landlord	Hal Ashby	This Norman Jewison-produced film stars Beau Bridges as heir to a slum landlord, whose feelings for his black tenants – in particular Lanie (Marki Bey), a dancer at a local black club – run away with him..
1969	Slaves	Herbert J. Biberman	Dionne Warwick and Ossie Davis in a lurid tale of plantation slavery.
1969	Burn!	Gillo Pontecorvo	Marlon Brando plays a political agent who foments a slave revolt in a Caribbean island, only to help reinstate an oppressive wage-slavery in its place.
1967	To Sir With Love	James Clavell	Sidney Poitier plays a teacher arrived from the Caribbean to teach in a run-down school in London, based on E. R. Braithwaite's 1959 autobiographical novel of the same name.
1967	Guess Who's Coming to Dinner	Stanley Kramer	Sidney Poitier, Katharine Hepburn and Spencer Tracy star in this comedy of manners about liberal parents confronted by their daughter's black boyfriend.
1967	In the Heat of the Night	Norman Jewison	Virgil Tibbs (Sidney Poitier) is a detective from Philadelphia investigating a murder case and confronting prejudice in small-town Mississippi.
1967	Hurry Sundown	Otto Preminger	The complex race relations of multiple couples and community problems of the contemporary South in 1946.
1964	Zulu	Cy Endfield	A white outpost is beset by thousands of Zulu warriors in the British Empire story of the Battle of Rorke's Drift.
1962	To Kill A Mockingbird	Robert Mulligan	Gregory Peck stars in the film of Harper Lee's 1960 Pulitzer Prize-winning novel of the same name, the story of a black defendant falsely accused of rape.
1961	West Side Story	Robert Wise and Jerome Robbins	Gang warfare between the Puerto Rican Sharks and the Anglo Jets in this film of the 1957 Broadway musical of the same name (itself inspired by William Shakespeare's play Romeo and Juliet).
1959	Porgy and Bess	Otto Preminger	Film of George and Ira Gershwin's opera of DuBose Heyward's 1925 novel Porgy, starring Sidney Poitier and Dorothy Dandridge.
1959	Black Orpheus	Marcel Camus	A reworking of the Greek legend of Orpheus and Eurydice in the Brazilian carnival.
1959	Imitation of Life	Douglas Sirk	Susan Kohner stars as a mixed race woman who passes for white, in a film adaptation of Fannie Hurst's novel of the same name.
1957	12 Angry Men	Sidney Lumet	A jury decide the fate of a "boy" charged with murder – though the race of the accused is never stated, the film deals with prejudice as one juror denounces slum-born people, no better than animals who kill for fun.
1954	Carmen Jones	Otto Preminger	Sidney Poitier's airman is seduced by Dorothy Dandridge in the film of the 1943 musical, itself a re-working adaptation of Bizet's Carmen.
1954	The Salt of the Earth	Herbert J. Biberman	Hispanic American miners fight against injustice based on the 1951 strike against the Empire Zinc Company in Grant County, New Mexico.
1951	Cry, the Beloved Country	Zoltan Korda	Based on Alan Paton's 1948 novel of the same name about a black minister's journey to Johannesburg to find his son in Apartheid South Africa.
1949	Pinky	Elia Kazan	A light-skinned black woman has been "passing" for white while at school in the North. She falls in love with a doctor who knows nothing about her black heritage.
1947	Hi-De-Ho	Josh Binney	A race film showcasing jazz performer Cab Calloway.
1946	Song of the South	Harve Foster and Wilfred Jackson	Walt Disney's mixed live action and animation film of Joel Chandler Harris's Uncle Remus stories.
1941	Hellzapoppin'	H. C. Potter	Zany musical showcasing Slim and Slam (Slim Gaillard and Slam Stewart) and Whitey's Lindy Hoppers.
1940	Dark Command	Raoul Walsh	A Union-supporting John Wayne tries to uphold the law against the Confederate hold-outs of Quantrill's Raiders.
1939	Gone With the Wind	Victor Fleming	Historical drama of a southern family in the American Civil War and Reconstruction era from Margaret Mitchell's 1936 novel of the same name.
1937	A Day at the Races	Sam Wood	Marx Brothers film showcasing Whitey's Lindy Hoppers.
1936	Song of Freedom	J. Elder Wills	Paul Robeson stars as John Zinga, an African dockworker who becomes an opera singer.
1936	Show Boat	James Whale	Irene Dunne stars in the story of the Mississippi show boat featuring music by Oscar Hammerstein II and performances by Hattie McDaniel and Paul Robeson – who sings "Ole Man River".
1935	Sanders of the River	Zoltan Korda	Leslie Banks stars as the colonial officer who takes on Paul Robeson's African chief.
1934	Imitation of Life	John M. Stahl	Fredi Washington stars as a mixed-race woman who passes for white, in a film adaptation of Fannie Hurst's novel of the same name.
1933	The Emperor Jones	Dudley Murphy	Paul Robeson stars as Brutus Jones, a convict who escapes to make himself emperor of a Caribbean Island, based on the Eugene O'Neill play of the same title.
1930	Borderline	Kenneth Macpherson	An African-American couple played by Paul and Eslanda Robeson stay at a hotel in Europe with group of hedonists. An interracial love triangle shocks the townsfolk.
1915	The Birth of a Nation	D. W. Griffith	The American Civil War and Reconstruction era with the Ku Klux Klan saving the white nation from black carpetbaggers.

== See also ==
- Race in horror films
