= List of films by the Hollywood Ten =

This is a list of films by the Hollywood Ten, who were cited for contempt of Congress and blacklisted after refusing to answer questions about their alleged involvement with the Communist Party USA. The Hollywood films of this period that were scrutinized by the House Un-American Activities Committee (HUAC) included spy and private eye thrillers, political melodrama and film noir.

HUAC echoed fears that movies could shape attitudes and affect both foreign and domestic politics. Investigators were especially focused on the screenwriter's guild. Screenwriters, in particular, were targeted by interest groups who sought to purge Hollywood of subversive and "Un-American" sentiments. Nine of the Hollywood Ten were screenwriters and several had worked on wartime films that contained explicitly "instructional" anti-fascist sentiment. They had been successful "planting messages" into officially sanctioned projects like Tender Comrade (1943), Sahara (1943), Action in the North Atlantic (1943), The Cross of Lorraine (1943), None Shall Escape (1944) and The Master Race (1944) and thus, it stood to reason, they could also add "subversive sentiments" into postwar films. The prevailing belief was that the screenwriter's guild was infiltrated by Communists who were trying to use propaganda to "subvert the American way." Films deemed "suspicious" by HUAC were rejected by film goers - some were pulled from circulation.

In a preliminary FBI report from 1943, the Los Angeles FBI identified seven released films that contained "Communist propaganda" and nine other films "that have been made or are now in the process of being made but have not yet been released" that contained "propaganda." The LA office stated that the screenwriters who write "propaganda material [are] known to be Communists or followers of the Communist party line." In reaction to the initial hearings of the Hollywood Ten, film studios released the Waldorf Statement where they agreed to create the blacklist barring the employment of Communists.

Some blacklisted filmmakers continued to make films. Salt of the Earth was written by Herbert Biberman, one of the Hollywood Ten, and made outside Hollywood with support from the International Union of Mine, Mill and Smelter Workers.

== Alvah Bessie ==
- Northern Pursuit (1943)
- Objective, Burma! (1945)
- Hotel Berlin (1945)
- Smart Woman (1948)

== Herbert Biberman ==
- Action in Arabia (1944)
- The Master Race (1944)
- Abilene Town (1946)
- New Orleans 1947
- Salt of the Earth (1954)
- Slaves (1969)

== Lester Cole ==
- None Shall Escape (1944)
- Blood on the Sun (1945)
- Objective, Burma! (1945)
- Born Free (1966)
- Operation Eichmann (1961)

== Edward Dmytryk ==
- Counter-Espionage (1942)
- Tender Comrade (1943)
- Hitler's Children (1943)
- Behind the Rising Sun (1943)
- Murder, My Sweet (1944)
- Back to Bataan (1945)
- Crossfire (1947)
- The Young Lions (1948)
- The Juggler (1953)
- The Caine Mutiny (1954)
- Broken Lance (1954)

== Ring Lardner Jr. ==
- The Cross of Lorraine (1943)
- Laura (1944)
- Cloak and Dagger (1946)
- Forever Amber (1947)
- The Adventures of Robin Hood (10 episodes 1955-1956)

== John Howard Lawson ==
- Algiers (1938)
- Blockade (1938)
- Sahara (1943)
- Action in the North Atlantic (1943)
- Cry, the Beloved Country (1951)

== Albert Maltz ==
- This Gun for Hire (1942)
- Destination Tokyo (1943)
- Pride of the Marines (1945)
- Cloak and Dagger (1946)
- Broken Arrow (1950)
- Two Mules for Sister Sara (1970 - after blacklist)
