= Revueltas =

Revueltas may refer to:

== People ==
- Silvestre Revueltas (1899–1940), Mexican composer
- Rosaura Revueltas (1910–1996), Mexican actress
- José Revueltas (1914–1976), Mexican writer and activist

== Other ==
- Pupusas revueltas, a dish

== See also ==
- Revueltas Sánchez, a surname
