= International Union of Mine, Mill and Smelter Workers, Local 890 =

Coordinates: 32.7562°N 108.1375°W

The International Union of Mine, Mill and Smelter Workers, Local 890 building is located at 302 Tom Foy Blvd. in Bayard, New Mexico. Bayard locals refer to the Local 890 building as the "Union Hall", where it is used as a community meeting place.

== History ==
On October 17, 1950 workers decided to strike after contract negotiations stalled in protest of racial injustice and indignities suffered while employed by Empire Zinc Company, then based out of Hanover, New Mexico. Mexican American workers suffered unequal pay and segregation in pay lines for Anglo and Mexican workers. The small communities of Bayard, Hurley and Santa Rita, where the workers lived, were segregated and the Mexicans suffered inferior sanitation, no electricity and unpaved streets. The public pool and movie theatre were also segregated. Mexican Americans were subject to police brutality.

In response to all of this the miners formed picket lines at the gates of the mine and held the strike until June 1951 when a court injunction ordered for picketing to cease under threat of incarceration. The Labor Management Relations Act of 1947 restricted the activity and leverage of labor unions. The wives of the miners formed the Ladies Auxiliary 209 and took up the cause of picketing on June 12, 1951 since the injunction only banned the miners themselves from doing so. Many of the women were threatened and jailed along with their children for protesting. The picket held for another six months until January 25, 1952, when negotiations were settled granting miners increased wages, benefits and housing conditions. This was the first successful mining strike in American history.

== Film ==
News of the victory quickly spread and in 1953 Hollywood producer Paul Jarrico and director Herbert Biberman visited the Union Hall with a budget of $250,000 and the intention of recreating the story of the striking men and women for the 1954 film Salt of the Earth.

They cast five professional actors, among them Rosaura Revueltas, a native Mexican actress, as the leading role of pregnant striker Esperanza Quintero. The rest of the cast and extras were the strikers themselves and local people. Among them was Juan Chacon, who was Local 890 union president for many years, who was cast in the leading role of labor organizer Ramon Quintero.

There were attempts to disrupt the shooting of the film including FBI investigation into its financing, flyovers by noisy aircraft interrupting production, rifle shots fired at the set. and the film had to be stored and edited in secret. Film processing labs and projectionist unions were rumored to have been told not to work on the film. The leading actress Rosaura Revueltas was deported back to Mexico during filming.

Only twelve theaters in the country would screen the film and an official premiere in New York City did not happen until 10 years after completion. After filming, in 1957 director Herbert Biberman was questioned by the House Committee on Un-American Activities for Communist ties. He refused their questions and spent time in a federal prison. Jerrico, Biberman, Ruvueltas and actors Will Geer and Michael Wilson were part of the Hollywood blacklist during the Era of McCarthyism. The film itself was blacklisted, denounced by the United States House of Representatives, and was boycotted by the American Legion.

In 2004, on the 50th anniversary of the making of the movie, the film was inducted to the Library of Congress National Film Registry for posterity as one of the top 100 films representing Americana.

Ellen R. Baker wrote a book about the two-year strike and the film production called On Strike and On Film.

== Preservation ==
Juntos de la Union is a society for the preservation of The Mine Mill and Smelter Workers Local 890 headquarters located in Bayard, New Mexico. The group was founded by Hueteotil Lopez of Silver City, New Mexico and has proposed that the Union Hall be recognized as a National Historic Landmark on the National Register of Historic Places.

Juntos de la Union has secured a letter of support for the proposal from retired U.S. Senator Jeff Bingaman of the Second New Mexico Congressional District. The Wisconsin Labor History Society and the City of Bayard, New Mexico Town Council has submitted letters of support as well.

In October 2014 the Local 890 Union, one of the longest running unions in the country was disbanded by vote of the miners working now under Freeport-McMoRan.

Local Silver City artist Fred Barraza with the support of the Mimbres Region Arts Council painted a mural of a photograph of the Ladies Auxiliary 290 that spans the side of the Union Hall.
