= Empire Zinc strike =

1950–1952 American labor dispute

The Empire Zinc strike, also known as the Salt of the Earth strike, was a 15-month-long miners' strike in Grant County, New Mexico against the Empire Zinc Company for its discriminatory pay. The strike drew national attention, and after it was settled in 1952, a movie entitled Salt of the Earth (1954) was released that offered a fictionalized version of events.

== Background ==
The Empire Zinc Company, a subsidiary of New Jersey Zinc Company, owned and operated a zinc mine located near Hanover, New Mexico, approximately 13 miles east of Silver City, New Mexico. In 1950, Empire Zinc employed 128 people in Hanover, of which 92 were members of the International Union of Mine, Mill and Smelter Workers (IUMMSW), Local 890, 12 Anglos and 80 Hispanics. Empire Zinc participated in, and exploited, the discrimination and racism toward Hispanics in southern New Mexico. Underground workers were Hispanics, while a large majority of hourly workers on the surface (mill and repair shop workers) were Anglos. All office and management employees were also Anglos. Hispanics and Anglos were also separated in the town of Hanover, where 90% of its employees lived. There were four tiers of housing—the best for managers, then office and technical workers, Anglo miners, and finally Hispanic workers, who often built their own houses on land owned and rented by Empire Zinc. Hispanics in company housing did not have indoor plumbing. While all 12 of the Anglo unionists went on strike, no Anglo striker participated in strike activities (though some Anglos who worked at other mines in the district were active in the union). Most Anglo workers at Empire Zinc found work elsewhere or returned as strikebreakers. Wage rates for laborers, muckers, and miners (jobs held usually by Hispanics in the Southwest) were significantly lower in Arizona and New Mexico than in Utah, Nevada, or Montana, where Anglos worked these jobs. Pay scales for trade workers and surface workers, on the other hand, were approximately the same in all western mining districts. In contrast to the film, Salt of the Earth, hours and wages were the major focus of the strike and negotiations, rather than safety and discriminatory housing.

== The strike ==
Negotiations for a new contract began on July 18, 1950. Representing Local 890 were international union representative Clinton Jencks, president Cipriano Montoya, vice-president Ernesto Velasquez, Vicente Becerra, Pablo Montoya, and Fred Barreras. Charles Graves, a negotiator and human relations manager for New Jersey Zinc, bargained for Empire Zinc. At this first meeting, Graves refused to address any issues other than wage rates. Local 890's negotiating team held firm on pay for all time spent underground, reducing redundant job categories (which were used to reduce pay for Hispanic workers), and paid holidays, which all other mining companies had provided since 1944, when prodded by the War Labor Board. At that time, the NWLB allowed Empire to pay a fixed differential pay scale that substituted for these benefits, which left its workers with a longer work day. Empire refused to increase the rate for it paid for lunch breaks when general wage rates increased in the mining district. These two issues—pay for lunch time and 6 paid holidays—formed the foundation of the union's demands. Local 890 had tried to negotiate housing conditions and rent with Empire Zinc for years, but the company refused to bargain on housing issues. Negotiations remained deadlocked for over two months. On September 29, Graves placed advertisements to local newspapers and sent letters to its employees announcing a 5-cent hourly wage increase and an increase in the work week to 48 hours (actually 51 hours, including lunch). Empire alleged that the union had created an impasse, and did not want a settlement. Local 890 requested continuing negotiations, but Graves left town, and no new negotiations were offered. On October 17, 1950, Local 890 went on strike.

Months passed with no sign of compromise. Despite record high zinc prices accompanying the Korean War, Empire made no attempt to reopen the mine through the winter and spring. The absence of detailed haggling over the prices of various benefit and wage packages suggested that Empire was intent on breaking the union. As the strike went on inconclusively for months, the leadership of IUMMSW increasingly felt that it could not be won, and urged Clinton Jencks, its representative in Grant County, to convince the strikers to accept Empire's offer. When Jencks and a majority of Local 890's membership refused to give up, IUMMSW's executive board voted to take control of the strike and negotiations. Following this development, dissent simmered within Local 890. A few men deserted the picket lines to find work and many others asked the strike committee to allow them to get jobs. Many of the miners who were released from strike duty complained about having to give 25% of their wages to the strike fund, and the rate was eventually lowered to 15%. Empire seized the opportunity to undermine the union, regularly sending letters to strikers, urging them to return to work. An attempt in Local 890 to hold a secret ballot on whether to drop some demands was derailed. By the end of May, 1951, 14 unionists had signed a back-to-work petition, and Empire added to that number salaried non-union employees and claimed in advertisements that 28 employees wanted to end the strike.

=== Ladies Auxiliary picket line ===
On June 7, 1951, Empire escalated its attack on the union, running a full-page ad in the Silver City Daily Press, announcing that it would reopen the mine because of the back-to-work petition. Company officials had already met with County Sheriff Leslie Goforth and District Attorney Thomas Foy and obtained assurances that the road to the mine would be opened. Goforth said he needed more deputies to deal with the union, and Empire promised to provide funds for 24 new deputies. The picket lines were reinforced by unionists from other mines and, for the first time, many women and children joined them. Arrests were made, but as soon as picketers were arrested, more stepped in to take their places. No strikebreakers were able to enter the mine. Empire immediately requested a restraining order from District Judge Archibald Marshall, and he granted it the next day. The strikers met that night at the union hall to discuss their options—the discussions continued past midnight. Some called for a general strike in the mining district, others pointed out that they would face huge fines if the injunction were ignored, but everyone agreed that giving up after eight months of deprivation would be too bitter of a pill to swallow. Jencks and Bob Hollowwa, another IUMMSW representative brought in to help, argued that having the women of the Ladies Auxiliary take over the picket line could circumvent the injunction because it prohibited only "union members" from blocking the road. Most of the women present embraced the idea and said they were capable of handling the job. Most men were against it, saying it was too dangerous. After several votes, with all having a vote, a motion for the women to take over the strike lines for 24 hours passed by a small majority. The next day the women successfully defended the strike lines and confidently returned to the union meetings to secure an open-ended extension of their status as defenders of the strike line. On June 16, Sheriff Goforth and his new deputies made a full-scale assault on the picket line using tear gas to disperse the women picketers. They withstood the assault, but Goforth arrested 62 people: 45 women and 17 children. District Attorney Foy asked New Mexico Governor Edwin Mechem for assistance, but he was aghast, replying that all picketers should be released on their own recognizance, and stating that the NM State Police would not serve as strike breakers. At first, the DA told the women he would release them if they would promise to stay away from the picket lines, but they steadfastly refused. Late that night, he relented and let them go without conditions. Time and Life magazines and the New York Times covered the story. On June 24, the Federal Mediation and Conciliation Service called on Empire and Local 890 to allow them to arbitrate the issues. Local 890 accepted, but Empire rejected the offer.

=== Media attention ===
Editorials in the Silver City Daily Press became increasingly hostile to the union and openly racist. Todd Ely, editor of the Daily Press, wrote: "Mexico, of course, is poverty stricken because its early settlers lost their identity in a mestizo melting pot that lowered the general level of culture to a point little above that of the swarming aborigines." Moreover, the District Judge, District Attorney, and the Silver City magistrate judge remained unmoved by the union's arguments. They not only belonged to a socio-economic class very different from that of the miners, but also were not politically vulnerable to the rural labor vote, and so had little reason to accommodate the miners.

As the strike gained national attention, the issue of communist subversion, which was a national preoccupation in those years, began to overshadow the labor issues upon which the strike was based. A very public conflict between the Congress of Industrial Organizations (CIO) and the IUMMSW over political policy and charges of communist infiltration had played out in the years leading up to the strike, and had resulted in the expulsion of IUMMSW from the CIO. Even more publicity over this issue occurred when Maurice Travis, President of the IUMMSW, and Nathan Witt, its chief counsel, traveled to Silver City to attend a hearing on the extension of the injunction against blocking Empire's mine road. Both were either former or current members of the CPUSA. Travis, a large man who wore a black eye patch to cover an eye he lost as the result of a KKK attack when organizing in Alabama, asserted that Empire had bought its injunction—this later resulted in a contempt of court citation. Witt drew even more attention because he had been a prominent member of Franklin Roosevelt's administration, serving as Secretary of the National Labor Relations Board (NLRB) from 1937 to 1940. Witt had become a frequent target of Joseph McCarthy. Whittaker Chambers accused Witt of being a leader of the Ware Group, and Lee Pressman confirmed that Witt was a member of the Ware Group in testimony before the House Un-American Activities Committee in 1950. Witt did not disappoint reporters when he spoke at Local 890's union hall. The Silver City Daily Press quoted him as saying: "The International Union is not forgetting that your fight is tied up with the big question of peace. If there is a war and the atom bomb is dropped, your working conditions will not be important."

=== Legal events ===
District Judge Marshall made his injunction against the union permanent. Witt's strategy was to appeal the decision to a higher court. When Marshall handed down his decision, the negotiating committee walked out of the courtroom, and Marshall cited them with contempt of court. New arbitration efforts in subsequent days again proved fruitless. Local 890 said it would accept any other contract they had (Peru, Asarco, and Kennecott). Empire Zinc said the union's position amounted to new demands and rejected it. Local 890 turned to demonstrations and sit-down protests at the Sheriff's office and the Daily Press's offices. Empire offered half-pay to any worker who was willing to attempt breaking through the picket lines, which led to daily clashes between strike breakers and pickets. Women pickets resorted to rocks and ground chile pepper to bruise and blind the special deputies and strike breakers.

With state police guarding the courtroom, District Judge Marshall levied fines of $4,000 on both the local and international unions, and sentenced members of the negotiating committee to 90 days in jail. Marshall told them that he would suspend half the fines and all of the jail terms if the union would clear the road, but he didn't expect that to happen, so he immediately met with Grant County Bar Association President Charles Royall to draft a letter to Governor Mechem, asking him to impose martial law. Mechem responded that he would if necessary. Local 890 organized a convoy of over 300 cars, escorted by the state police, to the Grant County Courthouse in Silver City, where a large crowd listened to union leaders call for a continuing struggle and denounce the request for martial law. Local officials again appealed to Mechem to bring in the National Guard, but State Police Chief Joseph Roach and Captain John Bradford insisted that they could keep the peace. Governor Mechem was also receiving advice and information from a close friend who was an FBI agent investigating Local 890. Mechem adopted the FBI's opinion that Jencks incited the miners to strike, but he did not want to take a position that would be interpreted by Hispanic workers as antiunion because he understood that they were strongly committed to the strike. "Jencks had the ball there for quite some time and wasn't able to do anything with it," explained Mechem. "We were just hoping it would probably die a natural death; and, as a result, would lose a lot of its force as far as enhancing the position of the Communist Party or Jencks himself." Mechem therefore ordered state police officers to replace the special deputies patrolling the picket lines, but only to keep the peace, not to enforce the injunction. Mechem then addressed county residents in a radio broadcast on KSIL, a local station. He made thinly veiled references to communists, and stressed the importance of zinc production for the war effort, but he did not criticize either Local 890 or Empire Zinc, and offered to mediate the dispute. Empire remained silent on the Governor's offer of mediation, even though Local 890 immediately accepted his offer.

Chief Roach and Captain Bradford of the NM State Police played an important role in Mechem's approach to the strike and the subsequent interpretation and execution of it. They reassured strikers that they would not escort strikebreakers into the plant or prevent pickets from occupying the road. When clashes occurred, Bradford would secretly meet with union leaders to reiterate that maintaining the status quo depended on the avoidance of violence. The strikers appreciated Bradford's even-handed approach, and peace prevailed while the state police patrolled the picket lines. In a 1977 interview, Bradford stated that "public sentiment is, and was back then, 'to heck with the strikers'.... The deputies were causing trouble; we didn't need them. We did not try to enforce the court orders, leaving this to the sheriff....We were aware of the communist affiliation...but it was not a case of espionage or sabotage; it was just an upheaval in the...community."

Governor Mechem's call for negotiations eventually brought New Jersey Zinc's vice president of employee relations to personally meet with the union. IUMMSW's executive board, headed by Travis, conducted negotiations instead of Local 890. Travis was desperate for a settlement, again proposed arbitration, and hinted at concessions, but could get no cooperation from New Jersey Zinc. Jencks and Velasquez objected to Travis' soft line but were overruled. Many in Local 890 were unhappy about IUMMSW's defeatist attitude toward the strike, and the sidelining of Jencks. When Gov. Mechem learned that negotiations had left the parties in a stalemate, he withdrew state police from the picket lines, and declined to call for more negotiations. As soon as state officers left, Empire resumed attacks on the picket lines, and hired two particularly aggressive special deputies, Marvin Mosely and Robert Capshaw, to organize daily skirmishes with the women pickets. Foy and Goforth publicly criticized the state police and called for more special deputies. State Police Chief Joe Roach responded: "if conditions again get out of hand, it can in all probability be directly chargeable to the sheriff and district attorney, and this department would rather have no hand in it."

=== August 23 incident ===
Clashes between special deputies and the women pickets occurred daily in August, 1951, culminating in the most serious violence of the strike on August 23. The previous day, the company's bookkeeper brushed union representative Bob Hollowwa with his car when driving through the picket line. In response, pickets nearly destroyed the bookkeeper's car. That evening, fifteen Empire employees met with Sheriff Goforth and made plans to attack the south picket line on the following morning. Goforth said he would back them with at least 20 deputies, but was able to recruit only 10 for the confrontation. Most of Empire's employees were armed. Opposing them were 75 women, men, and children. Goforth's force waited for almost an hour while Goforth argued with the pickets. Goforth finally told the pickets that the road was public and they had the right to drive through the picket line. Hearing this, pickets jerked open the hood of the lead car and tore off its spark plug wires. The other two vehicles started their engines, but the pickets formed a human wall and pushed the car back until it hit the truck behind it. Rocks rained down on all three vehicles. Odell Hartless, driver of the truck, crouched down low in the cab and revved his engine. Suddenly the truck roared through the picket line, pushing the disabled car in front of it, running over three women who couldn't get out of the road in time. Marvin Marsh, in the stalled auto, scrambled back to the police cars after a fusillade of stones shattered his windshield and side windows. As pickets helped protect the injured women, others ran down the road toward the mine where the strikebreaker's truck had parked. Someone in the truck yelled at the advancing men to stop; the driver's son, Carlyon Hartless, pulled out .45 pistol and fired five times toward the strikers, the bullets hitting a few feet in front of the approaching crowd. A former unionist, on leave from the Korean War, sagged to the ground, hit by a ricocheted bullet. Seeing this, the strikebreakers hastily retreated into the mine, accompanied by a deputy sheriff. The news flashed through the mining district, triggering a general strike, which shut down all unionized mines in the district by 10 A.M.. Soon, over 600 men formed a cordon around Empire's property.

Goforth immediately called Mechem and asked for help, but the Governor responded that he would wait for a report from Chief Roach of the state police. When the state police arrived on the scene that night, cars full of union members patrolled the perimeter of Empire's property and used loud speakers to excoriate the armed men who had set up defenses in a few houses at the center of Empire's property. Shortly after midnight, a businessman in Silver City, who was a union supporter, arranged a meeting between union representative Hollowwa and Chief Roach. Hollowwa then called a meeting of the men who were besieging the mine. They agreed to accept Roach's plan to escort Empire's employees out of the property.

Empire Zinc's management claimed that it did not know of the plan to attack the strike line, but a labor relations manager for New Jersey Zinc, David Peiffer, had arrived at the mine shortly before the attack began, and stood along with Empire Zinc's mill superintendent, Clarence Snell, taking pictures when the attack occurred. Those dramatic pictures are preserved in District Court records. On the following morning, Empire ran a full-page ad in the Daily Press under the heading, "What Happens When A Mob Runs Wild?". Chief Roach reestablished state police control, and advised Empire Zinc's employees not to approach picket lines. Peace returned with the state police presence. A previously planned national strike by the IUMMSW overshadowed the Empire Zinc strike for the next two weeks, until President Truman invoked the emergency injunctive powers he held under the Taft–Hartley Act and forced a return to work. Little was gained by the national strike, which included mines organized by the United Steelworkers. IUMMSW increasingly came under fire as questions were raised about the motives for its strike, even though the Steelworkers Union called a national strike at the same time. The Daily Press carried many articles and editorials, accusing IUMMSW and Local 890 of "Moscow-inspired" subversion. Meanwhile, Empire Zinc gave full pay to workers who organized vigilante" law and order" groups. Sheriff Goforth's response was to offer to organize a sheriff's posse to help him police the strike. Local businesses who advertised on the local radio station, KSIL, forced the radio station to cancel Local 890's bi-weekly radio program. Both Jencks and his wife, also an activist, were attacked and injured in separate incidents. In Jencks case, the punishment for his attacker was a one-dollar fine. Empire took advantage of the growing unpopularity of Local 890 to order a return to work, and the state police allowed nonunion workers to return to work via a dirt road southwest of the main picket line. The union, worried by the threat of vigilante attacks, did not fight the reopening.

=== Late 1951 ===
By early October, the Steelworkers Union brought in organizers to Grant County, who called themselves the Grant County Organization for the Defeat of Communism. The Steelworkers Union argued that it could provide better pay and working conditions than Local 890 had obtained for local miners, but it had not achieved significantly superior results in its negotiations with mining companies in the West. Its appeal to Local 890's membership was also limited because the Steelworkers brushed aside racial issues (as it had done in the South with Blacks), so its appeal was limited among Hispanic miners. Nevertheless, the scores of advertisements the Steelworkers Union ran in the Daily Press, contrasting "God, Truth, and Democracy" to the "godless, lying, and dictatorial IUMMSW, hurt Local 890.

As Local 890 became more unpopular with the public, the state and local courts increasingly pressured the union with jailings, fines, and jail bonds. By the end of 1951, the union had to provide several hundred thousand dollars in bonds to be able to appeal a growing number of court decisions against it. Almost every car, lot, and home owned by union members had been pledged in property bonds. The Executive Board of IUMMSW fired Hollowwa, who was very popular among the rank and file members of Local 890, for not following their directives. The Ladies Auxiliary, the Steward Council, and the Kennecottt unit sent telegrams to IUMMSW's executive board, accusing it of disrupting the union, and comparing the executive board to metal corporation bosses. Enthusiasm waned among pickets, and fewer showed up for picket duty.

In mid-December, 1951, the culminating blow came when Governor Mechem ordered state police to assume complete control and enforce the injunction against blocking the roads into Empire Zinc's property. In the Silver City Enterprise, a paper that had sympathized with the miners throughout the strike, the editor wrote: "We still condone and smirk at the use of power and wealth, both private and state, to crush... opposition." Shortly after Mechem's order, Empire asked for and received another contempt charge against the union. Judge Marshall planned to fine IUMMSW $2,000 a day (Empire's claimed profit potential) going back to the original contempt judgement on July 23, 1951. At the same time, Empire began to bring in workers from Texas, Nebraska, Missouri, and Oklahoma to restart the mine. The tight labor market during the Korean War prevented Empire from obtaining all the workers it wanted, but the outlook was grim for the union.

Surprisingly, as Local 890's position seemed ready to collapse, Empire agreed to participate in a new bargaining session in response to a request from Local 890 for arbitration by the Conciliation Service. Richard Berresford, vice-president of New Jersey Zinc, later testified before the House Labor Committee that "We are not trying to destroy this union. We are trying to give it proper leadership." Many in Local 890 believed Empire Zinc preferred to be able to deal with a weakened IUMMSW rather than deal with the more powerful Steelworkers Union.

=== 1952 ===
The 25th negotiating session between Local 890 and Empire Zinc was held in El Paso, Texas, at the Hilton Hotel on January 21, 1952. Local 890 gave up pay for all time spent underground and paid holidays, but Empire increased pay rates to more closely approximate those of other mining companies in the district. By giving an increase in hourly wages, instead of benefits, like a 40 hour week, it could claim that it paid the highest wages in the district, which may have helped it compete for scarce workers and keep the competing Steelworkers Union at bay. Empire also agreed to negotiate wage rates for new jobs, a sickness and accident insurance program, a modest pension plan, a company-paid life insurance policy of $2500, a three-week vacation for employees with 25 years of service, and the right to use grievance procedures for new employees. Empire Zinc still refused to bargain over housing conditions, and demanded that the strikers double their housing payments until the company collected all delinquent rent. Nevertheless, Empire notified workers shortly after they returned to work that indoor plumbing, hot water, and baths would be provided to Hispanic housing. The message: this is a gift, not a concession. The most serious loss for the union in the negotiations came when Empire refused to drop court proceedings. In September 1952, Marshall handed down 90-day jail sentences for union leaders (Goforth held Jencks in solitary confinement) and fines totaling $38,000 for Local 890 and the IUMMSW. When presenting the contract to Local 890's membership, Travis said the contract was a victory. Witt said it was as good as the membership made it. Pablo Montoya was more sober, calling for a pilgrimage to a poor Hispanic village, where all of the strikers could "feel honorable with a clear heart and conscience."

== Aftermath ==
The following year, the movie Salt of the Earth was filmed in Silver City, with American actor Will Geer and Mexican actress Rosaura Revueltas in leading roles. Local miners and their families played most of the other parts. The movie offered a fictionalized version of the strike, with a company named "Delaware Zinc" operating out of "Zinctown," New Mexico. Police harassment continued during filming, and the day after the filmmakers left town, Local 890's union hall burned in a fire of mysterious origin.

Directed by Herbert Biberman of the Hollywood Ten blacklist, written by Michael Wilson, and produced by Paul Jarrico (both of whom had also been blacklisted), Salt of the Earth was as controversial as the strike itself. Efforts to stop the production and distribution of the film were intense and generally limited its showings to art theaters, and universities.

Salt of the Earth won the International Grand Prize of the Paris Academy of Film in 1955. Due in part to the efforts of activists in the 1960s and 1970s, the film was added to the Library of Congress's National Film Registry in 1992 because of the cultural and historical significance of its depiction of the Empire Zinc strike .
