= One Way Ticket (1935 film) =

1935 film by Herbert Biberman

- Directed by: Herbert J. Biberman
- Written by: Joseph Anthony; Oliver H. P. Garrett; Grover Jones; Vincent Lawrence (screenplay); Ethel Turner (novel)
- Starring: Lloyd Nolan; Peggy Conklin; Walter Connolly
- Cinematography: Henry Freulich
- Edited by: John Rawlins
- Production company: Columbia Pictures
- Distributed by: Columbia Pictures
- Release date: November 25, 1935
- Running time: 72 minutes
- Country: United States
- Language: English

One Way Ticket is a 1935 American crime film directed by Herbert Biberman starring Lloyd Nolan, Peggy Conklin and Walter Connolly. The film is based on the 1934 novel One-Way Ticket by Ethel Turner.

It was the directorial debut of Biberman, a playwright and theatre director of Marxist political leanings; following some theatrical success in New York, he signed a two-picture deal with Columbia in 1934, and it was followed by Meet Nero Wolfe in 1936.

== Plot ==
A man becomes a robber following the authorities' failure to convict a corrupt banker.

== Cast ==
- Lloyd Nolan as Jerry
- Peggy Conklin as Ronnie
- Walter Connolly as Captain Bill Bourne
- Edith Fellows as Ellen
- Gloria Shea as Willa
- Nana Bryant as Mrs. Bourne
- Thurston Hall as Mr. Ritchie
- George McKay as Martin
- Robert Middlemass as Bender
- Willie Fung as Wing
- Jack Rube Clifford as Charlie
- James Flavin as Ed

== Critical reception ==
Writing for The Spectator in 1936, Graham Greene gave the film a mildly good review, judging it to be well acted and describing it as "criticiz[ing] as well as thrill[ing]". Greene drew particular attention to the prison break scene as the film's "one excellent sequence".
