= Rebecca's Daughters =

- Directed by: Karl Francis
- Written by: Guy Jenkin; Dylan Thomas
- Produced by: Chris Sievernich
- Starring: Peter O'Toole; Joely Richardson; Paul Rhys; Ray Gravell
- Cinematography: Russ Walker
- Edited by: Roy Sharman
- Music by: Rachel Portman
- Production companies: Astra; BBC Wales; British Screen; Delta Film; Rebecca's Daughters Ltd
- Release date: 5 March 1992
- Running time: 95 minutes
- Countries: United Kingdom; Germany
- Language: English
- Budget: £2.86 million
- Box office: £7,000 (UK)

Rebecca's Daughters is a 1992 Welsh and German comedy adventure film about the Rebecca Riots, directed by Karl Francis.

The film was based on a story by Dylan Thomas. The screenplay was originally written in 1948 by Thomas, and was published in book form; 44 years elapsed before it was finally made into a film, which is the longest period of this kind on record. There is some evidence that Thomas' screenplay was derived in part from the riots that occurred in the village of Pontarddulais in south Wales.

== Cast ==
- Peter O'Toole as Lord Sarn
- Joely Richardson as Rhiannon
- Paul Rhys as Anthony Raine
- Ray Gravell as Jonah
