= José Revueltas =

Mexican writer, essayist, and political activist (1914–1976)

José Revueltas Sánchez (November 20, 1914 in Santiago Papasquiaro, Durango – April 14, 1976 in Mexico City) was a Mexican writer, essayist, and political activist. He was part of an important artistic family that included his siblings Silvestre (composer), Fermín (painter) and Rosaura (actress).

== Biography ==
=== Early life ===
José Revueltas Sánchez was born on November 20, 1914, in Santiago Papasquiaro, Durango. In 1920, the family relocated to Mexico City, first to the colonia Roma and then to colonia Doctores. He studied at the Colegio Alemán until the fourth grade and finished his primary education in public school. The family entered an economic crisis after the death of his father In 1923. He left school in 1925, but continued through self-education in the Biblioteca Nacional.

=== Political activism ===
Revueltas joined the Mexican Communist Party in 1928, but was expelled in 1943 for his criticisms of the organization's bureaucratic practices and for his critique of the Mexican Left, Mexico: Ensayo de un proletariado sin cabeza (Essay About a Headless Proletariat).

He founded the Liga Espartaquista (Spartacist League) and the Partido Popular Socialista (Popular Socialist Party, or PPS), from which he also was expelled for questioning and criticizing the Left.

=== Imprisonment ===
Authorities arrested Revueltas for his participation in a political "riot" in the Zócalo in 1929. He was accused of sedition and rioting and sent to the maximum-security penal colony Islas Marías. He was freed on bail after six months. He was again incarcerated in Islas Marías from July to November 1932, and again in 1934 for organizing a strike among agrarian peasants in Camarón, Nuevo León.

He was again imprisoned in 1958 for his participation in the Railwaymen's Movement.

In 1968 he was accused of being the "intellectual author" of the student movement that culminated in the Tlatelolco massacre, so he was arrested and sent to the Palacio de Lecumberri prison (a.k.a. The Black Palace), where he wrote one of his more popular books: El apando (The Punishment Cell) (A. Revueltas 1998; Valle, Alvárez Garín, and J. Revueltas 1970).

Translated from the Spanish Wikipedia article.

=== Death and memorial ===
Revueltas died on April 14, 1976, at the age of 61. The official cause of death was post-cardiac arrest.

A memorial for Revueltas was held at the Universidad Nacional Autónoma de México. Secretary of Public Education Victor Bravo Ahuja attended on behalf of President Luis Echeverría, Ahuja was encouraged to leave by Professor Martín Dosal, who had been imprisoned with Revueltas.

President Andrés Manuel López Obrador announced in 2021 that the former prison where Revueltas was held would be rehabilitated as the environmental and cultural education center "Muros de Agua-José Revueltas".

== Writings ==
- Los muros de agua (1941)
- El luto humano (1943) Published in English as Human Mourning and also as The Stone Knife
- Dios en la tierra (1944)
- Los días terrenales (1949)
- Los errores (1964)
- El apando (1969) Published in English as The Hole
- México 68: Juventud Y Revolución (1968–1972)

== Sources ==
- Revueltas, Andrea. 1998. "José Revueltas y el 68. (escritor mexicano)." Siempre! 45, no. 2363 (October): 58–60.
- Revueltas, Rosaura. 1980. Los Revueltas: Biografía de una familia. México: Editorial Grijalbo. ISBN 968-419-111-1
- Sáinz, Gustavo, et al. 1977. Conversaciones con José Revueltas. Introduction by Jorge Ruffinelli, bibliography of works by and about José Revueltas by Marilyn R. Frankenthaler. (Cuadernos de texto crítico 3). Veracruz: Universidad Veracruzana, Centro de Investigaciones Lingüístico-Literarias.
- Slick, Sam L. 1983. José Revueltas. Edited by Luis Davila. Twayne's world authors series 683. Boston: Twayne Publishers.
- Valle, Eduardo, Raúl Álvarez Garín, and José Revueltas. 1970. Los procesos de México 68; tiempo de hablar. México: Editorial Estudiantes.
