= No Time to Marry =

1938 film by Harry Lachman

- Directed by: Harry Lachman
- Written by: Paul Gallico; Paul Jarrico
- Produced by: Nat Perrin; William Perlberg
- Starring: Richard Arlen; Mary Astor; Lionel Stander
- Cinematography: Allen G. Siegler
- Edited by: Otto Meyer
- Music by: Morris Stoloff
- Production company: Columbia Pictures
- Distributed by: Columbia Pictures
- Release date: February 5, 1938
- Running time: 63 minutes
- Country: United States
- Language: English

No Time to Marry is a 1938 American comedy film directed by Harry Lachman and starring Richard Arlen, Mary Astor and Lionel Stander.

== Cast ==
- Richard Arlen as Perry Brown
- Mary Astor as Kay McGowan
- Lionel Stander as Al Vogel
- Virginia Dale as Eleanor Winthrop
- Marjorie Gateson as Mrs. Pettensall
- Thurston Hall as Pettensall
- Arthur Loft as Wyatt Blake
- Jay Adler as Hess
- Matt McHugh as Abernathy
- Paul Hurst as Sergeant
- George Humbert as Buenocasa

== Bibliography ==
- Goble, Alan. The Complete Index to Literary Sources in Film. Walter de Gruyter, 1999.
