= Gale Sondergaard =

American actress (1899–1985)

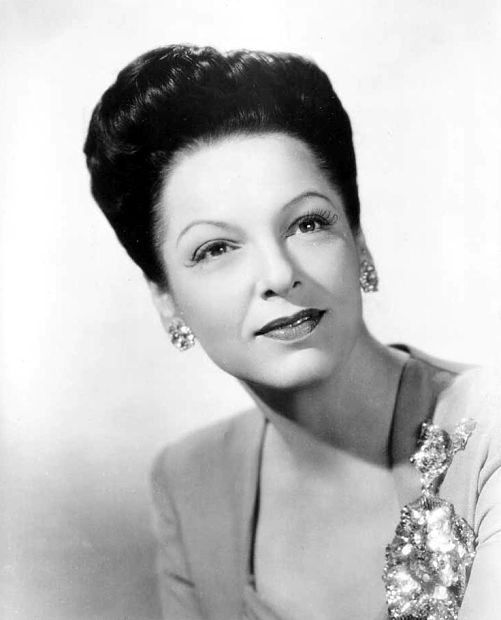
- Sondergaard in 1940
- Born: Edith Holm Sondergaard; February 15, 1899; Litchfield, Minnesota, U.S.
- Died: August 14, 1985 (aged 86); Los Angeles, California, U.S.
- Occupation: Actress
- Years active: 1936–1983
- Spouses: Neill O'Malley (m. 1922; div. 1930) Herbert J. Biberman (m. 1930; died 1971)
- Children: 2

Gale Sondergaard (born Edith Holm Sondergaard; February 15, 1899 – August 14, 1985) was an American actress.

Sondergaard began her acting career in theater and progressed to films in 1936. She was the first recipient of the Academy Award for Best Supporting Actress for her film debut in Anthony Adverse (1936). She regularly had supporting roles in films during the late 1930s and 1940s, including The Cat and the Canary (1939), The Mark of Zorro (1940) and The Letter (1940). For her role in Anna and the King of Siam (1946), she was nominated for her second Best Supporting Actress Academy Award. After 1949, her screen work came to an abrupt end for 20 years, primarily due to the Hollywood blacklist.

Married to director Herbert Biberman, Sondergaard supported him when he was accused of communism and imprisoned as one of the Hollywood Ten in the early 1950s. She moved with Biberman to New York City and worked in theater. She only returned to occasional acting in film and television beginning in 1969, when she moved back to Los Angeles. She died from cerebrovascular thrombosis in 1985.

== Early life ==
Sondergaard was born in Litchfield, Minnesota, to Danish immigrants, Hans Sondergaard (born Hans Tjellesen Schmidt Søndergaard) and Anna Kirstine Søndergaard (née Holm). Her father taught at the University of Minnesota, where she was a drama student.

== Stage and film career ==
=== Until the late 1940s ===
Sondergaard studied acting at the Minneapolis School of Dramatic Arts before joining the John Keller Shakespeare Company. She later toured North America in productions of Hamlet, Julius Caesar, The Merchant of Venice and Macbeth. After joining the Theatre Guild, she began performing on the New York stage.

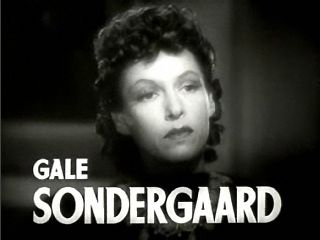
in the trailer for Dramatic School (1938)

She made her first film appearance in Anthony Adverse (1936) as the scheming social climber Faith Paleologus, for which she won the Academy Award for Best Supporting Actress. Her career flourished during the 1930s, notably as the steadfastly loyal wife of disgraced innocent Alfred Dreyfus in The Life of Emile Zola starring Paul Muni (1937).

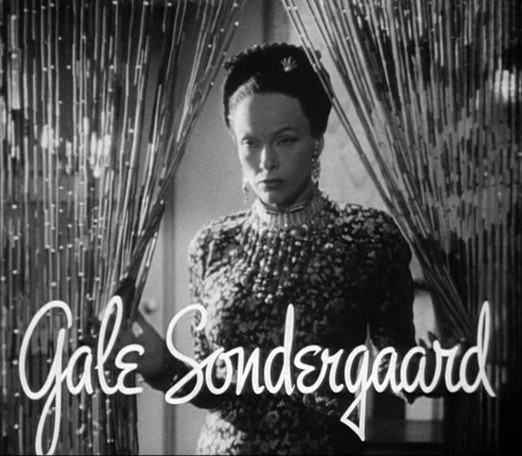
in the trailer for The Letter (1940)

During pre-production of Metro-Goldwyn-Mayer's classic The Wizard of Oz (1939), an early idea was to have the Wicked Witch of the West portrayed as a slinky, glamorous villainess in a black, sequined costume, inspired by the Evil Queen in Walt Disney's Snow White and the Seven Dwarfs (1937). Sondergaard was cast and photographed for two wardrobe tests, both of which survive—one as a glamorous witch, and another as a conventionally ugly one. After the decision was made to have an ugly witch, Sondergaard, reluctant to wear the disfiguring makeup and fearing it could damage her career, withdrew from the role, and it went to veteran character actress Margaret Hamilton.

Sondergaard was cast as the sultry and slinky Tylette, a magically humanized but devious cat, in The Blue Bird (1940), and played the exotic, sinister Eurasian wife in The Letter (1940) starring Bette Davis. She had a supporting role in The Spider Woman (aka Sherlock Holmes and the Spider Woman, 1943), part of the Universal cycle, followed by the non-canonical The Spider Woman Strikes Back (1946), also for Universal.

She received a second Academy Award nomination for her role as the king's principal wife in Anna and the King of Siam (1946).

=== House Un-American Activities Committee ===
Sondergaard's career suffered irreparable damage during the United States Congressional HUAC Red Scare of the early 1950s when her husband was accused of being a communist and named as one of the Hollywood Ten. With her career stalled, she supported her husband during the production of Salt of the Earth (1954). They sold their home in Hollywood shortly after they completed Salt of the Earth and moved to New York where Sondergaard was able to work in theater.

=== Later career ===
In 1969, she appeared in an off-Broadway one-woman show, Woman. She resumed her career in film and television around the same time. Her revived career extended into the early 1980s.

== Personal life ==
Her younger sister Hester Sondergaard was also an actress who featured in Seeds of Freedom (1943), The Naked City (1948), Jigsaw (1949) and The Big Break (1953).

Sondergaard married actor Neill O'Malley in 1922; they divorced in 1930. On May 15, 1930, in Philadelphia, Pennsylvania, she married director Herbert Biberman, who was then associated with the Theatre Guild Acting Company. He became a film director and died in 1971. They adopted two children, Joan Kirstine Biberman (married name Campos, 1940) and Daniel Hans Biberman.

Following several strokes, Sondergaard died from cerebral vascular thrombosis in the Motion Picture and Television Hospital in Woodland Hills, Los Angeles, California in 1985, aged 86. She had been admitted to the hospital in 1982.

== Acting credits ==
=== Stage ===
Opening date	Closing date	Title	Role	Theatre	Refs
Oct 08, 1928	Nov 1928	Faust	The Witch	Guild Theatre	
Nov 19, 1928	Jan 1929	Major Barbara	Sarah Undershaft, Lady Britomart's daughter	Guild Theatre	
Oct 7, 1929	Nov 1929	Karl and Anna	Marie's sister	Guild Theatre	
Dec 17, 1929	Feb 1930	Red Rust	Nina	Martin Beck Theatre	
May 11, 1931	May 23, 1931	Alison's House	Elsa - Replacement	Ritz Theatre	
Feb 21, 1933	March 1933	American Dream	Lydia Kimball, The First Play, 1650	Guild Theatre	
May 17, 1934	Jul 1934	Invitation to a Murder	Lorinda Channing	Theatre Masque	
Nov 6, 1933	Nov 1933	Doctor Monica	Anna	Playhouse Theatre	
Dec 19, 1940	Dec 28, 1940	Cue for Passion	Frances Chapman	Royale Theatre	
Apr 02, 1980	April 26, 1980	Goodbye Fidel	Prudencia	Ambassador Theatre	

=== Film and television ===
Year	Title	Role	Notes	Refs
1936	Anthony Adverse	Faith Paleologus	First winner of Academy Award for Best Supporting Actress	
1937	Maid of Salem	Martha Harding		
1937	Seventh Heaven	Nana, Diane's Sister		
1937	The Life of Emile Zola	Lucie Dreyfus		
1938	Lord Jeff	Doris Clandon		
1938	Dramatic School	Madame Therese Charlot		
1939	Never Say Die	Juno Marko		
1939	Juarez	Empress Eugenie		
1939	Sons of Liberty	Rachel Salomon	short	
1939	The Cat and the Canary	Miss Lu		
1939	The Llano Kid	Lora Travers		
1940	The Blue Bird	Tylette (the cat)		
1940	The Mark of Zorro	Inez Quintero		
1940	The Letter	Mrs. Hammond		
1941	The Black Cat	Abigail Doone		
1941	Paris Calling	Colette		
1942	My Favorite Blonde	Madame Stephanie Runick		
1942	Enemy Agents Meet Ellery Queen	Mrs. Van Dorn		
1943	A Night to Remember	Mrs. Devoe		
1943	Appointment in Berlin	Gretta Van Leyden		
1943	Isle of Forgotten Sins	Marge Willison		
1943	The Strange Death of Adolf Hitler	Anna Huber		
1943	Crazy House	Herself	uncredited	
1944	The Spider Woman	Adrea Spedding	aka Sherlock Holmes and the Spider Woman	
1944	Follow the Boys	Herself	uncredited	
1944	The Invisible Man's Revenge	Lady Irene Herrick		
1944	Christmas Holiday	Mrs. Monette		
1944	Gypsy Wildcat	Rhoda		
1944	The Climax	Luise		
1944	Enter Arsène Lupin	Bessie Seagrave		
1946	The Spider Woman Strikes Back	Zenobia Dollard		
1946	Night in Paradise	Queen Attossa		
1946	Anna and the King of Siam	Lady Thiang	Nominated — Academy Award for Best Supporting Actress	
1946	The Time of Their Lives	Emily		
1947	Pirates of Monterey	Señorita De Sola		
1947	Road to Rio	Catherine Vail		
1949	East Side, West Side	Nora Kernan		
1969	Slaves	New Orleans lady		
1969	It Takes a Thief	Madame Olga Millard	episode: "The Scorpio Drop"	
1970	Get Smart	Hester Van Hooten	episode: "Rebecca of Funny-Folk Farm"	
1970	Tango		TV movie	
1970	The Best of Everything	Amanda Key	Regular; contract role	
1970	Savage Intruder	Leslie		
1971	Night Gallery	Abigail Moore	episode: "The Dark Boy"	
1971	The Bold Ones: The Lawyers	Mrs. Marley	episode: "The Letter of the Law"	
1973	The Cat Creature	Hester Black	TV movie	
1974	Medical Center	Myra	episode: "Adults Only"	
1974	Nakia	Bert	episode: "The Quarry"	
1974	Police Story	Marge White	episode: "A World Full of Hurt"	
1976	Ryan's Hope	Marguerite Beaulac	6 episodes	
1976	The Return of a Man Called Horse	Elk Woman		
1976	Pleasantville	Ora		
1976	Hollywood on Trial	Herself	documentary	
1977	Visions	Ora Drummond	Episode: "Pleasantville"	
1978	Centennial	Aunt Augusta	TV miniseries	
1981	The Fall Guy	Mrs. Jackson	episode: "The Human Torch"	
1983	Echoes	Mrs. Edmunds		
