= Slaves (film) =

1969 American drama film

- Film poster
- Directed by: Herbert Biberman
- Written by: Herbert Biberman; John O. Killens; Alida Sherman
- Produced by: Philip Langner
- Starring: Stephen Boyd; Dionne Warwick; Ossie Davis
- Cinematography: Joseph C. Brun
- Edited by: Sidney Mayers
- Music by: Bobby Scott
- Production companies: Slaves Company; Theatre Guild; Walter Reade Organization
- Distributed by: Continental Distributing
- Release date: May 6, 1969
- Running time: 110 minutes
- Country: United States
- Language: English
- Budget: $1 million

Slaves is a 1969 American drama film co-written and directed by Herbert Biberman. The film stars Dionne Warwick (in her screen acting debut), Ossie Davis, and Stephen Boyd.

== Plot ==
Set in the 1850s Southern United States, the film follows Cassy and Luke, two black slaves who are sold to the sadistic plantation owner MacKay. He wants labor from the men and sex from the women. On this, he is determined to exploit both Cassy and Luke.

== Cast ==
- Dionne Warwick as Cassy
- Ossie Davis as Luke
- Stephen Boyd as MacKay
- Marilyn Clark as Mrs. Bennett
- Nancy Coleman as Mrs. Stillwell
- Julius Harris as Shadrach
- James Heath as Luther
- David Huddleston as Holland
- Eva Jessye as Julie
- Oscar Paul Jones as Zacharious
- Aldine King as Emmeline
- Robert Kya-Hill as Jericho
- Gale Sondergaard as New Orleans Lady
- Shepperd Strudwick as Mr. Stillwell
- Barbara Ann Teer as Esther

== Release ==
The film opened at the Hippodrome Theatre in Baltimore on May 6, 1969. It grossed $28,000 in its opening week. It was also entered into the 1969 Cannes Film Festival.

== Reception ==
It received negative reviews, but was one of Continental Distributing's highest-grossing films. Lou Cedrone of the Baltimore Evening Sun, believed that "'Slaves,' [...] is a strong film, one likely to inflame and maybe even enlighten. But it is also a very badly done film, and that's a pity because slavery, as it 'really was' in this country, is a story that should be told, but with much more finesse than is evident here". Cedrone added that the film "at times looks as though it might have been made during the silent era, so backward are the cutting, direction and framing."

Clifford Terry of the Chicago Tribune dubbed the film "a kind of 'Uncle Tom's Cabin Revisted'", opening his review by calling it "a horrendous box-office exploitation of a horrendous historical exploitation" and remarking that "everyone involved with the creation of this pitiful production deserves, at the minimum, a good, sound whupping." His successor, Gene Siskel, named the film as one of the worst to be released in 1969.

Bruce Vilanch of the Detroit Free Press called the film "a cheap, poorly-executed, thinly-veiled plea for black militancy", noting that "in Hollywood's former days it would have been called a 'heavy meller,' or melodrama gone sour, but in 1969 it is just a shade above sheer exploitation." He added:

Amazingly, the Theater Guild, which usually has an eye for good drama, is behind the thing, but Wednesday's huge audience at the Fox, almost entirely black, did not seem to be. They laughed at all the contrived, wordy dialogue, stooping good-versus-evil metaphor and intolerable message scenes.

Vilanch did, however, praise the performances of Davis and Warwick, the latter of whom was deemed "a very stylized singer who shows that her talents may not be confined to Burt Bacharach's arrangements."

Kathleen Carroll's review of the film in the New York Daily News contained simply five paragraphs:

"Slaves," at the Fine Arts, RKO and other theaters, may have been intended as a meaningful, fact-finding, study on the condition of the American slave.

But how can you take a movie seriously when it has lines so dreadful they are laughable (A sample: "Disgust makes you womanly.") and characters so stereotyped they belong on a Mississippi showboat—from the evil slave owner (Stephen Boyd) to the Christ-like slave (played with great solemnity by Ossie Davis).

What this is, is a ridiculously old-fashioned, incredibly amateurish bayou belt melodrama, nothing more, nothing less.

Thanks to a director who over-stages and drags out each scene, and a cameraman who lops off the tops of heads, it sinks to its death.

The combination of the two would drown any movie, no matter how well-intentioned. Only Dionne Warwick (Boyd's angry, alcoholic mistress who dresses African style) manages to keep her dignity intact and rise above it all.

in The New York Times, Vincent Canby described the film as "a kind of cinematic carpetbagging project in which some contemporary movie-makers have raided the antebellum South and attempted to impose on it their own attitudes that will explain 1969 black militancy. The result, which opened here yesterday at the DeMille and neighborhood theaters, is a pre-fab 'Uncle Tom's Cabin,' set in an 1850 Mississippi where everybody—masters and slaves alike—talks as if he had been weaned, at best, on the Group Theater, and, at worst, on silent-movie titles." He added:

The movie, which was produced by the Theater Guild, is the first to be directed by Herbert J. Biberman, the blacklisted Hollywood director, since he made the controversial Salt of The Earth in 1954. Mr. Biberman is an intensely earnest propagandist, a man who has committed himself to working for good in his own way, which, unfortunately, does not include the making of good films. There is one, unequivocably pleasant thing about "Slaves," the brief appearance of Gale Sondergaard (Mrs. Biberman). She has a terrible line to say ("How can you support this eee-vill?" she asks a slave-owner) but it still recalled many memorable appearances, in earlier, happier times.

== See also ==
- List of American films of 1969
- List of films featuring slavery
