= Edward Biberman =

American painter (1904–1986)

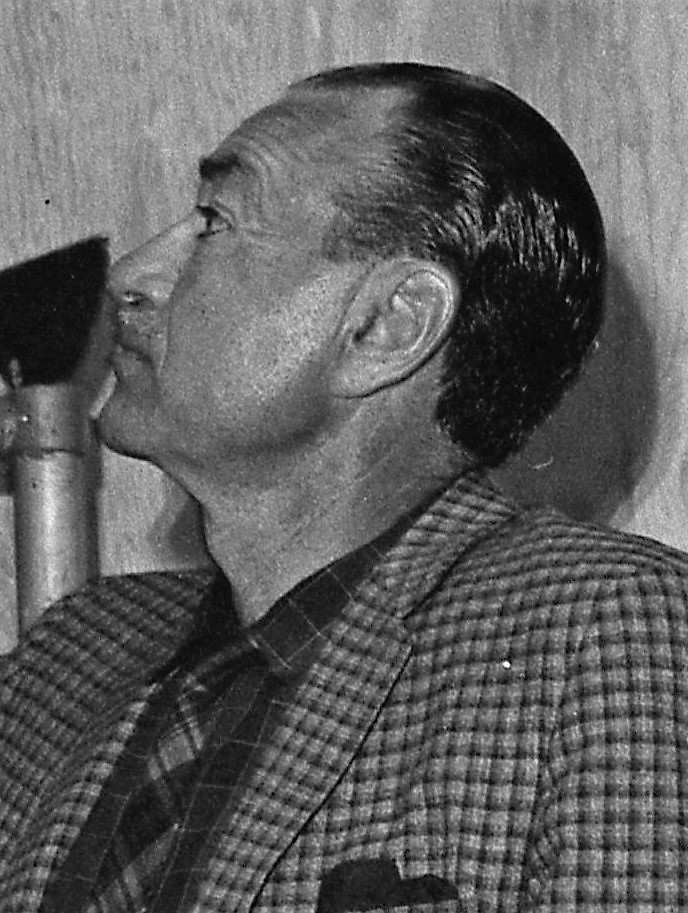
- Biberman in 1965
- Born: Edward Biberman; 23 October 1904; Philadelphia, Pennsylvania, U.S.
- Died: January 27, 1986 (aged 81); Los Angeles, California, U.S.
- Education: Pennsylvania Academy of Fine Arts
- Known for: Painter
- Movement: Modernism
- Awards: Lambert Fund Purchase Prize

Edward Biberman (October 23, 1904 – January 27, 1986) was an American artist active in the mid-twentieth century. His work ranged from stylised portraits to history-inspired murals, and drew on the emerging urban landscapes of southern California, and on current events such as the Great Depression, the Second World War, and labour unrest.

== Life and career ==
Biberman was born into a prosperous Philadelphia family of Russian Jewish immigrants, and studied economics at the Wharton School. His later studies at the Pennsylvania Academy of Fine Arts, followed by three years in Paris, led to his decision to become a full-time artist. He lived in New York City from 1929 to 1936, where he came into contact with the Mexican muralists Diego Rivera, David Alfaro Siqueiros, and José Clemente Orozco; thanks to their influence, Biberman became a champion of public murals. In 1930, he was named one of the "46 Under 35" younger artists featured in a Museum of Modern Art exhibition.

In 1931, he lived for the summer in a Navajo settlement at Monument Valley, where his work focused on both the Navajo people and on their desert surroundings. His experiences there inspired in him a love of the southwestern United States. Following his arrival in Los Angeles in 1936, the city which would inspire some of his best-known work, he decided to move there permanently. By 1940, the Spring Street lobby of the newly constructed U.S. Post Office and Courthouse in downtown Los Angeles featured the federally commissioned mural Los Angeles Prehistoric Spanish Colonial, by Biberman. In 1965, when the Post Office was moved and the Courthouse remodeled, all murals were removed and placed in storage. Fortunately, Los Angeles Prehistoric Spanish Colonial was returned to the building's Spring Street lobby in 2003.

Ironically, this is the same Courthouse in which The House Un-American Activities Committee held the first of the infamous Hollywood Blacklist hearings. As a result of refusing to cooperate with the committee, his brother, Herbert Biberman, a screenwriter and director, and nine others were accused of contempt of congress. They became known as the Hollywood Ten. Ultimately, both of the Biberman brothers, their wives, and other members of their circle were accused of being Communists during the course of the HUAC hearings. Though initially popular for the clean lines and crisp colours of his work, his career never recovered from the blow it received during this time. Despite this, he lived in Los Angeles for the rest of his life.

Preceding Biberman's move to California, the artist became intrigued by the allure of the Southwest desert. In the early 1930s he acquainted himself with Georgia O'Keeffe and John Marin. Like O’Keeffe, Biberman painters modified realist painting by applying a modernist aesthetic. After moving to Los Angeles, Biberman became an essential part of the mid-century Los Angeles art scene. He often painted the figure as a way of addressing issues of race, immigration, labor, and ensuing social inequality around the world. His painting of The Biafran Child has become a symbol for the future of our children lest we mend our ways and was under consideration for a commemorative stamp for the benefit of the homeless children of Haiti.

Biberman wrote two books about his paintings, The Best Untold and Time and Circumstance. From 1938 to 1950, he taught at the Art Center School in Los Angeles, California (now known as Art Center College of Design in Pasadena,) and lectured widely on art subjects for the University Extension of UCLA. In the 1960s, Biberman hosted television programs on art, including Dialogues in Art from 1967 to 1968.

Biberman was married for 51 years to Sonja Dahl Biberman (1910–2007), an artist in her own right. His great-nephew is Jeremy Strick, the former director of the Museum of Contemporary Art, Los Angeles, now director of the Nasher Sculpture Center in Dallas. Edward Biberman died of cancer in 1986.

== Exhibitions and awards ==
Over the course of his career, Biberman exhibited his works at more than 35 solo exhibitions in Philadelphia, New York, Boston, Chicago, Paris, Berlin, and California. His works were also displayed at the American Artists' Congress (1936), the San Francisco Art Association (1937), the Golden Gate International Exposition (1939), the California Art Club (1943), and the Whitney Museum (1953). His never before seen painting entitled "The Biafran Child" is under consideration as a stamp for the benefit of the homeless children of Haiti and is to be housed at the original Hospital Albert Schweitzer, at Lambaréné in Gabon, Africa. The donation is to remain unnamed. His paintings are now to be found in the permanent collections of the Museum of the Pennsylvania Academy of the Fine Arts, Philadelphia, and the Museum of Fine Arts, Houston, Texas. His life-size portraits of singer Lena Horne and author Dashiell Hammett form part of the Smithsonian's National Portrait Gallery. Among his awards are the Lambert Fund Purchase Prize.
