= The Hollywood Ten =

1950 documentary film by John Berry

- Promotional image
- Directed by: John Berry
- Written by: John Berry
- Produced by: Paul Jarrico
- Narrated by: Colin Chandler
- Release date: June 1, 1950 (United States)
- Running time: 15 minutes
- Country: United States
- Language: English

The Hollywood Ten is a 1950 American short documentary film. Shot in 16mm with a runtime of 15 minutes, it was created quickly to raise public awareness and legal funds for the ten screenwriters and directors who comprised the "Hollywood Ten". At the time of filming in April 1950, the ten blacklisted men were facing prison sentences for contempt of Congress stemming from their non-cooperation with the House Un-American Activities Committee (HUAC).

== Synopsis ==
The documentary begins with biographic profiles of each of the Ten. It then features them sitting at a long table where they, one by one, make a short speech denouncing McCarthyism and the chilling effect the Hollywood blacklist will have on the rights of all Americans.

The film was produced by Paul Jarrico and directed by John Berry. At first, Berry was reluctant to participate since he predicted (quite correctly as it turned out) that doing so would put him in serious political jeopardy. But, as he recalled in a 1995 interview, he was finally persuaded by the Hollywood Ten defense committee to be "a man of principle" and help create an effective defense document. He acknowledged in the interview that he was probably a good choice to direct:

I knew most of the Ten. They were all terribly nervous and upset. I think the choice was made because they felt I would be able to calm them down and get them through it, getting something from them on camera without their being too stiff-assed.

The documentary was banned from exhibition in American theaters, and the U.S. government pressured other countries to not show it. IMDb notes that the film "was first shown non-theatrically in meeting halls and even in the living rooms of private homes."

As Berry predicted, he became a blacklist target as soon as the documentary was completed. His fate was further sealed in April 1951 when Hollywood Ten member Edward Dmytryk asked to appear once more before the HUAC, this time as a cooperative witness, and named Berry as a Communist. Berry was named again the following month by director Frank Tuttle. The cascade of events set in motion by the documentary caused Berry to be subpoenaed by the HUAC and to flee to France.

The 15-minute film is available as an extra feature on the DVDs of Spartacus and Salt of the Earth. It has also been posted on YouTube.

== Featuring ==
- Alvah Bessie
- Herbert J. Biberman
- Lester Cole
- Edward Dmytryk
- Ring Lardner Jr.
- John Howard Lawson
- Albert Maltz
- Samuel Ornitz
- Adrian Scott
- Dalton Trumbo

== Later showings ==
In 1993, during the first "Carte Blanche" film series at the Museum of Modern Art in New York City, The Hollywood Ten was shown along with John Berry's 1951 film He Ran All the Way.
