= Rosaura Revueltas =

Mexican actress (1910–1996)

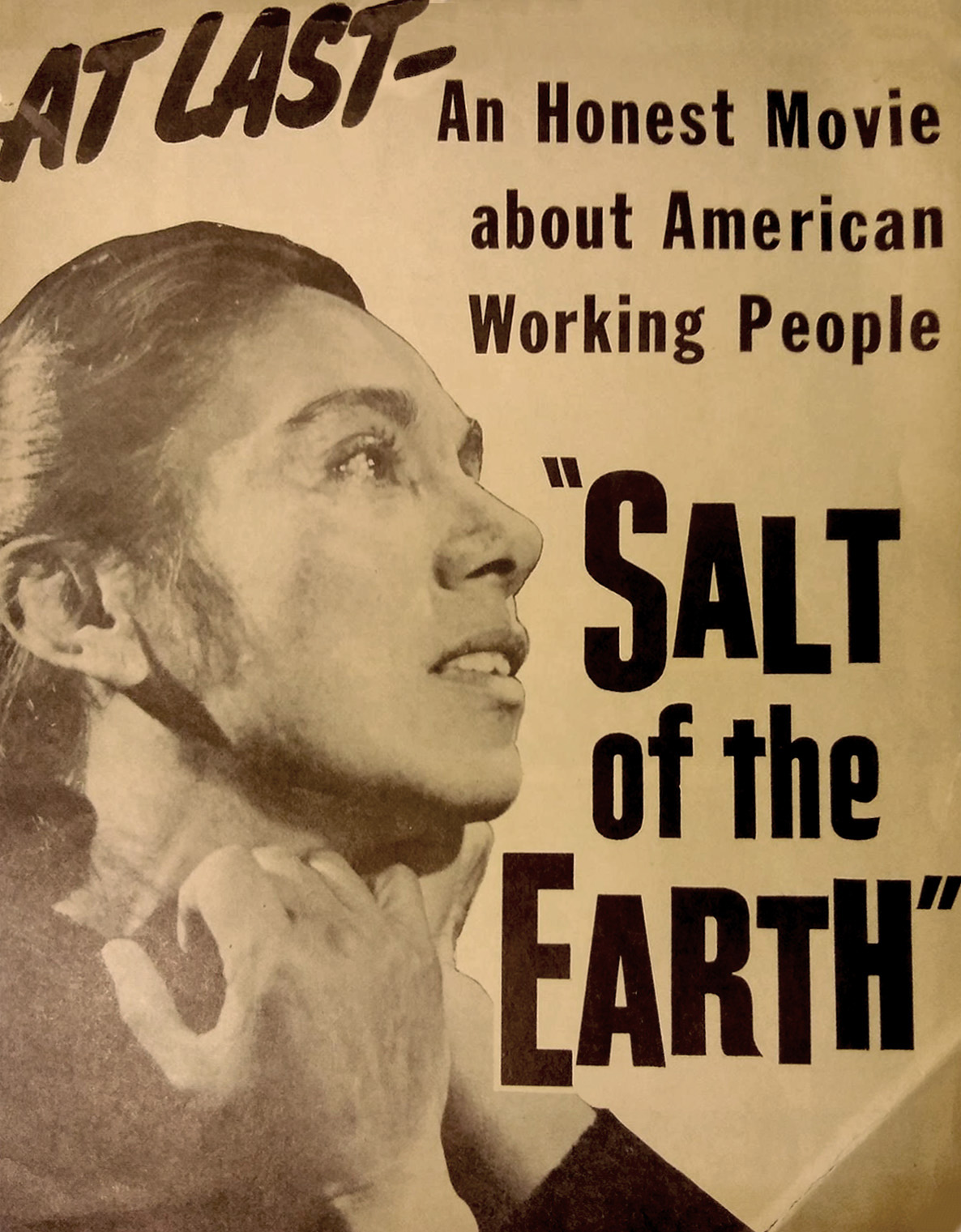
- Revueltas in the poster for Salt of the Earth
- Born: August 6, 1910; Lerdo, Durango, Mexico
- Died: April 30, 1996 (aged 85); Cuernavaca, Mexico
- Occupation: Actor
- Years active: 1946–1954, 1976–1977
- Children: Arturo Bodenstedt
- Parents: Jose Revueltas Gutiérrez (father); Romana Sánchez Arias (mother)

Rosaura Revueltas Sánchez (August 6, 1910 – April 30, 1996) was a Mexican actress of stage and screen whose career was cut short by the entertainment industry blacklist in the 1950s. She is best known for her role in the 1954 film Salt of the Earth.

== Early life ==
Rosaura Revueltas was born in Lerdo, Durango, Mexico to the famously artistic Revueltas Sánchez family and had three brothers who were artists: Silvestre Revueltas, a composer; José Revueltas, a writer; and Fermín Revueltas, a painter. The family moved to Mexico City in 1921 and Rosaura enrolled in the Humboldt School, where she learned German and English. She also studied ballet and acting.

After marrying German citizen Frederick Bodenstedt and having a son, Arturo, Rosaura opted for a profession in the arts. She initially took up dance, making her public debut in Carmen at Bellas Artes in 1945. She then participated in the Arte Folklórico Español production of La doma de la fiera (1945). She had her first acting success on stage in La desconocida de Arrás (1946). By 1950, she was starring in El cuadrante de la soledad. Although she continued to do theatrical work in the early 1950s, such as Edmundo Baez's play Un Alfiler en los Ojos (1952), she mostly turned her attention to film acting, culminating in her best-known film Salt of the Earth (1954).

== Film career ==
In 1950, Revueltas obtained a minor part in Pancho Villa vuelve (1950). Next, she earned a more prominent role in Un día de vida (1950). She portrayed Rosa Suárez, viuda de Ortiz (the widow of Ortiz), in Las Islas Marías (1951), featuring Pedro Infante. The following year, she was in El rebozo de Soledad, and in 1953 she played Tia Magdalena in the American-made film Sombrero.

In 1951, Revueltas began a pattern of selecting roles in politically charged films when she starred as the "Madre superiora" in Muchachas de Uniforme. It was the Mexican remake of the 1931 German film Mädchen in Uniform, which was one of the first screen representations of lesbian romance. Her willingness to choose pathbreaking projects sometimes caused her to be targeted by politicians and Catholic Church officials. After the release of Muchachas de Uniforme, the Catholic Church urged a boycott of the film. In the aftermath of the controversy, Revueltas immigrated to the United States. She again sought a role that offered a progressive representation of women when she landed the main part in Herbert J. Biberman's Salt of the Earth.

The story was based on the 1951 Empire Zinc strike in Grant County, New Mexico. She played Esperanza Quintero, the wife of a mine worker. In the film, Esperanza's husband and fellow miners decide to go on strike, and in turn, their wives do the same in order to support their spouses and gain rights of their own.

Revueltas was not Biberman's first choice for Esperanza. Originally his wife Gale Sondergaard was cast, but upon further reflection, Biberman thought the role should be portrayed by a Spanish-speaking actress. Revueltas was one of the few professional actors in Salt of the Earth. Most of the other roles were played by actual miners, some of whom had taken part in real-life strikes. For instance, Juan Chacón, who played her husband Ramon Quintero, was the president of a local miners' union.

== Blacklisted ==
The Hollywood blacklist and Red Scare cast a shadow over Salt of the Earth. The film's director Herbert Biberman was a member of the Hollywood Ten—the initial group of film artists blacklisted and jailed for refusing to cooperate with the House Committee on Un-American Activities. His Academy Award-winning actress wife Gale Sondergaard supported Biberman throughout this time period, and she was blacklisted as well. The film's producer Paul Jarrico and writer Michael Wilson were also blacklistees. Because of her involvement in Salt of the Earth, Revueltas became a blacklistee too.

Near the end of filming on February 25, 1953, Revueltas was arrested by the U.S. Immigration and Naturalization Service (INS) on an alleged passport violation (not having it stamped properly upon entry to the country). She was taken from the filming location in Silver City, New Mexico and driven 150 miles to El Paso, Texas. During the drive, she was repeatedly asked if she was a Communist and if her friends were Communists. "She said she didn't know, that she was just working on the picture, and she hummed. In El Paso she was kept under armed guard in a hotel room." As a result of her confinement, at least one scene was filmed by a Revueltas stand-in with her back to the camera. Esperanza's voice-over narration had to be taped later in Mexico.

Revueltas was released from custody on March 6, 1953 and could return to Mexico, but she was never allowed to work in American films again. She once said that "[s]ince [the INS] had no evidence to present of my 'subversive' character, I can only conclude that I was 'dangerous' because I had been playing a role that gave status and dignity to the character of a Mexican-American woman."

Due to the political climate, Salt of the Earth was restricted to a very limited U.S. release and garnered almost no publicity. However, it did receive mild praise from Bosley Crowther of The New York Times. He called it

a strong pro-labor film with a particularly sympathetic interest in the Mexican-Americans with whom it deals. True, it frankly implies that the mine operators have taken advantage of the Mexican-born or descended laborers, have forced a "speed up" in their mining techniques and given them less respectable homes than provided the so-called "Anglo" laborers. It slaps at brutal police tactics in dealing with strikers and it gets in some rough, sarcastic digs at the attitude of "the bosses" and the working of the Taft–Hartley Law.

While many people were blacklisted during McCarthyism in the 1950s, Salt of the Earth was the only film to be blacklisted. Because it was largely unknown in North America for the first decade, Revueltas was not given full recognition for her acting achievement (note: she did win Best Actress in 1954 at the Karlovy Vary International Film Festival in the former Czechoslovakia). Then, as a "cult" following for the film grew in the U.S. in the 1960s and '70s, Revueltas was appreciated more and more. For example, at a special Los Angeles screening in 1976, L.A. Times reviewer Linda Gross wrote about the movie's cast of professional and non-professional actors: "All perform exceedingly well. Miss Revueltas is stunning. Her portrayal is unforgettable." In the 1980s, public television began showing Salt of the Earth; film critics and scholars began writing about it; the film was released on videocassette; and increasingly the general public started to see it. In 1992, nearly 40 years after being suppressed, it was inducted into the Library of Congress's National Film Registry of significant U.S. films.

== Later years ==
Barred from getting hired in the U.S. or Mexico, Revueltas moved to East Germany in 1957 and lived there for three years. While in East Germany, she worked with the Berliner Ensemble—the company of the late playwright Bertolt Brecht. She also acted on stage in Cuba where she starred in The Caucasian Chalk Circle in 1961.

She moved back to Mexico in the early 1960s and found herself in difficult financial straits. She taught dance and began to write plays. It was not until 1976 that she made her first film since being blacklisted, Mina, Viento de Libertad (Mina, Wind of Freedom). In that same year, she played Tía Licha in Lo Mejor de Teresa (The Best of Teresa). Her final film was Balun Canan (1977).

In 1979, she published the book Los Revueltas: Biografía de una familia (The Revueltas: Biography of a Family). At the 1982 premiere of A Crime to Fit the Punishment—a documentary about the making of Salt of the Earth—she spoke about her blacklisting by the Mexican film industry. She appeared occasionally at film festivals, such as the 36th Berlin International Film Festival in 1986 where she served as one of the judges. At the 1988 Barcelona Film Festival, she sat on a panel with fellow blacklistees Jules Dassin, John Berry, and Walter Bernstein for a screening of The Front (1976).

In her later years, Revueltas made her home in Cuernavaca and taught dance and hatha yoga. When asked during an interview on Radio UNAM if she regretted taking the starring role in Salt of the Earth, she replied:

I never cared about making the film to act as the lead actress, because I knew that with that film I would lose my career. So I made it with the full awareness of doing something for the Mexican people in the United States and to denounce what is still current. If the circumstances were to arise again, I would do the same.

== Death ==
She died in Cuernavaca at age 85 on April 20, 1996, six months after having been diagnosed with lung cancer. She was survived by her son and grandchildren.

== Awards ==
She won a Cuauhtémoc Award for her work in Un día de vida, and then a Best Supporting Actress honor at Mexico's 1953 Ariel Awards for El rebozo de Soledad. In 1954, the Karlovy Vary International Film Festival conferred its Best Actress Award on Revueltas for Salt of the Earth.

== Legacy ==
In 2000, the film One of the Hollywood Ten was released. Written and directed by Karl Francis, it's a dramatization of Herbert Biberman's blacklist experience, and includes a segment on Salt of the Earth in which Revueltas is portrayed by actress Ángela Molina.

== Selected filmography ==
- Pancho Villa vuelve, a.k.a. Pancho Villa Returns (1950)
- Del odio nace el amor, a.k.a. The Torch (1950)
- Un Día de Vida, a.k.a. One Day of Life (1950)
- Muchachas de Uniforme, a.k.a. Girls in Uniform (1951)
- Las Islas Marías (1951)
- El Cuarto Cerrado (1952)
- El rebozo de Soledad (1952)
- Sombrero (1953)
- Salt of the Earth (1954)
- Mina, Viento de Libertad, a.k.a. Mina, Wind of Freedom (1976)
- Lo Mejor de Teresa (1976)
- Balún Canán (1976)
