= Revueltas Sánchez =

Revueltas Sánchez is the surname of the children of Gregorio Revueltas Gutiérrez (1871-1923) and his wife Romana Sánchez Arias (1883-1939), a Mexican artist family with roots in Durango. They had twelve children. The family lived in Guadalajara, Jalisco after 1910, before they moved to Mexico City in 1913.

== Notable family members ==
- Consuelo Revueltas Sánchez (1909–1990), naïve artist
- Fermín Revueltas Sánchez (1901–1935), painter
- José Revueltas Sánchez (1914–1976), writer and political activist
- Rosaura Revueltas Sánchez (1910–1996), actress and writer
- Silvestre Revueltas Sánchez (1899-1940), composer, violinist and conductor
- Agustin Revueltas Sanchez (1920-1996) artist, businessman

== Notable descendants ==
- Children of José:
  - Román Revueltas Retes (b. 1952), violinist, journalist, and painter
- Children of Silvestre:
  - Eugenia Revueltas Acevedo (b. 1934), writer
  - Carmen Revueltas Klarecy (later Carmen Montoya and Carmen Peers, born c. 1920–died 1995), ballet and flamenco dancer
- Children of Agustin
  - Arthur P. Revueltas (b. 1954), educator, deputy superintendent, Montebello Unified School District
