= Karl Francis =

Welsh TV and filmmaker (born 1 April 1942)

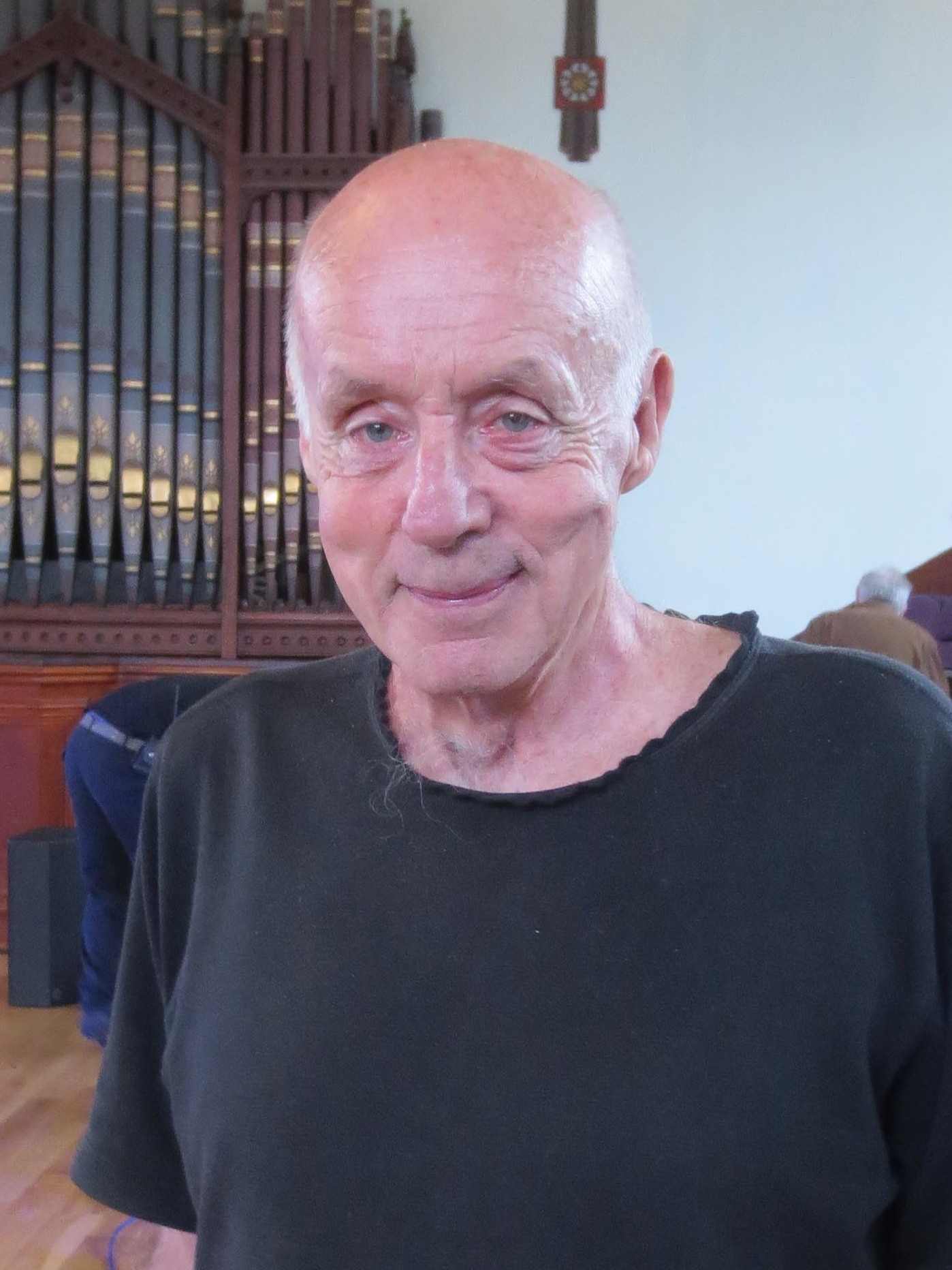
Karl Francis in 2014

Karl Francis (born 1 April 1942) is a Welsh film and television director, producer and screenwriter, associated with left-wing political causes. His work has included output in both English and Welsh.

== Biography ==
Francis was born in Bedwas in South Wales. He won a scholarship which allowed him to study at Manchester University where he gained his BA in 1964. He then attended Hornsey College of Art to study for a post-graduate diploma on Film in Education. He began his media career in television in 1971, first as an independent investigator, before taking a production post with ITV, working on Weekend World for London Weekend Television. In 1973 he switched to the BBC and produced programmes such as 2nd House.

In 1977 he wrote, produced and directed the docu-drama Above us the Earth. The film, shot in the spring and summer of 1975, records the closure of the Ogilvie colliery in the Rhymney Valley and the effect on the miners and the larger community. The film uses professional and amateur actors to show the relationships between workers, unions and the National Coal Board, along with footage of the political leaders of the day. The film is seen as an important film in its social commentary and is now part of the National Screen and Sound Archive of Wales. In 2010 BBC Wales selected Above us the Earth as one of the ten greatest films about Wales. In 2012, the BFI/UK Film Council selected Above Us The Earth as the best independent film made in Wales.

In 1995 he was appointed the Head of Drama at BBC Wales, a role he held until 1997.

In 2008 Francis released Hope Eternal, the film tells the story of a Madagascan nurse working in a Tuberculosis and AIDS hospice in the Congo. Hope Eternal was made in six languages combining both film and poetry simultaneously using subtitles in English. The film opened the Hay Sony Film Festival 2008 and was submitted as the UK nominee for the category of Best Foreign Language Film for the 82nd Academy Awards; though it failed to be selected for the final five nominees.

In August 2011 the Independent Police Complaints Commission ("IPCC") upheld a complaint that the South Wales Police had failed to investigate correctly a number of accusations; associated charges were later dropped. The IPCC described the investigation as demonstrating a "Low level of investigatory standards" and noted that "[the] South Wales Police covered their tracks to enforce forensic evidence" amongst other significant criticisms. As of 1 August 2011 the South Wales Police were investigating these complaints against them as instructed by the IPCC.

== Films ==
- Above Us the Earth (1977)
- Afternoon of War (1980)
- The Mouse and the Woman (1980)
- Giro City (1982)
- Yr Alcoholig Llon (1983)
- Milwr Bychan (1984)
- Ms. Rhymney Valley (1985)
- Nineteen 96 (1989)
- Rebecca's Daughters (1992)
- Streetlife (1995)
- One of the Hollywood Ten (2000)
- Hope Eternal (2008)
- Hair In The Gate (2012) Short Film

== Television ==
- Factfinder (1971)
- Chekhov in Derry (1982)
- Morphine and Dolly Mixtures (1990)
- Raymond Williams: a Journey of Hope (1990)
- Civvies (1992)

== Notes and references ==
Media offices
Preceded by Ruth Caleb	BBC Wales Head of Drama; 1995-1997	Succeeded by Pedr James
