= Salt of the Earth (1954 film) =

1954 film by Herbert J. Biberman

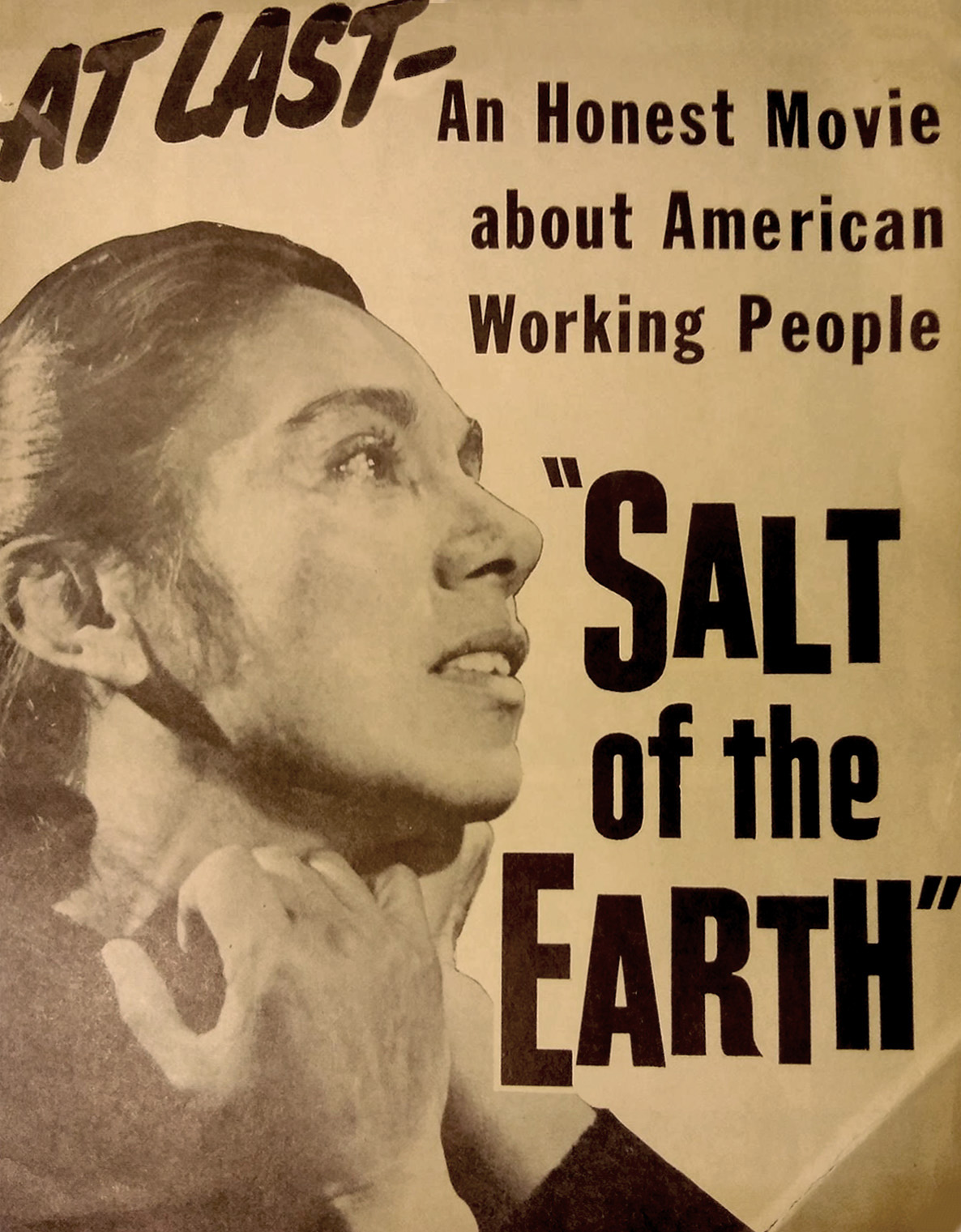
- Theatrical release poster
- Directed by: Herbert J. Biberman
- Screenplay by: Michael Wilson
- Produced by: Paul Jarrico
- Starring: Rosaura Revueltas; Juan Chacón; Will Geer; David Wolfe; David Sarvis; Mervin Williams
- Cinematography: Stanley Meredith; Leonard Stark
- Edited by: Joan Laird; Ed Spiegel
- Music by: Sol Kaplan
- Distributed by: Independent Productions
- Release date: March 14, 1954 (New York City)
- Running time: 94 minutes
- Country: United States
- Languages: English; Spanish
- Budget: $250,000

Salt of the Earth is a 1954 American independent drama film written by Michael Wilson, directed by Herbert J. Biberman, and produced by Paul Jarrico. Because all three men were blacklisted by the Hollywood establishment due to their alleged involvement in communist politics, Salt of the Earth was one of the first fully independent films made outside of the Hollywood studio system.

It was also one of the first motion pictures to advance the feminist social and political point of view. Its plot centers on a long and difficult strike, based on the 1951 strike against the Empire Zinc Company in Grant County, New Mexico. The company is identified as "Delaware Zinc", and the setting is "Zinc Town, New Mexico". The film shows how the miners, the company, and the police react during the strike. Shot in a style influenced by Italian neorealism, and making atmospheric use of New Mexico's landscapes, Salt of the Earth employed mostly local miners and their families as actors.

The name of the film is an allusion to the phrase "salt of the earth", used by Jesus in the Sermon on the Mount.

The film was initially mired in Red Scare controversy and was suppressed. Eventually though, it was seen by more and more people until it came to be recognized as an important cultural, political and aesthetic work. In 1992, it was selected for preservation in the Library of Congress's National Film Registry of significant U.S. films.

== Plot ==
Esperanza and Ramón

Esperanza Quintero is a miner's wife in Zinc Town, New Mexico, a community which is essentially run and owned by Delaware Zinc, Inc. Esperanza is thirty-five years old, pregnant with her third child and emotionally dominated by her husband, Ramón Quintero. We know from her concern about her onomásticos or día de mi/su santo (a.k.a. Name Day) that it is 12 November as that is the onomásticos of persons named Esperanza.

The majority of the miners are Mexican-Americans and want decent working conditions equal to those of white or "Anglo" miners. The unionized workers go on strike, but the company refuses to negotiate and the impasse continues for months. Esperanza gives birth and, simultaneously, Ramón is beaten by police and jailed on bogus assault charges following an altercation with a union worker who betrayed his fellows. When Ramón is released, Esperanza tells him that he's no good to her in jail. He counters that if the strike succeeds, they will not only get better conditions right now but also win hope for their children's futures.

Miners before they strike

The company presents a Taft-Hartley Act injunction to the union, meaning any miners who picket will be arrested. Taking advantage of a loophole, the wives picket in their husbands' places. Some men dislike this tactic, seeing it as improper and dangerous. At first, Ramón forbids Esperanza from picketing, but she eventually joins the line while carrying her baby.

The sheriff, by company orders, arrests the leading women of the strike. Esperanza is among those taken to jail. The women are loud and unruly in jail and make it so unendurable for the sheriff, he releases them. When Esperanza returns home, Ramón tells her the strike is hopeless, as the company will easily outlast the miners. She insists that the union is stronger than ever and asks Ramón why he can't accept her as an equal in their marriage. Both angry, they sleep separately that night.

The next day the company evicts the Quintero family from their house. The union men and women arrive to protest the eviction. Ramón tells Esperanza that they can all fight together. The mass of workers and their families prove successful in saving the Quinteros' home. The company admits defeat and plans to negotiate. Esperanza believes that the community has won something no company can ever take away and it will be inherited by her children.

== Cast ==
The Professional Cast
- Rosaura Revueltas as Esperanza Quintero
- Will Geer as sheriff
- David Bauer (credited as David Wolfe) as Barton
- David Sarvis as Alexander
- Mervin Williams as Hartwell

The Non-Professional Cast

- Juan Chacón as Ramón Quintero
- Frank Talevera as Luis Quintero
- Mary Lou Castillo as Estella Quintero
- Henrietta Williams as Teresa Vidal
- Ernest Velázquez as Charley Vidal
- Ángela Sánchez as Consuelo Ruiz
- Joe T. Morales as Sal Ruiz
- Clorinda Alderette as Luz Morales
- Charles Coleman as Antonio Morales
- Virginia Jencks as Ruth Barnes
- Clinton Jencks as Frank Barnes
- Floyd Bostick as Jenkins
- E. S. Conerly as Kalinsky
- Adolfo Barela as a miner
- Albert Munoz as a miner
- Víctor Torres as Sebastián Prieto
- E. A. Rockwell as Vance
- William Rockwell as Kimbrough
- and other members of Mine-Mill Local 890

== Production ==
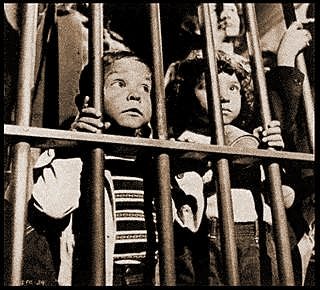
Miners and their children are jailed by the law

Herbert Biberman was one of the ten Hollywood screenwriters and directors who refused in 1947 to answer questions from the House Committee on Un-American Activities about their affiliations with the Communist Party USA. The "Hollywood Ten" were cited for contempt of Congress and jailed. Biberman was imprisoned in the Federal Correctional Institution at Texarkana for six months.

After his release from prison, unable to obtain work in Hollywood, Biberman met with fellow blacklistees about establishing their own production company and collaborating to make movies. In 1951, they formed the Independent Productions Corporation (IPC). Salt of the Earth was the sole production that IPC was able to finish. Other blacklistees who participated in the movie included Paul Jarrico, Will Geer, and Michael Wilson.

Before production commenced in Silver City, New Mexico, the mainstream press already labeled the film dangerous and subversive because it was known to be the creation of blacklisted professionals, and because the International Union of Mine, Mill and Smelter Workers (a.k.a. "Mine Mill") was helping to fund it. The Mine Mill union had been expelled from the CIO in 1950 for its unwillingness to purge suspected Communists from its leadership. The Hollywood Reporter warned readers that "H'wood Reds are shooting a feature length anti-American racial issue propaganda movie." Newsweek headlined its attack on the film, "Reds in the Desert".

As Tom Miller notes in a Cinéaste article, the early negative publicity made it difficult to assemble a film crew: "The International Alliance of Theatrical Stage Employees—IATSE, an AFL affiliate—refused to allow its members to work on Salt of the Earth because of the movie's politics. That the Hollywood unions wouldn't let their members work on such a pro-union film was bitter irony." As a consequence, IPC had to scramble to put together a makeshift crew.

Juan Chacón as Ramón Quintero

Only five professional actors were cast. The rest were residents of Grant County, New Mexico, or members of Mine Mill, Local 890, many of whom took part in the strike that inspired the movie. Juan Chacón was a real-life union local president. In the film he plays the protagonist who has trouble dealing with women as equals. The director was reluctant to cast him at first, thinking he was too "gentle", but both Revueltas and the director's sister-in-law, Sonja Dahl Biberman (wife of Biberman's brother Edward), urged him to cast Chacón as Ramón.

According to one journalist's account, "During the course of production in New Mexico in 1953, the trade press denounced it as a subversive plot, anti-Communist vigilantes fired rifle shots at the set, the film's leading lady Rosaura Revueltas was deported to Mexico, and from time to time a small airplane buzzed noisily overhead ... The film, edited in secret, was stored for safekeeping in an anonymous wooden shack in Los Angeles."

After principal photography ended, laboratories wouldn't process the film, which delayed postproduction work for months. As producer Paul Jarrico recalled in a 1983 interview, "I had to trot around the country with cans of film under my arms, putting the film through different labs under phony names. We had a lot of trouble, but we did complete the film, despite the obstacles."

== Reception ==
=== Critical response ===
With McCarthyism in full force at the time of release, the movie establishment did not embrace Salt of the Earth. Pauline Kael, who reviewed it for Sight and Sound, panned it as a simplistic left-wing "morality play" and said it was "as clear a piece of Communist propaganda as we have had in many years." Variety praised several elements in the film but called it "a propaganda picture which belongs in union halls rather than theatres."

Bosley Crowther, film critic for The New York Times, reviewed the picture somewhat favorably, both for its direction and screenplay:

Salt of the Earth is, in substance, simply a strong pro-labor film with a particularly sympathetic interest in the Mexican-Americans with whom it deals....But the real dramatic crux of the picture is the stern and bitter conflict within the membership of the union. It is the issue of whether the women shall have equality of expression and of strike participation with the men. And it is along this line of contention that Michael Wilson's tautly muscled script develops considerable personal drama, raw emotion and power.

As anti-Communist fervor waned, the movie started to be judged on its merits. By 2026, the review aggregator Rotten Tomatoes reported that 100% of critics (based on fifteen reviews) had given the movie a positive rating.

=== Suppression ===
Although Salt of the Earth received limited distribution in Western and Eastern Europe in the 1950s and won awards there, it was nearly impossible to see it in the United States. After its opening night in New York City, it languished for a decade because only thirteen theaters in the country were willing to show it. Roy Brewer of the IATSE leveraged his ties with the projectionists' union to cancel numerous bookings. The American Legion threatened to picket any theater that exhibited the movie. Salt of the Earth was denounced by the U.S. House of Representatives for its communist sympathies, and the FBI investigated the film's financing, looking for evidence of foreign funds that could justify prosecution under the Foreign Agents Registration Act.

In 1959, officials from the United States Information Agency testified before a House Appropriations subcommittee that a handful of movies, including Salt of the Earth, "were giving the United States trouble overseas." Representative Frank T. Bow (R-OH) said, "such films were painting a false picture abroad of the United States and that something should be done about it." It wasn't until 1965 that Salt of the Earth was re-released.

=== Accolades ===
- Grand Prix - Crystal Globe for Best Feature Film (shared with True Friends) at the Karlovy Vary International Film Festival in Czechoslovakia in 1954. At that same festival, Rosaura Revueltas won the Best Actress Award.
- International Grand Prize from the Academie du Cinema de Paris in 1955.
- In 1992, the Library of Congress selected the film for preservation in the United States National Film Registry for being "culturally, historically, or aesthetically significant."
- The film is preserved by the Museum of Modern Art in New York City.

== Later history ==
Union meeting in the film

The story of the suppression of Salt of the Earth, as well as the people and labor struggle it depicts, inspired an underground audience of unionists, feminists, Mexican-Americans, leftists, film historians, and labor scholars. The movie found a new life in the U.S. in the late 1960s and early '70s and reached larger audiences through union halls, college campuses, art houses, women's associations, and film schools, even though it was projected with a relatively poor 16mm stock.

In subsequent decades, the film was shown on public television and released on videocassette. In 1997, Turner Classic Movies screened Salt of the Earth which further raised its profile beyond the initial cult following. In the early 2000s, the film's 50th anniversary prompted a number of commemorative events, including a national conference hosted by the College of Santa Fe in which Salt of the Earth was called "one of the most important and controversial films in American cinema history."

In an interview, political commentator Noam Chomsky praised the film's portrayal of union activity: "[T]he real work is being done by people who are not known, that's always been true in every popular movement in history ... I don't know how you get that across in a film. Actually, come to think of it, there are some films that have done it. I mean, I don't see a lot of visual stuff ... but I thought Salt of the Earth really did it. It was a long time ago, but at the time I thought that it was one of the really great movies—and of course it was killed, I think it was almost never shown."

The "Salt of the Earth Labor College" located in Tucson, Arizona is named after the film. The pro-labor institution (not a college per se) holds lectures and forums related to unionism and economic justice. The film is screened on a frequent basis.

=== Other releases ===
The full film

In 1987, a laserdisc version was released by the Voyager Company. On July 27, 1999, a digitally restored print of the film was released on DVD by Organa through Geneon (Pioneer), and packaged with the documentary The Hollywood Ten, which reported on the ten filmmakers who were blacklisted for refusing to cooperate with the House Un-American Activities Committee (HUAC). In 2004, a budget edition DVD was released by Alpha Video.

Because the film's copyright was not renewed in 1982, Salt of the Earth is now in the public domain.

=== Adaptations ===
The film was adapted into a two-act opera called Esperanza (Hope). The labor movement in Wisconsin along with University of Wisconsin–Madison opera professor Karlos Moser commissioned the production. The music was written by David Bishop and the libretto by Carlos Morton. The opera premiered in Madison, Wisconsin, on August 25, 2000, to positive reviews.

=== Portrayals in media ===
John Sayles' Return of the Secaucus 7 (1980) includes a wry homage to Salt of the Earth. When the reunited baby boomer characters are briefly jailed, they reminisce about their radical college days when they were locked up in a Secaucus, New Jersey jail and chanted "We want the formula! We want the formula!" to bewildered guards. The guards didn't realize it was an allusion to a Salt of the Earth scene in which the picketing Mexican-American women are arrested and thrown in jail. Esperanza has her infant child with her, and all the women chant "We want the formula!" to pressure the sheriff to either bring formula for the hungry baby or let them out of jail. He opts for the latter.

A documentary titled A Crime to Fit the Punishment, about the making of the film, was released in 1982 and directed by Barbara Moss and Stephen Mack. The title comes from a Paul Jarrico quote regarding the blacklistees who formed Independent Productions Corporation: "I have said that Salt of the Earth was our chance to really say something in film, because we had already been punished, we had already been blacklisted. I used the phrase, 'We wanted to commit a crime to fit the punishment.'" The documentary premiered on May 1, 1982 in Silver City, New Mexico, with many of the surviving Salt of the Earth cast and crew members in attendance.

A film drama, also based on the making of Salt of the Earth, was chronicled in One of the Hollywood Ten (2000). It was produced and directed by Karl Francis, starred Jeff Goldblum and Greta Scacchi, and was released in European countries on September 29, 2000.

A fictionalized account of the movie's production figured prominently in the Audible podcast series, The Big Lie (2022). Based on source material written by Paul Jarrico, the production features voice performances from Jon Hamm, Kate Mara, Ana de la Reguera, Bradley Whitford, John Slattery, Giancarlo Esposito, and David Strathairn, and was written by John Mankiewicz and Jamie Napoli.

== See also ==
- The Hollywood Ten, documentary film
- Jencks Act
- Jencks v. United States
- Labor history
- The Ladies Auxiliary of the International Union of Mine Mill and Smelter Workers
- International Union of Mine, Mill and Smelter Workers, Local 890
