= Empire Zinc Company =

Former American materials company

The Empire Zinc Company was a subsidiary of the New Jersey Zinc Company. It originally held claims in the Gilman Mining district in Colorado. From 1912 to 1915, the New Jersey Zinc Company acquired and consolidated the mines as the Eagle Mines and operated Empire Zinc Company as a subsidiary. It also bought the town of Gilman, Colorado and ran it as a company town. The Eagle Mine site at Gilman is an EPA Superfund site.

== History ==
The company was founded in the 1940s and was engaged in the exploration, development, and production of zinc and other minerals. Empire Zinc Company was known for its operations at the Hanover-Potosi mine in New Mexico, which was one of the largest zinc mines in the world. The company was also involved in the mining of lead, silver, and other minerals.

In the 1950s, Empire Zinc Company was involved in a labor dispute known as the Empire Zinc strike, which was a major event in the history of the American labor movement. The strike, which was led by the International Union of Mine, Mill, and Smelter Workers, was sparked by a dispute over wages and working conditions at the Hanover-Potosi mine. The strike was ultimately resolved through negotiations, and Empire Zinc Company continued to operate until it was acquired by the Hudson Bay Mining and Smelting Company in the 1970s.

The 1954 movie "Salt of the Earth" was based on the 1951 Empire Zinc Strike against New Jersey Zinc Company's Empire Zinc mine in Bayard, New Mexico.
