= Paul Jarrico =

American screenwriter (1915–1997)

- Born: Israel Shapiro; January 12, 1915; Los Angeles, California, U.S.
- Died: October 28, 1997 (aged 82)
- Education: University of Southern California – BA, 1936
- Occupations: Screenwriter; film producer
- Spouse(s): Sylvia Gussin (m. 1936; div. 1966) Yvette Le Floc'h (m. 1966; div. 1992) Lia Benedetti (m. 1992)
- Children: 1; Bill Jarrico

Paul Jarrico (12 January 1915 – 28 October 1997) was an Oscar-nominated American screenwriter who was blacklisted by the Hollywood movie studios during the era of McCarthyism.

== Biography ==
=== Early years ===
Paul Jarrico was born Israel Payssah Shapiro in Los Angeles, California on 12 January 1915. His parents were Jewish immigrants from Russia: his father Aaron from Kharkiv, Ukraine, and his mother Jennie from Minsk, Belarus. Aaron was a lawyer who defended trade unionists, immigrants, and the poor. He was also an ardent socialist (he had once been imprisoned in Ukraine as a "dangerous character") who shaped his son's political worldview.

While attending UCLA as a sophomore in 1933, Paul joined the Young Communist League. In his junior year, he transferred to UC Berkeley where he was further radicalized by the San Francisco General Strike, the rise of fascism in Europe, and other Depression era events. He soon joined the Communist Party (CPUSA), which he remained a member of until 1958. In January 1936, after having transferred to the University of Southern California, Jarrico married his longtime sweetheart, Sylvia Gussin. In June 1936, they both graduated with a Bachelor of Arts degree. A few years later, Sylvia's younger sister Zelma married the aspiring novelist Michael Wilson, with whom Jarrico would collaborate on future film projects.

=== Screenwriting career ===
Jarrico started working as a screenwriter in the late 1930s. After his agent advised him that "Israel Shapiro" was "too Jewish" of a name, he adopted "Paul Jarrico", which he legally changed in 1940. At first, Columbia Pictures hired him to write low-budget comedies and crime dramas such as No Time to Marry (1937), I Am the Law (1938), and Beauty for the Asking (1939). He then contracted with other studios. His script for the RKO film Tom, Dick and Harry (1941), starring Ginger Rogers, was nominated for an Academy Award for Best Original Screenplay, but it lost to Citizen Kane.

As part of the WWII morale-boosting effort, he co-scripted Thousands Cheer (1943) with Richard Collins. Jarrico also collaborated with Collins on the MGM film Song of Russia (1943), which was made under pressure from President Franklin D. Roosevelt to stir American support for the Soviets in their war against Nazi Germany.

In the latter half of 1943, Jarrico served in the U.S. Merchant Marine and helped deliver supplies to Allied forces in North Africa and Italy. When he returned home, he resumed screenwriting. Among his subsequent credits were The Search (1948), Not Wanted (1949), and The White Tower (1950).

=== Blacklisted ===
Although Jarrico escaped the first wave of the blacklist, he deeply sympathized with his "Hollywood Ten" colleagues who had defied the House Un-American Activities Committee (HUAC) in October 1947 and were convicted of contempt of Congress. To raise money for their defense, he produced a short documentary film in 1950 entitled "The Hollywood Ten". Then, in February 1951, Jarrico himself was named as a Communist by director Edward Dmytryk. Within weeks, Jarrico was subpoenaed by the HUAC. He immediately lost his job with RKO. As he described it, "One day my name was in the papers. The next day, when I showed up for work, they stopped me at the studio gates."

On April 13, 1951, Jarrico testified before the HUAC in Washington, D.C. It was the day after he had also been named by his former close friend and screenwriting partner Richard Collins. When asked by the Committee about his CPUSA membership, Jarrico invoked the Fifth Amendment. During his testimony, he engaged in heated exchanges with HUAC Chief Counsel Frank Tavenner and Congressman Clyde Doyle.

Upon returning to Los Angeles, Jarrico found himself blacklisted by the entire motion picture industry. Later in 1951, his passport was confiscated. At roughly this time, he became involved in a legal battle with Howard Hughes, head of RKO. Hughes had removed Jarrico's name as co-writer of The Las Vegas Story (1952). Jarrico sued to have his credit restored, but eventually lost the suit under the so-called morals clause for placing himself in public obloquy as a result of his HUAC non-cooperation.

In 1953, Jarrico went to New Mexico with fellow blacklistees Herbert J. Biberman and Michael Wilson to make Salt of the Earth. It was one of the first independent films made outside the Hollywood studio system. Wilson was designated as the screenwriter, and Jarrico "hired himself" as producer since there was no one else to take on that responsibility. Because the film was being created by blacklisted artists, it was harassed during production. Before shooting had ended, the lead actress Rosaura Revueltas was arrested and deported to Mexico. Film laboratories wouldn't process the footage, which delayed postproduction. Jarrico recalled in a 1983 interview, "I had to trot around the country with cans of film under my arms, putting the film through different labs under phony names. We had a lot of trouble, but we did complete the film, despite the obstacles." Salt of the Earth won international prizes but was blocked from theatrical exhibition in the U.S. After decades as an underground "cult" favorite, the film was deemed culturally significant by the United States Library of Congress in 1992 and selected for inclusion in the National Film Registry.

In 1958, Jarrico moved to Europe to escape the blacklist. His time in exile, mostly in Paris, lasted nearly twenty years. The blacklist caused him to be uncredited for many of his screenplays including The Paris Express (1952), The Girl Most Likely (1958), Five Branded Women (1960), The Treasure of the Aztecs (1965), and The Desperate Ones (1967). He also used the pseudonym "Peter Achilles" and "Peter A. Chilles" to co-script All Night Long (1962) and Who Killed Johnny R.? (1966), as well as an episode of the TV series The Defenders.

In February 1966, Jarrico divorced Sylvia Gussin. Later that year, he married a Frenchwoman, Yvette Le Floc'h, from whom he separated in 1977.

=== Later years ===
In 1975, Jarrico returned to the U.S. There would be a few more short stays in Europe during the decade, but he primarily settled in California for the rest of his life. In the 1980s, he was hired as a lecturer at UC Santa Barbara. He taught courses on screenwriting, the Hollywood studio system, and the social roots of American cinema. He had one additional script made into a film, Messenger of Death (1988), co-written with Rex Burns.

Jarrico died on 28 October 1997 in a car crash on Pacific Coast Highway. He was driving home to Ojai, California after attending a ceremony marking the 50th anniversary of HUAC's first hearings on Communist subversion in Hollywood. He was 82 years old.

== Filmography ==
- No Time to Marry (1937)
- I Am the Law (1938)
- The Little Adventuress (1938)
- Beauty for the Asking (1939)
- The Face Behind the Mask (1941)
- Tom, Dick and Harry (1941)
- Thousands Cheer (1943)
- Song of Russia (1943)
- The Search (1948)
- Not Wanted (1949)
- The White Tower (1950)
- The Hollywood Ten (1950)
- The Las Vegas Story (1952)
- The Paris Express (1952)
- Salt of the Earth (1954)
- The Girl Most Likely (1958)
- Five Branded Women (1960)
- All Night Long (1962)
- The Treasure of the Aztecs (1965)
- Who Killed Johnny R.? (1966)
- The Desperate Ones (1967)
- Hot Line (1967)
- The Day That Shook the World (1975)
- Messenger of Death (1988)
