= Herbert Biberman =

American screenwriter and film director

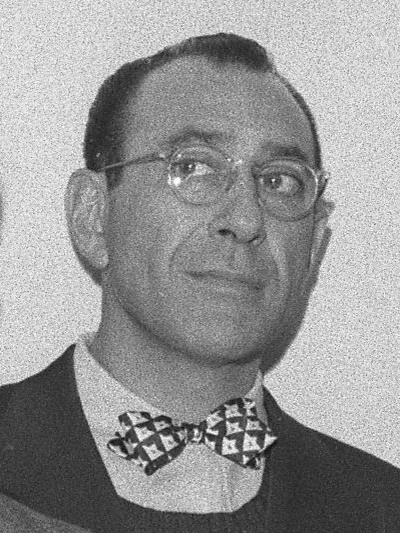
- Biberman in 1947
- Born: Herbert Joseph Biberman; March 4, 1900; Philadelphia, Pennsylvania, U.S.
- Died: June 30, 1971 (aged 71); New York City, New York, U.S.
- Other name: Herbert J. Biberman
- Occupations: Screenwriter and film director
- Spouse: Gale Sondergaard (m. 1930)
- Children: 2
- Relatives: Edward Biberman (brother)

Herbert J. Biberman (March 4, 1900 – June 30, 1971) was an American screenwriter and film director. He was one of the Hollywood Ten and directed Salt of the Earth (1954), a film barely released in the United States, about a zinc miners' strike in Grant County, New Mexico. His membership in the Directors Guild of America was posthumously restored in 1997; he had been expelled in 1950.

Biberman was born in Philadelphia, Pennsylvania, to Joseph and Eva Biberman and was the brother of American artist, Edward Biberman.

He attended Central High School in Philadelphia, and then went on to the University of Pennsylvania. He graduated from Penn in 1921, being chosen to deliver the "Ivy Oration" at the Commencement ceremony. From 1924 to 1926 he attended the Yale School of Drama, being a member of the first acting classes to study with George Pierce Baker. In the late 1920s he began performing in plays by The Theatre Guild, and joined Cheryl Crawford and Harold Clurman in founding its "Studio Theatre" for experimental productions - which included and translation of "Red Rust," a Russian play about an abusive Communist leader. By 1930 he began his career as a Broadway director with the American premiere production of Sergei Tretyakov's Roar, China! and the world premiere production of Green Grow the Lilacs by Lynn Riggs, which was the basis for the later musical Oklahoma!.

Moving to Hollywood, Biberman's career included writing such films as King of Chinatown (1939), When Tomorrow Comes (1939), Action in Arabia (1944), The Master Race (1944), which he also directed, and New Orleans (1947), as well as directing such films as One Way Ticket (1935) and Meet Nero Wolfe (1936). He married actress Gale Sondergaard in 1930; the marriage lasted for the rest of Biberman's life. Biberman died from bone cancer in 1971 in New York City.

== HUAC ==
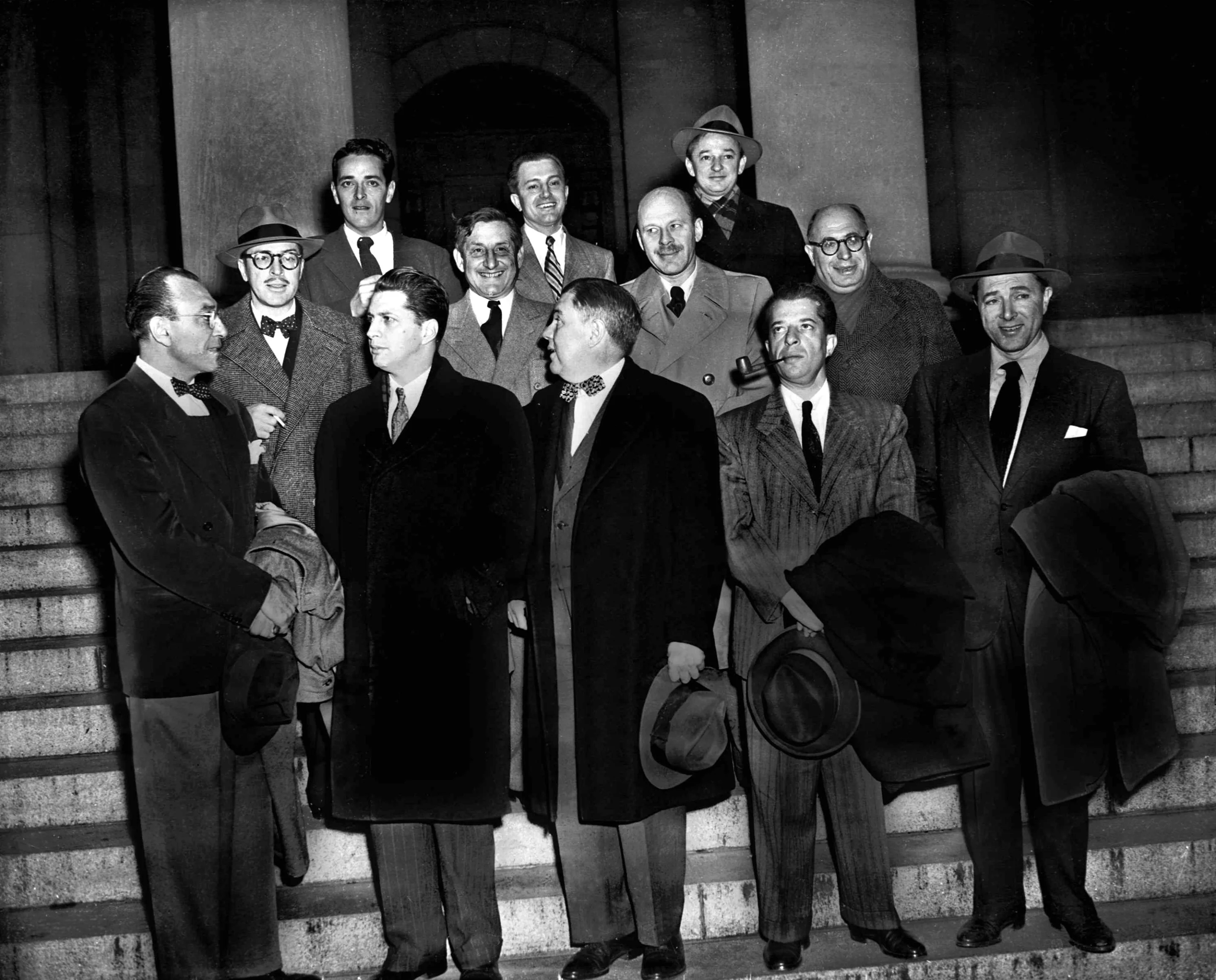
"The Hollywood Ten" stand with their attorneys outside district court in Washington, D.C. before arraignment on contempt of Congress charges. The ten were charged for refusing to cooperate with the House Un-American Activities Committee. (Front row, L-R): Herbert Biberman, attorney Martin Popper, attorney Robert W. Kenny, Albert Maltz and Lester Cole. (Second row, L-R): Dalton Trumbo, John Howard Lawson, Alvah Bessie and Samuel Ornitz. (Top row, L-R): Ring Lardner Jr., Edward Dmytryk and Adrian Scott.

Though he would become firmly pro-war after Germany invaded the Soviet Union, during the Molotov–Ribbentrop pact, his outspoken opposition to U.S. Lend-Lease to the United Kingdom was so intense, the FBI suspected Biberman (who was actually Jewish) of being a Nazi. In 1947, the Congressional House Committee on Un-American Activities began its investigation into the film industry, and Biberman became one of ten Hollywood writers and directors cited for contempt of Congress when they refused to answer questions about their American Communist Party affiliation. Evidence presented in the hearing showed that Biberman had been a member of the communist party since at least 1944. Biberman and the others were imprisoned for their contempt convictions, Biberman for six months. Edward Dmytryk ultimately cooperated with the House committee, but Biberman and the others were blacklisted by the Hollywood studios.

Biberman worked independently after his release from jail. The result was Salt of the Earth (1954), a fictionalized account of the Grant County miners' strike. The screenplay was by Michael Wilson and it was produced by Paul Jarrico, neither members of the Ten but they were both also blacklisted. Salt of the Earth has been deemed "culturally significant" by the United States Library of Congress and selected for preservation in the National Film Registry.

== Legacy ==
One of the Hollywood Ten, a 2000 film chronicling his blacklisting and the making of Salt of the Earth from Biberman's point of view, starred Jeff Goldblum as Biberman and Greta Scacchi as his wife, the actress Gale Sondergaard. The film's closing credits noted Biberman had never been removed from the old blacklist formally, and that Sondergaard had not found work in Hollywood until shortly before her husband's death. Biberman's membership in the Directors Guild of America, which was stripped in 1950, was restored in 1997.

== Filmography ==
Year	Film	Role	Notes
1935	Eight Bells	dialogue director	
1935	One-Way Ticket	Director	(as Herbert Biberman)
1936	Meet Nero Wolfe	Director	
1939	King of Chinatown	Writer (story)	
1939	When Tomorrow Comes	Writer	(uncredited)
1944	Action in Arabia	Writer (original screenplay)	(as Herbert Biberman)
1944	The Master Race	Writer (screenplay) (story), Director	
1944	Together Again	Writer (story)	(as Herbert Biberman)
1946	Abilene Town	associate producer	
1947	New Orleans	Writer (story), associate producer	
1950	The Hollywood Ten	Himself	(uncredited)
1954	Salt of the Earth	Director	
1969	Slaves	Writer, Director	
