= Smith v. Cain =

- Supreme Court of the United States

Argued November 8, 2011 Decided January 10, 2012
- Full case name: Smith v. Cain
- Citations: 565 U.S. 73 (more)

Holding
- A witness's statements are "plainly material" under Brady when they are the only evidence linking the defendant to the crime.

Court membership
- Chief Justice John Roberts Associate Justices Antonin Scalia · Anthony Kennedy; Clarence Thomas · Ruth Bader Ginsburg; Stephen Breyer · Samuel Alito; Sonia Sotomayor · Elena Kagan

Case opinions
- Majority: Roberts, joined by Scalia, Kennedy, Ginsburg, Breyer, Alito, Sotomayor, Kagan
- Dissent: Thomas

Laws applied
- U.S. Const. amend. XIV

Smith v. Cain, 565 U.S. 73 (2012), is a United States Supreme Court decision in which the court held that a witness's statements are "plainly material" under Brady v. Maryland when they are the only evidence linking the defendant to the crime. Therefore, the prosecution was required to turn over the information during discovery.

== Facts ==
The defendant, Juan Smith, was convicted of murdering five people during an armed robbery based upon the testimony of a single witness. Smith appealed the verdict because the prosecution failed to disclose statements made by that witness to an investigator prior to trial that the witness:

- could not provide a description of the robbery perpetrators other than that they were black males;
- could not identify anyone because he could not see their faces; and
- would not know the robbers if he saw them.

All Louisiana state courts rejected Smith's appeal and the Supreme Court granted certiorari.

== Holding ==
The issue before the Court was whether or not the suppressed statements by the sole witness were material under Brady v. Maryland. If so, the prosecution had violated Smith's due process rights. The Court held that they were.

The Court began its analysis recounting the standard on materiality set forth in United States v. Bagley, which states that evidence is material when "there is a reasonable probability that, had the evidence been disclosed, the result of the proceeding would have been different." As the Court explained, quoting Kyles v. Whitley, the "reasonable probability" standard looks to whether "the likelihood of a different result is great enough to 'undermine confidence in the outcome of the trial.'”

The Court stated that the witness's statements were "plainly material," because they were the only evidence linking the defendant to the crime.
