= Harvey Matusow =

American communist (1926–2002)

- Born: Harvey Job Matusow; October 3, 1926; New York City, New York, U.S.
- Died: January 17, 2002 (aged 75); Claremont, New Hampshire, U.S.
- Known for: Recanted testimony against communist activists
- Political party: Communist Party USA (1947–1950)
- Spouses: "Around a dozen", including: Arvilla Peterson Bentley (first); Emily; Irene Gibson (m. 2001)

Harvey Job Matusow (October 3, 1926 – January 17, 2002) was an American communist who became an informer for the Federal Bureau of Investigation and subsequently a paid witness for a variety of anti-subversion bodies, including the House Un-American Activities Committee, before eventually recanting the bulk of his testimony. These activities led to his own perjury conviction and a prison sentence. His McCarthy era activities overshadowed his later work as an artist, actor and producer.

== Background ==
Harvey Matusow was born on October 3, 1926, in the Bronx, the son of Russian immigrants.

== Career ==
Matusow served in the U.S. Army during World War II. On returning to New York he worked in various creative fields, including journalism and stage and radio acting. He became a member of the Communist Party USA in 1947.

=== HUAC ===
In 1950, Matusow, a young and low-ranking party member employed as a clerk in the Communist Party bookstore in Manhattan, walked in to the FBI and offered his services as a paid informant. During a 1950 summer road trip to the West Coast, he made a prolonged stop at the San Cristobal Valley Ranch, a resort near Taos, New Mexico, directed by musician Jenny Vincent and her husband and favored by progressives, and filed detailed reports with the Albuquerque office of the FBI there, which paid him $75 a month; he listed the license plate numbers of cars in the resort's parking lot and noted the comings and goings of people he recognized as party members or he alleged were members. Notable visitors to the ranch during his stay included Jessica Mitford and Virginia Durr, but he does not appear to have identified them in his reports. In December, Matusow was abruptly summoned to New York and expelled from the party; soon afterward, the FBI, deciding that he was of no further use, dropped him from the rolls of its paid informants.

Matusow, freed from FBI supervision, went, on his own initiative, to HUAC and offered to testify in upcoming trials and hearings as a paid expert witness by providing information on his former Communist Party comrades and people he claimed to have known or met in party circles. He also became an editor of the anticommunist bulletin Counterattack and worked as a campaign aide to Joseph McCarthy. While working as an informant, Matusow provided information against folksingers associated with People's Songs, where he had briefly worked, including Pete Seeger, and later claimed to know that 126 communists worked for the Sunday New York Times even though the total number of employees was alleged to be 100. Matusow also claimed that he had known Clinton Jencks, an officer of the Mine, Mill & Smelter Workers Union to be a member of the American Communist Party; that resulted in Jencks being sent to prison for perjury for having signed, as a union official, a required affidavit of nonmembership in the Communist Party under the Taft-Hartley Act.

Seeger's band, The Weavers, went from a hit record with "Wimoweh" to being blacklisted and finding no work. Seeger was later sentenced to one year in prison for contempt of Congress after he was subpoenaed to appear before HUAC and refused to testify, citing the First Amendment's guarantee of freedom of speech as his justification (the sentence was vacated on technical grounds); Seeger eventually forgave Matusow for his youthful mistakes and noted that Matusow never did more than cost Seeger a few jobs.

Harvey Matusow met fellow FBI informer, Elizabeth Bentley, on October 3, 1952, at the offices of her publisher. Matusow later claimed that he began a relationship with Bentley, and that she was self-medicating for depression and anxiety: "She used alcoholism to ease her pain and she had a lot of pain." At the end of the evening, he would take her home and "pour" her into bed. Every couple of weeks, they would sleep together, but usually, she was too drunk. Matusow claimed that she was upset at her "frivolous treatment" in the press. "She didn't understand the hostility.... She never got to the point where she could handle it." Bentley complained about the way she had been treated by the FBI: "She felt that she'd been used and abused." Matusow also said:

Contrary to what Miss Bentley thinks and says, I did have dinner with her on October 3, 1952, and she did cry in her beer and say she did not have new information. She said she did not have any new information. She is a liar, and she admitted so in substance that night.

Bentley denied this allegation. Two men who joined Matusow and Bentley at dinner, Llewellyn Watts and Earl Henry, supported Bentley's account: Henry told the FBI that Bentley said very little as Matusow "monopolized the conversation," while Watts recalled that "'Matusow was continuously interrupting to tell about his [Communist Party activities].'"

=== False Witness ===
In 1955, he came clean with a book, False Witness, in which he disclosed that he had been an FBI informant and was paid to give information about members of the Communist Party. He also claimed in the book that McCarthy and Roy Cohn had encouraged him to lie. Because of the book, Matusow was found guilty of perjury and sentenced to five years in prison, of which he served 44 months, and was ultimately blacklisted.

=== Exile ===
After leaving prison Matusow sought, through a variety of artistic and cultural projects, to put the past behind him. However, having alienated people across the political spectrum (some hated him for his McCarthyite activities, some for his subsequent recantation), he found it impossible to move on. The breaking point came when, having painstakingly compiled a record of more than 200,000 works of art created under the Federal Art Project, he was told by a charitable trust that publishing funds would be made available only if he would withdraw from the project. Matusow responded by dumping all his research material in the Hudson River. Shortly afterwards, he went to live in England, where he was based from 1966 to 1973, living first in London then in the Essex village of Ingatestone.

During his time in England, he was involved with the London Film Makers Cooperative and worked with the composer Annea Lockwood, who appeared on record under the name Anna Lockwood. In 1972, he produced a festival of contemporary music called the International Carnival of Experimental Sound. The event's highlights included performances by Charlotte Moorman (in the Roundhouse and in the Richard Demarco Gallery in Edinburgh) and John Cage's HPSCHD, for eight harpsichords and projections of the American space program. A train was hired to take participants and public to Edinburgh, to link with the Edinburgh Festival; Charlotte Moorman performed Nam June Paik's TV Bra in the Richard Demarco Gallery.

Matusow's activities also included managing the experimental band Naked Software, attempting to market a toy called the Stringless Yo-yo, making records as part of Harvey Matusow's Jews Harp Band, and broadcasting occasionally for BBC radio.

During his period in England, he donated his papers to the University of Sussex. The donation has since been organised into two archives, one dealing with Matusow's adventures in McCarthyism, the other dealing with his various artistic activities.

=== International Society for the Abolition of Data Processing Machines ===
Matusow founded the International Society for the Abolition of Data Processing Machines, which claimed 1500 members in 1969. He stated, "The computer has a healthy and conservative function in mathematics and other sciences," but "when the uses involve business or government, and the individual is tyrannized, then we make our stand."

=== Magic Mouse ===
Matusow returned to the United States in 1973 and, on the advice of attorney Paul Marshall, attached himself to the large Renaissance Community commune in Turners Falls, Massachusetts, and marrying the ex-wife of the commune's spiritual advisor, the Aquarian Age mystic Elwood Babbitt. He eventually settled in Tucson, Arizona, where, working with the Magic Mouse Theatre, he developed a clown persona named Cockyboo for stage and television. Matusow began Magic Mouse as a radio show in Tucson, Arizona, and slowly it grew into a traveling theater troupe, and in 1979, became the television program Magic Mouse Magazine. This led to the creation of The Babysitter's Magic Mouse Storybook, a self-published book done in collaboration with Hilda Terry, creator of the popular newspaper strip Teena. "Some people wanted to revive the Magic Mouse stories," said Terry, "and he wanted me to illustrate them with my teenagers, from when young girls were more innocent. Teena started as a babysitter during WW2."

=== Conversion ===
Later, Matusow converted to the Church of Jesus Christ of Latter-day Saints and moved to Glenwood, Utah, to start the state's first Public-access television cable television program. For a time in the 1980s, after his conversion, he was known as "Job Matusow" and lived with his wife, Emily, in Warwick, Massachusetts. Job and Emily sparked controversy when they allowed members of the Unification Church to live on their land. He made chimes out of melted ammunition and bomb shells during this time and also became involved in collecting clothes for the Rosebud Sioux Reservation in South Dakota.

== Later life and death ==
In 2001, Matusow moved to Claremont, New Hampshire, to run the town's public-access television studio. On January 2, 2002, he was involved in a car accident, and died from complications of the resulting injuries at his home on January 17, at the age of 75.

== Personal life ==
Matusow was married "around a dozen" times, according to his obituary in The New York Times. His first wife was Arvilla Peterson Bentley, a McCarthy supporter, and his last wife was Irene Gibson, who he married in the fall of 2001. He had a daughter.

== See also ==
- Jencks v. United States
