= United States v. Brechner =

American legal case

- Court: United States Court of Appeals for the Second Circuit
- Full case name: United States v. Milton Brechner
- Argued: April 19, 1996
- Decided: November 1, 1996
- Citations: 99 F.3d 96; 79 A.F.T.R.2d 97-878; 65 USLW 2351; 96-2 USTC (CCH) ¶ 50,582

Court membership
- Judges sitting: Roger Miner, Joseph M. McLaughlin, Pierre N. Leval

Case opinions
- Majority: Leval, joined by a unanimous court

Laws applied
- United States Sentencing Guidelines

United States v. Brechner, 99 F.3d 96 (2d Cir. 1996), is a Second Circuit Court of Appeals decision holding that a defendant's failure to provide entirely truthful information pursuant to a plea agreement is a legitimate basis for prosecutors to revoke a promise to move for a downward departure at sentencing.

== Background ==
Milton Brechner was president of a company that manufactured stuffed toy animals for sale to carnivals. The government determined that he used this company to engage in extensive tax fraud schemes, by both failing to report income from customers and, it was later determined, by receiving kickbacks from suppliers in return for paying inflated invoices.

In January 1992, Brechner agreed to plead guilty to four counts of income tax evasion in exchange for prosecutors agreeing not to charge Brechner's company or his family for their involvement in the schemes. In May 1992, Brechner contacted the Assistant U.S. Attorney in charge of the investigation and offered to provide information about a corrupt bank officer Brechner had bribed. In exchange, Brechner asked for a downward departure on his sentence. A written agreement was executed, in which Brechner agreed to give "truthful, complete, and accurate information" and the U.S. Attorney agreed to move for a downward sentencing departure under § 5K1.1 of the United States Sentencing Guidelines. However, the agreement cautioned that "Should it be judged by the [U.S Attorney's] Office that the defendant has failed to cooperate fully, has intentionally given false, misleading, or incomplete information or testimony… or has otherwise violated any provision of this agreement, the defendant will not be released from his plea of guilty but this Office will be released from its obligation under this agreement … [to file the § 5K1.1 motion]."

Brechner participated in the government's bribery investigation of the bank officer for over a year. The bank officer was arrested in September 1993. At a debriefing session following the arrest, Brechner was questioned by the Assistant U.S. Attorney about receiving kickbacks from suppliers. Brechner initially denied receiving any such payments, but after the session was stopped by his lawyer and the two of them conferred, Brechner admitted to the kickbacks.

After the debriefing, the Assistant indicated that he was not inclined to move for a downward departure due to Brechner's deception. At sentencing, the government declined to move for a downward departure. Brechner moved to compel the § 5K1.1 motion. At a hearing on that motion, the district court judge found that Brechner had "cooperated fully and completely" and that his "substantial assistance" warranted a §5K1.1 motion. The government appealed.

== Decision of the Second Circuit Court of Appeals ==
The appellate court focused on the explicit terms of the written agreement, which required that Brechner "provide truthful, complete, and accurate information" and that the government would be released from its obligation to file a §5K1.1 motion if Brechner had "intentionally given false, misleading, or incomplete information." The court stated "By falsely denying his receipt of kickbacks from [the suppliers], Brechner breached his obligations under the agreement. According to the terms of the agreement, the government was expressly entitled to withhold the letter in those circumstances."

The court disagreed with the district court's finding that the breach was not material and Brechner's lies were merely "trivial defects." To the contrary, the Court of Appeals found that "these lies, although swiftly corrected, seriously undermined Brechner's credibility as a potential government witness… By lying to the prosecutor during the period of his cooperation about his own criminal involvement, Brechner made it impossible for the government to argue at any future trial that, despite his past sins, Brechner had acknowledged his guilt, turned over a new leaf and cooperated in a truthful and trustworthy manner." Since the Supreme Court's decision in Giglio v. United States required that defendants have access to information relating to a government witness's credibility and the potential for harsh cross-examination created a serious problem for the government, the court found that Brechner's lies "provided good faith grounds for refusing to move for a downward departure."
