= Police perjury =

False testimony knowingly given by a police officer

In criminal law, police perjury, sometimes informally called "testilying", is the act of a police officer knowingly giving false testimony. It is typically used in a criminal trial to "make the case" against defendants believed by the police to be guilty when irregularities during the suspects' arrest or search threaten to result in their acquittal. It also can be extended to encompass substantive misstatements of fact to convict those whom the police believe to be guilty, procedural misstatements to "justify" a search and seizure, or even the inclusion of statements to frame an innocent citizen. More generically, it has been said to be "[l]ying under oath, especially by a police officer, to help get a conviction."

== United States ==
When police lie under oath, innocent people can be convicted and jailed; hundreds of convictions have been set aside as a result of such police misconduct. Some sources say that it is both a police and a prosecutorial problem and that it is a systemic response to the fruit of the poisonous tree doctrine, which was recognized in the US Supreme Court decision Mapp v. Ohio. Other authors have drawn a connection between perjury and an increased emphasis on the number of arrests and convictions made.

The extent of the practice is debated; journalists, activists, and defense attorneys have exposed numerous instances of false testimony, but police officers and police unions, while acknowledging its occurrence, deny that it is widespread or systemic. The defense attorney Alan Dershowitz argued, in the New York Times and before a congressional hearing, that police perjury is commonplace:

As I read about the disbelief expressed by some prosecutors.... I thought of Claude Rains's classic response, in Casablanca on being told there was gambling in Rick's place: "I'm shocked—shocked." For anyone who has practiced criminal law in the state or Federal courts, the disclosures about rampant police perjury cannot possibly come as a surprise. "Testilying"—as the police call it—has long been an open secret among prosecutors, defense lawyers, and judges.

In 1995, the Boston Globe reported that New York Police Commissioner William J. Bratton had created a furor by saying that he agreed with most of Dershowitz's statement. The Globe quoted Richard Bradley, then-president of the Boston Police Patrolmen's Association: "I find it incredible that he would say that. Every day all over the country, police officers are testifying. Everyone realizes they are testifying under oath. If this was this much a problem, it would have come to light over the years." Bradley said that in 27 years on the Boston force he had never encountered the practice.

In a 1996 article in the Los Angeles Times, "Has the Drug War Created an Officer Liars' Club?", Joseph D. McNamara, the chief of police of San Jose, said, "Not many people took defense attorney Alan M. Dershowitz seriously when he charged that Los Angeles cops are taught to lie at the birth of their careers at the Police Academy. But as someone who spent 35 years wearing a police uniform, I've come to believe that hundreds of thousands of law-enforcement officers commit felony perjury every year testifying about drug arrests." He also noted, "Within the last few years, police departments in Los Angeles, Boston, New Orleans, San Francisco, Denver, New York and in other large cities have suffered scandals involving police personnel lying under oath about drug evidence."

In 2011, after finding a former police detective, Jason Arbeeny, guilty of official misconduct for planting drugs on a suspect, Justice Gustin L. Reichbach of the New York Supreme Court wrote that he "thought [he] was not naïve, but even this court was shocked, not only by the seeming pervasive scope of misconduct but even more distressingly by the seeming casualness by which such conduct is employed." Arbeeny was then sentenced to five years of probation and 300 hours of community service. Also in 2011, a former San Francisco Police Commissioner, Peter Keane, wrote that lying under oath was a "routine practice" for narcotics officers.

In 2019, the Foreign Intelligence Surveillance Court called out the Federal Bureau of Investigation and the National Security Division of the US Department of Justice for dishonesty in applications for continuance of a wiretap of Carter Page, saying that it called into question the reliability of other evidence submitted by the FBI. The practice was documented in a previous report released by the Department of Justice's Inspector General, Michael Horowitz, and was cited by the court.

Police officers who have been dishonest are sometimes referred to as "Brady cops." In Brady v. Maryland, the US Supreme Court held that prosecutors are required to notify defendants and their attorneys of any favorable evidence, such as if a law enforcement official involved in a case has a sustained record of knowingly lying in an official capacity.

== Remedies ==
A police officer's reputation for trustworthiness is an important asset to their effectiveness; police who have been caught lying to the court make poor witnesses, and previous convictions relying on their testimony can be vacated if their misconduct is pervasive. This can result in termination, and such terminations have been judicially enforced. About a perjured affidavit supporting a raid that killed two, Houston Police Chief Art Acevedo said "that's totally unacceptable. I've told my police department that if you lie, you die. When you lie on an affidavit, that's not sloppy police work, that's a crime."

Some suggest that narrowing or blunting the exclusionary rule may get rid of the incentive for police to lie to the court. That has happened to the extent that the US Supreme Court has recognized exceptions like the "good faith exception." Some argue that civil liability could have a prophylactic effect on police misconduct. Others suggest that the ubiquity of video recordings, both by the police and by civilians, will operate to slow down the misconduct and to reverse the trend.

== See also ==
- Brady material
- Brady v. Maryland
- Jencks Act
- Mark Fuhrman
- Perjury
- Pitchess motion
- Poisoning the well
- Police corruption
- List of wrongful convictions in the United States
- Witness tampering

== Sources ==
- Boston Globe November 15, 1995, Metro section, p. 1: "Bratton calls 'testilying' by police a real concern"
- Fisher, Stanley Z (1993). "Just the Facts, Ma'am: Lying and the Omission of Exculpatory Evidence in Police Reports". New England Law Review. 28: 1.
- Hays, Tom; Long, Colleen. "NYPD whistle-blowers testify at stop-frisk trial". Associated Press/Yahoo News.
- McNamara, Joseph D. (February 11, 1996). "Has the Drug War Created an Officer Liars' Club?". Los Angeles Times.
- Morgan, Cloud] (1994). "The Dirty Little Secret". Emory Law Journal. 43: 1311.
- Slobogin, Christopher (Fall 1996). "Reform The Police: Testilying: Police perjury and what to do about it". University of Colorado Law Review. 67. Boulder, Colorado: University of Colorado Law School: 1037.
