= Perjury =

Falsifying an oath or affirmation

Perjury (also known as forswearing) is the intentional act of swearing a false oath or falsifying an affirmation to tell the truth, whether spoken or in writing, concerning matters material to an official proceeding. (Note: "Perjury The act or an instance of a person's deliberately making material false or misleading statements while under oath. – Also termed false swearing; false oath; archaically forswearing." Garner, Bryan A. (1999). Black's Law Dictionary (7th ed.). St. Paul MN: West Group. p. 1160.)

Like most other crimes in the common law system, to be convicted of perjury one must have had the intention (mens rea) to commit the act and have actually committed the act (actus reus). Further, statements that are facts cannot be considered perjury, even if they might arguably constitute an omission, and it is not perjury to lie about matters that are immaterial to the legal proceeding. Statements that entail an interpretation of fact are not perjury because people often draw inaccurate conclusions unwittingly or make honest mistakes without the intent to deceive. Individuals may have honest but mistaken beliefs about certain facts or their recollection may be inaccurate, or may have a different perception of what is the accurate way to state the truth. In some jurisdictions, no crime has occurred when a false statement is (intentionally or unintentionally) made while under oath or subject to penalty. Instead, criminal culpability attaches only at the instant the declarant falsely asserts the truth of statements (made or to be made) that are material to the outcome of the proceeding. It is not perjury, for example, to lie about one's age except if age is a fact material to influencing the legal result, such as eligibility for old age retirement benefits or whether a person was of an age to have legal capacity.

Perjury is considered a serious offence, as it can be used to usurp the power of the courts, resulting in miscarriages of justice. In Canada, those who commit perjury are guilty of an indictable offence and liable to imprisonment for a term not exceeding fourteen years. Perjury is a statutory offence in England and Wales. A person convicted of perjury is liable to imprisonment for a term not exceeding seven years, or to a fine, or to both. In the United States, the general perjury statute under federal law classifies perjury as a felony and provides for a prison sentence of up to five years. The California Penal Code allows for perjury to be a capital offense in cases causing wrongful execution. Perjury which caused the wrongful execution of another or in the pursuit of causing the wrongful execution of another is respectively construed as murder or attempted murder, and is normally itself punishable by execution in countries that retain the death penalty. Perjury is considered a felony in most U.S. states. However, prosecutions for perjury are rare.

The rules for perjury also apply when a person has made a statement under penalty of perjury even if the person has not been sworn or affirmed as a witness before an appropriate official. An example is the US income tax return, which, by law, must be signed as true and correct under penalty of perjury (see 26 U.S.C. § 6065). Federal tax law provides criminal penalties of up to three years in prison for violation of the tax return perjury statute (see 26 U.S.C. § 7206(1)).

In the United States, Kenya, Scotland and several other English-speaking Commonwealth nations, subornation of perjury, which is attempting to induce another person to commit perjury, is itself a crime.

== Perjury law by jurisdiction ==
=== Australia ===
Perjury is punishable by imprisonment in various states and territories of Australia. In several jurisdictions, longer prison sentences are possible if perjury was committed with the intent of convicting or acquitting a person charged with a serious offence.

- Australian Capital Territory: Perjury is punishable by a fine of up to AU$112,000 or 7 years imprisonment or both. If perjury was committed with the intent of convicting or acquitting someone of an offence which carries a prison sentence, the maximum penalty is AU$224,000 or 14 years imprisonment or both.
- New South Wales: Under Section 327 of the Crimes Act 1900, perjury is punishable by imprisonment of up to 10 years. Under Section 328, if a person commits perjury with the aim of convicting or acquitting a person charged with an offence that carries a prison sentence of 5 years or more, perjury is punishable by imprisonment of up to 14 years.
- Northern Territory: Perjury is punishable by imprisonment of up to 14 years. If perjury was committed to convict someone of an offence that carries life imprisonment, the perjurer can be imprisoned for life.
- Queensland: Perjury is punishable by imprisonment of up to 14 years. If perjury was committed to convict someone of an offence that carries life imprisonment, the perjurer can be imprisoned for life.
- South Australia: Perjury and subornation of perjury is punishable by imprisonment of up to 7 years.
- Tasmania: Perjury is a crime in Tasmania.
- Victoria: Perjury and subornation of perjury is punishable by imprisonment of up to 15 years.
- Western Australia: Under Section 125 of the Criminal Code Act Compilation Act 1913, perjury is punishable by imprisonment of up to 14 years. If perjury was committed to convict someone of an offence that carries life imprisonment, the perjurer can be imprisoned for life.

=== Canada ===
The offence of perjury is codified by section 132 of the Criminal Code. It is defined by section 131, which provides:

(1) Subject to subsection (3), every one commits perjury who, with intent to mislead, makes before a person who is authorized by law to permit it to be made before him a false statement under oath or solemn affirmation, by affidavit, solemn declaration or deposition or orally, knowing that the statement is false.

(1.1) Subject to subsection (3), every person who gives evidence under subsection 46(2) of the Canada Evidence Act, or gives evidence or a statement pursuant to an order made under section 22.2 of the Mutual Legal Assistance in Criminal Matters Act, commits perjury who, with intent to mislead, makes a false statement knowing that it is false, whether or not the false statement was made under oath or solemn affirmation in accordance with subsection (1), so long as the false statement was made in accordance with any formalities required by the law of the place outside Canada in which the person is virtually present or heard.
(2) Subsection (1) applies, whether or not a statement referred to in that subsection is made in a judicial proceeding.

(3) Subsections (1) and (1.1) do not apply to a statement referred to in either of those subsections that is made by a person who is not specially permitted, authorized or required by law to make that statement.

As to corroboration, see section 133.

Everyone who commits perjury is guilty of an indictable offence and liable to imprisonment for a term not exceeding fourteen years.

=== European Union ===
A person who, before the Court of Justice of the European Union, swears anything which they know to be false or do not believe to be true are, whatever their nationality, guilty of perjury. Proceedings for this offence may be taken in any place in the State and the offence may for all incidental purposes be treated as having been committed in that place.

=== India ===
"The offence of perjury finds its place in law by virtue of Section 191 to Section 203 of the Indian Penal Code, 1860 ('IPC'). Unlike many other countries, the offence of perjury is muted on account of Section 195 of the Code of Criminal Procedure, 1973 ("Cr.P.C"). Section 195(1)(b)(i) of the Cr.P.C. restricts any court to take cognisance of an offence of perjury unless the same is by way of a complaint in writing by the court before which the offence is committed or by a superior court."

=== New Zealand ===
Punishment for perjury is defined under Section 109 of the Crimes Act 1961. A person who commits perjury may be imprisoned for up to 7 years. If a person commits perjury to procure the conviction of someone charged with an offence that carries a maximum sentence of not less than 3 years' imprisonment, the perjurer may be imprisoned for up to 14 years.

=== United Kingdom ===
==== England and Wales ====
Perjury is a statutory offence in England and Wales. It is created by section 1(1) of the Perjury Act 1911. Section 1 of that Act reads:

- (1) If any person lawfully sworn as a witness or as an interpreter in a judicial proceeding wilfully makes a statement material in that proceeding, which he knows to be false or does not believe to be true, he shall be guilty of perjury, and shall, on conviction thereof on indictment, be liable to penal servitude for a term not exceeding seven years, or to imprisonment ... for a term not exceeding two years, or to a fine or to both such penal servitude or imprisonment and fine.
- (2) The expression "judicial proceeding" includes a proceeding before any court, tribunal, or person having by law power to hear, receive, and examine evidence on oath.
- (3) Where a statement made for the purposes of a judicial proceeding is not made before the tribunal itself, but is made on oath before a person authorised by law to administer an oath to the person who makes the statement, and to record or authenticate the statement, it shall, for the purposes of this section, be treated as having been made in a judicial proceeding.
- (4) A statement made by a person lawfully sworn in England for the purposes of a judicial proceeding—
  - (a) in another part of His Majesty's dominions; or
  - (b) in a British tribunal lawfully constituted in any place by sea or land outside His Majesty's dominions; or
  - (c) in a tribunal of any foreign state,
  shall, for the purposes of this section, be treated as a statement made in a judicial proceeding in England.
- (5) Where, for the purposes of a judicial proceeding in England, a person is lawfully sworn under the authority of an Act of Parliament—
  - (a) in any other part of His Majesty's dominions; or
  - (b) before a British tribunal or a British officer in a foreign country, or within the jurisdiction of the Admiralty of England;
  a statement made by such person so sworn as aforesaid (unless the Act of Parliament under which it was made otherwise specifically provides) shall be treated for the purposes of this section as having been made in the judicial proceeding in England for the purposes whereof it was made.
- (6) The question whether a statement on which perjury is assigned was material is a question of law to be determined by the court of trial.

The words omitted from section 1(1) were repealed by section 1(2) of the Criminal Justice Act 1948. Section 1(1) of that Act also abolished penal servitude; such sentences are construed as sentences of imprisonment instead.

A person guilty of an offence under section 11(1) of the European Communities Act 1972 (i.e. perjury before the Court of Justice of the European Union) could be proceeded against and punished in England and Wales as for an offence under section 1(1). Section 1(4) had effect in relation to proceedings in the Court of Justice of the European Union as it has effect in relation to a judicial proceeding in a tribunal of a foreign state. Due to Brexit, the United Kingdom is no longer subject to that court's jurisdiction and the 1972 Act has been repealed in its entirety.

Section 1(4) applies in relation to proceedings before a relevant convention court under the European Patent Convention as it applies to a judicial proceeding in a tribunal of a foreign state.

A statement made on oath by a witness outside the United Kingdom and given in evidence through a live television link by virtue of section 32 of the Criminal Justice Act 1988 must be treated for the purposes of section 1 as having been made in the proceedings in which it is given in evidence.

Section 1 applies in relation to a person acting as an intermediary as it applies in relation to a person lawfully sworn as an interpreter in a judicial proceeding; and for this purpose, where a person acts as an intermediary in any proceeding which is not a judicial proceeding for the purposes of section 1, that proceeding must be taken to be part of the judicial proceeding in which the witness's evidence is given.

Where any statement made by a person on oath in any proceeding which is not a judicial proceeding for the purposes of section 1 is received in evidence in pursuance of a special measures direction, that proceeding must be taken for the purposes of section 1 to be part of the judicial proceeding in which the statement is so received in evidence.

===== "Judicial proceeding" =====
The definition in section 1(2) is not "comprehensive".

The book Archbold says that it appears to be immaterial whether the court before which the statement is made has jurisdiction in the particular cause in which the statement is made, because there is no express requirement in the Act that the court be one of "competent jurisdiction" and because the definition in section 1(2) does not appear to require this by implication either.

===== Actus reus =====
The actus reus of perjury might be considered to be the making of a statement, whether true or false, on oath in a judicial proceeding, where the person knows the statement to be false or believes it to be false.

Perjury is a conduct crime.

===== Mode of trial =====
Perjury is triable only on indictment.

===== Sentence =====
A person convicted of perjury is liable to imprisonment for a term not exceeding seven years, or to a fine, or to both.

The following cases are relevant:

- R v Hall (1982) 4 Cr App R (S) 153
- R v Knight, 6 Cr App R (S) 31, [1984] Crim LR 304, CA
- R v Healey (1990) 12 Cr App R (S) 297
- R v Dunlop [2001] 2 Cr App R (S) 27
- R v Archer [2002] EWCA Crim 1996, [2003] 1 Cr App R (S) 86
- R v Adams [2004] 2 Cr App R (S) 15
- R v Cunningham [2007] 2 Cr App R (S) 61

See also the Crown Prosecution Service sentencing manual.

===== History =====
In Anglo-Saxon legal procedure, the offence of perjury could only be committed by both jurors and by compurgators. With time witnesses began to appear in court they were not so treated despite the fact that their functions were akin to that of modern witnesses. This was due to the fact that their role were not yet differentiated from those of the juror and so evidence or perjury by witnesses was not made a crime. Even in the 14th century, when witnesses started appearing before the jury to testify, perjury by them was not made a punishable offence. The maxim then was that every witness's evidence on oath was true. Perjury by witnesses began to be punished before the end of the 15th century by the Star Chamber.

The immunity enjoyed by witnesses began also to be whittled down or interfered with by the Parliament in England in 1540 with subornation of perjury and, in 1562, with perjury proper. The punishment for the offence then was in the nature of monetary penalty, recoverable in a civil action and not by penal sanction. In 1613, the Star Chamber declared perjury by a witness to be a punishable offence at common law.

Prior to the 1911 Act, perjury was governed by section 3 of the Maintenance and Embracery Act 1540, 32 Hen. 8 c. 9 (An Act for the Punyshement of suche persones as shall procure or comit any wyllful Perjurye; repealed 1967), and the Perjury Act 1728 (2 Geo. 2 c. 25).

===== Materiality =====
The requirement that the statement be material can be traced back to and has been credited to Edward Coke, who said:

For if it be not material, then though it be false, yet it is no perjury, because it concerneth not the point in suit, and therefore in effect it is extra-judicial. Also this act giveth remedy to the party grieved, and if the deposition be not material, he cannot be grieved thereby.

==== Northern Ireland ====
Perjury is a statutory offence in Northern Ireland. It is created by article 3(1) of the Perjury (Northern Ireland) Order 1979 (S.I. 1979/1714 (N.I. 19)). This replaces the Perjury Act (Northern Ireland) 1946 (c. 13) (N.I.).

=== United States ===
Perjury operates in American law as an inherited principle of the common law of England, which defined the act as the "willful and corrupt giving, upon a lawful oath, or in any form allowed by law to be substituted for an oath, in a judicial proceeding or course of justice, of a false testimony material to the issue or matter of inquiry".

William Blackstone touched on the subject in his Commentaries on the Laws of England, establishing perjury as "a crime committed when a lawful oath is administered, in some judicial proceeding, to a person who swears willfully, absolutely, and falsely, in a matter material to the issue or point in question". The punishment for perjury under the common law has varied from death to banishment and has included such grotesque penalties as severing the tongue of the perjurer. The definitional structure of perjury provides an important framework for legal proceedings, as the component parts of this definition have permeated jurisdictional lines, finding a home in American legal constructs. As such, the main tenets of perjury, including mens rea, a lawful oath, occurring during a judicial proceeding, a false testimony have remained necessary pieces of perjury's definition in the United States.

==== Statutory definitions ====
Perjury's current position in the American legal system takes the form of state and federal statutes. Most notably, the United States Code prohibits perjury, which is defined in two senses for federal purposes as someone who:

(1) Having taken an oath before a competent tribunal, officer, or person, in any case in which a law of the United States authorizes an oath to be administered, that he will testify, declare, depose, or certify truly, or that any written testimony, declaration, deposition, or certificate by him subscribed, is true, willfully and contrary to such oath states or subscribes any material matter which he does not believe to be true; or (2) in any declaration, certificate, verification, or statement under penalty of perjury as permitted under section 1746 of title 28, United States Code, willfully subscribes as true any material matter which he does not believe to be true

The above statute provides for a fine and/or up to five years in prison as punishment. Within federal jurisdiction, statements made in two broad categories of judicial proceedings may qualify as perjurious: 1) Federal official proceedings, and 2) Federal Court or Grand Jury proceedings. A third type of perjury entails the procurement of perjurious statements from another person. More generally, the statement must occur in the "course of justice", but this definition leaves room open for interpretation.

One particularly precarious aspect of the phrasing is that it entails knowledge of the accused person's perception of the truthful nature of events and not necessarily the actual truth of those events. There is a distinction between giving a false statement under oath and merely misstating a fact accidentally, but the distinction can be especially difficult to discern in court of law.

==== Precedents ====
The development of perjury law in the United States centers on United States v. Dunnigan, a seminal case that set out the parameters of perjury within United States law. The court uses the Dunnigan-based legal standard to determine if an accused person: "testifying under oath or affirmation violates this section if she gives false testimony concerning a material matter with the willful intent to provide false testimony, rather than as a result of confusion, mistake, or faulty memory." However, a defendant shown to be willfully ignorant may in fact be eligible for perjury prosecution.

Dunnigan distinction manifests its importance with regard to the relation between two component parts of perjury's definition: in willfully giving a false statement, a person must understand that she is giving a false statement to be considered a perjurer under the Dunnigan framework. Deliberation on the part of the defendant is required for a statement to constitute perjury. Jurisprudential developments in the American law of perjury have revolved around the facilitation of "perjury prosecutions and thereby enhance the reliability of testimony before federal courts and grand juries".

With that goal in mind, Congress has sometimes expanded the grounds on which an individual may be prosecuted for perjury, with section 1623 of the United States Code recognizing the utterance of two mutually incompatible statements as grounds for perjury indictment even if neither can unequivocally be proven false. However, the two statements must be so mutually incompatible that at least one must necessarily be false; it is irrelevant whether the false statement can be specifically identified from among the two. It thus falls on the government to show that a defendant (a) knowingly made a (b) false (c) material statement (d) under oath (e) in a legal proceeding. The proceedings can be ancillary to normal court proceedings, and thus, even such menial interactions as bail hearings can qualify as protected proceedings under this statute.

Wilfulness is an element of the offense. The mere existence of two mutually-exclusive factual statements is not sufficient to prove perjury; the prosecutor nonetheless has the duty to plead and prove that the statement was willfully made. Mere contradiction will not sustain the charge; there must be strong corroborative evidence of the contradiction.

One significant legal distinction lies in the specific realm of knowledge necessarily possessed by a defendant for her statements to be properly called perjury. Though the defendant must knowingly render a false statement in a legal proceeding or under federal jurisdiction, the defendant need not know that they are speaking under such conditions for the statement to constitute perjury. All tenets of perjury qualification persist: the "knowingly" aspect of telling the false statement simply does not apply to the defendant's knowledge about the person whose deception is intended.

==== Materiality ====
The evolution of United States perjury law has experienced the most debate with regards to the materiality requirement. Fundamentally, statements that are literally true cannot provide the basis for a perjury charge (as they do not meet the falsehood requirement) just as answers to truly ambiguous statements cannot constitute perjury. However, such fundamental truths of perjury law become muddled when discerning the materiality of a given statement and the way in which it was material to the given case. In United States v. Brown, the court defined material statements as those with "a natural tendency to influence, or is capable of influencing, the decision of the decision-making body to be addressed", such as a jury or grand jury.

While courts have specifically made clear certain instances that have succeeded or failed to meet the nebulous threshold for materiality, the topic remains unresolved in large part, except in certain legal areas where intent manifests itself in an abundantly clear fashion, such as with the so-called perjury trap, a specific situation in which a prosecutor calls a person to testify before a grand jury with the intent of drawing a perjurious statement from the person being questioned.

==== Defense of recantation ====
Despite a tendency of US perjury law toward broad prosecutory power under perjury statutes, American perjury law has afforded potential defendants a new form of defense not found in the English common law. This defense requires that an individual admit to making a perjurious statement during that same proceeding and recanting the statement. Though this defensive loophole slightly narrows the types of cases which may be prosecuted for perjury, the effect of this statutory defense is to promote a truthful retelling of facts by witnesses, thus helping to ensure the reliability of American court proceedings just as broadened perjury statutes aimed to do.

==== Subornation of perjury ====
Subornation of perjury stands as a subset of US perjury laws and prohibits an individual from inducing another to commit perjury. Subornation of perjury entails equivalent possible punishments as perjury on the federal level. The crime requires an extra level of satisfactory proof, as prosecutors must show not only that perjury occurred but also that the defendant positively induced said perjury. Furthermore, the inducing defendant must know that the suborned statement is a false, perjurious statement.

== Notable convicted perjurers ==
- Jonathan Aitken, British politician, was sentenced to 18 months' imprisonment in 1999 for perjury.
- Jeffrey Archer, British novelist and politician, was sentenced to 4 years' imprisonment for perjury in 2001.
- Kwame Kilpatrick, Detroit mayor was convicted of perjury in 2008.
- Marion Jones, American track and field athlete, was sentenced to 6 months' imprisonment after being found guilty of two counts of perjury in 2008.
- Mark Fuhrman, Los Angeles Police Department detective, entered a no contest plea to a perjury charge relating to his testimony in the murder trial of O. J. Simpson. This was one of the seminal occurrences of perjury by a police officer.
- Alger Hiss, American government official who was accused of being a Soviet spy in 1948 and convicted of perjury in connection with this charge in 1950.
- Lil' Kim, American rapper was convicted of perjury in 2005 after lying to a grand jury in 2003 about a February 2001 shooting. She was sentenced to one year and one day of imprisonment.
- Lewis "Scooter" Libby, was convicted in 2007 of two counts of perjury in connection with the Plame affair.
- Bernie Madoff, the former chairman of the NASDAQ stock exchange, in 2009 was found guilty of perjury in relation to investment fraud arising from his operating a Ponzi scheme.
- Michele Sindona, convicted of perjury related to a bogus kidnapping in August 1979.
- Tommy Sheridan, Scottish politician, found guilty of lying on affirmation in a trial in 2010.
- John Waller, British highwayman, known for his death while being pilloried for perjury in 1732
- Pritam Singh, a Workers' Party (WP) MP for Aljunied Group Representation Constituency since 2011 and secretary-general since 2018, found guilty of lying on affirmation in the Committee of Parliament on two occasions during the resignation of another WP legislator Raeesah Khan in November 2021. At the time of the conviction, Singh was the de jure Opposition Leader and a non-practicing lawyer. In 2026, Singh was stripped of both positions, though retaining him as MP.

== Allegations of perjury ==
Excerpt of James Clapper's testimony to Congress on NSA surveillance programs

Notable people who have been accused of perjury include:

- Barry Bonds was indicted by a federal grand jury for allegedly perjuring himself in testimony denying the use of performance-enhancing drugs. The perjury charges were later dropped after a deadlock by the trial jury.
- Former U.S. President Bill Clinton was accused of perjury in the Clinton–Lewinsky scandal and as a result was impeached by the House of Representatives on 19 December 1998. No criminal charges were ever brought and upon leaving office he accepted immunity.
- Andy Coulson, British journalist and political aide, was cleared of perjury charges in the News International phone hacking scandal, because his questioned testimony was ruled immaterial.
- Michael Hayden, the former director of the Central Intelligence Agency (CIA), has been accused of lying to Congress during his 2007 testimony about the CIA's enhanced interrogation techniques.
- Keith B. Alexander, the former director of the National Security Agency (NSA), had told Congress in 2012 that "we don't hold data on US citizens".
- James R. Clapper, the former Director of National Intelligence, was accused of perjury for telling a congressional committee in March 2013, that the National Security Agency does not collect any type of data at all on millions of Americans.

== See also ==
- Brady material
- False confession
- Forced confession
- Horkos
- Lies (evidence)
- Making false statements
- Obstruction of justice
- Performativity
- Pitchess motion
- Statutory declaration
- Testilying
