= Walt Conley =

American singer

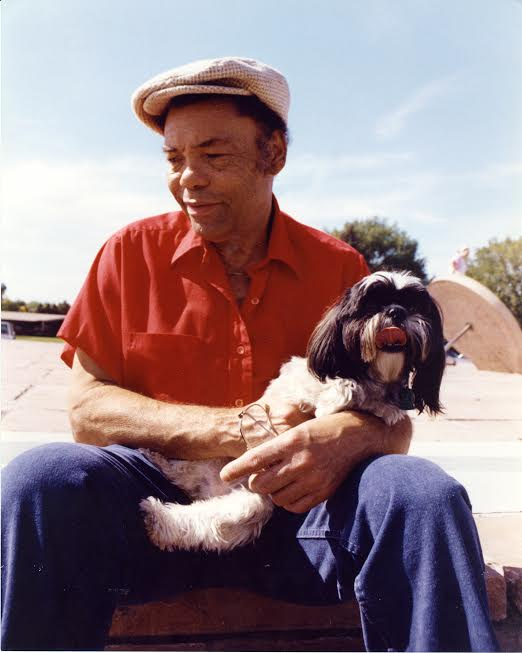
- Born: May 20, 1929; Denver, Colorado, US
- Died: November 16, 2003 (aged 74); Denver, Colorado, US
- Occupations: folk singer Hollywood actor Voice actor Owner of Denver folk venue Conley's Nostalgia
- Musical career
- Genres: Folk

Walter Bell Conley (May 20, 1929 – November 16, 2003) was an American folk singer, Hollywood actor, voice actor, and owner of Denver's folk venue Conley's Nostalgia. The Rocky Mountain News described Conley as the founding father of Denver's folk scene, which began in the late 1950s and stretched into the mid-1960s. Conley shared stages with, and opened for, Josh White, Cisco Houston, Mama Cass Elliot, Floyd Red Crow Westerman, and Judy Collins, among many others. Conley also opened his home to a young and unknown Bob Dylan in the summer of 1960, and introduced Denver to the little-known Smothers Brothers that same year. As the owner of Conley's Nostalgia, Walt brought in big-name performers such as John Fahey and Dave Van Ronk. To those who worked with him, knew him, and wrote about him, he is referred to as Denver's "Grandfather of Folk Music." Conley remained an entertainer until his death from a massive stroke at the age of 74. At the time of his death, Conley was married to Joan Holden. Conley had four children from previous relationships.

== Family and early life ==
Conley (born Billy Robinson) was born in Denver, Colorado. He was raised in Scottsbluff, Nebraska, by adoptive parents who gave him the name Walter Bell Conley. After his father died, Walt and his mother moved to Denver where he attended Manual High School and eventually received a football scholarship to Northeastern Junior College in Sterling, Colorado. During summer breaks as a student, Conley worked at a ranch in San Cristobal, New Mexico, owned by Jenny and Craig Vincent. Jenny Vincent was a respected folk-singer who performed with Pete Seeger, Woody Guthrie, Malvina Reynolds, and Earl Robinson. It was during one of those summers at the ranch that Conley met Pete Seeger and other members of The Weavers, a popular 1950s folk group. It was Pete Seeger who assisted Walt in buying his first guitar, convincing Conley to use his rich baritone to perform as a folk singer. Shortly after college, Conley enlisted in the Navy during the Korean War conflict. After he was discharged, Conley joined a film crew shooting the 1954 film Salt of the Earth. Conley then attended the University of Northern Colorado, then known as the Colorado State College of Education, where he majored in Theater and Physical Education. After graduating Conley had a brief career in teaching until this position clashed with his ambitions as an entertainer.

== Musician: the late 1950s and 1960s ==
Conley's first professional folk singing job was at the Windsor Hotel in Denver playing calypso songs. The hotel contained three bars and Conley was often booked in all three bars on the same night. He would sing a few songs in one, then rush upstairs to play another bar, and then rush to the third bar. Conley's next job was at a premiere folk venue in Denver called Little Bohemia. There he met a young folk musician and Denver native named Judy Collins. Collins was also playing at another folk venue in Boulder, Colorado, called Michael's Pub, and soon Conley added this venue to his list of places to perform. In 1959 a Denver businessman with a passion for folk music named Hal Neustaedter opened a folk venue called Exodus, which brought in headline acts such as Josh White, Bob Gibson, The Terriers, Jimmy Driftwood, and many others. Neustaedter asked Conley to be the opening act for six months of the year. Judy Collins was booked as opening act for the other six months. During this time, Conley also spent a lot of time in Aspen, Colorado, where the folk scene was vibrant with new groups such as The Limeliters. It was in Aspen that Conley met the Smothers Brothers, whom he booked while managing the Satire Club in Denver that same year. This was the Smothers Brothers' first appearance in Denver. It was also while managing the Satire that Conley was approached by a young unknown named Bob Dylan who had left Minnesota to try find a place for himself in Denver's growing folk community. Conley allowed Dylan to open for the Smothers Brothers for a brief period of time before Dylan made his way back to Minnesota. Conley eventually gave up his job at the Satire and returned to performing exclusively at the Exodus.

== Hollywood actor: the 1970s ==
As the folk music scene in Denver, and the United States, began to fade, Conley left Denver for Hollywood in the early 1970s to try his hand at acting. He was offered minor roles in some popular TV shows of that time such as Get Christy Love!, The Rockford Files, and The Six Million Dollar Man, in which Conley played Dr. Lomax. Conley also appeared in feature films, such as Prison for Children, and made a living doing voice-overs for TV commercials and films, including The Longest Yard, for which he supplied all the grunts and groans during a rough football game. He also read the Indian Lord's Prayer that aired when Denver TV stations signed off at night, in a ritual that prompted a letter of praise from President Nixon. Throughout his years as an actor Conley also continued to perform folk songs in Pasadena, Chicago, and Denver.

== Conley's Nostalgia: the 1980s ==
In 1983, Conley returned to Denver to open his own club. He named it Conley's Nostalgia and it became a magnet for folk musicians in Denver. Conley booked national talent such as Bob Gibson, Dave Van Ronk, and John Fahey, along with local talent. Conley regularly booked the Denver group Juice O'The Barley at the club. Juice O'The Barley played Celtic music, and Conley found himself increasingly drawn to the genre and developed a passion for performing Irish folk music himself.

== Conley & Company: the 1990s ==
With its engaging rhythm and politically nuanced messages, Irish music reminded Conley of the folk singers he idolized such as Pete Seeger, Lead Belly, Woody Guthrie, Merle Travis, and Doc Watson. By 1995, when Conley celebrated 35 years as a professional musician by holding a fundraiser for the Rocky Mountain Music Association, he was performing mostly Irish music. Conley then formed the Irish pub band Conley & Company, which consisted of an assortment of local musicians that would accompany Conley during performances. Conley continued to do solo performances as well and remained an entertainer until his death from a massive stroke at the age of 74. The band Conley & Company continued on as Juice o'the Barley after he died.

== Discography ==
Albums

- Folk Festival at the Exodus, Vol. 1 (LP) (1959; Sky Lark Recording)
- Passin' Through with Walt Conley (LP) (1961; Premiere Records)
- Listen What He's Sayin' (LP) (Unknown release date; Studio City Records)
- After All These Years (LP) (1991)
- Conley & Company Do The Sheabeen Pub (2001)
- Black & Tans (2002)

Singles

- Colorado Story (45) (1959; Band Box Records)
- Colorado, Queen of the West (45) (1959; Band Box Records)
- Passin' Through (45) (1960; Band Box Records)
- Worried Man Blues (45) (1960; Band Box Records)
- Ballad of the Walking Postman (45) (1960; All American Records)

== Legacy ==
Publications that examine or discuss the Denver folk music scene, particularly with those that took part in it locally such as Judy Collins and the Smothers Brothers, or those national acts that passed through town on their way to fame consistently note Conley's influence and status in the history of folk music in this region. An annual benefit concert is put on each year to celebrate Walt's life and work. The Colorado Music Hall of Fame has been petitioned to include Walt Conley among its inductees.

Conley was inducted into the Colorado Music Hall of Fame on November 9, 2019.
