= Clinton Jencks =

American activist (1918–2005)

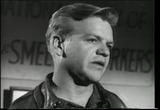
- Clinton Jencks in Salt of the Earth
- Born: March 1, 1918; Colorado Springs, Colorado, United States
- Died: December 15, 2005 (aged 87)
- Occupations: labor and social justice activist

Clinton Jencks (March 1, 1918 – December 15, 2005) was an American lifelong activist in labor and social justice causes, most famous for union organizing among New Mexico's miners, acting in the 1954 film Salt of the Earth (where he portrayed "Frank Barnes", a character based on himself), and enduring years of government prosecution (and persecution) for allegedly falsifying a Taft-Hartley non-communist affidavit.

== Biography ==
=== Early years ===
Jencks was born March 1, 1918, in Colorado Springs, Colorado. His father was a mail carrier and his mother an active member of the Methodist Church. He graduated with a bachelor's degree in economics from the University of Colorado at Boulder in 1939, then moved to St. Louis, where he became active in the Interfaith Youth Council and met his future wife, Virginia Derr. Jencks served in the Air Force during World War II, and after his honorable discharge he worked at Asarco's Globe Smelter in Denver. Jencks joined the International Union of Mine, Mill and Smelter Workers (called Mine and Mill or Mine-Mill), a radical union of metal miners. Impressed with the Jenckses' commitment and charisma, Mine-Mill sent them to New Mexico in 1946.

=== Mine-Mill in New Mexico ===
The Jencks' years in New Mexico were marked by an upsurge of local Chicano labor activism at the same time that left-wing unions were withstanding employer offensives, anticommunist legislation, and attacks by other unions. Clinton and Virginia Jencks helped consolidate a Chicano leadership of Mine-Mill Local 890 and encouraged miners' wives to participate in union affairs.

In 1950, the same year that the Congress of Industrial Organizations (CIO) expelled Mine-Mill for alleged communist domination, New Mexican miners went out on strike at the Empire Zinc Company in Hanover, New Mexico. This strike began over wages, benefits, and safety, but when the company secured a court injunction prohibiting miners from picketing, miners' wives took over the picket lines. What followed was a dramatic confrontation between the union and the company, and an equally dramatic set of confrontations between husbands and wives, who were at odds over women's activism and the threat it posed to men's household authority. Both Clinton and Virginia Jencks supported the women. Local 890 won the strike in 1952 largely because of the women's picket.

=== Salt of the Earth ===
Clinton Jencks in Salt of the Earth.

Meanwhile, blacklisted Hollywood filmmakers Herbert Biberman and Paul Jarrico were looking for a story to dramatize in an independent feature film, and they happened upon the women's picket when Jarrico and his wife Sylvia met the Jenckses at a dude ranch in northern New Mexico in the summer of 1951. Academy Award-winning screenwriter Michael Wilson wrote the script for Salt of the Earth in 1952, union families critiqued it, and Wilson changed it to reflect their sensibilities. Union men, women, and children played most of the roles in this highly unusual collaboration. Salt of the Earth, however, was heavily suppressed during and after production by anti-communists in Hollywood and Washington.

In October 1952, the Senate Internal Security Subcommittee (SISS) called on Clinton Jencks to testify in its hearings on communism in Mine-Mill, and on April 23, 1953, during the furor over the production of Salt of the Earth, federal agents arrested him on charges of falsifying a noncommunist affidavit he had signed in 1950. He went to trial in federal court in January 1954 and was convicted, largely on the testimony of Harvey Matusow, a paid informant for the Federal Bureau of Investigation (FBI). Matusow later recanted his story, and while his recantation failed to help Jencks win on appeal, by the time Jencks's case was heard by the U.S. Supreme Court in 1957 the entire system of paid informants had been discredited.

In Jencks v. United States, a landmark decision that later played a minor role in the Watergate prosecutions, the Court overturned Jencks's conviction and held that defense counsel had the right to see FBI reports. After this decision, the United States Congress enacted a law directing the federal courts to provide to the defense, documents used by government employees and agents testifying in federal criminal trials. This law came to known as the Jencks Act. The usual remedy for failure to provide these documents is dismissal of the criminal charges. (See United States v. Reynolds.)

While Jencks pursued his appeal, Mine-Mill took him out of New Mexico and ultimately asked for his resignation. Jencks found himself blacklisted from employment throughout the Southwest, but in the early 1960s, he won a Woodrow Wilson fellowship to study economics at the University of California, Berkeley. He completed his doctorate and taught at San Diego State University until his retirement.

=== Later life and death ===
Clinton Jencks continued his social activism as a member of the Democratic Socialists of America until his death on December 15, 2005, at the age of 87.
