= Kyles v. Whitley =

- Supreme Court of the United States

Argued November 7, 1994 Decided April 19, 1995
- Full case name: Curtis Lee Kyles, Petitioner v. John P. Whitley, Warden
- Citations: 514 U.S. 419 (more) 115 S. Ct. 1555; 131 L. Ed. 2d 490; 1995 U.S. LEXIS 2845; 63 U.S.L.W. 4303; 95 Cal. Daily Op. Service 2841; 95 Daily Journal DAR 4952; 8 Fla. L. Weekly Fed. S 686

Case history
- Prior: 5 F.3d 806 (5th Cir. 1993), cert. granted, 511 U.S. 1051 (1994).
- Subsequent: Remanded, 54 F.3d 243 (5th Cir. 1995).

Holding
- A prosecutor has an affirmative duty to disclose evidence favorable to a defendant.

Court membership
- Chief Justice William Rehnquist Associate Justices John P. Stevens · Sandra Day O'Connor; Antonin Scalia · Anthony Kennedy; David Souter · Clarence Thomas; Ruth Bader Ginsburg · Stephen Breyer

Case opinions
- Majority: Souter, joined by Stevens, O'Connor, Ginsburg, Breyer
- Concurrence: Stevens, joined by Ginsburg, Breyer
- Dissent: Scalia, joined by Rehnquist, Kennedy, Thomas

Laws applied
- U.S. Const. amend. XIV

Kyles v. Whitley, 514 U.S. 419 (1995), is a United States Supreme Court case that held that a prosecutor has an affirmative duty to disclose evidence favorable to a defendant pursuant to Brady v. Maryland and United States v. Bagley.

== Background ==
An elderly woman was shot in her temple after doing some food shopping at a Schwegmann Brothers in New Orleans, Louisiana. The gunman took her keys and drove away. James Joseph, an informant to the police, claimed to have purchased the car from Curtis Kyles on the day of the murder. Fearing that the car he purchased was fruit of the crime, he called the police to inform them of the circumstances. The informant's name had changed from James Joseph in his first communication to the police to Joseph Banks, and finally to Joseph Wallace (also known as Beanie.) Also his story changed when he met with police in-person. He provided incriminating character evidence about the defendant. The defendant appealed his conviction for first degree murder claiming that the state knew of evidence favorable to him before and during trial that it failed to disclose. The state supreme court remanded the case for an evidentiary hearing on the defendant's claims of newly discovered evidence. The trial court, after review, denied relief.

The state supreme court denied petitioner's application for discretionary review. A petition for habeas corpus was then filed in district court, which denied the petition. The court of appeals affirmed by a divided vote. The Supreme Court granted cert and reversed and ordered a new trial holding that the net effect of the evidence withheld by the State in this case raised a reasonable probability that its disclosure would have produced a different result. A search of his house revealed the following evidence: purse in the trash, dog food, receipt, gun by the stove, holster and bullets. The defense tried to show that Beanie had set him up and planted the evidence for the purpose of earning money and removing an obstacle from a girl of his romantic interest. Further, defense contended that police were incompetent and the eyewitnesses were mistaken and there were alibi witnesses.

Kyles was convicted of murder. Beanie was the main person who originally inculpated Kyles even though later there were many eyewitnesses who identified Kyles as the murderer. The police/state never disclosed to the defense inconsistent statements made by Beanie, statements made by Beanie where he incriminated himself, inconsistent descriptions made by the eyewitnesses, and several other pieces of potentially exculpatory evidence.

== Opinion of the Court ==
The Court held that Kyles should be granted a new trial. The Court noted Brady v. Maryland (1963), which held that the suppression by the prosecution of evidence favorable to an accused upon request violates due process where the evidence is material either to guilt or to punishment, irrespective of the good faith or bad faith of the prosecution.

The Court also discussed United States v. Bagley (1985) and the reasonable probability of a different result standard. "The question is not whether the defendant would more likely than not have received a different verdict with the evidence, but whether in its absence he received a fair trial, understood as a trial resulting in a verdict worthy of confidence." It noted that this test was not a sufficiency of the evidence test. "A defendant need not demonstrate that after discounting the inculpatory evidence in light of the undisclosed evidence, there would not have been enough left to convict." Finally, the Court noted that the evidence must be considered in whole, not piece by piece. Ultimately, the Court found that based on the evidence that was not brought to light, a reasonable juror could have found Kyles not guilty.

== See also ==
- List of United States Supreme Court cases, volume 514
- List of United States Supreme Court cases
- Lists of United States Supreme Court cases by volume
- List of United States Supreme Court cases by the Rehnquist Court
