= Brady disclosure =

Evidence that is material to the guilt or innocence or to the punishment of a defendant

In the legal system of the United States, a Brady disclosure consists of exculpatory or impeaching information and evidence that is material to the guilt or innocence or to the punishment of a defendant. The term comes from the 1963 U.S. Supreme Court case Brady v. Maryland, in which the Supreme Court ruled that suppression by the prosecution of evidence favorable to a defendant who has requested it violates due process.

Following Brady, the prosecutor must disclose evidence or information that would prove the innocence of the defendant or would enable the defense to more effectively impeach the credibility of government witnesses. Evidence that would serve to reduce the defendant's sentence must also be disclosed by the prosecution. In practice, this doctrine has often proved difficult to enforce. Some states have established their own laws to try to strengthen enforcement against prosecutorial misconduct in this area.

== Definition of the Brady rule ==
The Brady doctrine is a pretrial discovery rule that was established by the United States Supreme Court in Brady v. Maryland (1963). The rule requires that the prosecution must turn over all exculpatory evidence to the defendant in a criminal case. Exculpatory evidence is evidence that might exonerate the defendant. Withholding such information from the defendant is called a Brady violation. This would include the prosecution suppressing evidence that was favorable to the defense, the suppressed evidence being material, and there being a reasonable probability of changing the outcome of the trial.

== Examples ==
Examples include the following:

- The prosecutor must disclose an agreement not to prosecute a witness in exchange for the witness's testimony.
- The prosecutor must disclose leniency (or preferential treatment) agreements made with witnesses in exchange for testimony.
- The prosecutor must disclose exculpatory evidence known only to the police. That is, the prosecutor has a duty to communicate with the police and establish regular procedures by which the police inform the prosecutor's office of anything that tends to prove the innocence of the defendant. Not all exculpatory evidence is required to be disclosed by the Brady line of cases; only evidence that is "material to guilt or punishment" must be disclosed because its disclosure would create a reasonable probability of changing the outcome of the proceeding. The prosecutor is not obligated to personally review police files in search of exculpatory information when the defendant asks for it, but to allow the defense reasonable access. The Supreme Court observed in Strickler v. Greene, "Thus the term 'Brady violation' is sometimes used to refer to any breach of the broad obligation to disclose exculpatory evidence – that is, to any suppression of so-called 'Brady material' – although strictly speaking, there is never a real 'Brady violation' unless the nondisclosure was so serious that there is a reasonable probability that the suppressed evidence would have produced a different verdict."
- The prosecutor must disclose arrest photographs of the defendant when those photos do not match the victim's description.
- Some state systems have expansively defined Brady material to include many other items, including for example any documents which might reflect negatively on a witness's credibility.
- Police officers who have been dishonest are sometimes referred to as "Brady cops." Because of the Brady ruling, prosecutors are required to notify defendants and their attorneys whenever a law enforcement official involved in their case has a sustained record for knowingly lying in an official capacity. Lists of such officers are known as "Brady lists". The growing use of Brady, both in the federal and state sectors, is one of the most important changes affecting police officers' employment.

== Procedures for compliance ==
- In order to ensure compliance with Brady, the United States Supreme Court repeatedly urged the "careful prosecutor" to favor disclosure over concealment. Conformity with Brady is a continuing obligation of prosecutors. Some prosecuting attorney offices have adopted and created specialized procedure and bureaus to meet their burden.
- Pitchess v. Superior Court is the source for a "Pitchess motion" in California. Such a motion can be made by a criminal defendant to discover complaints made against a police officer, and the investigation of those complaints, such that they are contained in the officer's personnel records. The motions can be made in a California Superior Court under California Evidence Code 1043–1046. Notwithstanding, because of the broad nature of the discovery that the associated court rule and statute provide, getting actual records can be complicated. In California, there is a carefully prescribed procedure governing such request, and making disclosure without an order is a crime. The statutory scheme was developed, in part, because law enforcement departments had developed a practice of purging their files concerning misconduct claims made against their officers.

== Applicability to plea bargains ==
As of 2018, federal appeals courts are split as to whether defendants have the right to receive materially exculpatory evidence before making a plea bargain, which is how the vast majority of convictions are now obtained. The Seventh, Ninth, and Tenth Circuits assert that they do; the First, Second, Fourth, and Fifth Circuits assert that they do not.

State "open file" laws like the Michael Morton Act in Texas allow defendants to see all prosecution evidence at every stage of prosecution, including the plea bargain stage.

== See also ==
- Giglio v. United States
- Jencks Act
- Jencks v. United States
- Police perjury
