= Giglio v. United States =

- Supreme Court of the United States

Argued October 12, 1971 Decided February 24, 1972
- Full case name: John Giglio v. United States
- Citations: 405 U.S. 150 (more) 92 S. Ct. 763; 31 L. Ed. 2d 104; 1972 U.S. LEXIS 83

Case history
- Prior: Certiorari to the United States Court of Appeals for the Second Circuit

Holding
- Prosecution's failure to inform the jury that a witness had been promised not to be prosecuted in exchange for his testimony was a failure to fulfill the duty to present all material evidence to the jury, and constituted a violation of due process, requiring a new trial.

Court membership
- Chief Justice Warren E. Burger Associate Justices William O. Douglas · William J. Brennan Jr. Potter Stewart · Byron White; Thurgood Marshall · Harry Blackmun; Lewis F. Powell Jr. · William Rehnquist

Case opinion
- Majority: Burger, joined by unanimous
- Justices Powell and Rehnquist took no part in the consideration or decision of the case.

Laws applied
- U.S. Const. amend. V

Giglio v. United States, 405 U.S. 150 (1972), is a United States Supreme Court case in which the court held that the prosecution's failure to inform the jury that a witness had been promised not to be prosecuted in exchange for his testimony was a failure to fulfill the duty to present all material evidence to the jury, and constituted a violation of due process, requiring a new trial. This is the case even if the failure to disclose was a matter of negligence and not intent. The case extended the court's holding in Brady v. Maryland, requiring such agreements to be disclosed to defense counsel. As a result of this case, the term Giglio material is sometimes used to refer to any information pertaining to deals that witnesses in a criminal case may have entered into with the government.

== Background ==
In June 1966, bank officials at Manufacturers Hanover Trust Co. discovered that Robert Taliento, a teller at the bank, had cashed several forged money orders. When he was questioned by the FBI, Taliento confessed that he had supplied John Giglio, the petitioner, with signature cards from one of the bank's customers, which Giglio used to forge $2,300 in money orders. Taliento then processed the forged money orders through the bank.

An affidavit indicated that Assistant U.S. Attorney DiPaola struck a deal with Taliento, promising that he would not be prosecuted for the crime if he testified against Giglio. Taliento testified before a grand jury, resulting in Giglio's indictment.

Giglio's trial, two years after the indictment, was prosecuted by a different prosecutor, Assistant U.S. Attorney Golden. DiPaola did not inform Golden of the deal struck with Taliento, and Taliento assured Golden prior to the commencement of the trial that no such deal had been made. In addition, U.S. Attorney Hoey personally consulted with both Taliento and Taliento's attorney prior to trial, emphasizing that Taliento would definitely be prosecuted if he did not testify, but that if he did testify, whether he was prosecuted would depend on the "good judgment and conscience of the Government."

At trial, Taliento testified "Nobody told me I wouldn't be prosecuted" and "I believe I still could be prosecuted." The trial court did not attempt to reconcile the apparent conflict between DiPaola and Golden. It proceeded on the premise that even if DiPaola had made such a promise it was not authorized, and its disclosure to the jury would not have affected the verdict.

Giglio was found guilty and sentenced to five years in prison. While his appeal was pending, his counsel discovered evidence of the government's discussions with Taliento. The Supreme Court granted certiorari to determine whether the evidence that was not disclosed required a new trial under the due process criteria that had been enunciated in Napue v. Illinois and Brady v. Maryland.

== Opinion of the court ==
The Supreme Court began its analysis by noting that deliberately deceiving the trial court and jury by presenting evidence known to be false had been held to be incompatible with the "rudimentary demands of justice" as early as Mooney v. Holohan. In Napue, the court had held that the same result occurs "when the State, although not soliciting false evidence, allows it to go uncorrected when it appears." In Brady, the Supreme Court had held that, irrespective of the good faith or bad faith of the prosecution, suppression of material, exculpatory evidence required a new trial.

In Giglio's case, the court found that neither DiPaola's authority nor his failure to inform his superior Hoey or his associate Golden was controlling. The Court held that, regardless of whether the failure to disclose was intentional or negligent, disclosing the information remained the responsibility of the prosecutor in its position as spokesman for the government; and that a promise made by one attorney on the case must be attributed to the government.

The Court noted that the government's case relied almost entirely on Taliento's testimony, and without it, there could have been no indictment, and no evidence to take to a jury. The Court found that this made Taliento's credibility an important issue; any evidence of an agreement or understanding with respect to Taliento's future prosecution was relevant to his credibility, and the jury was entitled to know about it. The Court held that due process required that Giglio be granted a new trial, and reversed and remanded.

== See also ==
- Brady disclosure
