= Pitchess motion =

Legal motion in California criminal cases

A Pitchess motion is a request made by the defense in a California criminal case, such as a DUI case or a resisting arrest case, to access a law enforcement officer's personnel information when the defendant alleges in an affidavit that the officer used excessive force or lied about the events surrounding the defendant's arrest. The information provided will include prior incidents of use of force, allegations of excessive force, citizen complaints, and information gathered during the officer's pre-employment background investigation. The motion's name comes from the case Pitchess v. Superior Court.

== Pitchess v. Superior Court ==
In March 1972 César Echeverría and others were charged with felony battery against four deputies of the Los Angeles County Sheriff, Peter J. Pitchess. Echeverria asserted that he acted in self-defense in response to excessive force; immediately following the incident, he was in an intensive care unit, and the officers themselves had sustained no serious injuries. Echeverria requested records of internal investigations into police misconduct, which the trial court granted, but the administrative services bureau refused to cooperate, so a subpoena duces tecum directed the sheriff to produce the information.

Sheriff Pitchess sought a writ of mandate to compel the Los Angeles County Superior Court to quash its subpoena. Thus in Pitchess v. Superior Court, Sheriff Pitchess and his administrative staff are the case's petitioners, and the Superior Court is the respondent, with César Echeverría as the real party in interest.

The petition was unusual, as it came directly from the county sheriff and so the Court of Appeals readily agreed to hear the petition.

The Court found, however, that although such records could be classified as discoverable by García, they had to contain complaints that were sustained by the police department itself before they could be provided. In other words, the police department must have a record of a deputy's propensity for or acts of abuse that were substantiated by the department itself.

García then petitioned the State Supreme Court to uphold the subpoena, which it did in a 7-0 ruling.

The Pitchess motion is now one of the 15 or 20 most common motions filed in criminal court in California.

A defendant's right to information about alleged officer misconduct or dishonesty thus providing information for witness impeachment has since been established by statute in California in sections 1043 to 1047 of the California Evidence Code.

== Procedure ==
The motion can be made by a criminal defendant to discover complaints made against a police officer, and the investigation of those complaints, such that they are contained in the officer's personnel records. The motions can be made in a California Superior Court under California Evidence Code 1043-1046. Notwithstanding the broad nature of the discovery that the associated court rule and statute provide, getting records can be problematic.

A Pitchess motion contains numerous parts. A defendant must identify the case in which the records are being sought, which is easily satisfied by simply referencing the case number. A defendant must attach a full set of the police reports or at least those portions of the police report that relate to the Pitchess motion. The defendant must identify which officer or officers whose records are sought and which government agency has custody of the records. The defendant must also describe, via affidavit or declaration, the records and explain why the records are relevant. The defense must prove there is "good cause" to release the records. Explaining why good cause exists, and why the records are relevant often discloses a defense lawyer's strategy in a criminal case. Thus, courts will allow a defense attorney to file this portion of the motion under seal so that only the judge can review it. The defendant must also prove that the agency that has custody of the records has received notice of the motion.

In California, there is a carefully prescribed procedure governing Pitchess motions. Evidence obtained from one Pitchess motion cannot be used in a different case, absent a court order. When a court grants a defendant's Pitchess motion, the court is required to order that the records may not be used for any other proceeding. The statutory scheme was developed, in part, because law enforcement departments had developed a practice of purging their files concerning misconduct claims made against their officers.

== Disclosure ==
When courts grant Pitchess motions, courts generally refuse to disclose verbatim reports or records from peace officer personnel files. Instead, courts typically order the law enforcement agency to reveal the name, address, and telephone number of any prior complainants and/or witnesses as well as the dates of the incidents in question. The defense can obtain copies of the verbatim reports under certain circumstances. If the defense can show that the witnesses cannot be found, the witnesses cannot recall what they said, or the witnesses refuse to talk with the defense, the defense can obtain copies of the full reports.

== See also ==
- Brady disclosure
- Brady v. Maryland
- Police perjury

== General and cited sources ==
- Pitchess Privileges and the CPRA: Police Officer Personnel and Investigative Records Privileges and their Intersection with the California Public Records Act (2025). https://www.amazon.com/dp/0578338645
- Special Litigation Division (January 2012). "Brady v. Maryland Outline" (PDF). The Public Defender Service for the District of Columbia. Archived from the original (PDF) on December 22, 2014.
