= Jenny Vincent =

American singer-songwriter

- Born: April 22, 1913; Minnesota
- Died: May 8, 2016 (aged 103)
- Genres: Folk; Hispanic folk
- Occupations: Singer; Songwriter; Activist
- Instruments: Piano; Accordion
- Years active: 1930–2015

Jenny Wells Vincent (April 22, 1913 – May 8, 2016) was an American singer, songwriter, and activist. A scholar of Hispano music, she is credited with helping to preserve New Mexican folk music.

== Biography ==
Vincent was born in Minnesota and raised in Chicago. In 1936, following her graduation from Vassar College, she and her husband, Dan Wells, visited the San Cristóbal, New Mexico, ranch of Freida Lawrence, the widow of D. H. Lawrence. In 1937, they bought a ranch in San Cristóbal and moved to New Mexico. Soon after, they founded a school on the property for grades 5–12 for boarders and daytime students. A classically trained musician, Vincent visited Taos-area schools where she played Mexican folk songs, although school administrators, pushing for assimilation, forbade speaking Spanish in classrooms. She also traveled from town to town, recording local musicians singing and playing old folk songs, frequently in Spanish. In 1943, Vincent became the Taos County representative for the Rocky Mountain Farmers Union, which, according to a biography, was "a milestone for her personal and political maturation. In this work she found meaningful expression and practical application for her growing political convictions.” That same year, Vincent joined the Communist Party.

Vincent and Wells were divorced in the early 1940s. In 1949, she married Craig Vincent. They remained at the San Cristóbal property, converting the school to a guest ranch. Its mission was "not to raise livestock" but to "foster a community among progressives looking for a refuge from the battles of the Cold War". Among other political and social causes, the Vincents supported the Chicano Movement and the 1951 Salt of the Earth Strike. Believing that music was a vehicle for social advocacy, Vincent played with like-minded musicians including Pete Seeger, Paul Robeson, Woody Guthrie, Malvina Reynolds and Earl Robinson.

She died in 2016 at the age of 103. Her archives of original recordings were donated to the University of New Mexico's Zimmerman Library.

== Awards and honors ==
Vincent was one of six New Mexicans to receive the 2013 Governor's Arts Award. Recognized as "one of the finest folk musicians in the state", she was nominated by three past award recipients. In 2006, she was honored by The University of New Mexico and the New Mexico State Historic Preservation Division for a lifetime of activism through popular culture.
