= Jencks v. United States =

- Supreme Court of the United States

Argued October 17, 1956 Decided June 3, 1957
- Full case name: Jencks v. United States, Certiorari to the United States Court of Appeals for the Fifth Circuit, No. 23
- Citations: 353 U.S. 657 (more) 77 S. Ct. 1007; 1 L. Ed. 2d 1103; 1957 U.S. LEXIS 1623

Case history
- Prior: Motion for Certiorari from the Fifth Circuit

Holding
- The government must produce documents relied upon by government witnesses in federal criminal procedures. Jencks' conviction was overturned.

Court membership
- Chief Justice Earl Warren Associate Justices Hugo Black · Felix Frankfurter; William O. Douglas · Harold H. Burton; Tom C. Clark · John M. Harlan II; William J. Brennan Jr. · Charles E. Whittaker

Case opinions
- Majority: Brennan, joined by Warren, Black, Frankfurter, Douglas, Burton, Harlan
- Dissent: Clark
- Whittaker took no part in the consideration or decision of the case.
- Superseded by
- Jencks Act

Jencks v. United States, 353 U.S. 657 (1957), is a decision of the U.S. Supreme Court in which the court held that the federal government must produce documents relied upon by government witnesses in federal criminal proceedings.

The petitioner, Clinton Jencks appealed, by certiorari, his conviction in a federal district court of violating 18 U.S.C. 1001 by filing, under 9 (h) of the National Labor Relations Act, as president of a labor union, an affidavit stating falsely that he was not a member of the Communist Party or affiliated with such Party. Crucial testimony against him was given by two paid undercover agents of the Federal Bureau of Investigation, who stated on cross-examination that they made regular oral or written reports to the FBI on the matters about which they had testified.

Jencks moved for production of these reports in court for inspection by the judge with a view to their possible use by the petitioner in impeaching such testimony. His motions were denied. Jencks appealed this issue by petitioning the U.S. Supreme Court for a writ of certiorari. The Court held that the denial of the motions for production of the documents was erroneous, and the conviction was reversed.

== Issues ==
1.) The Court was asked to rule on the appropriateness of the Government withholding documents or statements made by, or relied upon, by government witnesses in federal criminal prosecutions.

2.) Further error was alleged because the jury had not been instructed on the affiliation, membership, and the credibility of the government informants who testified at trial against Jencks.

== Holdings ==
(a.) The Petitioner was not required to lay a preliminary foundation for his motion, showing inconsistency between the contents of the reports and the testimony of the government agents, because a sufficient foundation was established by their testimony that their reports were of the events and activities related in their testimony.

(b.) Petitioner was entitled to an order directing the Government to produce for inspection all written reports of FBI agents in its possession, and, when orally made and recorded by the FBI, statements bearing upon events and activities as to which they testified at trial.

(c.) Petitioner is entitled to inspect the reports to decide whether to use them in his defense.

(d.) The practice of producing government documents to the trial judge for his determination of relevancy and materiality, without a hearing involving the accused, is disapproved.

(e.) Only after inspection of the reports by the accused, must the trial judge determine admissibility of the contents and the method to be employed for the elimination of parts immaterial or irrelevant.

(f.) Criminal action must be dismissed when the Government, on the ground of privilege, elects not to comply with an order to produce, for the accused's inspection and for admission in evidence, relevant statements or reports in its possession of government witnesses touching the subject matter of their testimony at trial.

(g.) The burden is the Government's, not to be shifted to the trial judge, to decide whether the public prejudice of allowing the crime to go unpunished is greater than that attendant upon the possible disclosure of state secrets and other confidential information in the Government's possession.

(h.) The proper remedy in cases which the Government chooses not to disclose or produce documents it deems sensitive, or wants to keep private for security reasons is dismissal of the criminal charges.

== Facts and background ==
On April 28, 1950, the petitioner Jencks, who was president of the Amalgamated Bayard District Union, Local 890, International Union of Mine, Mill & Smelter Workers, filed an "Affidavit of Non-Communist Union Officer" with the National Labor Relations Board, pursuant to 9 (h) of the National Labor Relations Act. He was convicted under a two-count indictment charging that he violated 18 U. S. C. 1001 by falsely swearing in that affidavit that he was not on April 28, 1950, a member of the Communist Party or affiliated with such Party. The Court of Appeals of the Fifth Circuit affirmed the conviction and also an order of the District Court denying the petitioner's motion for a new trial. The United States Supreme Court granted certiorari.

Two errors in the trial were alleged. Harvey Matusow and J. W. Ford, the Government's principal witnesses, were Communist Party members paid by the FBI contemporaneously to make oral or written reports of the Communist Party activities in which they participated. They made such reports to the FBI of activities allegedly participated in by the petitioner, Jencks, about which they testified at the trial. Error is asserted by the trial judge of the petitioner's motions to direct the Government to produce these reports for inspection and use in cross-examining Matusow and Ford. Error is also alleged in the instructions given to the jury on membership, affiliation and the credibility of the informers.

Former Party members testified they and the petitioner, as members of the Communist Party of New Mexico, had been expressly instructed to conceal their membership and not to carry membership cards. They also testified the Party kept no membership records or minutes of membership meetings, and such meetings were secretly arranged and clandestinely held. One of the witnesses said that special care was taken to conceal the Party membership of members like the petitioner. It was stated at trial, "occupying strategic and important positions in labor unions and other organizations where public knowledge of their membership to non-Communists would jeopardize their position in the organization", had been a goal of the Communist Party of the United States.

Because of this, the Government did not attempt to prove Jencks was an actual member of the Communist Party. Instead, the prosecution relied on entirely circumstantial evidence. Matusow testified he had conversations with the petitioner, concerning his activities in the Communist Party. The Government also attached an Affidavit of Non-Communist Union Officer in which the petitioner had affirmed that he was not a member of the Communist Party.

Further testimony indicated the petitioner, who was a World War II veteran had encouraged Communist Party members to join various veteran groups in the United States with the intent of converting them to the Communist cause. This was alleged to have occurred in 1946.

Later in 1946, Jencks was employed in the International Union of Mine, Mill & Smelter Workers as business agent for several local unions in the Silver City-Bayard, New Mexico area. It was testified one of the first acts Jencks performed as a union official was to meet with the Communist Party organizer for the area. The plan was to move the Amalgamated Union Local 890 into the Communist Party.

J. W. Ford was a member of the Communist Party of New Mexico from 1946 to September 1950, holding important positions within the Party. In 1948, he testified he became a paid informant for the FBI. He was paid approximately $3,325 for his services during the time covered in the Jencks trial.

It was planned that Jencks would run for Congress on the Progressive Party ticket in 1948. It was also anticipated that the Mexican-American Association of Phoenix would be infiltrated and converted to the Communist cause. Attempts would be made of a similar nature in the Mexican-American Association of Albuquerque.

Ford's duties in the Party were to report "any particular defections from the Communist philosophy or any peculiar actions, statements or associations which would endanger the Communist Party of the state." If a defection reported was considered important, the member "would be called in and would be either severely reprimanded or expelled." Ford later quit the Party without apparent reprisal.

The testimony indicated there had been competing interests in the labor union, in which certain members had wanted to end all affiliation with any Communist organization. Party members were instructed to not carry membership cards and deny any association with the Communist Party. It was in this context that Jencks filled out the affidavit required by the Taft-Hartley Act testifying that he was not a member of the Communist Party. General instructions from the Party were to not sign the affidavit, at all.

Harvey Matusow was a member of the Communist Party of New York and was a paid undercover agent of the FBI. In July or August 1950, he traveled to New Mexico where he met with Jencks. He testified that Jencks was excited that Matusow might relocate to New Mexico. At trial, he testified Jencks said, "we can use you out here, we need more active Party members." Subsequently, Matusow began programs in New Mexico to applaud the Soviet Union for disarming, denouncing the United States as the aggressor in Korea, and calling for world peace. He and Jencks discussed ways to slow down the war effort in Korea by strikes at New Mexico mines.

At trial, Ford and Matusow were subjected to vigorous cross-examination. A request for documents they had relied upon for testimony was denied without explanation by the trial judge.

== Majority opinion by Brennan ==
Mr. Justice William J. Brennan delivered the decision of the Court.

Both the trial court and the Court of Appeals erred. We hold that the petitioner was not required to lay a preliminary foundation of inconsistency, because a sufficient foundation was established by the testimony of Matusow and Ford that their reports were of the events and activities related to their testimony. The crucial nature of the testimony of Ford and Matusow to the Government's case is apparent. The impeachment of that testimony was singularly important to Jencks. The value of the reports for impeachment purposes was highlighted by the admissions of both witnesses that they could not remember what reports were oral and what were written. Matusow testified, "I don't recall what I put in my reports two or three years ago, written or oral, I don't know what they were."

Every experienced trial judge and trial lawyer knows the value for impeaching purposes of statements the witness recording the events before time dulls treacherous memory. The denial of access to the written records in this case is reversible error.

It is unquestionably true that the protection of vital national interests may militate against public disclosure of documents in the Government's possession. This court noted in United States v. Reynolds that in criminal cases, "...the Government can invoke its evidentiary privileges only at the price of letting the defendant go free."

We hold that the criminal action must be dismissed when the Government, on the ground of privilege elects not to comply with an order to produce, for the accused's inspection and for admission into evidence, relevant statements or reports in its possession of government witnesses touching the subject matter of their testimony at trial. In accord with Roviaro v. United States the burden shall not be shifted to the trial judge, to decide whether the public prejudice of allowing crime to go unpunished is greater than that attendant upon the possible disclosure of state secrets and other confidential information in the Government's possession.

The judgment is reversed.

== Aftermath of the decision ==
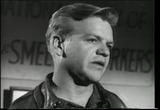
Clinton Jencks starring in Salt of the Earth, a movie based on his story, made in 1954

In the wake of the decision, the United States Congress enacted legislation that came to be known as the Jencks Act. It instructs the federal courts, in criminal matters to require production of verbatim transcripts and other notes or documents related to testimony by government agents, employees or witnesses. The request for the production of such documents must be made by the defendant. Production is required only after the witnesses have testified and are not generally available in pre-trial hearings. The Jencks Act sometimes corresponds with the requirement in Brady v. Maryland that exculpatory evidence be provided to the defense. Many federal administrative agencies have incorporated Jencks standards into their procedures. Most state courts have not.
