= United States v. Bagley =

- Supreme Court of the United States

Argued March 20, 1985 Decided July 2, 1985
- Full case name: United States v. Bagley
- Citations: 473 U.S. 667 (more)
- Argument: Oral argument

Case history
- Prior: Bagley v. Lumpkin, 719 F.2d 1462 (CA9 1983)

Holding
- The Court of Appeals erred in holding that the prosecutor's failure to disclose evidence that could have been used effectively to impeach important Government witnesses requires automatic reversal. Such nondisclosure constitutes constitutional error and requires reversal of the conviction only if the evidence is material in the sense that its suppression might have affected the outcome of the trial.

Court membership
- Chief Justice Warren E. Burger Associate Justices William J. Brennan Jr. · Byron White; Thurgood Marshall · Harry Blackmun; Lewis F. Powell Jr. · William Rehnquist; John P. Stevens · Sandra Day O'Connor

Case opinions
- Majority: Blackmun (Parts I and II), joined by Burger, White, Rehnquist, O'Connor
- Plurality: Blackmun (Part III), joined by O'Connor
- Concurrence: White (in part and in judgment), joined by Burger, Rehnquist
- Dissent: Marshall, joined by Brennan
- Dissent: Stevens
- Powell took no part in the consideration or decision of the case.

Laws applied
- U.S. Const. amend. XIV

United States v. Bagley, 473 U.S. 667 (1985), was a Supreme Court of the United States case that established the standard for materiality under Brady v. Maryland.

== Background ==
=== Brady and its progeny ===
In Brady v. Maryland (1963), the Supreme Court held that the prosecution must disclose all exculpatory evidence to the defense, the only requirements being that the evidence is favorable to the defendant and material. Thirteen years later, the Supreme Court defined what it meant for evidence to be material in a case called United States v. Agurs (1976). In Agurs, the Court set two different standards of materiality based on whether or not the defendant requested the nondisclosed evidence.

=== Facts of the case ===
Hughes Anderson Bagley was indicted on 15 counts of violating federal narcotic and firearm statutes in the Western District of Washington in October 1977. In preparation for trial, to be held in December, Bagley's counsel filed a discovery motion that requested information on the witnesses the prosecution intended to call, their criminal records, and any promises made to them in exchange for testimony. At Bagley's bench trial, two state law-enforcement officers (James F. O'Connor and Donald E. Mitchell) testified as the prosecution's principal witnesses. The officers had assisted the ATF in their investigation of Bagley with undercover work. The prosecution did not notify the defendant of any promises made to the officers in exchange for testimony, as required. Mr. Bagley was subsequently found guilty of all the narcotics charges but not guilty for all of the firearms charges.

In 1980, while incarcerated for the narcotic charges, Bagley filed a Freedom of Information Act request and received response copies of ATF contracts that the principal witnesses had signed three years prior. These forms were entitled "Contract for Purchase of Information and Payment of Lump Sum Therefor" and indicated $300 was to be paid to the witnesses. Each form stated that the principal witnesses would:

[P]rovide information regarding T–I and other violations committed by Hughes A. Bagley, Jr.; that he will purchase evidence for ATF; that he will cut [sic ] in an undercover capacity for ATF; that he will assist ATF in gathering of evidence and testify against the violator in federal court.

Bagley moved to vacate his sentence under Brady v. Maryland, arguing that his right to due process had been violated by the prosecution's failure to disclose these forms. The district court ruled against Bagley but was reversed by the Ninth Circuit.

== Opinion of the court ==
=== Part I ===
In the first part of Justice Harry Blackmun's opinion for the court, the factual and procedural history was laid out; Part I ended with the Court's ruling to reverse the judgment of the Ninth Circuit.

The District Court, in denying to vacate Bagley's sentence, had found that had the existence of the agreements been disclosed during trial, the disclosure would have had no effect upon its finding that the Government had proved beyond a reasonable doubt that respondent was guilty of the offenses for which he had been convicted. The District Court had reasoned that the witness testimony largely focused to the firearms charges, which Bagley had been acquitted on, and only briefly concerned the narcotics charge. The District Court had also said that on cross-examination, Bagley's attorney had not sought to discredit their testimony as to the facts of distribution but rather sought to show that the controlled substances in question came from supplies that had been prescribed for Bagley's personal use and that the witnesses' answers there tended to be favorable. Thus, the claimed impeachment evidence would not have been helpful and would not have affected the outcome of the trial.

The United States Court of Appeals for the Ninth Circuit reversed the District Court's decision in Bagley v. Lumpkin, 719 F.2d 1462 (1983). The Court of Appeals began by noting that, according to precedent, prosecutorial failure to respond to a specific Brady request is properly analyzed as error, and a resulting conviction must be reversed unless the error is harmless beyond a reasonable doubt. The court then noted that the District Judge who had presided over the bench trial concluded beyond a reasonable doubt that disclosure of the ATF agreement would not have affected the outcome. The Court of Appeals, however, stated that it disagreed with this conclusion, in particular, with the Government's premise that the testimony was exculpatory on the narcotics charges, and that Bagley therefore would not have sought to impeach "his own witness."

The Blackmun opinion characterized the Court of Appeals reversal as having been based on the theory that the Government's failure to disclose the requested Brady information that respondent could have used to conduct an effective cross-examination impaired respondent's right to confront adverse witnesses, as the Court of Appeals opinion had concluded by saying:

"[W]e hold that the government's failure to provide requested Brady information to Bagley so that he could effectively cross-examine two important government witnesses requires an automatic reversal."

=== Part II ===
The majority opinion continued by discussing that the basis for Brady was the requirement of due process. The Court reiterated that the due process requirement was not to displace the adversarial system, but to ensure that there was no miscarriage of justice. Prosecutors only had to disclose evidence favorable to the accused that, if suppressed, would deprive the defendant of a fair trial. This information under Brady and its progeny had to be material and exculpatory, which would include impeachment evidence.

The Court held that the constitutional error, if any, was in the Government's failure to assist the defense by disclosing information that might have been helpful in conducting the cross-examination, and that suppression of evidence amounts to a constitutional violation only if it deprives the defendant of a fair trial. It held that this only occurs if the evidence is material in the sense that its suppression undermines confidence in the outcome of the trial.

=== Part III ===
Only Justices Harry Blackmun and Sandra Day O'Connor signed onto Part III of the majority opinion where they adopted the Strickland v. Washington standard for prejudicial deficient performance by counsel as the new standard for materiality under Brady. Under that standard, nondisclosed evidence is material if it has a "reasonable probability" to alter the trial result. By doing so, the opinion framed the standard as flexible enough to cover previous scenarios where the defendant requested or did not request the evidence in question. The opinion further defined "reasonable probability" as "a probability sufficient to undermine confidence in the outcome."

The Blackmun opinion permitted trial courts to make an additional inquiry in specific request cases (i.e., when the defendant asked for the nondisclosed evidence specifically), to determine whether the defendant's case was adversely affected by the withholding.

Justice Blackmun finished the opinion by reversing the judgment of the Court of Appeals and remanding the case to that court for a determination whether there is a reasonable probability the trial's result would have been different, had the inducement offered by the Government been disclosed.

=== White concurrence ===
Justice Byron White wrote a concurrence that was joined by Chief Justice Warren E. Burger and Justice William Rehnquist. The three signed onto the new "reasonable probability" standard discussed in Part III but did not join the Blackmun opinion's statements regarding specific requests.

=== Marshall dissent ===
Justice Thurgood Marshall's dissent, joined by Justice William J. Brennan Jr., stated

"When the Government withholds from a defendant evidence that might impeach the prosecution's only witnesses, that failure to disclose cannot be deemed harmless error. Because that is precisely the nature of the undisclosed evidence in this case, I would affirm the judgment of the Court of Appeals and would not remand for further proceedings.

Marshall further wrote that the majority opinion's characterization of the witness testimony was inaccurate; that Bagley's attorney had tried to impeach O'Connor, by asking him whether two ATF agents had pressured him or had threatened that his job might be in jeopardy, in order to get him to cooperate, but that O'Connor had answered in the negative, so he stopped this line of questioning. Bagley's attorney even had attempted to argue to the District Court, in his closing argument, that the witnesses, O'Connor and Mitchell, had "fabricated" their accounts, but the court rejected the proposition.

Marshall's dissent stated "Whatever the applicable standard of materiality . . . in this instance it undoubtedly is well met." The dissent continued to say that the prosecutor's duty is straightforward, that they must divulge all evidence that reasonably appears favorable to the defendant, erring on the side of disclosure, but that the Court offered a complex alternative, defining the right not by reference to the possible usefulness of the particular evidence in preparing and presenting the case, but retrospectively, by reference to the likely effect the evidence will have on the outcome of the trial. Marshall believed the standard would allow prosecutors to avoid disclosing obviously exculpatory evidence.

=== Stevens dissent ===
Justice Stevens wrote a dissent to say that he agreed the Court of Appeals misdescribed the rule stated in Brady, but disagreed with the Court's unwarranted decision to rewrite the rule itself.

== Scholarly criticisms ==
Bagley has been criticized by scholars for requiring prosecutors to make disclosure decisions based upon their post-hoc view of how the trial will go. Gerald Fowke stated that "[t]he chasm between 'a reasonable probability' and 'sufficien[cy] to undermine confidence in the outcome' cannot be bridged by defining the former with the latter" because probabilities are objective, and confidence is subjective.
