= Brady v. Maryland =

- Supreme Court of the United States

Argued March 18–19, 1963 Decided May 13, 1963
- Full case name: John L. Brady v. State of Maryland
- Citations: 373 U.S. 83 (more) 83 S. Ct. 1194; 10 L. Ed. 2d 215; 1963 U.S. LEXIS 1615

Case history
- Prior: Brady v. State, 226 Md. 422, 174 A.2d 167 (1961); cert. granted, 371 U.S. 812 (1962).

Holding
- Withholding of evidence violates due process "where the evidence is material either to guilt or to punishment."

Court membership
- Chief Justice Earl Warren Associate Justices Hugo Black · William O. Douglas; Tom C. Clark · John M. Harlan II; William J. Brennan Jr. · Potter Stewart; Byron White · Arthur Goldberg

Case opinions
- Majority: Douglas, joined by Warren, Clark, Brennan, Stewart, Goldberg
- Concurrence: White
- Dissent: Harlan, joined by Black

Laws applied
- U.S. Const. amend. XIV

Brady v. Maryland, 373 U.S. 83 (1963), is a landmark U.S. Supreme Court decision holding that under the Due Process Clause of the Constitution of the United States, the prosecution must turn over to a criminal defendant any significant evidence in its possession that suggests the defendant is not guilty (exculpatory evidence).

== Background ==
On June 27, 1958, a 25-year-old Maryland man named John Leo Brady and his 24-year-old companion Charles Donald Boblit murdered 53-year-old acquaintance William Brooks. Both men were convicted and sentenced to death. Brady admitted to being involved in the murder, but he claimed that Boblit had done the actual killing and that they had stolen Brooks' car ahead of a planned bank robbery but had not planned to kill him. The prosecution had withheld a written statement by Boblit (the men were tried separately), confessing that he had committed the act of killing by himself. The Maryland Court of Appeals had affirmed the conviction and remanded the case for a retrial only on the question of punishment. Brady's lawyer, E. Clinton Bamberger Jr., appealed the case to the Supreme Court, hoping for a new trial.

== Decision ==
The Supreme Court held that withholding exculpatory evidence violates due process "where the evidence is material either to guilt or to punishment". The Court determined that under Maryland law, the withheld evidence could not have exculpated the defendant but was material to his level of punishment. Thus, the Maryland Court of Appeals' ruling was affirmed – Brady would receive a new sentencing hearing but not a new trial.

William O. Douglas wrote: "We now hold that the suppression by the prosecution of evidence favorable to an accused upon request violates due process where the evidence is material either to guilt or to punishment... Society wins not only when the guilty are convicted, but when criminal trials are fair".

A defendant's request for "Brady disclosure" refers to the holding of the Brady case, and the numerous state and federal cases that interpret its requirement that the prosecution disclose material exculpatory evidence to the defense. Exculpatory evidence is "material" if "there is a reasonable probability that his conviction or sentence would have been different had these materials been disclosed". Brady evidence includes statements of witnesses or physical evidence that conflicts with the prosecution's witnesses and evidence that could allow the defense to impeach the credibility of a prosecution witness.

== Aftermath ==
Brady was given a new hearing, where his sentence was commuted to life imprisonment. Brady was ultimately paroled. He moved to Florida, where he worked as a truck driver, started a family, and did not re-offend. Brady died of natural causes on October 22, 2009, at 77.

Police officers who have been dishonest are sometimes referred to as "Brady cops". Because of the Brady ruling, prosecutors are required to notify defendants and their attorneys whenever a law enforcement official involved in their case has a confirmed record of knowingly lying in an official capacity. This requirement has been understood by lawyers and jurists as requiring prosecutors to maintain lists, known as Brady lists, of police officers who are not credible witnesses and whose involvement in a case undermines a prosecution's integrity.

Brady has become not only a matter of defendants' due process trial rights, but also of police officers' due process employment rights. Officers and their unions have used litigation, legislation, and informal political pressure to push back on Brady's application to their personnel files. This conflict over Brady's application creates a divide between prosecutors and police officers, and between police management and police labor. Brady evidence also includes evidence material to credibility of a non-police witness, such as evidence of false statements by the witness or evidence that a witness was paid to act as an informant.

In United States v. Bagley (1985), the Court narrowed the reach of Brady by stating the suppressed evidence had to be "exculpatory" and "material" for a violation to result in the reversal of a conviction. Harry Blackmun wrote in Bagley that "only if there is a reasonable probability that, had the evidence been disclosed to the defense, the result of the proceeding would have been different. A 'reasonable probability' is a probability sufficient to undermine confidence in the outcome."

== Subsequent cases ==
- Pitchess v. Davis, 421 U.S. 482 (1975)
- Cone v. Bell, 556 U.S. 449 (2009)
- District Attorney's Office for the Third Judicial District v. Osborne, 557 U.S. 52 (2009)
- Connick v. Thompson (2011)
- Smith v. Cain, 565 U.S. 73
- Wetzel v. Lambert, 565 U.S. 520 (2012)
- Wearry v. Cain (2016)
- Turner v. United States (2017)

== See also ==
- List of United States Supreme Court cases, volume 373
- Brady material
- Giglio v. United States
- Jencks Act
- Jencks v. United States
- Pitchess motion
- Testilying
- R v Stinchcombe, Canadian Supreme Court judgment on a similar subject

== Sources ==
- Clark, Garry (September 2005). "The Grand Jury: Phase: I — The Murder of Marsa Gipson". Archived from the original on February 2, 2011.
- Gershman, Bennett L. (January 1, 2006). "Reflections on Brady v. Maryland". South Texas Law Review. 47. Pace University School of Law: 685.
- Hochman, Robert (1996). "Brady v Maryland and the Search for Truth in Criminal Trials". The University of Chicago Law Review. 63 (4). The University of Chicago Law Review, Vol. 63, No. 4: 1673–1705. doi:10.2307/1600284. JSTOR 1600284.
- Hooper, Laural L.; Marsh, Jennifer E.; and Yeh, Brian. Treatment of Brady v. Maryland Material in United States District and State Courts’ Rules, Orders, and Policies: Report to the Advisory Committee on Criminal Rules of the Judicial Conference of the United States, Federal Judicial Center, October 2004.
- Levenson, Laurie L. (February 10, 2013). "Discovery From the Trenches: The Future of Brady". UCLA Law Review Discovery. 60: 74.
- Sundby, Scott E. (2002). "Fallen Superheroes and Constitutional Mirages: The Tale of Brady v. Maryland". McGeorge Law Review. 33. doi:10.2139/ssrn.361040.
- "Successful Brady/Napue Cases" (PDF). Habeas Assistance and Training 09/09. Capital Defense Network. September 27, 2009. Archived from the original (PDF) on April 13, 2014.
