= Jencks Act =

United States federal law on inculpatory evidence

In the United States, the Jencks Act (18 U.S.C. § 3500) requires the prosecutor to produce a verbatim statement or report made by a government witness or prospective government witness (other than the defendant), but only before cross or adverse examination.

Jencks material is evidence that is used in the course of a federal criminal prosecution in the United States. It usually consists of documents relied upon by government witnesses who testify at trial. The material is described as inculpatory, favoring the United States government's prosecution of a criminal defendant.

The Jencks Act also covers other documents related to the testimony, or relied upon by government witnesses at trial. Typically, the material may consist of police notes, memoranda, reports, summaries, letters, related to an indictment or verbatim transcripts used by government agents or employees to testify at trial. This also includes a witness's grand jury testimony, if the witness testified at trial.

After the government's witness testifies, the court must, upon motion of the defendant, order the government to produce any statement of the witness in the government's possession relating to the subject matter as to which the witness testified. The court's denial of such a motion by a defendant is reversible error, although the court need not order the disclosure sua sponte. The usual remedy for failure of the government to produce the documents is a mistrial and dismissal of criminal charges against the defendant.

== Overview ==
The Jencks Act was named for Clinton Jencks, seen here in Salt of the Earth, a movie about his struggles.

The Jencks Act was enacted by the United States Congress in response to the 1957 Supreme Court decision in Jencks v. United States, in which the Court established various rules for the availability and production of statements of prosecution witnesses in federal criminal trials.

Clinton Jencks, born in Colorado Springs, Colorado in 1918, was a labor organizer in New Mexico. In 1954, he was convicted of lying about being a member of the Communist Party of the United States. During his trial, the government refused to produce documents relied upon by prosecution witnesses who were FBI informants, a move that prompted the passage of the act.

Clinton Jencks starred in the 1954 movie Salt of the Earth which was a dramatized version of his struggles organizing labor.

== The Jencks Act ==
By the Act, Congress exercised its power to define the rules that should govern this particular area in the trial of criminal cases instead of leaving the matter of lawmaking to the courts. The Act, and not the Supreme Court decision in the Jencks case, governs the production of statements of government witnesses in a federal criminal trial. The Jencks Act is constitutional as an exercise of congressional power to prescribe rules of procedure for the federal courts. In some instances however, the statute may be overridden by an accused's constitutional right to disclosure of exculpatory evidence.

The Jencks Act governs production of statements and reports of prosecution witnesses during federal criminal trials. The Act provides that in any criminal prosecution brought by the United States, no statement or report in the possession of the United States which was made by a government witness or prospective government witness (other than the defendant) shall be the subject of subpoena, discovery or inspection until the witness called by the United States has testified on direct examination in the trial of the case. After testimony of the witness, called by the government on direct examination, the court must, on motion of the defendant, order the United States to produce any statement of the witness in the possession of the government. If the entire contents of any such statement relate to the subject matter of the testimony of the witness, the court shall order it to be delivered directly to the defendant for his examination and use.

=== Definition ===
Under the Jencks Act, a "statement" of a prosecution witness is:

1. A written statement made by the witness and signed or otherwise adopted or approved by him;
2. A stenographic, mechanical, electrical or other recording, or a transcription of it, which is substantially verbatim recital of an oral statement made by the witness to an agent of the Government and recorded contemporaneously with the making of such oral statement; or
3. A statement, however taken or recorded, or a transcription of it, made by the witness to a grand jury.

If the government does not deliver a witness's Jencks statement to the defendant, the court may strike the witness's testimony or declare a mistrial.

The Jencks Act has been characterized as intending to assure defendants of their right to confront their accusers under the Sixth Amendment. Its provisions are not a constitutional mandate. Its requirements do not rise to constitutional stature. The Confrontation Clause of the Sixth Amendment is not necessarily violated by the government's failure to produce Jencks Act material, but may be violated by preventing the ability to confront government witnesses.

== Brady material ==
In Brady v. Maryland it was ruled that the suppression of evidence favorable to an accused violates due process, irrespective of the good or bad faith of the prosecutor, where such evidence is material to the guilt or punishment of the accused. The failure of the government to produce exculpatory evidence may or may not fall within the confines of the Jencks Act. In some cases, the production of documents must be made at a time prior to that required by the Jencks Act. The Brady rule may require the prosecutor to disclose grand jury testimony prior to trial, if the information is exculpatory, as well as other Brady material.

In United States v. Anderson, when Brady material is contained within Jencks Act material disclosure is generally timely if the government complies with the Jencks Act.

The Jencks Act applies to statements "in the possession of the United States". This means in the possession of the federal prosecutor.

Any information in control of the court reporter or the trial court is not subject to the Jencks Act. The Act does not affect material in control of state, as opposed to federal agencies.

It is important that requests made prior to trial which are denied on the basis of a statement by the prosecution that "the material is not in our possession" be reasserted at trial in front of the court. Otherwise, the court will consider the request to have been abandoned.

== Subpoena of material ==
The Jencks Act provides that no material shall be subject to subpoena, discovery or inspection until the said witness has testified on direct examination in the trial of the case. In context, the word trial means a judicial proceeding conducted for the purpose of determining the guilt or innocence of a person, and according to the statutory language, the defense is not entitled to production of a witness' statement under the Act after the witness has testified at a preliminary hearing.

The bar against compulsory disclosure prior to the testimony of the witness whose statement is sought cannot be circumvented by resort to the Freedom of Information Act, or Rule 16 of the Federal Rules of Criminal Procedure.

It is left to the discretion of the trial court to determine whether Jencks material can be delivered before trial. This can be done to expedite a trial involving many witnesses. Disclosure of material may be required because of the Brady doctrine.

Material may not be excluded from production because it is claimed that it is the "work product" of government lawyers. In a related manner, the production of a final report does not exclude the production of preliminary drafts.

Tape recordings of an interview between a government agent and a government witness is producible under the Jencks Act after the witness has testified, if the recording relates to the witness' testimony. Composite drawings made from photographs are not producible. Photographs, if they relate to a witness' statement must be produced. Notes taken by a prosecutor or a law enforcement officer pertaining to an interview with a potential government witness may be subject to production under the Jencks Act if the witness testifies at trial.

== Oral statements ==
An oral statement which has never been transcribed in any fashion is not a "statement" within the meaning of the Act. Moreover the Act does not require law enforcement officers to make any record of an interview, nor to submit interview notes to the witness for approval so as to generate a statement which is producible under the Act. Notes that are signed, adopted or approved by the witness are generally subject to subpoena. Those that are not cannot be ordered to be produced. Notes that are only of one word references and short phrases are not producible. Investigator's notes made from memory several days after interviewing a witness are not "verbatim" under the meaning of the Act, and hence not subject to subpoena.

On police officer's notes on statements of another were not "statements" within the meaning of the Jencks Act where there was no evidence that such notes were ever approved by the officer or that his words were recorded verbatim.

Records of surveillance activities are not Jencks Act statements even though they have been transmitted by one government agent to another.

Notes produced during the course of surveillance need not be preserved or produced.

A statement by a government witness before a grand jury is producible under Jencks Act to the extent that it relates to the subject matter of the trial testimony.

Such a statement is reproducible even though it has not been transcribed.

== Grand jury information ==
Although the government is obliged to make a record of all testimony before the grand jury, it is under no obligation to create producible material under the Jencks Act by calling key witnesses before the grand jury.

The provision of the Jencks Act relating to disclosure of a witness' grand jury testimony address only disclosure at trial. Pretrial disclosure of such testimony is governed by Rule 6 (e) of the Federal Rules of Criminal Procedure.

The Act does not bar the pretrial disclosure of grand jury testimony where requirements of Rule 6 (e) for such disclosure have been met.

Sometimes courts will hold an in-camera hearing to determine if the material is relevant under the Act, it is not necessary for the production of documents.

It is generally necessary that the defense make a motion for the production of the prior statement of a government witness under the Jencks Act.

The motion of the defense for production should be made at the close of the testimony of the witnesses from whom the documents are sought. The request should not be made at the close of the prosecution's case, nor prior to the close of the trial.

== Pre-trial conference, document production ==
The identification and production of Jencks Act material may also be addressed at a pretrial conference. It is usual for the defense to receive the material outside the purview of the jury to avoid inference that the material is damaging to the defendant. If the material is not relevant, or helpful for impeachment, defense council may decide not to use it.

Requiring production of Jencks material in front of the jury is reversible error.

There must be some reason to believe that the documents actually exist. This can be documented when the witness uses the document to testify from, or by testimony that the document exists.

The decision whether a document should be produced is made by the trial court and not the prosecution.

== Determining if the documents should be produced ==
Once issues concerning the producibility of a requested statement have been raised, it is the duty of the court to conduct some sort of inquiry. This is a question for the court, and not the jury.

A trial court's decision of what material must be produced under the Act is subject to review under the "clearly erroneous" standard.

=== Manner of determination ===
It is within the discretion of the court to determine in the most appropriate manner whether a requested document is a producible statement. To determine whether a document is a statement under the Act, the court may

- Conduct a voir dire examination of the declarant on the witness stand.
- Conduct a hearing outside the presence of the jury to examine evidence extrinsic to the statement.
- Examine the requested document in camera.

The act requires in camera inspection to resolve any question as to whether or to what extent the document relates to the subject matter of the witness' testimony.

The determination of the production and admissibility of documents under the Jencks Act is not adversarial in nature, but only a proceeding to discharge the responsibility to enforce the Act. It is not the responsibility of the defense to prove that the document should be produced.

If after in camera inspection, of the requested document the court determines that only part of it relates to the subject matter of the witness's testimony, the court must excise those parts which do not relate to the witness' testimony.

The sections to be excluded is in the discretion of the court.

Material cannot be excluded simply because the prosecution claims it is a matter of internal security, or confidentiality of the information.

If the material is deemed to be work product of the prosecution, it can be excluded.

If the defendant objects to the excision of parts of a document, the full text of the document must be preserved on the record for purposes of appeal.

Notes prepared by law enforcement agents of an interview with a potential government witness may be subject to production under the Jencks Act, provided the witness testifies at the trial. Some government practices have led to the destruction of such notes prior to any trial. This is not, of itself, considered to be bad faith.

A judicial hearing may be held to determine if the destruction of the notes was bad faith. If it is the normal procedure of the agency to destroy notes, it will generally not be considered to be bad faith.

The Second Circuit has ruled that agent notes used to prepare a final report must also be preserved.

If the prosecution elects not to comply with the order to produce Jencks Material, the court shall strike the testimony of the witness and continue with the trial. If the interests of justice require such, the trial is properly called a mistrial.

It is incumbent upon the defense to file a motion with the court that it believes that the failure of the prosecution to produce the document is a violation of the Jencks Act. If the interests of justice require such, the trial is properly called a mistrial.

Although rough notes of an interview with a witness are producible, under Jencks Act where such notes are a substantially verbatim recital of the witness' oral statements, failure to do so is probably harmless where the notes are substantially the same as a report based on the notes and released to the defense.

== Federal Rule 26.2 ==
The provisions of the Jencks Act have been substantially incorporated into Rule 26.2 of the Federal Rules of Criminal Procedure. This is due to the notion that provisions which are purely procedural in nature should appear in the Rules, rather than in Title 18 of the United States Code. Rule 26.2 extends the provisions of the Jencks Act by providing that statements subject to production at trial are not only those of prosecution witnesses, but those of any witness other than the defendant. The Rule does not alter the Jencks Act schedule for production of statements, nor does it relieve a defendant seeking production of Jencks material from the necessity of making a request for production at the trial stage of the proceeding.

== Other cases involving the Jencks Act ==
=== Rosenberg v. United States, 1959 ===
In Rosenberg v. United States, 1959, the United States Supreme Court ruled that a letter written by a government witness to the FBI stating that her memory as to the commission of the alleged offense charged against the defendant had dimmed in the 3 years that had passed since the time of the offense, and that to refresh her failing memory she would have to reread the original statement she had given to the FBI, was producible under the Jencks Act.

=== United States v. Ellenbogen, 1965 ===
In United States v. Ellenbogen, 1965, a prosecution for bribing a purchasing agent of the General Services Administration and for conspiring to commit similar offenses, wherein the purchasing agent pleaded guilty prior to the trial and was the principal witness for the government in the defendant's case, it was held that the trial court's refusal to allow the production of a signed sworn statement of the purchasing agent in which he explained in detail his similar unlawful dealings with bidders other than the defendant, on the ground that such statement had nothing to do with the present case, was error where on direct examination the agent was examined by the government on the point of such other dealings as covered in the requested statement. Noting that prior statements of a witness that "relate generally to the events and activities testified to" by him must be produced in the Jencks Act, the court said that since the statement in question related to the subject matter as to which the witness had testified, the statute left no room for the trial court, nor for the present court, to speculate as to how useful this statement would be for purposes of cross-examination or how important such cross-examination would be to the defendant's case.

=== United States v. Borelli, 1964 ===
In United States v. Borelli, an accomplice had testified for the prosecution at the trial of the defendant, it was held that the refusal to permit the production of a letter written by the accomplice to the government, in which he offered his assistance to the government in return for special consideration for himself, was error where such refusal was based on the ground that the letter did not "relate" to the subject matter to which the accomplice had testified. The court said there was no reason why a statement that would support impeachment for bias and interest does not "relate" to the witness' testimony as much as a statement permitting impeachment for faulty memory as was involved in Rosenberg v. United States (see case supra), and that the word "relate" as used in the statute is not limited to factual narrative.
