= What Do Men Want? =

1921 film

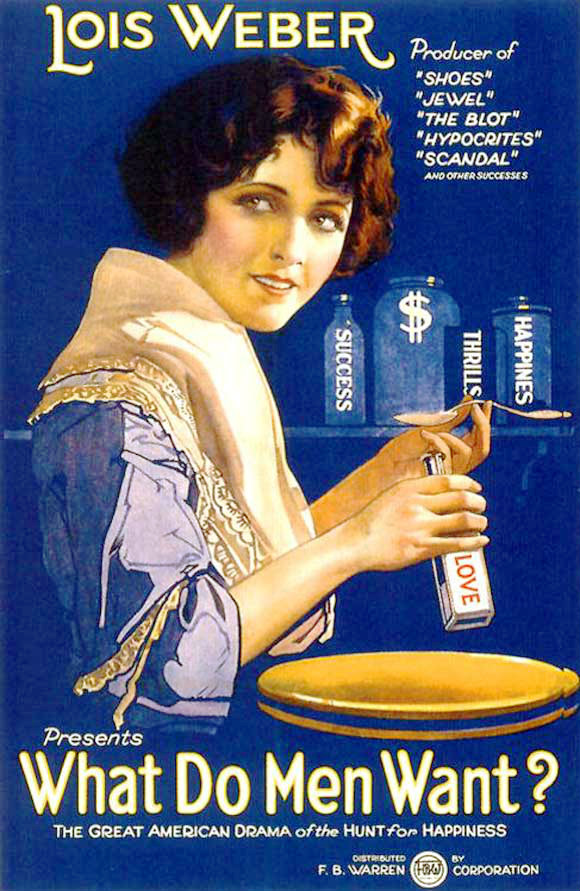
- Lobby poster
- Directed by: Lois Weber
- Written by: Lois Weber
- Produced by: Lois Weber
- Starring: Claire Windsor
- Cinematography: Dal Clawson
- Distributed by: Wid Gunning Inc.
- Release date: November 13, 1921
- Running time: 70 minutes
- Country: United States
- Language: Silent (English intertitles)

What Do Men Want? (1921) by Lois Weber

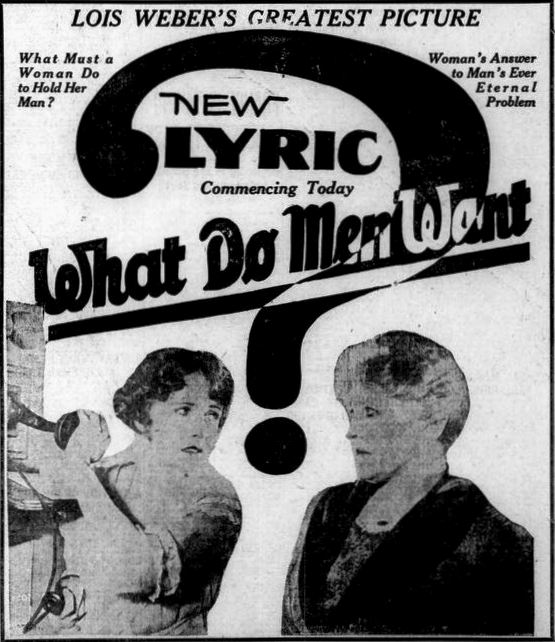
advertisement.

What Do Men Want? is a 1921 American silent drama film written, produced, and directed by Lois Weber and starring her muse Claire Windsor. Surviving reels were released on DVD and Blu-ray in 2018.

== Plot ==
As described in a film magazine, at the girls school gymnasium in the small town of Oakdale everyone is happily discussing the upcoming ball with the exception of Bertha (Kessler), who is left to herself by the other girls because her father is in an insane asylum and she is poor and plain. At the ball, the belle is Hallie (Windsor), who is sought by all the young men while Bertha looks on, a lonely wall flower. Brothers and automobile mechanics Frank (Glendon) and Arthur (Hackathorne) are both in love with Hallie, and at Frank's request Arthur asks Bertha to dance. Her gratitude causes her to fall in love with him, and a series of events finally lead to her end her life by drowning. In the meantime Frank and Hallie are married and, owing to the success of an invention of his, living comfortable and happy lives. Several children come and the home is apparently an ideal one. Then Frank is seized by the spirit of unrest and for several years domestic happiness is conspicuous by its absence from the home. Frank takes up a residence in the city and becomes entangled with the fast set, his particular attraction being to "the other girl." Hallie devotes her time to her children and unavailing efforts to hold her husband's waning love. In her loneliness she is about to surrender to the blandishments of Yost (Cooley), the evil influence of the village, when her inherent honesty asserts itself and she sends Yost away. But Frank has arrived on one of his visits to his home just in time to have seen Yost enter the house, and waits outside, intending to see Hallie alone to ask her forgiveness and seek reconciliation for all that he has done. After a long wait, not seeing Yost leave the house, Frank rushes in and accuses Hallie. He then leaves, intending to go away forever, when he meets his brother Arthur, who explains matters and convinces Frank of Hallie's innocence. After a real reconciliation with his wife, Frank discovers the answer to the title's question.

== Cast ==
- Claire Windsor as Hallie, The Girl
- J. Frank Glendon as Frank, The Youth
- George Hackathorne as Arthur, His Brother
- Hallam Cooley as Yost, The Evil Influence
- Edith Kessler as Bertha, The Unfortunate
- Billy Bowes as Extra (uncredited)
- Esther Ralston as Extra (uncredited)

== Production ==
Although Weber had signed a distribution contract with Paramount Pictures in 1919 and the studio had screened this and three other of her titles with Weber, Paramount declined to distribute What Do Men Want?, possibly due to its subject matter involving an unwed mother and suicide. As part of the deal to distribute Weber's film The Blot (1921), F.B. Warren also released What Do Men Want?

== Reception ==
After the film's premiere at Manhattan's Lyric Theatre on November 13, 1921, The New York Times, while praising Weber for her casting and the technical aspects of the film, and also the performance of Claire Windsor, dismissed the film as a "simplified sermon" that provided "pat answers" which ignored "the real facts of life", which it considers "incompetent, irrelevant and immaterial".

== Preservation status ==
Incomplete prints of What Do Men Want? are maintained at the Library of Congress and UCLA Film & Television Archive.
