= South Pacific Playground =

- Directed by: Ken G. Hall
- Produced by: Ken G. Hall
- Cinematography: Ron Horner
- Production company: Cinesound Productions
- Release date: December 1953
- Running time: 20 mins
- Country: Australia
- Language: English
- Budget: £2500

South Pacific Playground is a 1953 Australian documentary directed by Ken G. Hall. It is a travelogue of Sydney beach suburbs, in particular Manly. It was released as a supporting featurette in some cinemas.

The movie was meant to be the first of a series of panoramic featurettes being produced locally by Cinesound Studios in full colour. It was shot in Gevacolor.

The film was screened privately to the Queen and Duke of Edinburgh in Canberra during their Royal Tour of 1954.

== Reception ==
The Catholic Weekly wrote, "The film has some faults. Its beautiful photography is marred several times by glare, and also by the motion of the camera. Sensitive ears will not take kindly to a bad grammatical error the commentator makes at one stage. And perhaps some will grow tired of looking at the same girls parading in front of the camera. But for all that it is a beautiful piece of work. One feels there are many other places in our country waiting for the cameraman to do justice to them."

The Bulletin called it "a magnificent photographic tour of Sydney's northern beaches from Manly to Palm Beach. The producer hasn't missed a trick. Into the 20 minutes' running-time he has crowded every possible diversion for the pleasure-seeker. In particular the shots of surfing and surf-skiing are first-rate. If there is a fault it is that the colour (by Gevacolor) is occasionally too heavy."

The film is described as "a particularly fine short film" in the Motion Picture Directory. The Hollywood Reporter mentions its success.

According to the Film Censorship Board "This film is enjoying great popularity with Australian audiences and, when screened in Other Countries, will assuredly provide excellent publicity for Australia".
