= Hop, the Devil's Brew =

1916 film

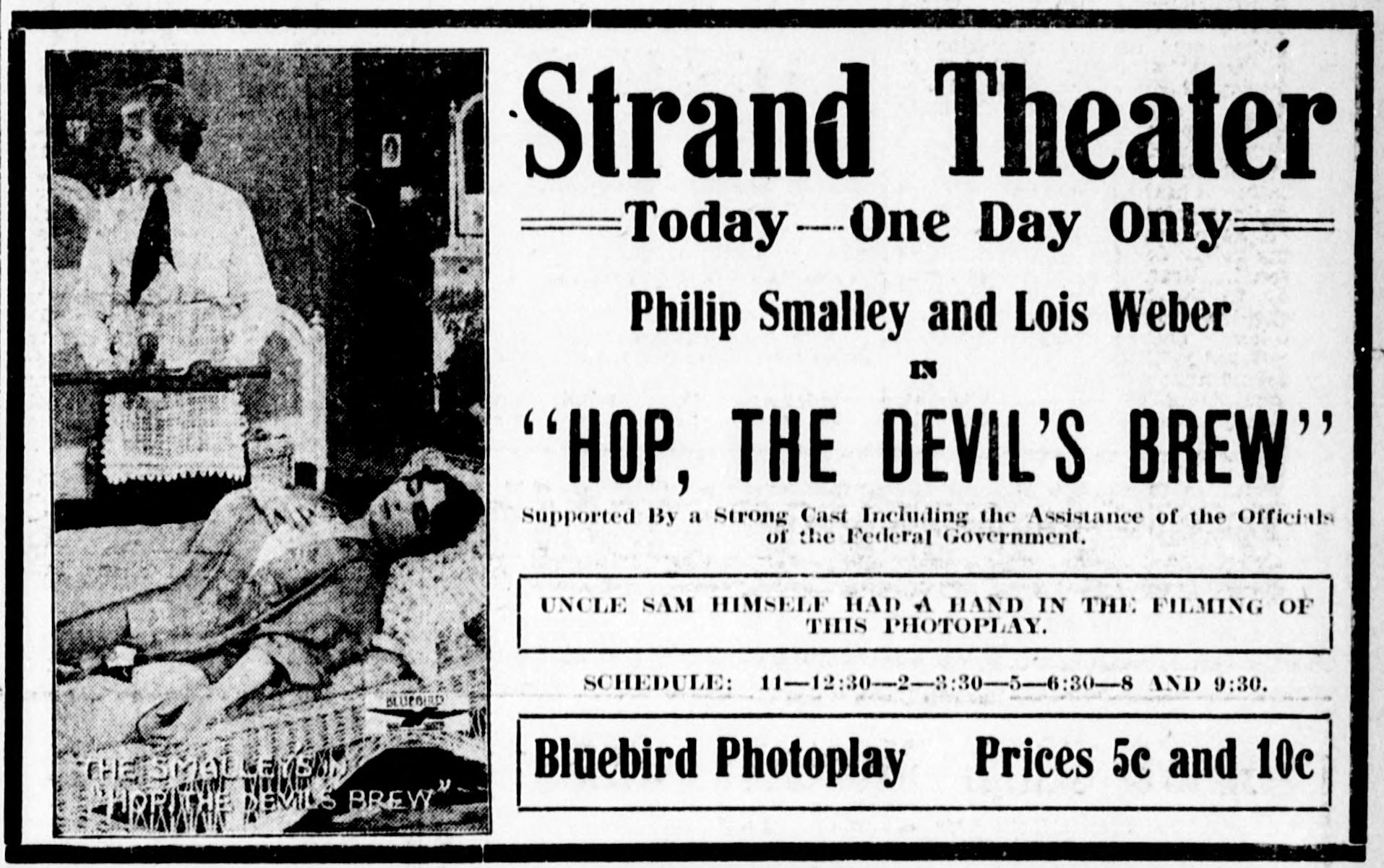
- Newspaper advertisement
- Directed by: Lois Weber; Phillips Smalley
- Written by: Lois Weber
- Starring: Lois Weber; Phillips Smalley
- Cinematography: Al Siegler; Frank D. Williams
- Production company: Bluebird Photoplays
- Distributed by: Bluebird Photoplays
- Release date: February 14, 1916
- Running time: 5 reels
- Country: United States
- Languages: Silent film (English intertitles)

Hop, the Devil's Brew is a 1916 American silent film directed by Lois Weber and Phillips Smalley. Inspired by an exposé of opium trafficking in the Saturday Evening Post, the semidocumentary film starred Smalley as a Customs official and Weber as his opium-addicted wife.

The film is presumed lost.

== Plot ==
Customs agent Ward Jansen (Phillips Smalley) is sent to China to conduct an investigation into opium smuggling. His wife, Lydia (Lois Weber), is the daughter of local politician William Waters (Charles Hammond). Left behind in San Francisco and grieving the loss of their child, Lydia resorts to the drug and becomes an addict. When Jansen returns, he notices his wife's strange behavior but does not attribute it to drug addiction. Jansen continues his investigation in San Francisco, and some of the methods of smuggling rings and customs inspectors are depicted. The investigation eventually leads Jansen to raid an opium den in Chinatown where he discovers his wife and learns of her addiction. Jansen's investigation ultimately reveals that his father-in-law is a key player in the smuggling operation. Discovery, as well as guilt over his daughter's plight, leads to Waters' suicide. Jansen supports his wife and helps her through withdrawal to recovery.

== Cast ==
- Phillips Smalley as Ward Jansen
- Lois Weber as Lydia Jansen
- Charles Hammond as William Waters
- Juan de le Cruz as Con Leech
- Marie Walcamp as Jane Leech

== Production ==
Hop, the Devil's Brew was the fourth picture produced by Bluebird Photoplays, a studio set up by Universal aimed at producing high-quality, feature-length dramas. Weber was inspired by a Saturday Evening Post series of articles by Rufus Steele about the government's war against the opium trade. It was one of a number of films she made during an arc in her career in which she focused on controversial social issues.

It was shot on location in San Francisco, reportedly including Chinatown opium dens, the waterfront, and areas of criminal activity.

According to the producers, the film was sanctioned by and made with the assistance of the U.S. Customs Service and the U.S. Secret Service. (Note: The Smoking Opium Exclusion Act of 1909 prohibited the importation of smoking grade opium; the Secret Service was tasked with assisting the Customs Service in the investigation of opium smuggling, focusing on San Francisco and San Diego.) Scenes about illegal opium traffic and law enforcement methods were advertised as based on actual cases.

== Reception ==
The film was released February 14, 1916, to critical approval. The Variety review observed, "To say that [the Smalleys] have done their work well would be doing them an injustice. They have turned out a picture that is chock full of interest and thrills ... every minute has something to further the plot." Moving Picture World called it "excellent, considered either as dramatic entertainment, or as a faithful depiction of actual conditions" and praised the acting as "restrained" rather than "theatrical", doing credit to its authenticity.

Although reviewers found the movie's treatment of the potentially lurid topic serious rather than exploitative, censors in Chicago and Pennsylvania objected to some elements. The Pennsylvania censors passed the opium-smoking scenes, but cut a close-up of the dead baby's shoes.
