= The Fine Feathers =

- Directed by: Lois Weber; Phillips Smalley
- Written by: Lois Weber (scenario)
- Produced by: Rex Motion Picture Company
- Starring: Phillips Smalley; Lois Weber
- Distributed by: Motion Picture Distributors and Sales Company
- Release date: February 1, 1912
- Country: USA
- Language: Silent..English titles

The Fine Feathers is a 1912 silent film dramatic short directed by and starring Lois Weber. It was produced the Rex Motion Picture Company and distributed six months before the formation of Universal Film Manufacturing Company.

This film is preserved in the Library of Congress collection.

== Cast ==
- Phillips Smalley - Arthur Vaughn
- Lois Weber - The Artist's Model
- Charles De Forrest
