= The Jew's Christmas =

1913 American silent film by Lois Weber and Phillips Smalley

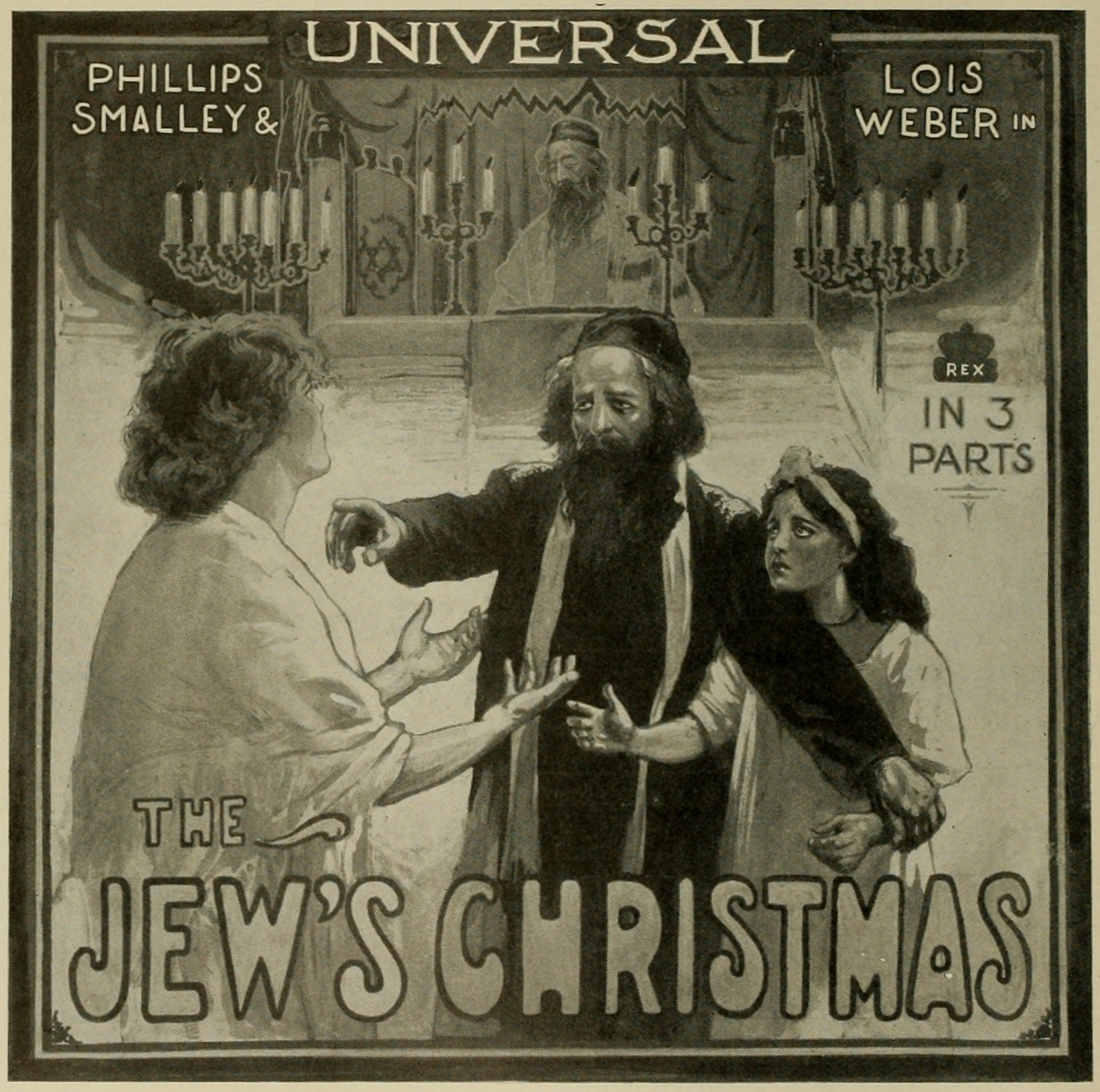
- Theatrical Release Poster
- Directed by: Lois Weber; Phillips Smalley
- Written by: Lois Weber
- Starring: Phillips Smalley; Lois Weber; Lule Warrenton; Ella Hall
- Production company: Universal Pictures
- Release date: December 18, 1913
- Country: United States

The Jew's Christmas is a 1913 silent film. The film was written by Lois Weber, and directed by Weber and her husband Phillips Smalley. The first American film to include a rabbi as a character, it was positively received, and novelized the year after its release. Modern analysts have described the film as encouraging Jewish assimilation and interfaith marriage in Judaism, and as incorporating prejudiced ideas about Jews.

== Plot ==
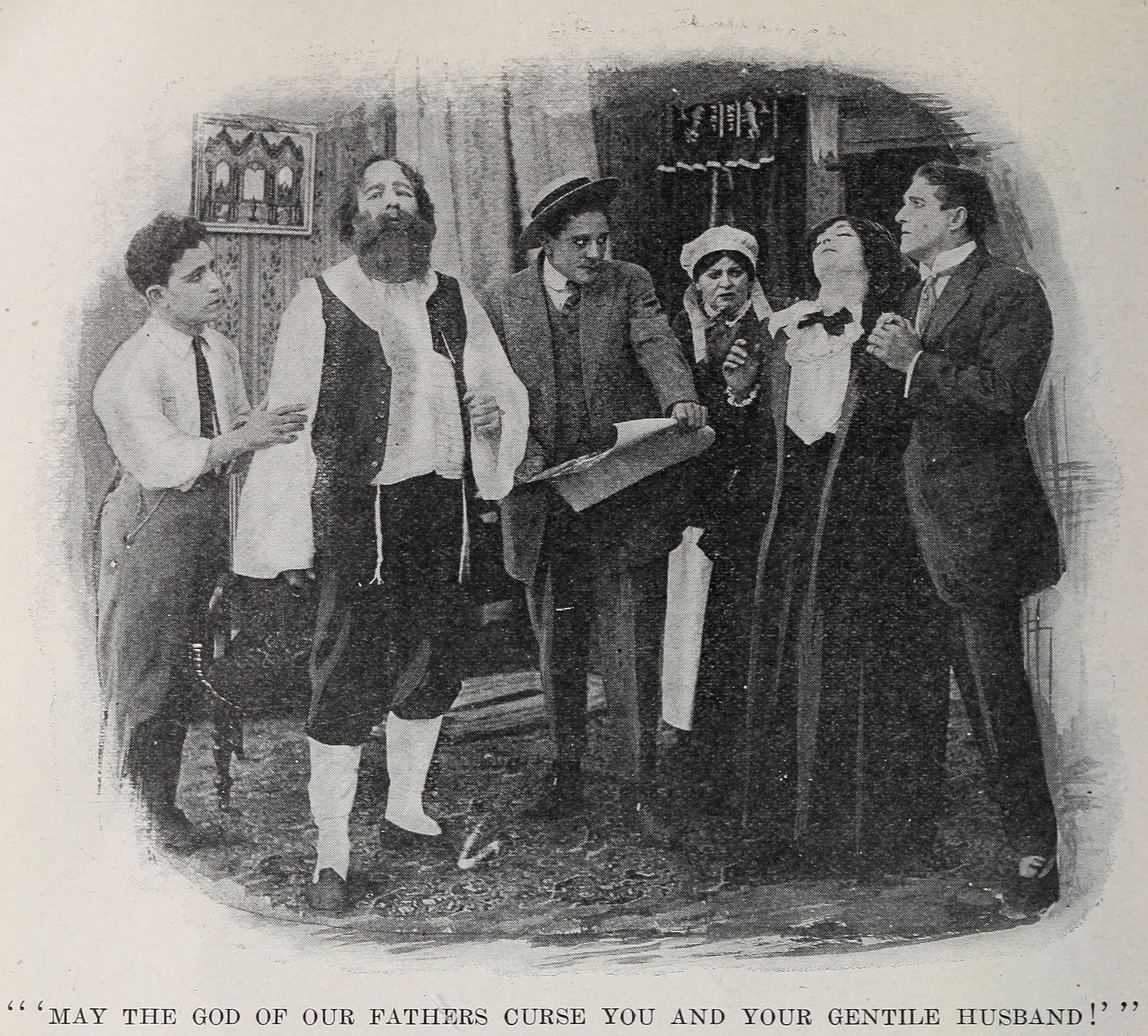
Rabbi Isaac cursing Leah Isaac and Rupert Julian, as depicted in the 1914 novelization

Leah Isaac (played by Lois Weber) is disowned by her father Rabbi Isaac (played by Phillips Smalley) after she marries Rupert Julian, a gentile coworker. Sam Isaac, the rabbi's son, is also kicked out of the house after returning home intoxicated; he subsequently vows that he will not return until the rabbi celebrates Christmas.

Rupert Julian loses his legs in a trolley accident, forcing him and Leah to sell artificial flowers while living in poverty. The couple live in a tenement directly above Rabbi Isaac's home, but the rabbi is unaware of their presence. After years pass, the rabbi befriends Rupert and Leah's daughter Eleanor, not knowing that he is her grandfather. After Eleanor, whose parents do not have the money to buy a Christmas tree, asks him why she does not have a tree while other children do, the rabbi sells a religious text in order to purchase a Christmas tree to please Eleanor, leading him to reunite with Leah and realize that he is Eleanor's grandfather. Sam Isaac returns as well with Christmas gifts for the family.

== Cast ==
- Phillips Smalley as Isaac – The Rabbi
- Lois Weber as Leah – Isaac's Daughter
- Lule Warrenton as Rachel – Isaac's Wife
- Ella Hall as Eleanor – Isaac's Granddaughter

== Production ==
The Jew's Christmas was written by Lois Weber. It was co-directed by Weber and her husband Phillips Smalley, both Christians. Production of the film was approved by Carl Laemmle of Universal Pictures, a Jew.

== Release ==
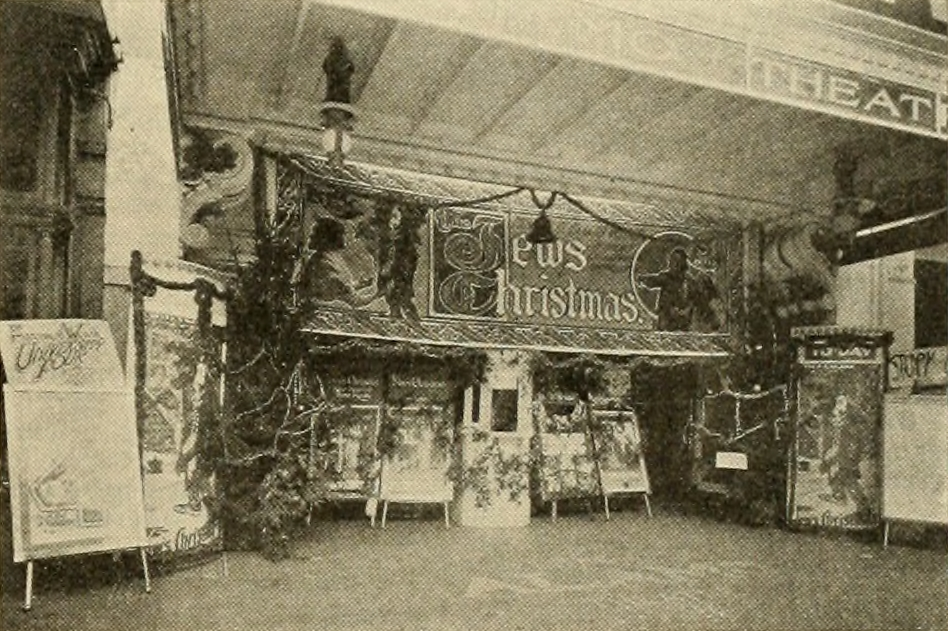
The Alamo Theater in New Orleans decorated for the release of The Jew's Christmas in December 1913

The Jew's Christmas was released in 1913, on December 18. It was a three-reel film, and the first American film to include a rabbi as a character.

=== Novelization ===
A novelization of The Jew's Christmas was written by John Olden and published in Motion Picture Story Magazine in 1914.

== Contemporary reception ==
A group of rabbis gathered to view and evaluate the film shortly before Christmas in 1913. Moving Picture World reported that the rabbis approved of the plot and the "fidelity with which the producers had followed Jewish ceremonies and customs", but disapproved of the film's title.

Also in Moving Picture World, George Blaisdell wrote a positive review of the film, but noted that "undoubtedly there will be Jews who look upon it with coldness, and some with reprobation." Blaisdell described the film as serious, educational, and "intensely human", predicting that it "will make an especially good holiday release; and its interest will not be confined to the period of merrymaking."

== Analysis ==
Modern analysis of The Jew's Christmas is based on contemporary writings about it, as well as Olden's novelization.

In 1975, Thomas Cripps wrote in the Journal of Popular Film that The Jew's Christmas was the first film to capture "the poignance of assimilation" and the originator of a theme of films that would do the same. In the same journal (now renamed Journal of Popular Film & Television) in 1987, Lester D. Friedman described the film as one of many silent films in the period which encouraged intermarriage in Judaism. In these films, Friedman states that a Jewish person married a non-Jewish person without their parents' blessing, then "either the birth of their child or some type of calamity reconciles the parents to the marriage" and "everyone finally acknowledges that love is stronger than any religious ties."

In The Forward in 2019, PJ Grisar criticized the content of the film, writing that it supports "the time-worn prejudice that suggests Jews are bigoted toward Christians and stubbornly resistant to assimilation, choosing instead to adhere to the antique laws of their faith." Grisar additionally stated that "accounts of the film suggest that its plot never truly addresses the racial hatred faced by Jews." Shelley Stamp, a professor of film at University of California, Santa Cruz, stated that rather than being "a film about anti-Semitism, it's a film about how the rabbi has to recognize the kindness of non-Jews — not the other way around." She concluded that the film was "wrapped up in the anti-Semitism of the time" but that the time period of its publication was "not a full excuse" for its content.

== See also ==
- List of Christmas films
