= Sensation Seekers =

1927 film by Lois Weber

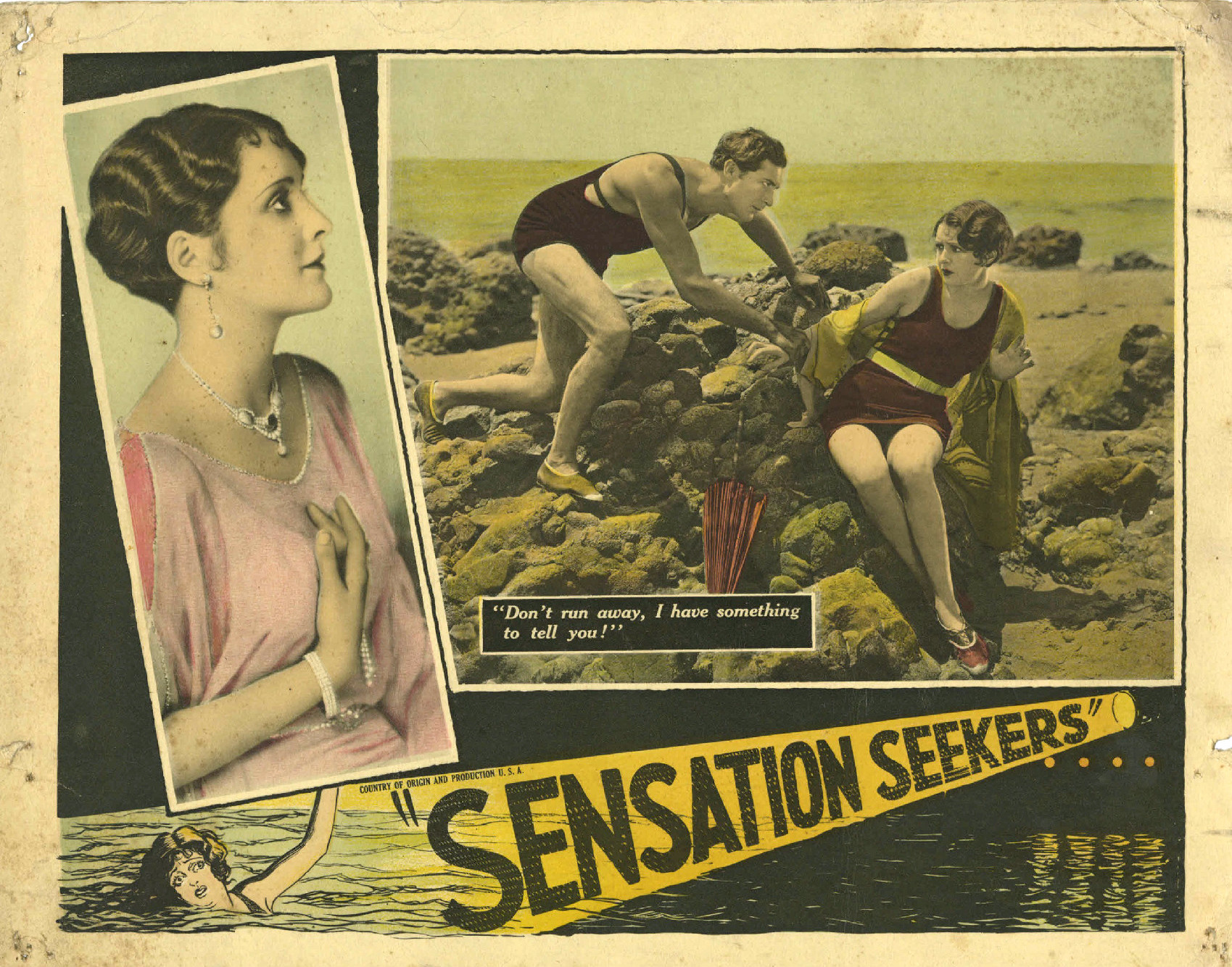
- Lobby card
- Directed by: Lois Weber
- Written by: Lois Weber (scenario)
- Based on: "Egypt" by Ernest Pascal
- Produced by: Universal Pictures; Carl Laemmle
- Starring: Billie Dove; Huntley Gordon
- Cinematography: Benjamin H. Kline
- Edited by: Maurice Pivar; Thomas Pratt
- Distributed by: Universal Pictures
- Release date: March 20, 1927
- Running time: 70 minutes; 7 reels
- Country: United States
- Language: Silent (English intertitles)

Sensation Seekers is a 1927 American silent romantic drama film directed by Lois Weber, produced and distributed by Universal Pictures, and starring Billie Dove.

== Plot ==
As described in a film magazine, Ray Sturgis, the leader of the fast younger set of a fashionable Long Island resort, is engaged to "Egypt" Hagen, another member of the set who holds no objections to roadhouse parties or the use of liquor or tobacco. The various families of this set are ardent churchgoers of the Reverend Norman Lodge's flock.

Egypt is arrested in a police raid of the roadhouse and, at her mother's bidding, the Reverend Lodge gets her free. Lodge is captivated by her misdirected efforts but does not preach. When Ray wears a costume made of newspaper headlines concerning Egypt's arrest to a fancy dress ball, she is offended and finds that she is not her old exuberant self. She is constantly in the company of Lodge and her bad reputation causes the church people to take the matter up with the Bishop.

Running away from the country club party in a daring Oriental costume, Egypt visits Lodge and his mother and, when the Bishop arrives, hides behind the door. He discovers her and cautions Lodge in her presence. Lodge wants to marry her and they admit their love, but her humiliation causes her to run away with Sturgis that night. The yacht they are on is wrecked but Lodge and the Bishop, following, rescue Egypt while Sturgis is drowned, whereupon the Bishop sees that it is true love and consents to perform a marriage ceremony.

== Cast ==
- Billie Dove as Luena 'Egypt' Hagen
- Huntley Gordon as Ray Sturgis
- Raymond Bloomer as Reverend Lodge
- Peggy Montgomery as Margaret Todd
- Will Gregory as Colonel Emory Todd
- Helen Gilmore as Mrs. Todd
- Edith Yorke as Mrs. Hagen
- Phillips Smalley as Mr. Hagen
- Cora Williams as Mrs. W. Symme
- Sidney Arundel as Deacon W. Symme
- Blackie Thompson as Rabbitt Smythe (credited as Clarence Thompson)
- Nora Cecil as Mrs. Lodge
- Frances Dale as Tottie
- Lillian Lawrence as Tibbett Sister
- Fanchon Frankel as Tibbett Sister
- Tom Ricketts (uncredited)
- Walter Brennan as Below Deck Yacht Crewman (uncredited)
- Eddie Foster Speakeasy Patron (uncredited)

== Preservation ==
A print of Sensation Seekers is in the UCLA Film and Television Archive. The trailer also survives.
