= Suspense (1913 film) =

1913 film

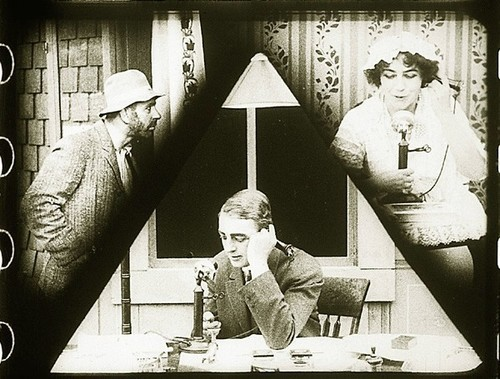
- Film still
- Directed by: Phillips Smalley; Lois Weber
- Written by: Lois Weber
- Starring: Lois Weber; Val Paul
- Production company: Rex Motion Picture Company
- Distributed by: Universal Film Manufacturing Company
- Release date: July 6, 1913
- Running time: 10 minutes
- Country: United States
- Language: Silent with English intertitles

Suspense is a 1913 American silent short film thriller directed by Lois Weber and Phillips Smalley. Weber also wrote the scenario and stars in the film with Valentine Paul. The film features early examples of a split screen shot and a car chase.

== Plot ==
Suspense 1913, full film

A servant leaves a new mother with only a written letter of notice, placing her key under the doormat as she leaves. Her exit attracts the attention of a tramp to the house. As the husband has previously phoned that he is working late, the wife decides not to ring back when she finds the note but does ring back when she sees the tramp. Her husband listens, horrified, as she documents the break-in and then the tramp cuts the line. The husband steals a car and is immediately pursued by the car's owner and the police, who nearly but don't quite manage to jump into the stolen car during a high-speed chase. The husband manages to gain a lead over the police but then accidentally strikes a man smoking in the road and checks to see that he is okay. Meanwhile, the tramp is breaking into the room where the wife has locked herself and her baby, violently thrusting himself through the wood door, carrying a large knife. At that moment the husband arrives, pursued by the police. As the husband runs towards the home, the police fire at him, panicking the hobo. He runs down the stairs, to be met by the husband at the front door. After a short struggle, he overpowers the hobo, who is then grabbed by the police. The husband runs upstairs, everything is explained, and all is forgiven as the couple embrace.

== Cast ==
- Lois Weber as The Wife
- Valentine Paul as The Husband
- Douglas Gerrard as The Pursuer
- Sam Kaufman (1885–1972) as The Tramp

== Release ==
Suspense was released on July 6, 1913, by the Rex Motion Picture Company.

== Reception ==
"best nickelodeon film ever made" — Russell Merritt (1941-2023)

"The threat to the woman in Suspense is explicitly sexual"

"The film is a sensory feast with clever use of mirrors and imaginative visual composition". — moviessilently.com

"With its stark title and startling visuals, more realistic characters, less reliance on explicit narrative and instead favoring more subtle story-telling, this bears less resemblance to its contemporaries than to the films that would later be created by Hitchcock" — Voidsville Follies —

== Legacy ==
An original print of the film is preserved at the film archive of the British Film Institute.

In 2020, it was selected for preservation in the United States National Film Registry by the Library of Congress as being "culturally, historically, or aesthetically significant".

It was released on DVD/Blu-ray in 2018 in a box set called "Pioneers: First Women Filmmakers", with a new score by composer Skylar Nam.

External videos
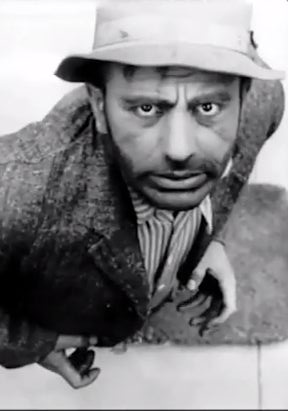
- Sam Kaufman (1885-1972) as The Tramp
- Anne Morra, Associate Curator of Film, speaks about Lois Weber and Phillips Smalley’s film Suspense: via YouTube; from MoMA Celebrates 1913: Lois Weber and Phillips Smalley’s Suspense, Museum of Modern Art

== Lon Chaney false assertion ==
The film has been falsely asserted as Lon Chaney's earliest extant film based on a brief scene in which a similar individual appears on camera. The documentary Lon Chaney: A Thousand Faces states that his film debut occurred after his wife's suicide attempt in April 1913 and that "his earliest films were made at the first studio to open in Hollywood, Nestor Studios." Though well-known Chaney scholar Michael Blake's A Thousand Faces: Lon Chaney's Unique Artistry in Motion Pictures does note that the possibility exists of Chaney's performing in a role during a period of unemployment in 1912, it also notes that he rejoined Clarence Kolb and Max Dill's company in San Francisco, California, in September 1912. Blake specifically dismisses Chaney's appearance in Suspense in his book A Thousand Faces: Lon Chaney's Unique Artistry in Motion Pictures. Chaney website creator Jon C. Mirsalis originally attributed the appearance of the hobo who is struck by a car to Chaney but, after examining a high-resolution digital scan frame by frame, has recanted his earlier claim and now concedes that the individual is not Chaney.

The Internet Movie Database lists Lon Chaney as having an unconfirmed and uncredited brief role; however, this is disputed by silentera.com, which states "Despite attributions to the contrary, Lon Chaney does not appear in the film."

== See also ==
- List of films featuring home invasions
