= A Chapter in Her Life =

1923 film by Lois Weber

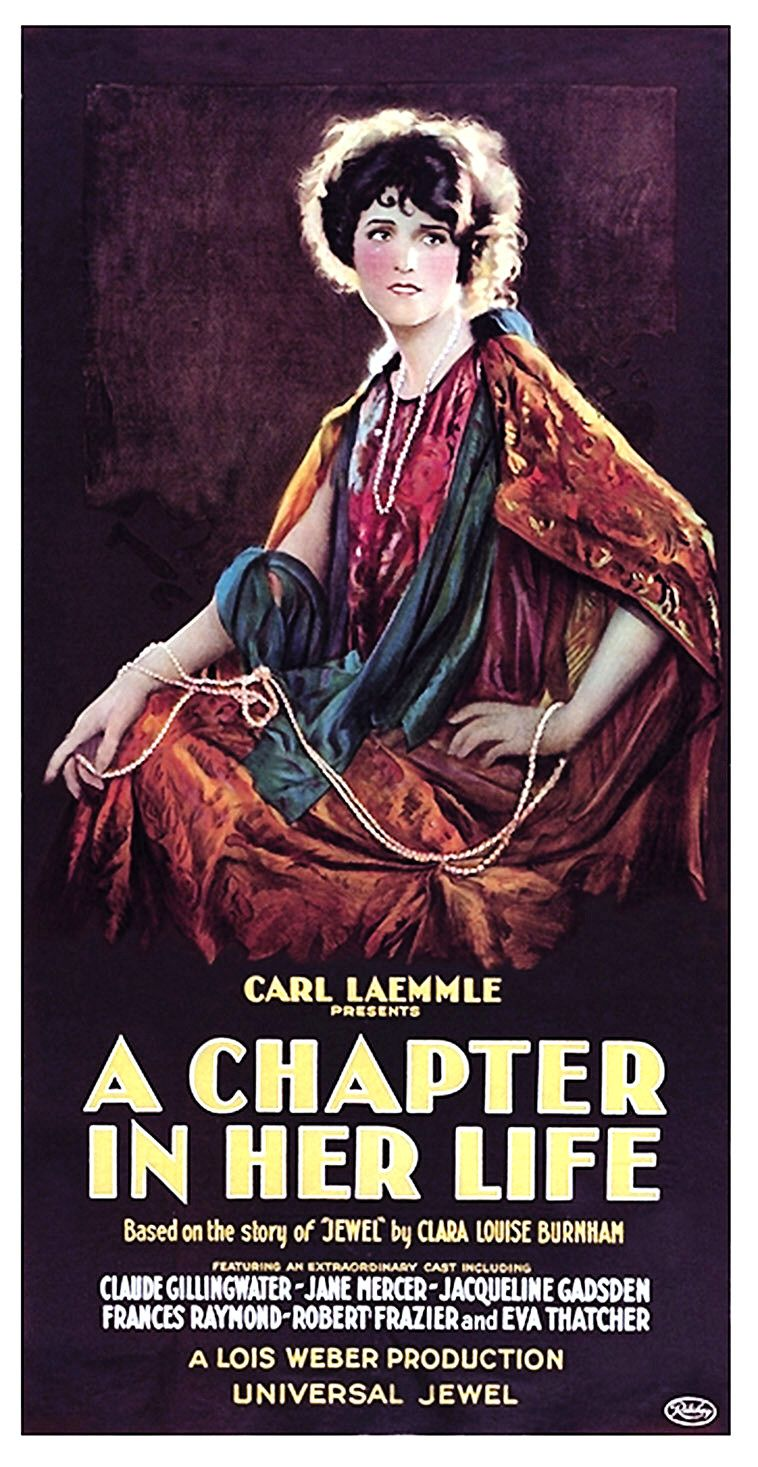
- Theatrical poster
- Directed by: Lois Weber
- Written by: Doris Schroeder; Lois Weber (adaptation)
- Based on: Jewel: A Chapter in Her Life by Clara Louise Burnham
- Produced by: Universal-Jewel
- Starring: Claude Gillingwater; Jane Mercer; Jacqueline Gadsden; Robert Frazer
- Cinematography: Benjamin H. Kline
- Distributed by: Universal Pictures
- Release date: September 17, 1923
- Running time: 6 reels
- Country: United States
- Language: Silent (English intertitles)

A Chapter in Her Life is a 1923 American drama film based on the novel Jewel: A Chapter in Her Life by Clara Louise Burnham. The film was directed by Lois Weber. She had previously adapted the same novel as the 1915 film Jewel, which she co-directed (uncredited) with her then-husband and collaborator Phillips Smalley. Weber made this film shortly after her divorce from Smalley.

The film

== Plot ==
Jewel is a young granddaughter who stays with her grizzled, angry grandfather while her parents are overseas on business. Anger and squabbling amongst the family are brought to heel through love, understanding and the teachings of Christian Science through Jewel's pure sweet love for others and trust in Divine Love.

== Cast ==
- Claude Gillingwater as Mr. Everingham
- Jane Mercer as Jewel
- Jacqueline Gadsden as Eloise Everingham
- Frances Raymond as Madge Everingham
- Robert Frazer as Dr. Ballard
- Eva Thatcher as Mrs. Forbes
- Ralph Yearsley as Zeke Forbes
- Fred Thomson as Nat Bonnell
- Beth Rayon as Susan

== Preservation status ==
Prints of A Chapter in Her Life are held by the Cineteca Del Friuli, George Eastman Museum, Library of Congress and BFI National Film and Television Archive.
