= The Blot =

1921 film by Lois Weber, Phillips Smalley

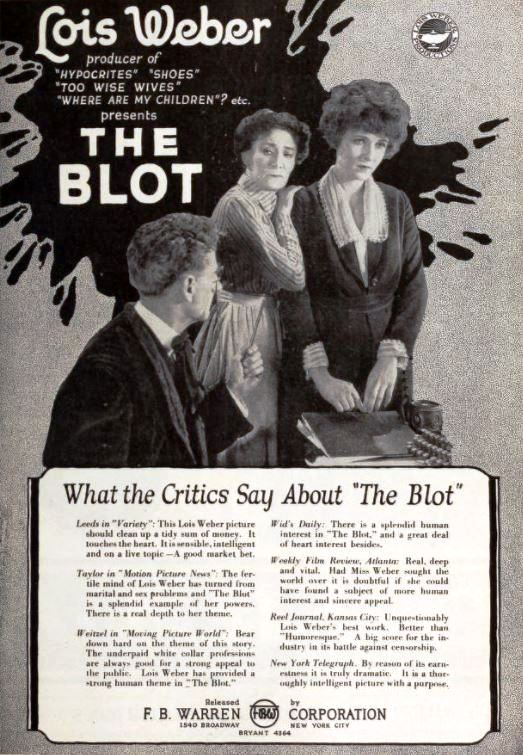
- Advertisement from Exhibitors Herald, 1921
- Directed by: Lois Weber
- Written by: Lois Weber; Marion Orth
- Produced by: Lois Weber; Phillips Smalley; David Gill; Kevin Brownlow
- Starring: Philip Hubbard; Margaret McWade; Louis Calhern; Claire Windsor; Marie Walcamp
- Cinematography: Gordon Jennings; Philip R. Du Bois
- Production company: Lois Weber Productions
- Distributed by: F.B. Warren Corporation
- Release date: September 4, 1921
- Running time: 91 minutes
- Country: United States
- Language: Silent (English intertitles)

The Blot (1921) by Lois Weber

The Blot is a 1921 American silent drama film directed by Lois Weber, who also co-wrote (with Marion Orth) and produced the film (with her then-husband, Phillips Smalley). The film tackles the social problem of genteel poverty, focusing on a struggling family. It stars Philip Hubbard, Margaret McWade, Louis Calhern, and Claire Windsor.

== Plot ==
At the end of class, poorly paid college professor Andrew Griggs begs his unruly students to show more appreciation for his efforts to teach them. Among the most disrespectful are a spoiled trio led by Phil West, whose father is the school's wealthiest trustee; Bert Gareth, a congressman's son; and Walt Lucas, a 23-year-old who must graduate to receive his inheritance.

Unbeknownst to his friends, Phil's interest has been piqued by the professor's daughter, Amelia. He frequently drops by the public library where she works, just to be able to speak to her. She, however, is unimpressed by him and his wealth.

The Griggs' poverty is contrasted with the prosperity of their next-door neighbors. "Foreign-born" shoemaker Hans Olsen is sympathetic to their plight, as is his eldest son Peter (Amelia's secret admirer), but his wife strongly dislikes what she considers Mrs. Griggs' superior airs.

One day, Phil finally manages to persuade Amelia to let him drive her home after work, as it is raining (and her shoe has a hole in it). He is invited inside. Mrs. Griggs, knowing who he is, decides to spend what little she has on some fancy sandwiches, cakes and tea in an attempt to put up a brave front. She is heartbroken to find when she brings them in that Phil has departed and poor Reverend Gates (another of Amelia's admirers) is to be the recipient of her expensive bounty. As a result, Mrs. Griggs is unable to make the mortgage payment on the house.

Juanita Claredon, another of the country club set, considers herself Phil's girl. Noting a change in the now more thoughtful and considerate man, she follows him one day to the library and sees her rival. Eventually, she realizes that his love for Amelia has matured him, and wishes him well.

When Amelia becomes sick, the doctor recommends she get some nourishing food, such as chicken. Mrs. Griggs tries unsuccessfully to buy one on credit (a scene observed by Phil). In desperation, she steals an uncooked chicken from Mrs. Olsen's open window; this is witnessed by the horrified Amelia. While Amelia does not see her mother change her mind and put it back, Mrs. Olsen and Peter do. When Mrs. Olsen threatens to make this theft known, Peter insists he will leave home if she does. Meanwhile, Phil sends anonymously a basket of food (including a chicken) to the Griggs. However, Amelia refuses to eat it, as she believes it was stolen.

The next day, though she is still ill, she goes to work, as it is payday. Afterward, she goes to apologize to Mrs. Olsen and to pay for the theft. Her teary attempt to make amends moves her neighbor, who denies she lost a chicken. The strain is too much for Amelia; she faints. Phil and Mrs. Griggs rush over and take her home. There, Phil confesses it was he who sent the chicken. Amelia is finally won over.

Phil writes his father about the inadequate salaries paid to the teachers, calling it a "blot on the present day civilization"; impressed, Philip West Sr. comes to see his altered son and agrees that something must be done. In the meantime, Phil dragoons his friends into paying the professor for extra tutoring in the evenings. During that night's session, both Peter and Gates see that Amelia has given her heart to Phil. In the final scene, the saddened reverend congratulates them and makes his way home.

== Cast ==
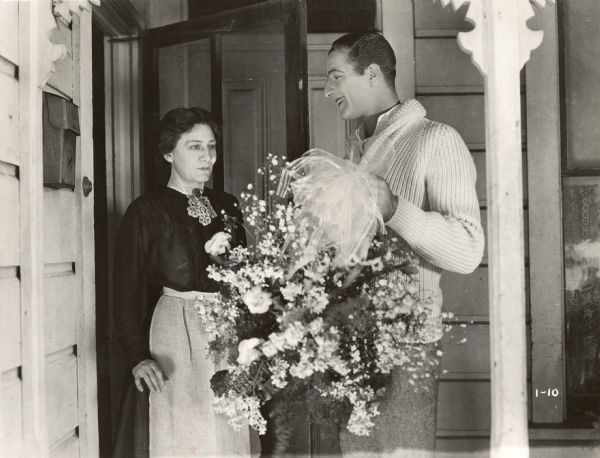
Louis Calhern and Margaret McWade in The Blot, 1921

- Philip Hubbard as The Professor, Andrew Theodore Griggs
- Margaret McWade as His Wife, Mrs. Griggs
- Claire Windsor as His Daughter, Amelia Griggs
- Louis Calhern as His Pupil, Phil West
- Marie Walcamp as The Other Girl, Juanita Claredon
- William H. O'Brien as one of the professor's students (uncredited)
- Gertrude Short as neighbor Olsen's daughter (uncredited)
- Larry Steers as dinner guest (uncredited)

== Production ==
Weber filmed in real locations, using as much natural lighting as possible. Scenes were filmed on location around Los Angeles, particularly on Vermont Avenue in East Hollywood, at the then University of California, Los Angeles, now Los Angeles City College. Many supporting roles were given to non-professionals.

== Restoration ==
The Blot was restored by Kevin Brownlow and David Gill. Beginning in the 1980s, Brownlow and Gill restored silent films for broadcast on British television, mostly for the Thames Silents series.

The Blot screened at the San Francisco Silent Film Festival in 2002.

== Reception ==
Brownlow singles out the film for praise in his book Behind the Mask of Innocence (1990).

"Kevin Brownlow says that you won’t find a better film for showing you how life was really lived in the 1920s".

== Home media ==
It was released on DVD by Milestone Films in 2006, with audio commentary by Shelley Stamp, author of Lois Weber in Early Hollywood.
