= Christian Alfonsi =

American business executive and author

- Born: Philadelphia, PA
- Education: Harvard University
- Occupations: Author; business executive
- Writing career
- Period: 2006–present
- Genre: Nonfiction
- Notable work: Circle in the Sand (2006)

Christian Alfonsi is an American business executive and author. He is the author of Circle in the Sand, a study of White House policymaking during the two Bush presidencies, and the co-founder of Cinergistik. He was CEO of Metabook, the predecessor to Cinergistik.

== Education ==
Alfonsi received a PhD in political science from Harvard University's Department of Government in 1999.

== Career ==
=== Writing ===
Alfonsi's nonfiction book, Circle in the Sand: Why We Went Back to Iraq, was published in 2006 by Doubleday; a paperback edition, retitled Circle in the Sand: The Bush Dynasty in Iraq, was published by Vintage Books in 2007. The book is an expansion of Alfonsi's PhD thesis, Improvised Crusades, which explored the Gulf War and why George H. W. Bush's administration had been successful in getting Saddam Hussein to remove his troops from Kuwait, and yet were ineffective in the aftermath.

In Circle in the Sand, Alfonsi examines the links between the two Bush presidencies and the wars in Iraq during their respective presidencies. He writes about the decision-making process that led to the Gulf War (1990–91) and its relation to the 2003 Iraq War. Alfonsi argues that the 2003 invasion of Iraq by George W. Bush's administration was a direct reaction to his father's mistake in leaving Hussein in power, and that the September 11 attacks were an indirect result of not overthrowing Hussein. He dissects how dissimilar the two Bush administrations were, both in style and strategy. In the book, Alfonsi drew on interviews with officials including President George H.W. Bush, Vice President Dick Cheney, Secretary of Defense Robert Gates, Secretary of State Lawrence Eagleburger, White House Chief of Staff John Sununu, and National Security Advisers Anthony Lake and Brent Scowcroft.

The Washington Post called the book "an eye-opener" with "plenty of juicy tidbits about the once and future Bushes," saying that it "works best as a retelling of the 1990-91 Gulf crisis with the benefit of new documents and on-the-record interviews with senior officials then and now." The statement was echoed in the Chicago Tribune, writing that it "shines as a work of history, particularly for insights into the run-up to Saddam Hussein's August 1990 invasion of Kuwait and the first Bush White House's decision to leave the Iraqi dictator in power in 1991." Kirkus Reviews stated, "Much of the story that emerges is familiar, though told in greater depth."

=== Business ===
Alfonsi was the co-founder of Metabook, a publishing company and production studio launched in 2015, and was the company's CEO. Metabook published titles by authors including John Berendt, Diane Clehane and Wally Lamb, and produced content featuring Elizabeth Banks, Laura Benanti, Laverne Cox, Dana Delany, Jeremy Sisto, Kathleen Turner and Alfred Uhry.

In 2021, the company changed its name to Cinergistik, after Facebook rebranded to Meta and acquired its name and trademarks. As Cinergistik, the company is continuing its involvement in publishing, while also focusing on film and television entertainment. Alfonsi is executive producer on Cinergistik's documentary Whitney Houston in Focus, based on Bette Marshall's book Young Whitney, published by Cinergistik in February 2022.

== Bibliography ==
- Circle in the Sand: Why We Went Back to Iraq (New York: Doubleday, 2006) ISBN 0-385-51598-7
  - Circle in the Sand: The Bush Dynasty in Iraq (New York: Vintage Books, 2007) ISBN 978-1-4000-9606-0
