= Clara Louise Burnham =

American novelist

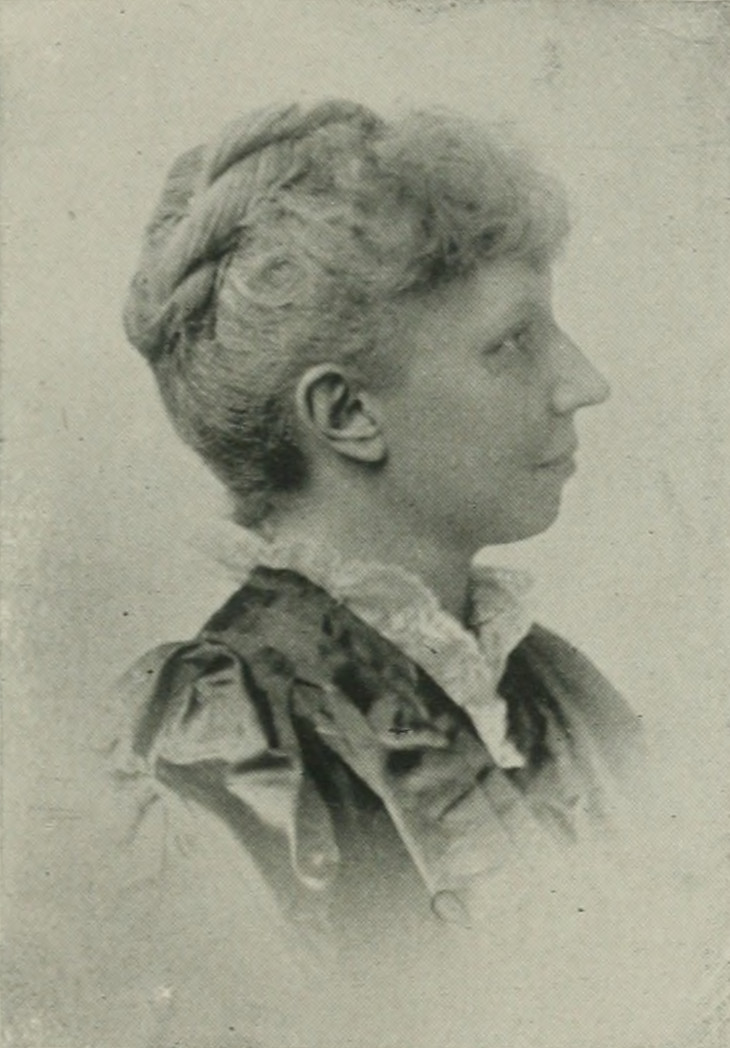
- Portrat photo in A Woman of the Century
- Born: Clara Louise Root; May 25, 1854; Newton, Massachusetts, U.S.
- Died: June 20, 1927 (aged 73); Casco Bay, Bailey Island, Maine, U.S.
- Occupation: Novelist
- Relatives: George Frederick Root (father)

Clara Louise Burnham (née, Root; May 25, 1854 – June 20, 1927) was an American novelist. After the success of No Gentlemen (1881), other books followed, including A Sane Lunatic (1882), Dearly Bought (1884), Next Door (1886), Young Maids and Old (1888), The Mistress of Beech Knoll (1890), and Miss Bagg's Secretary (1892). The daughter of George Frederick Root, she wrote the text for several his most successful cantatas. The 1923 film A Chapter in Her Life is based on Burnham's 1903 novel Jewel: A Chapter in Her Life. Born in Massachusetts, she died at the family home in Maine in 1927.

== Early life and education ==
Clara Louise Root was born in Newton, Massachusetts, May 25, 1854. She was one of six children, and the oldest daughter of Dr. George Frederick Root, the musical composer, and the former Mary Woodman. Her father, becoming the senior partner of the Chicago firm of Root & Cady, removed with his family to that city when Burnham was very young, and Chicago was her home thereafter. A return for several summers to the old homestead in North Reading, Massachusetts, together with the memory of the first years of her life, gave her an acquaintance with New England dialect and character, which she used later in her work.

Her education included music studies.

== Career ==
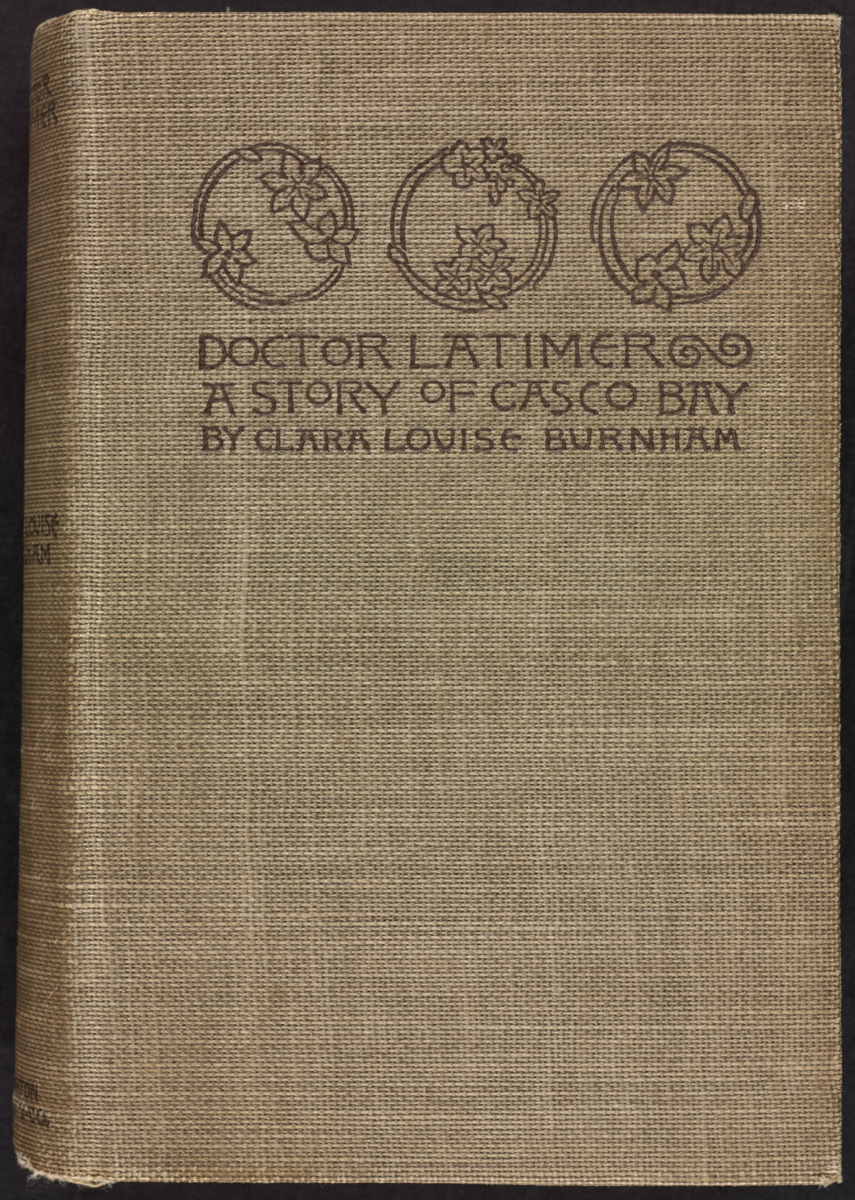
Doctor Latimer - a story of Casco Bay

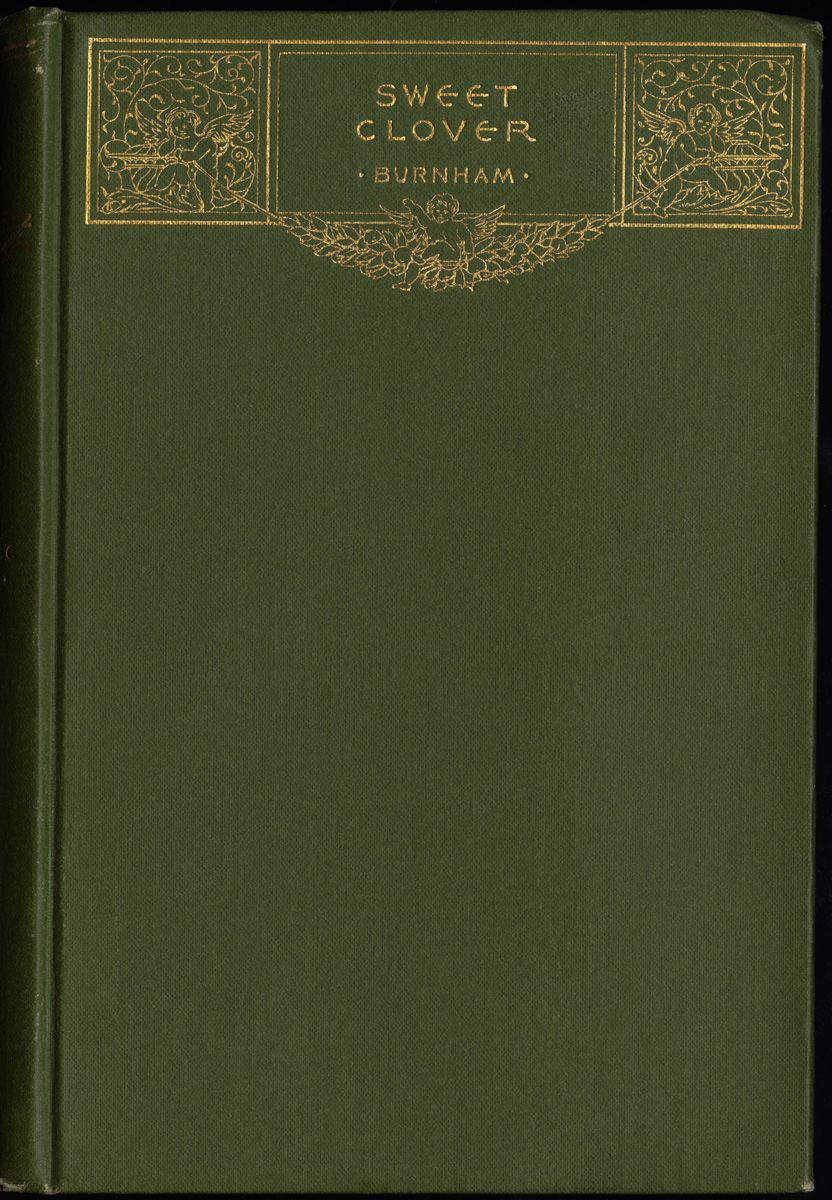
Sweet clover

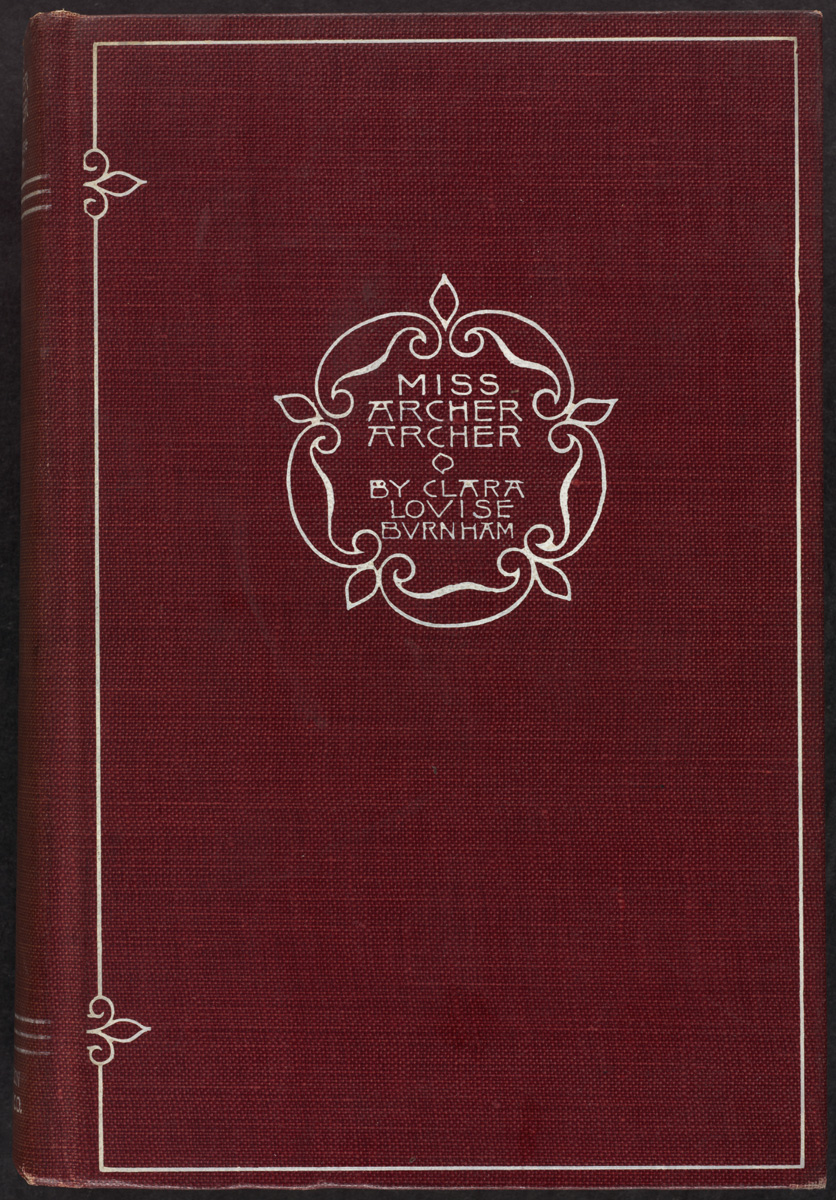
Miss Archer Archer

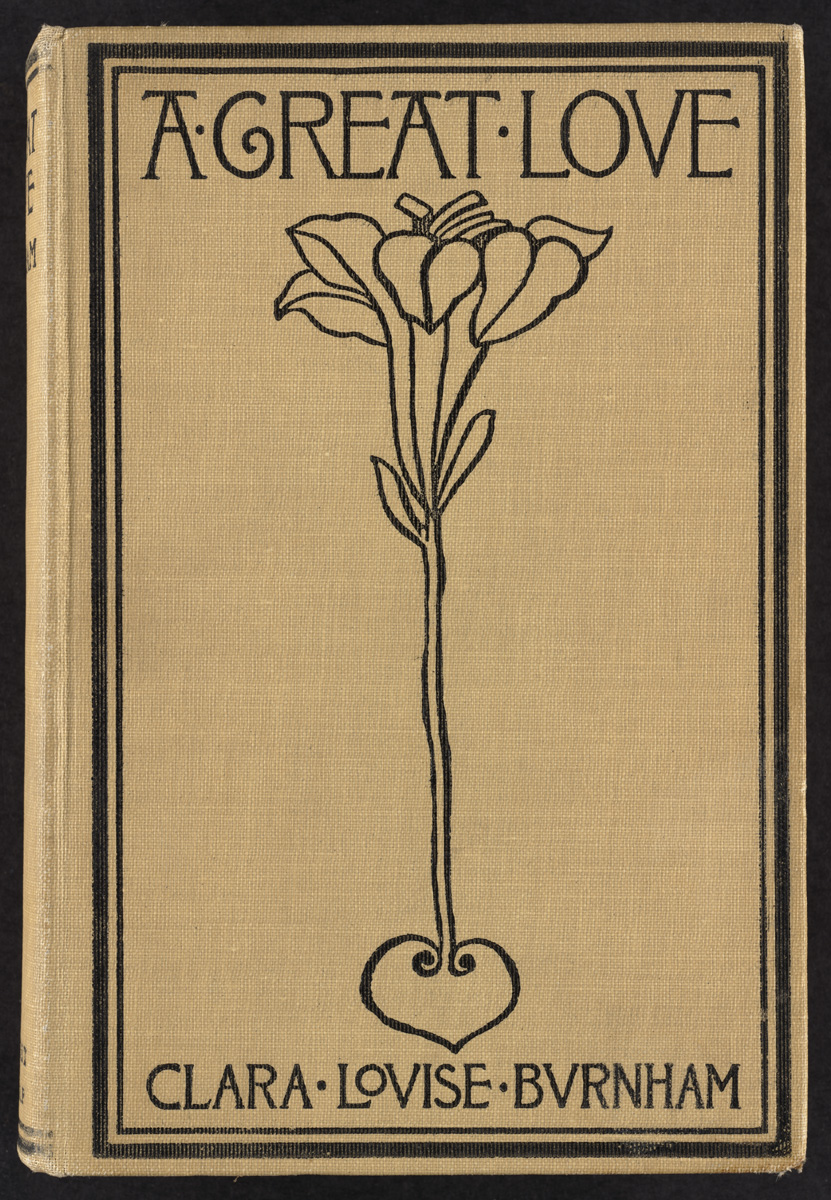
A great love

Burnham married while she was still very young. Shortly after her marriage, a brother, who enjoyed reading her letters, urged her to write a story. The brother persisted for months, and at last, in order to show him the absurdity of his request, she began writing. To Burnham's surprise, her attitude soon changed. She wrote two novelettes and paid to have them critiqued by the reader of a publishing house, keeping her identity unknown. The response was unfavorable, the reader going so far as to say that, if the author were of middle age, she would better abandon all hope of success as a writer. Burnham, not being "of middle age," was as reluctant to stop writing as she had previously been to take it up. Recalling her lifelong ability for rhyming, she wrote some poems for children, which were accepted and published by Wide Awake, and that success fixed her determination.

She wrote No Gentlemen (Chicago, 1881) and offered it to a Chicago publisher. He examined it, said it would be an unsafe first book, and advised her to go home and write another. The author's father, who until that time had not regarded her work seriously, liked No Gentlemen and believed in it. Through his interest, the book immediately found a publisher, and its success was instantaneous. Other books followed including, A Sane Lunatic (Chicago, 1882), Dearly Bought (Chicago, 1884), Next Door (Boston, 1886), Young Maids and Old (Boston, 1888), The Mistress of Beech Knoll (Boston, 1890), and Miss Bagg's Secretary (Boston, 1892). Besides her novels, Burnham wrote the text for several of Root's most successful cantatas, and contributed many poems and stories to The Youth's Companion, St. Nicholas Magazine, and Wide Awake. The 1923 film A Chapter in Her Life is based on Burnham's novel Jewel: A Chapter in Her Life.

== Personal life ==
Burnham had no children, and she resided with her father. In addition to her writing, she was a cultured pianist. In religion, she affiliated with Christian Science.

Clara Louise Burnham died at the family home at Casco Bay, Bailey Island, Maine, on June 20, 1927.

== Selected works ==
- The right princess; a play [in three acts]
- A sane lunatic, 1882
- We, Von Arldens, 1882
- Dearly bought : a novel, 1884
- The waifs' Christmas : a Christmas cantata for children, 1886 (with G. F. Root)
- Flower praise : a floral service for festive occasions such as children's day, flower Sunday, Easter, anniversaries, etc. especially adapted to the children of the Sunday school, 1886 (with G. F. Root)
- Snow-White and the seven dwarfs, a juvenile operetta in four scenes. Words by Clara Louise Burnham. Music by Geo. F. Root, 1888
- A sane lunatic, 1889
- Santa Claus and Co. A Christmas cantata for children, 1889
- The last days of George F. Root, 189?
- Miss Bagg's secretary : a West Point romance, 1892
- The mistress of Beech Knoll, a novel, 1893
- Sweet Clover : a romance of the White City, 1894
- Kate's wise woman, 1896
- S., 1896
- Miss Archer Archer, 1897
- The bundle of sticks : a Christmas cantata for children, 19-- (with G. F. Root)
- Next door, 190-
- Miss Pritchard's wedding trip : a novel, 1901
- Jewel; a chapter in her life, by Clara Louise Burnham; with illustrations by Maude and Genevieve Cowles ..., 1903
- The right princess, 1904
- The Quest Flower ... With illustrations in color by Anna Milo Upjohn, 1908
- How to keep your child from fear, 1909
- The Opened Shutters. A novel, etc., 1909
- Flutterfly, 1910
- The right princess, 191-
- Clever Betsy. A novel ... With illustrations by Rose O'Neill, 1910
- The leaven of love : a novel, 1912
- The Inner Flame : a novel, 1912
- Cupid's trap, 1912
- The Golden Dog ... Illustrated by Frank Aveline, 1913
- The right track, 1914
- The mistress of Beech Knoll : a novel, 1918
- In apple-blossom time : a fairy-tale to date, 1919
- Hearts' Haven. A novel, etc., 1919
- Dr. Latimer; a story of Casco Bay, 1921
- The queen of Farrandale : a novel, 1923
- The lavarons : a novel, 1925
- Tobey's First Case. A novel, 1926
- Young Maids and Old
- No Gentlemen
