= Maurice Pivar =

English-American film editor, producer and writer

- Born: 11 August 1894; Manchester, United Kingdom
- Died: 14 June 1982 (aged 87); Los Angeles, California, United States
- Occupation: Film editor

Maurice Pivar (11 August 1894 – 14 June 1982) was an English-born American film editor, producer and writer.

== Life and career ==
Maurice Pivar was born in Manchester, England on 11 August 1894.

He edited 21 films, oversaw editing of 59 films, produced 4 films and wrote the dialogue descript to the film The Cohens and the Kellys in Africa between years 1921 and 1936. In 1949 he resigned from his post as head of the editorial department at Universal International Studios. He was the head of the editorial department at the Columbia Studios in the 1950s; responsible over all of the editing/ editors at the studio. He died in Los Angeles of a heart attack on 14 June 1982, at the age of 87. He was married to Billie Lowell Pivar. His daughter was Lois Rich Sloman.

== Selected filmography ==
- The Hunchback of Notre Dame (1923)
- The Phantom of the Opera (1925)
- Sensation Seekers (1927)
- All Quiet on the Western Front (1930)
- Frankenstein (1931)
- Iron Man (1931)
- Storm Over the Andes (1935)
