= Motion Picture Directors Association =

The Motion Picture Directors Association (MPDA) was an American non-profit fraternal organization formed by 26 film directors on June 18, 1915, in Los Angeles, California. The organization selected a headquarters to be built there in 1921.

Its articles of incorporation stated as that the organization existed to:

1. To maintain the honor and dignity of the profession of motion picture directors;
2. To cultivate the usefulness and exert every influence to improve the moral, social and intellectual standing of all persons connected with the motion picture producing business;
3. To cultivate social intercourse among its members;
4. To aid and assist all worthy distressed members of this association, their wives, widows and orphans.

The following year MPDA members helped their fellow directors working in New York City to form their own branch association. It was officially incorporated in January 1917 with Allan Dwan elected as its first head.

Lois Weber (1879-1939) was the only woman granted membership in the Motion Picture Directors Association.

The organization lasted until 1936 when members of the MPDA helped create the Screen Directors Guild, an official craft union.

Some of the founders and early members of the MPDA were:

- William C. DeMille
- Allan Dwan
- John Ford
- Charles Giblyn
- Joe De Grasse
- Eddie Lyons
- J. Searle Dawley
- Harry L. Franklin
- George Melford
- Sidney Olcott
- William Desmond Taylor
- Maurice Tourneur
- Laurence Trimble
- Lois Weber
