= 8th Writers Guild of America Awards =

8th WGA Awards
- Date: 1956
- Organized by: Writers Guild of America, East and the Writers Guild of America, West

The 8th Writers Guild of America Awards honored the best film writers of 1955. Winners were announced in 1956

== Winners and nominees ==
=== Film ===
Winners are listed first highlighted in boldface.

| **Best Written Musical**: **Love Me or Leave Me, Screenplay by Daniel Fuchs, and Isobel Lennart; story by Daniel Fuchs**; Daddy Long Legs, Screenplay by Phoebe Ephron, and Henry Ephron; based on the novel by Jean Webster; Guys and Dolls, Screenplay by Joseph L. Mankiewicz; story by Damon Runyon and based on the play by Jo Swerling, and Abe Burrows; It's Always Fair Weather, Written by Betty Comden, and Adolph Green; Oklahoma!, Screenplay by Sonya Levien, and William Ludwig; based on the play by Richard Rodgers, and Oscar Hammerstein II | **Best Written Drama**: **Marty, Written by Paddy Chayefsky**; Bad Day at Black Rock, Screenplay by Millard Kaufman; based on a story by Howard Breslin; Blackboard Jungle, Screenplay by Richard Brooks; based on the novel by Evan Hunter; East of Eden, Screenplay by Paul Osborn; based on the novel by John Steinbeck; Picnic, Screenplay by Daniel Taradash; based on the play by William Inge |
**Best Written Comedy**: **Mister Roberts, Screenplay by Frank S. Nugent, and Joshua Logan; based on the play by Thomas Heggen, and Joshua Logan from the novel by Thomas Heggen**; Phffft, Written by George Axelrod; The Seven Year Itch, Screenplay by Billy Wilder, and George Axelroad; based on the play by George Axelroad; The Tender Trap, Screenplay by Julius J. Epstein; based on the play by Max Shulman, and Robert Paul Smith; To Catch a Thief, Screenplay by John Michael Hayes; based on the novel by David Dodge

=== Special awards ===
Laurel Award for Screenwriting Achievement

**Albert Hackett, Frances Goodrich, Julius J. Epstein, Philip G. Epstein**
