= Claire Windsor =

American actress (1892–1972)

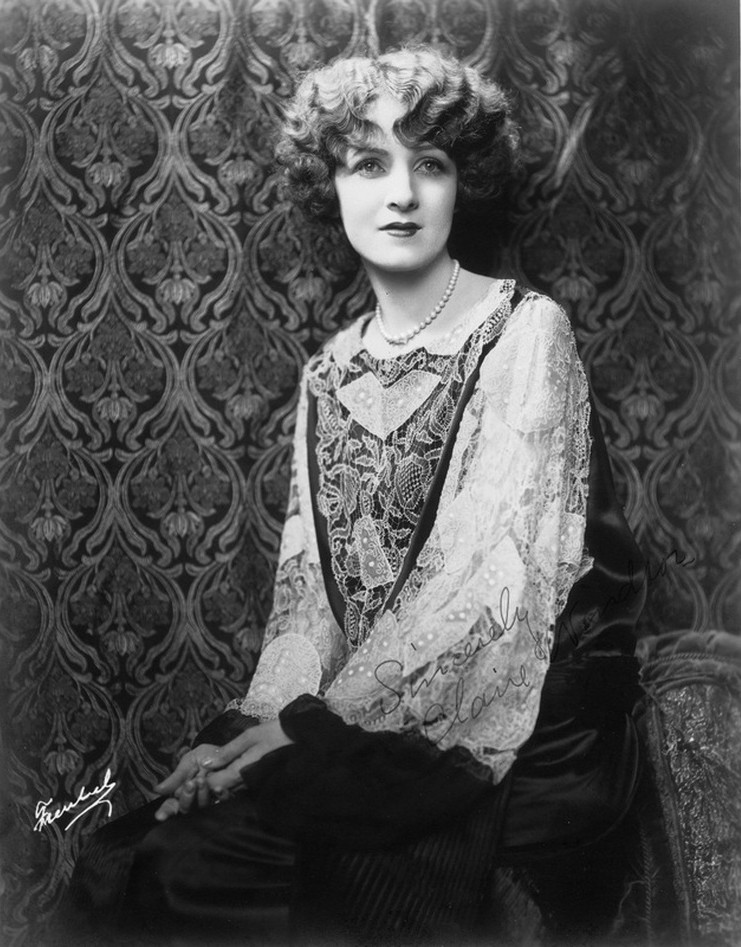
- Windsor in 1924
- Born: Clara Viola Cronk; April 14, 1892; Marvin, Kansas, U.S.
- Died: October 24, 1972 (aged 80); Los Angeles, California, U.S.
- Resting place: Forest Lawn Memorial Park, Glendale, California, U.S.
- Occupation: Actress
- Years active: 1919–1945
- Spouses: Willis Bowes (m. 1914; div. 1920) Bert Lytell (m. 1925; div. 1927)
- Children: 1

Claire Windsor (born Clara Viola Cronk; April 14, 1892 – October 24, 1972) was an American film actress of the silent screen era.

== Early life ==
Windsor was born Clara Viola Cronk (nicknamed "Ola") in 1892 in Marvin (later known as Glade), Kansas, to parents of Scandinavian descent, George Edwin Cronk and Ella Rose Fearing (later called "Rosella"), who married on October 21, 1885, in Davenport, Iowa. Their first child, a son, died shortly after birth. Her parents later moved to Cawker City, Kansas when she was two years old. At some point, Claire's sister, Nellie, was born. Claire attended Washburn Preparatory Academy in Topeka from 1906 to 1907. After a year at Broadway High School, Seattle, Washington, she returned as a student in the Fine Arts Department at Washburn College.

Intent on further refining her daughters' education and position in society, Rosella and her daughters returned to Seattle in the fall of 1910. On July 14, 1913, Claire ("Ola") was chosen for the role of Empress during the lavish musical production of Jappyland. While living in Seattle, Ola met David Willis Bowes and the intense relationship continued by correspondence after Mr. Bowes' return to Denver. Soon a June wedding was planned, but en route back to Kansas, Ola and Bowes wed secretly on May 13, 1914, in Denver, Colorado. The union resulted in the birth of a son, David Willis Bowes Jr., on September 9, 1916, but the couple soon went their separate ways. Bowes officially filed for divorce on September 14, 1920.

Ola moved to California to be reunited with her parents who had recently retired. Seeking a way to support herself and baby son, Ola took the advice of a friend and quickly found employment at the movie studios. Initially receiving only bit parts, she was soon spotted by Lois Weber, a highly regarded and influential director and producer of silent films for Paramount Pictures. Weber immediately signed Windsor to a contract.

== Career climb ==
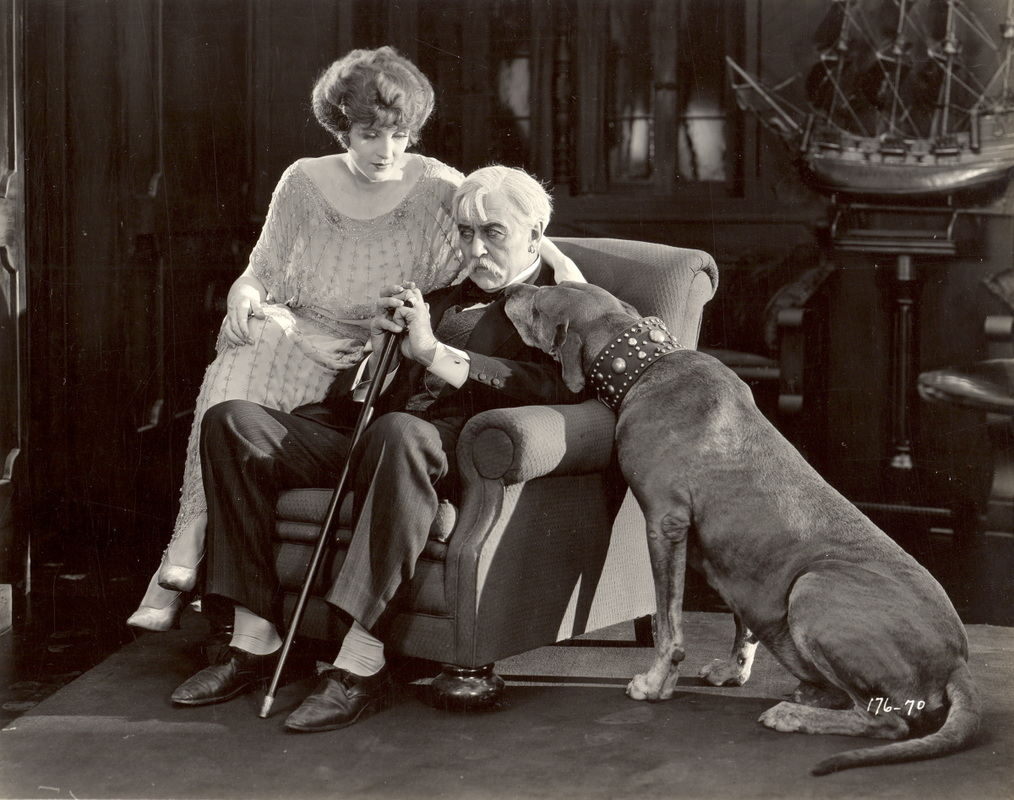
Windsor, Hobart Bosworth and Teddy the Dog in Marshall Neilan's The Strangers' Banquet (1922)

Claire Windsor's film debut was in the 1920 release of Lois Weber's To Please One Woman which was only a modest success. To promote the nascent starlet, Paramount Pictures often paired Windsor with the newly divorced actor Charlie Chaplin in publicity photographs, leading the tabloid press to give mention to the young actress in print. In 1921, Windsor costarred with Louis Calhern in Weber's The Blot (1921).

The publicity paid off; in 1922 the newly formed Western Association of Motion Picture Advertisers (WAMPAS) began their annual WAMPAS Baby Stars awards and she was named, along with Bessie Love, Lila Lee, Mary Philbin and Colleen Moore, as the year's most promising starlets. That same year Claire signed a contract with Goldwyn Pictures Corporation. She would appear in Broken Chains with fellow WAMPAS Baby Star Colleen Moore.

In 1923, the former Ola Cronk officially began using the more matinee-friendly Claire Windsor as a moniker. Throughout the 1920s, Windsor established herself as highly regarded leading lady in film. As her career progressed, she was often typecast as the "upscale society girl", often playing the part of a princess, or monied socialite. Critics lauded her elegant fashion sense, and Windsor became a noted trend-setter of 1920s fashion.

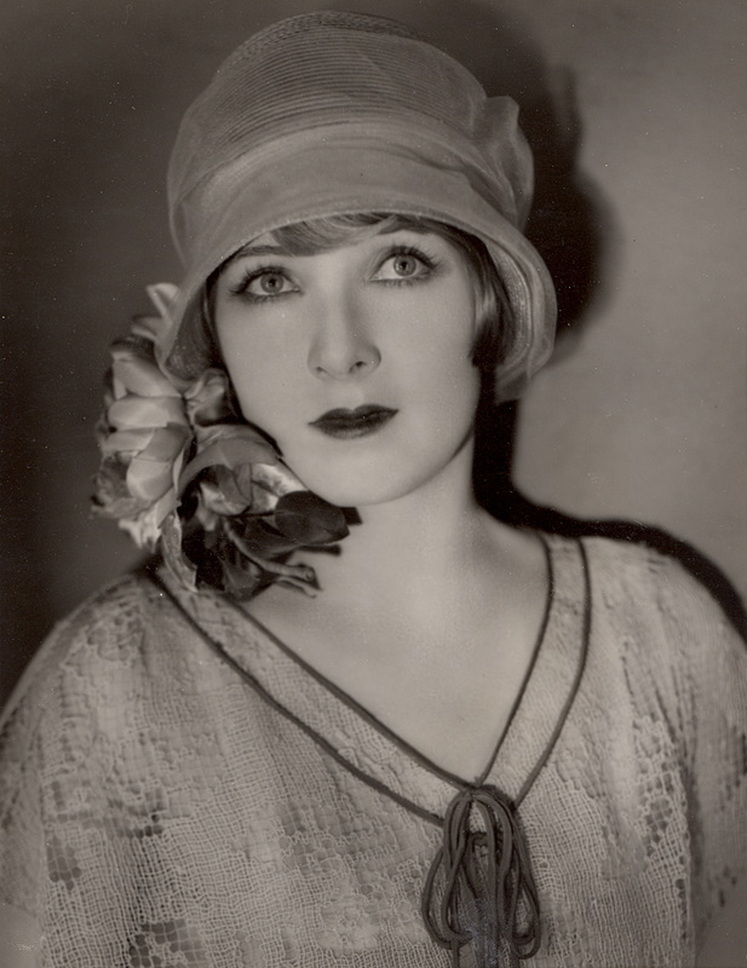
Windsor in 1926

In 1924, Windsor was one of the top stars at the newly formed Metro-Goldwyn-Mayer studio. Later, at Tiffany Pictures, Souls for Sables (1925), co-starring Eugene O'Brien, was a box-office hit for Windsor.

== Personal life and sound films ==
Windsor was frequently romantically linked to her leading male co-stars. She reportedly had a well-publicized affair with actor Charles "Buddy" Rogers. In 1925 she married matinée idol Bert Lytell. The couple divorced in 1927. Windsor never remarried, but a few notable love affairs with men caused minor scandals in the press, including once being sued by the young wife of a Boston broker in an "Alienation of Affection" lawsuit, in which the broker's wife contended that Windsor had "stolen her husband".

By the late 1920s, Windsor (like so many of her acting peers) found it difficult to move into talkies. She made several talkies throughout the 1930s but could never recapture the success of her earlier years as a silent screen actress. She had a brief stint on a road tour with Al Jolson in the production of The Wonder Bar and occasionally took stage parts. In 1937 she performed at Harold Lloyd's Beverly Hills Little Theatre for Professionals. In her later years, Windsor devoted herself to painting.

On April 12, 1943, she legally changed her name to Claire Windsor, and her son took the name of William Willis Windsor.

== Death ==
Claire Windsor died of a heart attack on October 24, 1972, at the age of 80 at Good Samaritan Hospital in Los Angeles. She was buried at Glendale's Forest Lawn Memorial Park cemetery.

For her contribution to the motion picture industry, Claire Windsor was given a star on the Hollywood Walk of Fame at 7021 Hollywood Blvd. in Hollywood, California on February 8, 1960.

== Filmography ==
Year	Films	Role	Notes
1919	Eyes of Youth	Guest at Party (uncredited)	
1920	In the Heart of a Fool	(uncredited)	Lost Film
1920	To Please One Woman	Alice Granville	Lost Film
1921	What's Worth While?	Phoebe Jay Morrison	
1921	Too Wise Wives	Marie, his wife	
1921	The Blot	His daughter, Amelia	
1921	What Do Men Want?	Hallie, The Girl	41 of 70 minutes extant
1921	Dr. Jim	Helen Keene	Lost Film
1921	The Raiders	"Honey" Moore	Lost Film
1922	Grand Larceny	Kathleen Vaughn	Lost Film
1922	One Clear Call	Faith	
1922	Fools First	Ann Whittaker	Lost Film
1922	Rich Men's Wives	Gay Davenport	Lost Film
1922	Brothers Under the Skin	Dorothy Kirtland	4 of 6 reels extant
1922	The Strangers' Banquet	Derith Keogh	Lost Film
1922	Broken Chains	Hortense Allen	
1923	Souls For Sale	Herself	
1923	The Eternal Three	Frances Walters	
1923	Little Church Around the Corner	Leila Morton	
1923	Rupert of Hentzau	Countess Helga	Lost Film
1923	The Acquittal	Madeline Ames	
1924	Nellie, The Beautiful Cloak Model	Nellie	
1924	A Son of the Sahara	Barbara Barbier	Lost Film
1924	For Sale	Eleanor Bates	Lost Film
1924	Born Rich	Chadyeane Fairfax	
1924	The Dixie Handicap	Virginia	Lost Film
1925	The Denial	Mildred	
1925	The White Desert	Robinette	
1925	Just A Woman	June Holton	Lost Film
1925	Souls for Sables	Alice Garlan	
1926	Dance Madness	May Anderson	Lost Film
1926	Money Talks	Phoebe Starling	Lost Film
1926	Tin Hats	Elsa von Bergen	6 of 7 reels extant
1927	A Little Journey	Julia Rutherford	Lost Film
1927	The Claw	Dierdre Saurin	
1927	The Bugle Call	Alice Tremayne	Lost Film
1927	Foreign Devils	Lady Patricia Rutledge	
1927	The Frontiersman	Lucy	Lost Film
1927	Blondes by Choice	Bonnie Clinton	
1927	The Opening Night	Carol Chandler	
1928	Satan and the Woman	Judith Matheny	Lost Film
1928	Nameless Men	Mary	Lost Film
1928	Fashion Madness	Gloria Vane	Lost Film
1928	The Grain of Dust	Josephine Burroughs	Lost Film
1928	Domestic Meddlers	Claire	Lost Film
1928	Show People	Herself	
1929	Captain Lash	Cora Nevins	
1929	Midstream	Helene Craig	
1932	Self Defense	Alice	
1932	Sister to Judas	Annie Frayne	
1933	The Constant Woman	Marlene Underwood	
1933	Kiss of Araby	Mrs. Courtney	
1934	Cross Streets	Ann Clement Grattan	
1938	Barefoot Boy	Valerie Hale	
1945	How Doooo You Do!!!	Herself	

== Sources ==
- 1900 United States Census for Cawker, Mitchell County, Kansas, and 1910 United States Census for Kansas for Cawker, Mitchell County, Kansas
- Massillon Evening Independent, "Actress Asks To Keep Stage Name", April 12, 1943, p. 12.
- Philadelphia Inquirer, "Claire Windsor and Husband Former Denver Residents", February 2, 1922.
