= 8th Directors Guild of America Awards =

- Date: 1956
- Country: United States
- Presented by: Directors Guild of America

Highlights
- Best Director Feature Film: Marty – Delbert Mann
- Best Director Television: The Jane Wyman Show for "The Little Guy" – Don Weis
- Website: https://www.dga.org/Awards/History/1950s/1955.aspx?value=1955

The 8th Directors Guild of America Awards, honoring the outstanding directorial achievements in film and television in 1955, were presented in 1956.

== Winners and nominees ==
=== Film ===
Feature Film

Delbert Mann – Marty

- Richard Brooks – Blackboard Jungle
- John Ford – The Long Gray Line
- Elia Kazan – East of Eden
- Henry Koster – A Man Called Peter
- Joshua Logan – Picnic
- Daniel Mann – The Rose Tattoo
- Mark Robson – The Bridges at Toko-Ri
- John Sturges – Bad Day at Black Rock
- Charles Vidor – Love Me or Leave Me
- Billy Wilder – The Seven Year Itch

=== Television ===
Television

Don Weis – The Jane Wyman Show for "The Little Guy"

- Robert Florey – Four Star Playhouse for "The Executioner"
- Roy Kellino – Four Star Playhouse for "The Collar"
- James Nielsen – General Electric Theater for "The Windmill"
- Ted Post – Medic for "Mercy Wears an Apron"
- William A. Seiter – Schlitz Playhouse of Stars for "Night of the Big Swamp"

=== D.W. Griffith Award ===
- Henry King
