= Howard Breslin =

American novelist

- Breslin, circa 1950s
- Born: 23 December 1912; New York City
- Died: 30 May 1964 (aged 51); New York City
- Education: Manhattan College
- Occupation: Novelist
- Writing career
- Pen name: Michael Niall
- Genre: historical fiction
- Notable works: The Tamarack Tree "Bad Time at Honda"

Howard Mary Breslin (23 December 1912 – 30 May 1964) was an American novelist and radio script writer. He mainly wrote novels of historical fiction and is most notable for The Tamarack Tree and "Bad Time at Honda", a short story that was the basis of the film Bad Day at Black Rock. He also published under the nom de plume Michael Niall.

== Biography ==
Howard Mary Breslin was born in New York City to Kathryn Veronica (née Connelly) and Thomas Niall Breslin, both parents of Irish descent. His father and mother met each other when they both worked at the famed Waldorf-Astoria Hotel. He was raised in Manhattan with his older brother Thomas A. Breslin and younger sister Irene Mary Breslin. Aunts and uncles often lived with the family during his childhood. Breslin lived most of his life in New York City. At the age of ten he started reading the series Rover Boys by Edward Stratemeyer and it inspired him to write.

He graduated from Regis High School in 1932, and then earned a Bachelor of Arts degree summa cum laude in 1936 from Manhattan College, in Riverdale, Bronx, New York. While at Manhattan College he was an editor for The Quadrangle, the college newspaper and editor of the yearbook.

After college Breslin applied at every newspaper in New York City, but could not get a job. He went to work as a writer for radio programs. His most notable programs included Off the Air (starring Shirley Booth) and The Honest Captain, both of which he co-wrote with Knowles Entrikin. The two alternated each week on a unique script for the show. He also wrote Mayor of the Town, starring Lionel Barrymore. Along with David Howard, Breslin wrote the show for Parker Fennelly with the character Titus Moody on Allen's Alley.

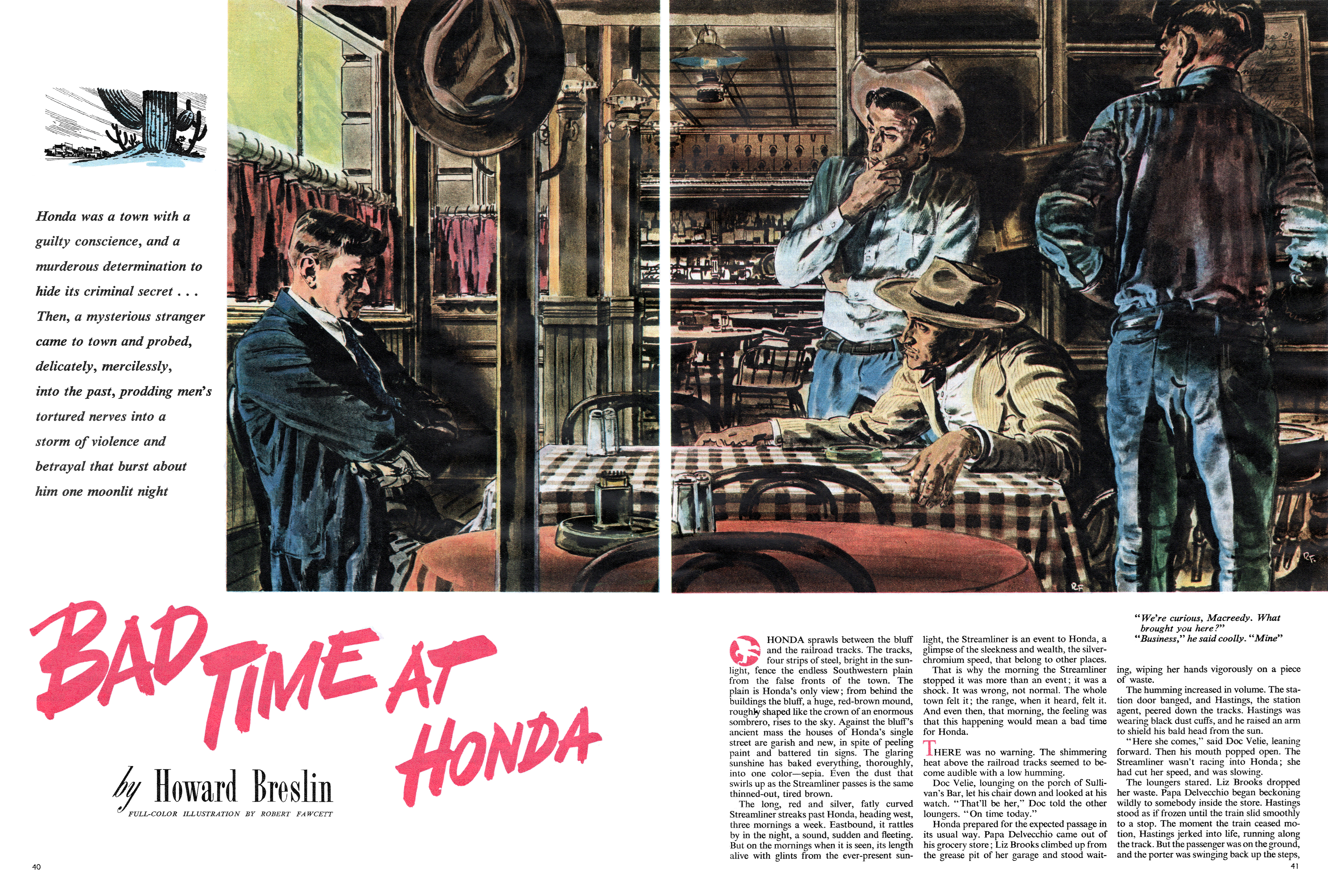
Later adapted for the 1955 film Bad Day at Black Rock, Breslin's short story "Bad Time at Honda" first appeared in The American Magazine in January 1947.

He left a lucrative job writing radio scripts, making $750 a week by 1946 (an estimated $9757.54 in 2018 dollars), to become a novelist because he was unhappy. He had published The Piper's Son but with limited success. To make ends meet he published short stories.

In 1946 he wrote the short story "Bad Time at Honda", and it appeared in The American Magazine in January 1947, with full-color illustrations by Robert Fawcett. That story became the film Bad Day at Black Rock, the script adapted by Don McGuire and Millard Kaufman, directed by John Sturges, and starring Spencer Tracy.

The Tamarack Tree (1947) set Breslin on his path as a novelist, earning him a Literary Guild and receiving critical acclaim.

He used his Irish family and childhood for his novel Let Go of Yesterday (1950) which is set in the Irish South Bronx.

Another one of his short stories was the basis for the film Platinum High School (1960; MGM), directed by Charles Haas, with the screenplay by Robert Smith, and starring Mickey Rooney.

At the end of his life he was living at 331 East 71st Street in Manhattan. Breslin died after a short illness at St. Luke's Hospital, New York City.

== Books ==
- 1945: The Piper's Son – (Springfield, OH: Crowell Publishing Company)
- 1947: The Tamarack Tree – (New York: Whittlesey House)
- 1950: Let Go of Yesterday – (New York: Whittlesey House)
- 1953: The Bright Battalions – (New York: McGraw-Hill)
- 1954: The Silver Oar – (New York: Crowell)
- 1954: Bad Day at Black Rock – (New York: Fawcett Publications)

1978 (reprint): Bad Day at Black Rock – (as "Michael Niall"; Mattituck, NY: Aeonian Press)
Novelization of the screenplay based on his original short story

- 1955: Shad Run – (New York: Crowell)
- 1956: Autumn Comes Early – (New York: Crowell)
- 1956: Thunder on the River – (Collins)
- 1958: The Gallowglass – (New York: Crowell)
- 1960: A Hundred Hills – (New York: Crowell)
- 1962: Run Like a Thief – (as "Michael Niall"; New York: M. S. Mill co. and Morrow)
- 1963: Concert Grand – (New York: Dodd, Mead)
