= Marion Orth =

American screenwriter

- Born: Marion F. Smidl; December 5, 1900; Illinois, USA
- Died: December 1, 1984 (aged 83); California, USA
- Occupation: Screenwriter
- Years active: 1918–1944
- Spouse: Edward Orth

Marion Orth (December 5, 1900 – December 1, 1984) was an American screenwriter of the silent and sound eras of Hollywood. She was a frequent collaborator of director Lois Weber.

== Biography ==
Orth began her career as a playwright and magazine writer, publishing in Breezy Stories as early as 1917. In 1920, she moved from Chicago to Los Angeles at the invitation of Lois Weber, who had purchased the film rights to two of Orth's stories, "The Price of a Good Time" (filmed in 1917) and "Borrowed Clothes" (filmed in 1918). Orth went on to write several films with and for Weber, including A Midnight Romance, To Please One Woman, Too Wise Wives, and The Blot.

In 1923, she signed a seven-picture contract at Universal as a scenarist; her efforts at the studio included work on The Price of Pleasure and Dorothy Arzner's The Wild Party. She also wrote a string of films for Fox. In 1934, she began writing for Monogram Pictures.

In 1938, she settled a lawsuit with Republic for releasing a 1937 film called Circus Girl based on her novel. Orth was awarded $10,000.

Orth's apparently final film was released in 1944.

== Selected filmography ==
- Oh, What a Night (1944)
- Sing Another Chorus (1941)
- Dr. Christian Meets the Women (1940)
- Tomboy (1940)
- Son of the Navy (1940)
- Hidden Enemy (1940)
- Under the Big Top (1938)
- Romance of the Limberlost (1938)
- Saleslady (1938)
- A Bride for Henry (1937) (adaptation)
- Paradise Isle (1937)
- Welcome Home (1935)
- Sing Sing Nights (1934)
- A Successful Failure (1934)
- Charlie Chan's Greatest Case (1933)
- Man Trouble (1930) (adaptation)
- Crazy That Way (1930)
- By Whose Hand? (1927)
- The Woman Who Did Not Care (1927)
- The Love Thrill (1927) (adaptation)
- White Gold (1927) (adaptation)
- Gigolo (1926) (adaptation)
- The People vs. Nancy Preston (1925)
- Chickie (1925)
- Single Wives (1924)
- Dark Stairways (1924)
- The Lure of Jade (1921)
- The Blot (1921)
- Too Wise Wives (1921)
- To Please One Woman (1920)
- A Midnight Romance (1919) (story)
- The Price of a Good Time (1917) (story)
