= The Magnificent Yankee (1950 film) =

1950 film by John Sturges

- Directed by: John Sturges
- Written by: Emmet Lavery (play); Francis Biddle
- Produced by: Armand Deutsch
- Starring: Louis Calhern; Ann Harding; Eduard Franz; Philip Ober
- Cinematography: Joseph Ruttenberg
- Edited by: Ferris Webster
- Music by: David Raksin
- Distributed by: Metro-Goldwyn-Mayer
- Release dates: December 20, 1950 (Los Angeles); January 18, 1950 (New York)
- Running time: 89 minutes
- Country: United States
- Language: English
- Budget: $639,000

The Magnificent Yankee is a 1950 American biographical film directed by John Sturges and starring Louis Calhern, Ann Harding, Eduard Franz and Philip Ober. Calhern had created the role of Holmes in the original Broadway production.

The screenplay was adapted by Emmet Lavery from his 1946 play of the same title, which had been adapted from the 1942 book Mr. Justice Holmes by Francis Biddle. The story examines the life of Supreme Court justice Oliver Wendell Holmes Jr.

== Plot ==
In 1902, Oliver Wendell Holmes Jr. and his wife Fanny Bowditch Holmes arrive in Washington D.C., where he is to become a justice of the Supreme Court of the United States. Justice Holmes spends his leisure time at his home, where he and his wife entertain guests. He becomes close with many of the young Harvard law clerks who work for him through the years. His most trusted friend is judge Louis Brandeis, with whom he spends hours debating the law. When Fanny dies in 1929, Holmes is heartbroken but overcomes his grief by dedicating himself to his court duties until his retirement at age 90.

== Cast ==
- Louis Calhern as Justice Oliver Wendell Holmes Jr.
- Ann Harding as Fanny Bowditch Holmes
- Philip Ober as Owen Wister
- Eduard Franz as Justice Louis Brandeis
- Ian Wolfe as Henry Adams
- Edith Evanson as Annie Gough
- Jimmy Lydon as Clinton
- Richard Anderson as Reynolds
- Herbert Anderson as Baxter
- Hayden Rorke as Graham (uncredited)
- Dan Tobin as Dixon (uncredited)

== Soundtrack ==
For his score, David Raksin incorporated the songs "The Battle Hymn of the Republic", "Auld Lang Syne" and a portion of "A Nightingale Sang in Berkeley Square". Raksin also conducted the score.

The complete score was issued on CD in 2009 by Film Score Monthly.

== Release ==
The film's international world premiere, attended by many Hollywood stars, was held at the Four Star Theatre in Los Angeles on December 20, 1950.

== Reception ==
In a contemporary review for the Los Angeles Times, critic Edwin Schallert classified the film as "one of the year's finest screen efforts" and wrote: "'The Magnificent Yankee' is definitely a picture to draw the class group. Its appeal should also be widespread among people who are willing to accept a film that is somewhat more serious than usual, while much illuminated with humor. It clearly belongs to that segment of films which better the screen hecause they have meaning and spread inspiration. Though It may lag here and there from the typical movie standpoint, it offers distinguished values to compensate and is an achievement of quality."

Critic Bosley Crowther of The New York Times called Louis Calhern's performance a "warm and appealing characterization" and wrote: "Mr. Calhern endows a literate drama with humor, inspiration and heart. ... [S]ome sentimental moments are handled so tenderly, thanks to Mr. Calhern's fine performance, that they have a richness which overcomes the heart."

While produced on a relatively modest budget, the film initially earned just $487,000 in the U.S. and Canada and $76,000 elsewhere, resulting in a loss of $471,000.

== Awards ==
The film was nominated for Academy Awards for Best Actor in a Leading Role (Louis Calhern) and Best Costume Design, Black-and-White. Calhern was also nominated for a Golden Globe Award in the category of Best Actor in a Motion Picture – Drama.

== Adaptation ==
A Hallmark Hall of Fame television production of the same title starring Alfred Lunt and Lynn Fontanne was broadcast on NBC on January 28, 1965.
