= 8th Golden Globe Awards =

Film award ceremony in 1951

- Date: February 28, 1951
- Hosted by: George Jessel

Highlights
- Best Picture: Sunset Boulevard

The 8th Golden Globe Awards, honoring the best in film for 1950 films, were held on February 28, 1951, in the Ciro's nightclub in West Hollywood, California, at 8433 Sunset Boulevard, on the Sunset Strip.

== Winners and nominees ==
Winners are listed first, highlighted in boldface.

**Best Picture**: **Sunset Boulevard**; All About Eve; Born Yesterday; Cyrano de Bergerac; Harvey	**Best Director**: **Billy Wilder – Sunset Boulevard**; George Cukor – Born Yesterday; John Huston – The Asphalt Jungle; Joseph L. Mankiewicz – All About Eve
**Best Actor in a Motion Picture – Drama**: **José Ferrer – Cyrano de Bergerac**; Louis Calhern – The Magnificent Yankee; James Stewart – Harvey	**Best Actress in a Motion Picture – Drama**: **Gloria Swanson – Sunset Boulevard**; Bette Davis – All About Eve; Judy Holliday – Born Yesterday
**Best Actor in a Motion Picture – Comedy or Musical**: **Fred Astaire – Three Little Words**; Dan Dailey – When Willie Comes Marching Home; Harold Lloyd – Mad Wednesday	**Best Actress in a Motion Picture – Comedy or Musical**: **Judy Holliday – Born Yesterday**; Spring Byington – Louisa; Betty Hutton – Annie Get Your Gun
**Best Actor in a Supporting Role**: **Edmund Gwenn – Mister 880**; George Sanders – All About Eve; Erich von Stroheim – Sunset Boulevard	**Best Actress in a Supporting Role**: **Josephine Hull – Harvey**; Judy Holliday – Adam's Rib; Thelma Ritter – All About Eve
**Best Screenplay**: **All About Eve – Joseph L. Mankiewicz**; The Asphalt Jungle – Ben Maddow and John Huston; Sunset Boulevard – Charles Brackett, Billy Wilder and D. M. Marshman Jr.	**Best Original Score**: **Sunset Boulevard – Franz Waxman**; A Life of Her Own – Bronislau Kaper; Destination Moon – Leith Stevens
**Cinematography – Black and White**: **Cyrano de Bergerac – Franz F. Planer**; The Asphalt Jungle – Harold Rosson; Sunset Boulevard – John F. Seitz	**Cinematography – Color**: **King Solomon's Mines – Robert L. Surtees**; Broken Arrow – Ernest Palmer; Samson and Delilah – George Barnes
**New Star of the Year**: **Gene Nelson – Tea for Two**; Mala Powers – Cyrano de Bergerac; Debbie Reynolds – Three Little Words	**Promoting International Understanding**: **Broken Arrow – Delmer Daves**; The Big Lift – George Seaton; The Next Voice You Hear... – William A. Wellman

=== Henrietta Awards for World Film Favorites ===
- Gregory Peck
- Jane Wyman

== Films with multiple nominations and awards ==
Films with multiple nominations
Nominations	Film
7	Sunset Boulevard
6	All About Eve
4	Cyrano de Bergerac
4	Born Yesterday
3	The Asphalt Jungle
3	Harvey
2	Three Little Words
2	Broken Arrow

Films with multiple wins
Wins	Film
4	Sunset Boulevard
2	Cyrano de Bergerac
