= Blackboard Jungle =

1955 social commentary drama film directed by Richard Brooks

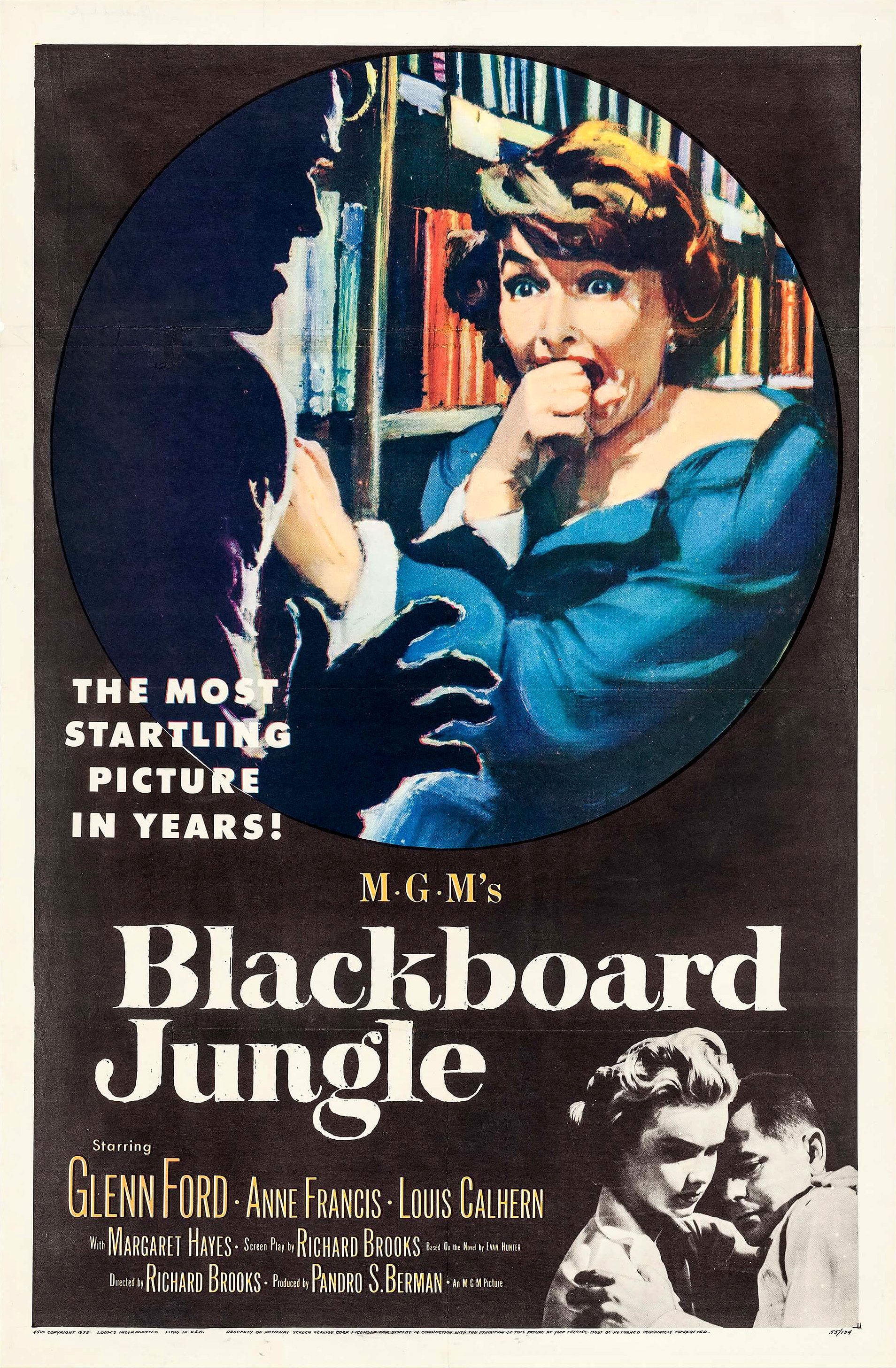
- Theatrical release poster
- Directed by: Richard Brooks
- Screenplay by: Richard Brooks
- Based on: The Blackboard Jungle; 1954 novel by Evan Hunter
- Produced by: Pandro S. Berman
- Starring: Glenn Ford; Anne Francis; Louis Calhern; Margaret Hayes
- Cinematography: Russell Harlan
- Edited by: Ferris Webster
- Music by: Charles Wolcott
- Production company: Metro-Goldwyn-Mayer
- Distributed by: Loew's Inc.
- Release dates: March 19, 1955 (New York City); March 25, 1955 (US)
- Running time: 101 minutes
- Country: United States
- Language: English
- Budget: $1,168,000
- Box office: $8,144,000

Blackboard Jungle is a 1955 American social drama film about an English teacher in an interracial inner-city school, based on the 1954 novel The Blackboard Jungle by Evan Hunter, and adapted for the screen and directed by Richard Brooks. It is remembered for its innovative use of rock and roll in its soundtrack, for casting adults as high-school teens, and for the breakout role of black cast member Sidney Poitier, as rebellious yet musically talented student Gregory Miller.

Upon release in March 1955, Blackboard Jungle provoked significant controversy for its depiction of violence and juvenile delinquency in urban public schools, sparking riots in some theaters, widespread denunciation from educators and civic groups, and banning or censorship in certain cities and countries. The film's use of "Rock Around the Clock" by Bill Haley & His Comets marked the first instance of a major Hollywood film featuring rock and roll music; it is also credited for introducing rock and roll to mainstream America.

Blackboard Jungle has since been recognized as a landmark film of the era, and an important influence on the emerging youth culture of the 1950s. In 2016, it was selected for preservation in the United States National Film Registry by the Library of Congress as being "culturally, historically, or aesthetically significant".

== Plot ==
In the mid-1950s, Richard Dadier is a new teacher at North Manual Trades High School, an inner-city school of diverse ethnic backgrounds. Led by student Gregory Miller, most engage in anti-social behavior. The school principal, Mr. Warneke, denies there are discipline issues, but the school faculty, particularly Mr. Murdock, warn Dadier otherwise. Dadier befriends two other new teachers, Joshua Edwards and Lois Hammond.

Dadier's class includes Miller and Artie West, a rebellious bully and gang leader. The class shows no respect for Dadier. Dadier encourages Miller to lead the class in the right direction. After Dadier subdues a student who attacks Miss Hammond, the class gives Dadier the silent treatment and are even more uncooperative. Dadier and Edwards are mugged by West's gang.

Reluctant to quit, Dadier seeks advice from his former teacher, Professor A.R. Kraal, the principal of an academically superior school with disciplined students. Kraal offers Dadier a job, but he declines. After chastising his class for calling each other racially divisive names, Dadier is himself falsely accused by Mr. Warneke of using racial epithets in the classroom. West encounters Dadier during his gang's robbery of a newspaper truck. West tells Dadier his classroom is on the streets and to leave him alone. Several students, led by West, assault Edwards in his classroom and destroy his music record collection.

Dadier's wife, Anne, who is pregnant, begins receiving anonymous letters and phone calls telling her Dadier and Miss Hammond are having an affair. Dadier discovers Miller can play piano and sing, and wonders why Miller can show such talent but also be so rebellious. Dadier shows his class an animated film about "Jack and the Beanstalk" which sparks discussion about moral choices. Anne goes into premature labor caused by the stress of the phone calls about Dadier's alleged affair. When his neighbor Lucy Brophy shows Dadier the anonymous letters, he angrily decides to quit. Mr. Murdock encourages him to stay, telling Dadier he is making progress and has inspired him too. Anne apologizes for doubting Dadier's fidelity and says she was wrong for telling him to quit. Their premature baby boy, though weak, eventually thrives.

When Dadier observes West openly copying from another student, he demands that West bring his paper to the front to have it docked five points. West rebuffs his repeated request, but Dadier is unrelenting. The conflict quickly escalates, and West pulls out a switchblade. Dadier does not back down. Miller stops West's sidekick and classmate Belazi from jumping Dadier from behind. The rest of West's gang fails to assist.

Dadier accuses West of the false allegations made to both Mr. Warneke and Anne. Dadier subdues West, and the other students join in to subdue Belazi, who has picked up the knife to escape. Miller then leads the class in helping Dadier take West and Belazi to the principal's office. In the final scene, Miller and Dadier ask if the other is quitting at the end of the school year. Miller says no, because the two of them had a pact that neither would quit if the other stayed. Dadier's expression makes clear he has no intention of breaking the agreement.

== Cast ==
- Glenn Ford as Richard Dadier
- Anne Francis as Anne Dadier
- Louis Calhern as Jim Murdock
- Margaret Hayes as Lois Judby Hammond
- John Hoyt as Mr. Warneke
- Richard Kiley as Joshua Y. Edwards
- Emile Meyer as Mr. Halloran
- Basil Ruysdael as Professor A.R. Kraal
- Warner Anderson as Dr. Bradley
- Sidney Poitier as Gregory W. Miller
- Vic Morrow as Artie West
- Dan Terranova as Belazi
- Rafael Campos as Pete V. Morales
- Paul Mazursky as Emmanuel Stoker
- Horace McMahon as Detective
- Jamie Farr as Santini (credited as Jameel Farah)
- Danny Dennis as De Lica
- Martha Wentworth as Lucy Brophy

Cast notes:

- This was the debut film for Campos, Morrow, and Farr, and one of Poitier's earliest. Farah later changed his name to Jamie Farr, best known for playing Corporal Maxwell Q. Klinger in the M*A*S*H TV series.

== Production ==
=== Background ===
Evan Hunter's novel was based on his early job as a teacher at Bronx Vocational High School, now known as Alfred E. Smith Career and Technical Education High School in the South Bronx. Hunter, then known as Salvatore Lombino, took the teaching job in 1950 after graduating from Hunter College. He was quickly disillusioned and quit in frustration after two months. Hunter's story was initially read at MGM studios as a galley proof before the studio purchased the story on April 15, 1954, six months before the novel's publication in October 1954. The story was also published in October 1954 in condensed form in the Ladies' Home Journal. Richard Brooks' screenplay was completed before the novel's publication.

=== Casting ===
Vic Morrow, Sidney Poitier, Rafael Campos, Dan Terranova and Paul Mazursky were all given screen tests. Morrow beat out both John Cassavetes and Steve McQueen for the role of Artie West. Morrow said in a 1971 interview that people still associated him with the role: "Everywhere I go I hear someone say 'I loved you in Blackboard Jungle'... I've done Combat and films. But people still think of me as the tough kid from the Bronx." For the role of Gregory Miller, Richard Brooks and Pandro S. Berman stated that Sidney Poitier was their first and only choice for the role, with Brooks adding; "It was a happy choice, Sidney has given us a performance even beyond our expectations." Brooks later recalled that he was informed of Poitier's age, 27, after he was already cast, but decided to cast him anyway, feeling that the role of Miller required an experienced performer. Rafael Campos, who had been acting in his native Dominican Republic since the age of 8, recalled being cast as Pete Morales: "I was in New York in 1954 and they tested 600 for the part. I got it and MGM sent me to Hollywood." For the rest of the students, Brooks hired 40 kids, took them to a parking lot near a soundstage and sat them in cars for four hours; "They did whatever they wanted to do. I needed to see their personalities. Then we began to cast. In the first week I had to know who was what. I wanted to rehearse but we had no time."

William Holden was announced in August 1954 as a possibility for the role of Richard Dadier, after reading the script. Glenn Ford was eventually selected for the role, and production on the movie began immediately after his completion of filming on Interrupted Melody.

=== Filming ===
Filming took place between November 15, 1954 and December 24, 1954, and was completed on a 29 day schedule, which producer Pandro S. Berman called "even then a remarkable feat for (the film's) quality." Glenn Ford noted that the tight filming schedule, and acting inexperience of many of the students worked in the film's favor, and gave a reality to the scenes. Ford recalled that they didn't know how to "hit a mark", or take cues, and that "after the first take, they'd deteriorate quickly, I had to adjust and speak above their lines."

=== Music ===
The song "Rock Around the Clock" by Bill Haley & His Comets was included in the film, making the recording an anthem for rebellious 1950s youth. Frank Zappa recalled his reaction to seeing the movie in theatre: "I didn't care if Bill Haley was white or sincere... he was playing the Teen-Age National Anthem and it was so LOUD I was jumping up and down." Zappa further noted that despite the authority figures winning in the end, the film "represented a strange sort of "endorsement" of the teen-age cause: "They have made a movie about us, therefore, we exist..." Arnold Shaw noted the irony of the connection between rebellion and the song: ""Rock" was simply a song about having a good time... But its role in Blackboard Jungle elevated it into the "Marseillaise" of the rock revolution. An unintended link was established between rock 'n' roll and teenage alienation and hostility." It was number 1 on the US Billboard pop charts for two months and went to number 3 on the R&B chart.

In 2010, Turner Classic Movies (TCM) listed the soundtrack of the movie on its list of the Top 15 Most Influential Movie Soundtracks of all time. TCM described the impact and the influence of the movie:

MGM brought Hollywood into the rock'n'roll era with Blackboard Jungle. In search of the kind of music teens like the film's potential delinquents were listening to, director Richard Brooks borrowed a few records from star Glenn Ford's son Peter. When he heard Bill Haley and His Comets perform 'Rock Around the Clock', he found the perfect theme song -- the first rock song ever used in a Hollywood feature. Teens flocked to the film, dancing in theatre aisles as the song played over the opening credits. Parents may have been shocked by such uninhibited behavior, but things got worse when screenings also inspired violence and vandalism around the world. Thanks to Blackboard Jungle, the song hit number one on the Billboard charts, eventually selling 25 million copies and becoming what Dick Clark called 'The National Anthem of Rock 'n' Roll'.

The film also briefly features a recording of "Jazz Me Blues" by Bix Beiderbecke and His Gang, heard in the classroom scene when teacher Joshua Edwards plays records from his jazz collection, which the students subsequently destroy.

== Release ==
=== Theatrical ===
Blackboard Jungle had a sneak preview at the Encino Theater in San Fernando Valley on February 2, 1955, before receiving its world premiere at Loew's State Theatre in New York City on March 19, 1955. Young audience members got up and danced in the aisles during the preview at the Encino Theater, which caused concern with MGM moguls Louis B. Mayer and Nicholas Schenck according to director Richard Brooks: "They walked out of the preview, shaking their heads. After that, they kept reminding me that MGM did not make dirty pictures. They kept asking, "Why do you want to cause this trouble?"

=== Home media ===
The film was released on VHS on December 5, 1989 by MGM/UA Home Video. It was released on DVD in North America on May 10, 2005, by Warner Home Video.

== Reception ==
=== Critical reception ===
Film showings at the time produced violent audience reactions where many theaters had to call in the police to keep order.

In a positive review, Bosley Crowther of The New York Times wrote:

As a straight melodrama of juvenile violence this is a vivid and hair-raising film. Except for some incidental romance, involving the teacher and his wife and a little business about the latter having a baby, it is as hard and penetrating as a nail.

— Bosley Crowther (1955)

Variety called it: "...a film with a melodramatic impact that hits hard at a contemporary problem. The casting, too, is exceptionally good." Harrison's Reports called the film: "...a stark, powerful melodrama, sordid, tense, and disturbing. The picture no doubt will stir up considerable controversy, but at the same time it probably will prove to be a top box-office grosser."

John McCarten of The New Yorker wrote:

While the film has a good many faults (the acting at times is a bit shaky and the conclusion is rather unbelievable), it nevertheless confronts its subject matter head on, and in the circumstances it is an unsettling piece of work.

— John McCarten (1955)

Dale Stevens of Dayton Daily News called it both a "sensational movie" and "an exceptional action film," noting there was a "constant stream of outstanding scenes which keep the suspense and tension alive through 100 minutes." He noted the "good performances" of the veteran cast, calling Ford "excellent," but observed that "the real guts of the picture stems from the performances of those in the roles of the students," giving especial praise to Sidney Poitier and Vic Morrow. Mildred Martin of The Philadelphia Inquirer complimented the film for being "Almost documentary in presentation, unglamorized by color or CinemaScope, directed with bare-knuckled drive by Richard Brooks." Martin notes that Glenn Ford "gives the performance of his career", and that along with Ford "acting honors go to Sidney Poitier and Vic Morrow... whose performances are almost too real for comfort." She also praised the films soundtrack; "Charles Wolcott has put together a fitting, frightening score which throbs with rock-and-roll rhythms and the beat of drums."

Not all reviews were positive. Richard L. Coe of The Washington Post slammed the film as "so sensationalized as to negate any laudable purpose its supporters claim", further explaining:

Yes, the papers regularly have news about shocking conditions in the schools. Vandalism certainly is more rampant than it was only a few years ago. Sex crimes and thuggery do occur. Even murder is not beyond our young. But to pile these things and more into a few months within one classroom surely does not show 'courage' on the part of the moviemakers. This approach simply is one more dodge at making a box office buck to anyone with his eyes open. This is the Dead End kids, the gangster melodrama, in another setting.

— Richard Coe (1955)

The Monthly Film Bulletin delivered a mixed to negative assessment:

Contrived situations and some rather thin characterisation reduce the impact and effectiveness of Blackboard Jungle, both as an exposé of a current American educational problem and a plea for more strenuous efforts by teachers at similar institutions. Characters such as the flirtatious woman teacher and the pregnant wife are fictitious trimmings which only emphasise the artificiality in the handling of the main theme. There are several tense and hard-hitting sequences, and a general atmosphere of strident earnestness, but only in the tiny part of the trade school headmaster, played with considerable force by John Hoyt, is there any real suggestion of complexity or depth.

— Monthly Film Bulletin (October 1955)

=== Box office ===
According to MGM records, the film earned $5,292,000 in the US and Canada and $2,852,000 elsewhere.

== Awards and nominations ==
| Award | Category | Nominee(s) | Result | Ref. |
|---|---|---|---|---|
| Academy Awards | Best Screenplay | Richard Brooks | Nominated | |
| Academy Awards | Best Art Direction – Black-and-White | Art Direction: Cedric Gibbons and Randall Duell; Set Decoration: Edwin B. Willis and Henry Grace | Nominated | |
| Academy Awards | Best Cinematography – Black-and-White | Russell Harlan | Nominated | |
| Academy Awards | Best Film Editing | Ferris Webster | Nominated | |
| Directors Guild of America Awards | Outstanding Directorial Achievement in Motion Pictures | Richard Brooks | Nominated | |
| National Film Preservation Board | National Film Registry | | Inducted | |
| Writers Guild of America Awards | Best Written American Drama | Richard Brooks | Nominated | |

== Controversies ==
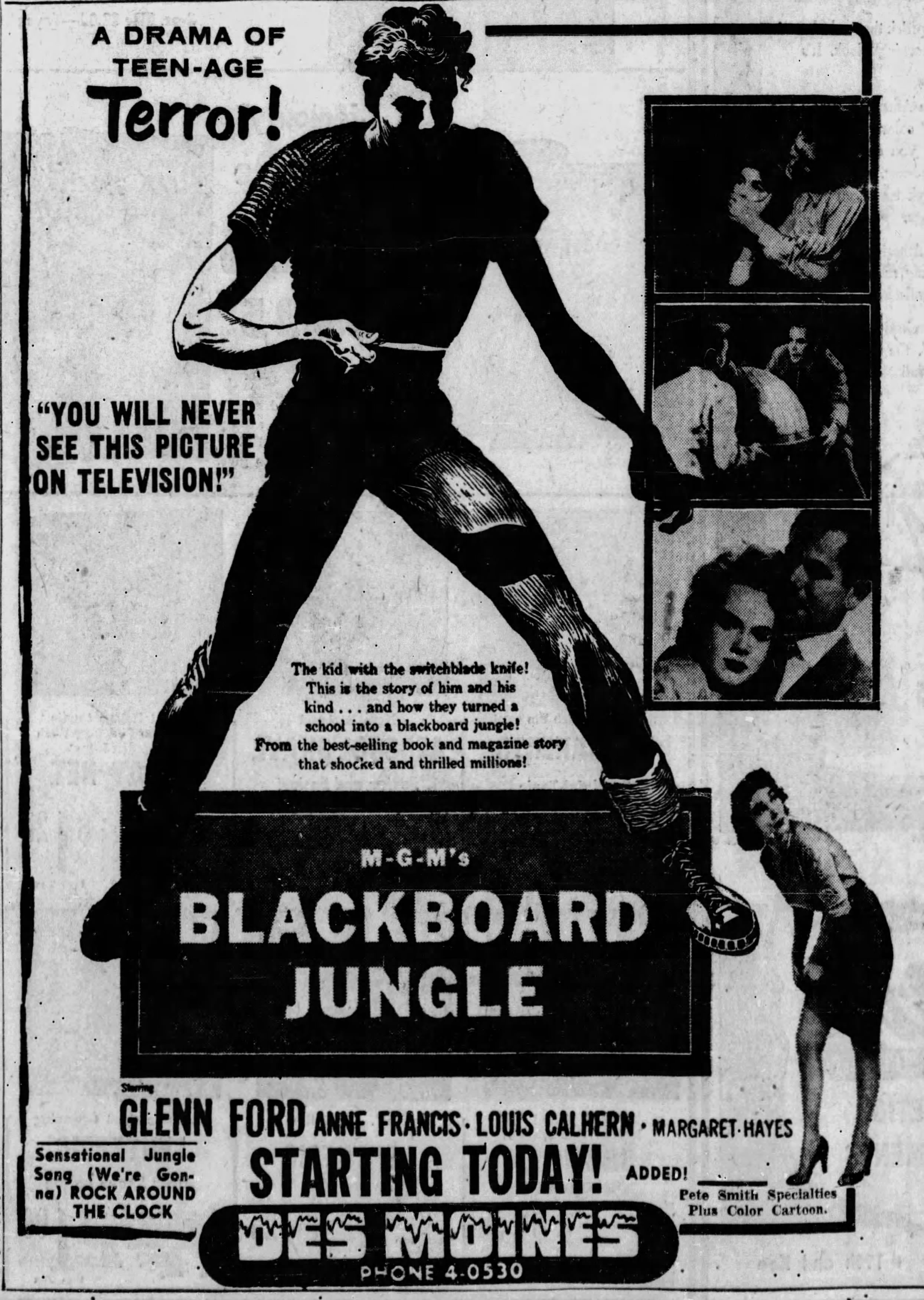
Theatrical advertisement from 1955

MGM had intended for the film to be promoted as a “portrait of democracy at work”, however advertisements for the film sensationally marketed it as a "Drama of Teen-age Terror," which resulted in large crowds attending screenings due to the controversy. The music led to a large teenage audience for the film, and their exuberant response to it sometimes overflowed into violence and vandalism at screenings. In this sense, the film has been seen as marking the start of a period of visible teenage rebellion in the latter half of the 20th century. The film was banned in Memphis, Tennessee by the Memphis and Shelby County Board of Censors, but was later approved and released for "adults only" showing. The film was also banned in Atlanta, Georgia on March 26, 1955, with the Atlanta Review Board claiming that it was "immoral, obscene, licentious and will adversely affect the peace, health, morals and good order of the city", the ban was later lifted and the film released in July 1955 The film was blamed for inspiring a gang of girls, aged 12 to 14, in Memphis who burnt down a cattle barn, later stating that they "wanted to be tough like those kids in that picture." It was also blamed by authorities for a spree of "juvenile outbreaks" in Upstate New York, and for gang fights which broke out in theaters and drive-ins where the movie played.

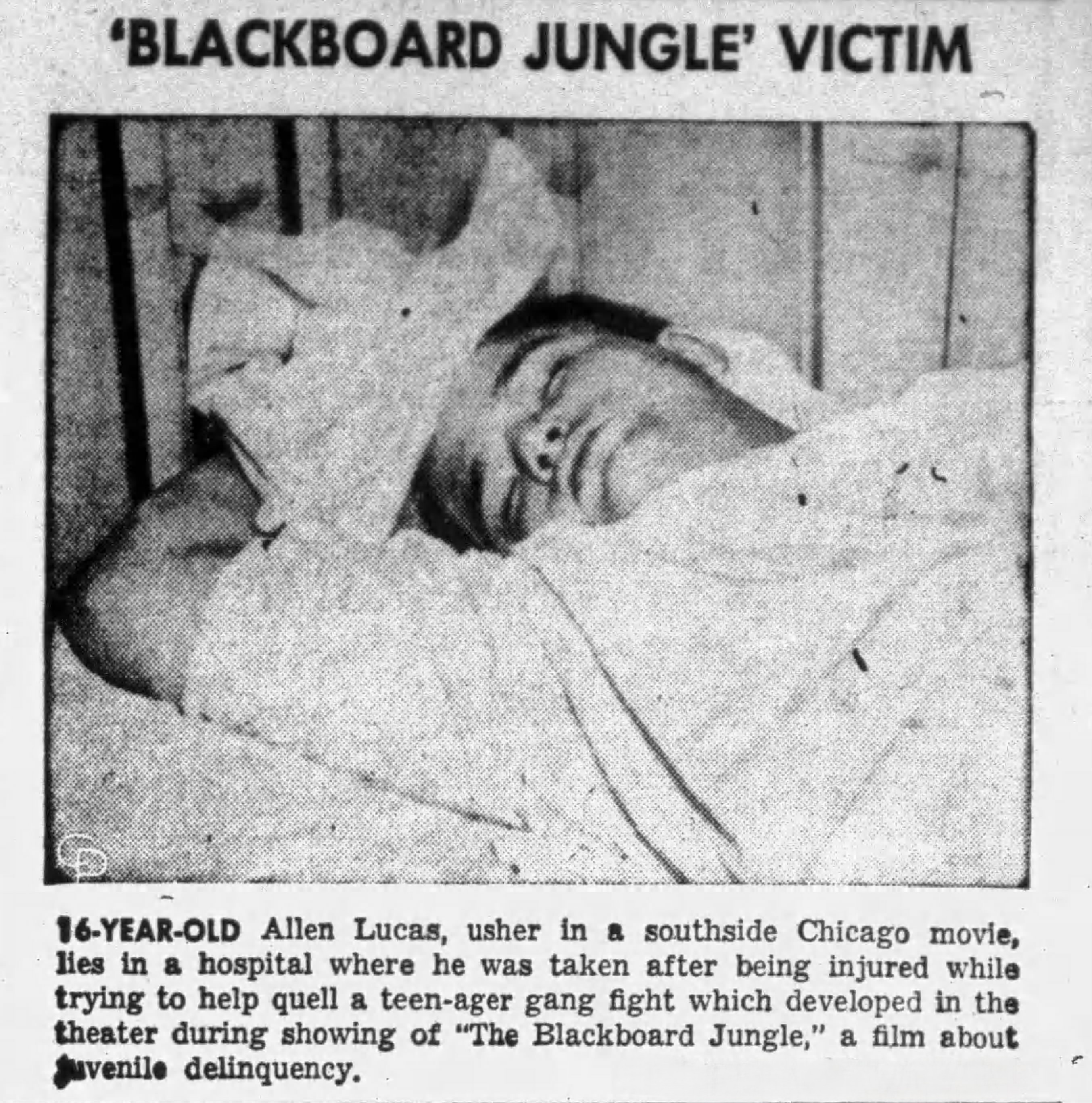
Newspaper clipping from 1955

In Canada, a group of mothers in Toronto attempted to ban the movie by protesting to alderman William Dennison, who in turn appealed to the Ontario Film Review Board to ban the movie in Ontario. One of the mothers declared: "There is definitely no moral lesson in the movie," while Dennison claimed that the film was "too disgusting a spectacle to put before the youth of Ontario." The film ultimately was not banned in Ontario or anywhere else in Canada. The censor board in India banned the movie outright for being "too violent" and "unsuitable for public exhibition", it was similarly banned in 15 other countries.

Blackboard Jungle was withdrawn from the 16th Venice International Film Festival at the insistence of then U.S. Ambassador to Italy, Clare Boothe Luce, who according to a member of the U.S. Delegation, "felt it presented an untrue view of American life and gave a bad idea of America." MGM substituted the film with Interrupted Melody. Both films were originally offered to the festival by MGM according to festival president Ottavio Croze, who selected Blackboard Jungle "for technical reasons," stating that: "I thought it was an excellent film and I am sorry to see it withdrawn."

In the United Kingdom, the film was originally refused a cinema certificate before being passed with heavy cuts, and eventually released in September 1955 with an X-rating. When shown at a south London cinema in Elephant and Castle in 1956 the teenage Teddy Boy audience began to riot, tearing up seats and dancing in the aisles. After that, riots took place around the country wherever the film was shown. The film was initially banned outright in Australia by the Australian Commonwealth Film Censor, however after MGM appealed the decision, and removed 165 feet of objectionable footage from the film, it was approved for screening as "suitable for adults only." According to Peter Ford, gossip columnist Hedda Hopper wouldn't talk to his father Glenn Ford for years after the film; "She would call him a communist, and say "Glenn, how could you make this kind of film?"

== Cultural impact ==
"I remember going to see Blackboard Jungle. When the titles flashed up there on the screen Bill Haley and his Comets started blurching "One Two Three O'Clock, Four O'Clock Rock...." It was the loudest rock sound kids had ever heard at that time. I remember being inspired with awe." – Frank Zappa, writing for Life (1968)

Blackboard Jungle is cited together with The Wild One and Rebel Without a Cause as one of the most influential films for the newly emerging 1950s youth culture. The film marked the rock and roll revolution by featuring Bill Haley & His Comets' "Rock Around the Clock", initially a B-side, over the film's opening credits (with a lengthy drum solo introduction, unlike the originally released single), as well as in the first scene, in an instrumental version in the middle of the film, and at the close of the movie, establishing that song as an instant hit. The record had been released the previous year, gaining only limited sales. But, popularized by its use in the film, "Rock Around the Clock" reached number one on the Billboard charts and remained there for eight weeks. In some theaters, when the film was in the first release, the song was not heard at all at the beginning of the film because rock and roll was considered a bad influence. Despite this, other instances of the song were not cut.

In the book, The Films of the Fifties: The American State of Mind, author Andrew Dowdy describes a crucial scene in which the students destroy Joshua Edwards (Richard Kiley)'s collection of rare swing records; "They destroy his version of American popular culture, while the soundtrack blares their own competing music: rock and roll."

Ted Mahar, writing for The Oregonian notes the change of teenagers from the mid-1950s, instigated by Blackboard Jungle and Rebel Without a Cause:

Before, high schoolers were epitomized by Andy Hardy, Archie Andrews, Betty, Veronica, and Henry Aldrich, kids whose biggest worries involved proms, football, homework and doings at the soda fountain. From 1955 on, high school problems were the kind that make teens lives miserable, as films became dramas about scarring emotional and social problems, not light comedies.

The 1982 crime action thriller film Class of 1984 serves as a loose remake of The Blackboard Jungle, with Perry King, Timothy Van Patten and Michael J. Fox in the roles of Glenn Ford, Vic Morrow and Sidney Poitier, respectively.

In 2007, the Journal of Criminal Justice and Popular Culture published an article that analyzed the film's connection to crime theories and juvenile delinquency. In 2015, the Journal of Transnational American Studies published a study with a focus on the film's reception in West Germany and Japan.

The influential Jamaican reggae album Blackboard Jungle Dub (1973) by The Upsetters references the film's title.

The film touches on the still-current issue of teacher pay. The dialog states that in 1955, the pay for teachers was US$2.00 an hour (equivalent to $24 in 2025), or about US$4,000 a year salary (equivalent to $48,075 in 2025), as compared with congressmen and judges at US$9.25 (equivalent to $111 in 2025), policemen and firemen at US$2.75 (equivalent to $33 in 2025), carpenters at US$2.81 (equivalent to $34 in 2025), plumbers at US$2.97 (equivalent to $36 in 2025), and plasterers at US$3.21 an hour (equivalent to $39 in 2025).

In March 2005, the 50th anniversary of the release of the film, which had influenced the subsequent upsurge in the general popularity of rock and roll, was marked by a series of "Rock Is Fifty" celebrations in Los Angeles and New York City, involving the surviving members of the original Bill Haley & His Comets.

In 2016, the film was selected for preservation in the United States National Film Registry by the Library of Congress.

Rotten Tomatoes, on their best of Sidney Poitier list says:

This was the role that put Poitier on the map. The struggles of educators and students are well documented in this violent and controversial film, based on Evan Hunter's seminal novel about inner-city school conditions. Modern audiences might struggle to sympathize with the tactics employed by Poitier's character, Gregory Miller, but the cultural impact his performance had on both society and education are undeniable.

== See also ==
- List of American films of 1955
- List of cult films
- In the 1967 film To Sir, with Love and its 1996 sequel, Sidney Poitier plays a teacher in a difficult school.
- List of hood films
- Dangerous Minds
- The Principal

== Bibliography ==
- Ford, Peter. "Rock Around the Clock and Me".
