= Convicts 4 =

1962 film

- Directed by: Millard Kaufman
- Screenplay by: Millard Kaufman
- Based on: Reprieve; the Testament of John Resko; 1959 Autobiography by John Resko
- Produced by: A. Ronald Lubin
- Starring: Ben Gazzara; Stuart Whitman; Vincent Price; Rod Steiger; Sammy Davis, Jr. Ray Walston
- Cinematography: Joseph F. Biroc
- Edited by: George White
- Music by: Leonard Rosenman
- Distributed by: Allied Artists Pictures Corporation
- Release date: September 15, 1962
- Running time: 105 minutes
- Country: United States
- Language: English

Convicts 4, also known as Reprieve, is a 1962 American neo noir crime film starring Ben Gazzara and directed by Millard Kaufman. The film is a fictionalized version of the life of death row convict John Resko, who wrote his autobiography: Reprieve.

The film was initially released as Reprieve to "poor box office," and was released again as Convicts 4, also without commercial success.

== Plot ==
It is Christmas, 1931, and John Resko wants to give his baby daughter a new teddy bear. He goes, without money, into a shop and tries to get the shopkeeper to give it to him saying he will pay him later. The prosperous shopkeeper, who cleans his eyeglasses with a dollar bill, refuses. Resko grabs a gun he saw in the till and points it at the man. The shopkeeper lunges at Resko and is shot. Resko is condemned to the electric chair at the age of eighteen.

Pardoned by the governor at the last minute, Resko is sentenced to life imprisonment, and he has difficulty adjusting to life behind bars. It becomes even less bearable after hearing that his wife has left him and that his father has died while rescuing a drowning child to make up for the life that was lost.

Resko attempts to escape twice, and does long stretches in solitary confinement. But he is befriended eventually by fellow convicts like Iggy and Wino who help him to pass the time. When he takes up art as a hobby, Resko's work is seen by an art critic, Carl Carmer, who believes him to have promise.

In 1949, after 18 years in prison, Resko is released. His daughter and granddaughter are waiting when he gets out.

== Cast ==
- Ben Gazzara as John Resko
- Stuart Whitman as Principal Keeper
- Ray Walston as Iggy
- Vincent Price as Carl Carmer
- Rod Steiger as Tiptoes
- Broderick Crawford as Warden
- Dodie Stevens as Resko's Sister
- Jack Kruschen as Resko's Father
- Sammy Davis Jr. as Wino
- Naomi Stevens as Resko's Mother
- Carmen Phillips as Connie Resko
- Susan Silo as Cathy (as an adult)
- Timothy Carey as Nick
- Roland La Starza as Duke
- Tom Gilson as Lefty
- Arthur Malet as Storekeeper
- Jack Albertson as Art teacher

== Factual background ==
On February 5, 1931, Resko and an accomplice, Frank Mayo, killed a grocer, Samuel Friedberg, during an attempted robbery of his store at 885 East 167th Street in the Bronx. Resko confessed to the crime. Both men were sentenced to death, and the jury recommended clemency for Resko, who was 19 and had a wife and infant daughter. The jury recommended clemency, with the foreman saying that he was a tool "in the hands of a hardened criminal." Resko's sentence was commuted by then-Governor Franklin D. Roosevelt to life imprisonment after he testified against Mayo, who was executed on July 21, 1932.

Resko became a noted artist while in prison and was freed shortly before Christmas 1949 by Governor Thomas E. Dewey. The film mixes fact with fiction, turning the killing into a crime of passion.

== Production ==
Resko was technical advisor of the film, whose prison sequences were filmed at Folsom State Prison. Sammy Davis Jr. put on a show for the actual inmates after filming.

== Critical reception and legacy ==
New York Times critic A.H. Weiler said the film "is forthright and serious in its attempt to limn a striking figure but is only rarely compelling or memorable."

The New York Daily News gave the film three of four stars, and called the film "commendable" even though it failed to substantiate its premise that becoming a good artist means that one is a "rehabilitated soul." The convicts are sympathetically portrayed as "sympathetic at heart and good for occasional laughs."

Although the film did not find an audience in the theaters, it was played often on late-night television, and is included in the 2008 anthology, 101 Forgotten Films.

== See also ==
- List of American films of 1962
