= To Please One Woman =

1920 film by Lois Weber

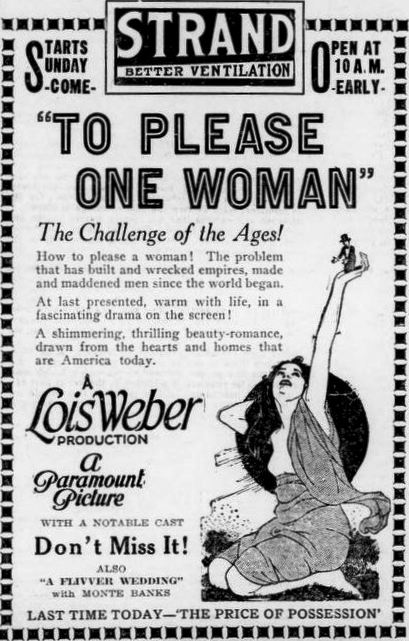
- Newspaper advertisement
- Directed by: Lois Weber
- Written by: Marion Orth (story); Lois Weber
- Produced by: Lois Weber
- Starring: Claire Windsor; George Hackathorne; Edmund Burns
- Distributed by: Famous Players–Lasky; Paramount Pictures
- Release date: December 19, 1920
- Running time: 70 minutes
- Country: United States
- Language: Silent (English intertitles)

To Please One Woman is a lost 1920 American silent drama film produced and directed by Lois Weber and starring Claire Windsor. It was distributed by Famous Players–Lasky and Paramount Pictures.

== Plot ==
The film is a take on the "vamp" genre by pioneer Lois Weber, just as that genre was waning.

== Cast ==
- Claire Windsor as Alice Granville
- Edith Kessler as Cecilia Granville
- George Hackathorne as Freddy
- Edmund Burns as Dr. John Ransome
- Mona Lisa as Leila
- Howard Gaye as Leila's Husband
- Lee Shumway as Lucien Wainwright (credited as L.C. Shumway)
- Gordon Griffith as Bobby Granville

uncredited

- Frank Coghlan Jr. as (credited as Junior Coghlan)
- Esther Ralston

== Preservation status ==
With no holdings located in archives, To Please One Woman is considered a lost film. In February 2021, the film was cited by the National Film Preservation Board on their Lost U.S. Silent Feature Films list.
