= Midstream (film) =

1929 science fiction film

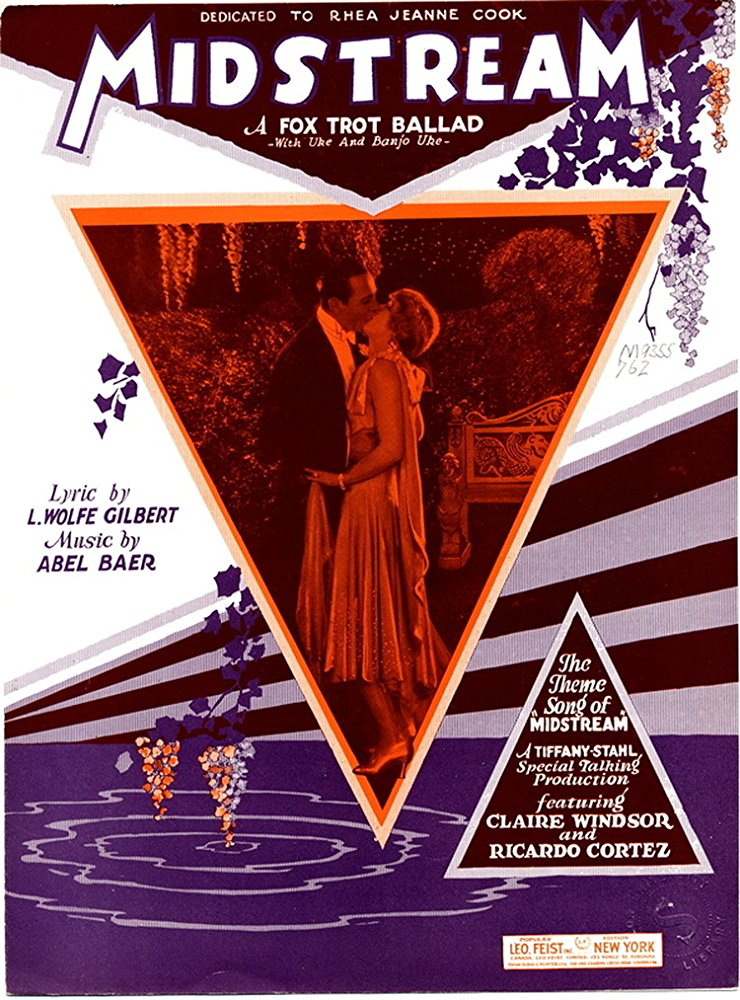
- Directed by: James Flood
- Written by: Fanny Hatton; Frederic Hatton; Bernice Boone; Frances Guihan
- Produced by: John M. Stahl
- Starring: Ricardo Cortez; Claire Windsor; Montagu Love
- Cinematography: Jackson Rose
- Edited by: Desmond O'Brien
- Music by: Hugo Riesenfeld
- Production company: Tiffany Pictures
- Distributed by: Tiffany Pictures
- Release date: July 29, 1929
- Running time: 70 minutes
- Country: United States
- Languages: Sound (Part-Talkie); English intertitles

Midstream is a 1929 American sound part-talkie science fiction film directed by James Flood and starring Ricardo Cortez, Claire Windsor, and Montagu Love. In addition to sequences with audible dialogue or talking sequences, the film features a synchronized musical score and sound effects along with English intertitles. The soundtrack was recorded using the Tiffany-Tone sound-on-film system using RCA Photophone equipment.

== Plot ==
As described in a film magazine, Jim Blackstone, a Wall Street operator who has seen youth and romance pass him by while he has been accumulating wealth, falls in love with his next door neighbor, Helen Craig. To win her over, he travels abroad where he submits to a rejuvenation operation. Emerging as a young man, he cables home of his own death, and then reappears in New York as his own nephew James Stanwood who has inherited everything. The new young-old boy wins the young woman away from a young man of her own age. On the eve of their marriage, they attend a performance of the opera Faust. Helene's comments regarding the performance, where Faust makes a deal with the devil Mephistopheles to become young again, cause the financier to break down, the resulting shock causing him to age into an old man. The young woman takes a run-out on learning that her youthful lover is really a man old enough to be her father. He finally decides to marry his private secretary, who had served him faithfully for a score of years.

== Cast ==
- Ricardo Cortez as Jim Blackstone / James Stanwood
- Claire Windsor as Helene Craig
- Montagu Love as Dr. Nelson
- Larry Kent as Martin Baker
- Helen Jerome Eddy as Mary Mason
- Leslie Brigham as Mephistopheles
- Genevieve Schrader as Marguerite
- Louis Alvarez as Faust
- Florence Foyer as Marthe
- Margarete Kupfer in a bit part

== Music ==
The film features a theme song entitled "Midstream" with lyrics by L. Wolfe Gilbert and music by Abel Baer.

== Preservation ==
According to the American Silent Feature Film Database, a complete copy of the film exists at the Cinémathèque française.

One reel of the film, featuring a ten-minute performance from Act I of the opera Faust, was included as an extra on the 2 DVD set of The Phantom of the Opera (1925), released by the Milestone Collection. A contemporary review stated that the entire opera section of the film was about twenty minutes long.

== See also ==
- List of incomplete or partially lost films
- List of early sound feature films (1926–1929)

== Bibliography ==
- Pitts, Michael R. Poverty Row Studios, 1929–1940: An Illustrated History of 55 Independent Film Companies, with a Filmography for Each. McFarland & Company, 2005.
