= Too Wise Wives =

1921 film

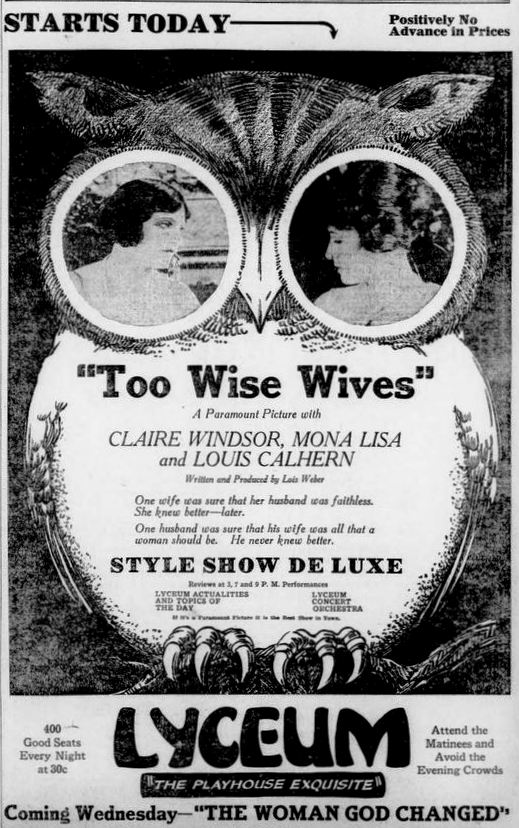
- Newspaper ad
- Directed by: Lois Weber
- Screenplay by: Lois Weber; Marion Orth
- Produced by: Lois Weber
- Starring: Louis Calhern; Claire Windsor; Phillips Smalley; Mona Lisa
- Cinematography: William C. Foster
- Production company: Lois Weber Productions
- Distributed by: Paramount Pictures
- Release date: May 22, 1921
- Running time: 80 minutes
- Country: United States
- Language: Silent (English intertitles)

Too Wise Wives is a 1921 American silent drama film directed by Lois Weber, written by Lois Weber and Marion Orth, and starring Louis Calhern, Claire Windsor, Phillips Smalley, and Mona Lisa. It was released on May 22, 1921, by Paramount Pictures. A copy of the film is in the Library of Congress.

== Plot ==
Too Wise Wives (1921)

As described in a film magazine, David Graham is the husband of Marie, a wife whose great love leads her to too careful safeguarding of her husband's happiness. Sara Daily, a former sweetheart, is the wife of John Daily, a wealthy man whose love she retains by methods more subtle than sincere. Sara attempts to regain the adulation of David, but Marie intercepts her letter of invitation, precipitating a dramatic situation that does not develop into disaster only because Marie does not open the letter. As a result of the exposure of intentions, both wives are taught a new and better understanding of family obligations with an ending happy for all concerned.

== Cast ==
- Louis Calhern as Mr. David Graham
- Claire Windsor as Marie, Mrs. David Graham
- Phillips Smalley as Mr. John Daly
- Mona Lisa as Sara, Mrs. John Daly
