= Cross Streets =

1934 American melodrama film directed by [rank R. Strayer

- DVD cover for film
- Directed by: Frank R. Strayer
- Written by: Gordon Morris; Anthony Coldeway
- Produced by: George R. Batcheller
- Starring: Claire Windsor; Johnny Mack Brown; Anita Louise
- Cinematography: M. A. Anderson
- Production company: Invincible Pictures
- Distributed by: Chesterfield Motion Pictures
- Release date: January 22, 1934 (US)
- Running time: 67 minutes
- Country: United States
- Language: English

Cross Streets is a 1934 American melodrama film directed by Frank R. Strayer, which stars Claire Windsor, Johnny Mack Brown, and Anita Louise. The screenplay was written by Gordon Morris and Anthony Coldeway, was produced by Invincible Pictures and was released by Chesterfield Motion Pictures on January 22, 1934.

== Plot ==
When he is spurned by his fiancé, Ann Clement, at his college graduation, young doctor Adam Blythe begins drinking heavily. Ann marries the wealthy Jerry Grattan. Adam conducts surgery while under the influence, and loses his patient. Disgraced, he becomes a small-town veterinarian, unable to practice medicine.

After seventeen years, Adam runs into an old schoolmate, Morton Talbot, who although he flunked out of college, is now quite wealthy. Hearing Adam's story, he empathizes with his old friend, and begins to formulate a plan. He convinces Adam to accompany him to the upcoming graduation ceremonies at their old college, Clifton University. When they arrive, Morton hints of the possibility of his making a large bequest to the school of medicine to Dean Todd, the head of the college. It was Todd who had flunked Morton, causing him to leave school. Morton introduces Adam, claiming that he is an eminent surgeon with a flourishing practice in Europe.

Meanwhile, Adam meets June Grattan, the 17-year-old daughter of Ann and Jerry. When an opportunity comes up, Morton pushes Todd to allow Adam to perform a very delicate piece of surgery. At first, Adam does not want to, but allows himself to be convinced to perform the surgery, which he does flawlessly. Impressed, Dean Todd offers Adam the position as head of the new research wing of the medical school, which is to be built with funds donated by Morton. June is equally impressed, and she and Adam fall in love. When her parents find out about their blossoming relationship, Ann is consumed by jealousy, which in turn fuels Jerry's jealousy. He approaches Adam and threatens to tell June that Adam is her father, unless Adam leaves her alone.

At a banquet that evening, however, Adam is consumed by guilt over the deception he and Morton have perpetrated. In front of the entire audience, he lets them all know the truth about his history. Everyone is in a state of shock, but June lets him know that it doesn't change her feelings for him. Adam, seeing the hopelessness of their relationship, convinces June that he is not the man for her, and that she should return to her fiancé. After she leaves, Ann arrives prepared to let him know she still has feelings for him. Jerry, blind with jealousy, has followed Ann, and when he sees her with Adam, takes out a gun and fires at her. Adam jumps in front of the bullet. As he lays dying, he asks Jerry for the gun, which he wipes clean of fingerprints. Then, just before his death, he tells Ann and Jerry to say that he committed suicide.

Morton dedicates the new research center to Adam's memory.

== Cast ==
- Claire Windsor as Ann Clement Grattan
- Johnny Mack Brown as Adam Blythe
- Anita Louise as June Grattan
- Kenneth Thomson as Morton Talbot
- Matty Kemp as Kenneth Barclay
- Josef Swickard as Dean Todd
- Niles Welch as Jerry Grattan
- Tommy Bupp as Jimmy

== Production ==
The film opened on January 22, 1934.
