= Bad Day at Black Rock =

1955 film

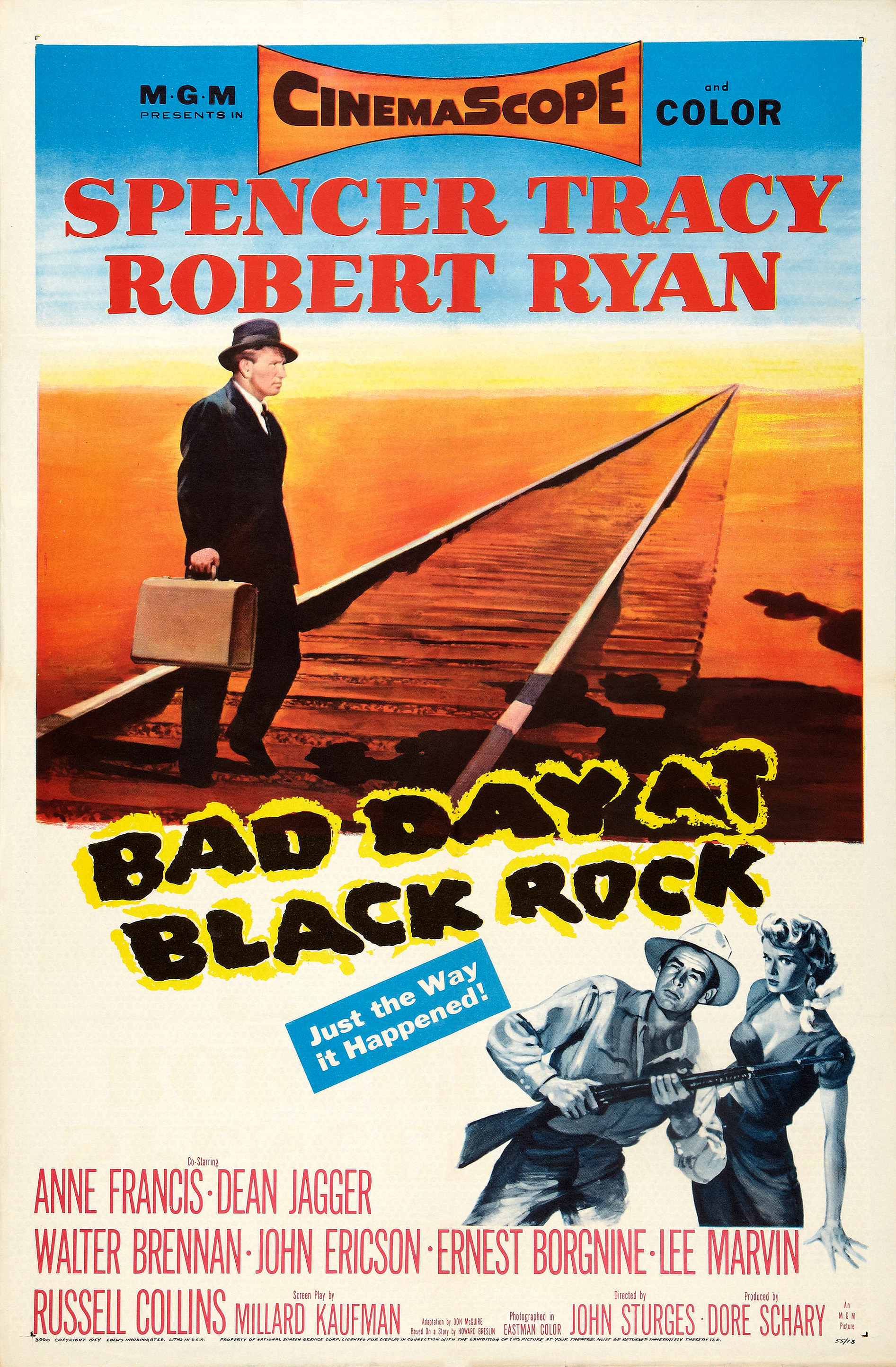
- Theatrical release poster
- Directed by: John Sturges
- Screenplay by: Millard Kaufman; Don McGuire (adaptation)
- Based on: "Bad Time at Honda"; 1947 short story in The American Magazine by Howard Breslin
- Produced by: Dore Schary
- Starring: Spencer Tracy; Robert Ryan; Anne Francis; Dean Jagger; Walter Brennan; John Ericson; Ernest Borgnine; Lee Marvin
- Cinematography: William C. Mellor
- Edited by: Newell P. Kimlin
- Music by: André Previn
- Distributed by: Metro-Goldwyn-Mayer
- Release date: January 7, 1955 (United States)
- Running time: 81 minutes
- Country: United States
- Language: English
- Budget: $1,288,000
- Box office: $3,788,000

Bad Day at Black Rock is a 1955 American neo-Western film directed by John Sturges with screenplay by Millard Kaufman. It stars Spencer Tracy and Robert Ryan with support from Anne Francis, Dean Jagger, Walter Brennan, John Ericson, Ernest Borgnine and Lee Marvin. The film is a crime drama set in 1945 that contains elements of the revisionist Western genre. A one-armed stranger (Tracy) comes to a small desert town and uncovers an evil secret that has corrupted the community.

The film was based on a short story called "Bad Time at Honda" by Howard Breslin, published by The American Magazine in January 1947. Filming began in July 1954 and the movie went on national release in January 1955. It was a box office success, and was nominated for three Academy Awards in 1956. In 2018, it was selected for preservation in the United States National Film Registry by the Library of Congress.

== Plot ==
In late 1945, one-armed John Macreedy gets off a train at Black Rock, an isolated California desert hamlet. The residents are suspicious, as this is the first time in four years that the express train has stopped at the flag stop station. After Macreedy inquires about a man named Komoko, several local men become hostile. Hastings, the telegraph agent, tells him there are no taxis; the hotel desk clerk, Pete Wirth, claims he has no vacant rooms; and Hector David threatens him. Later, Reno Smith, a powerful local rancher, informs Macreedy that Komoko, a Japanese-American, was interned during World War II.

The alcoholic sheriff, Tim Horn, is no help locating Komoko. Doc Velie, the veterinarian and undertaker, advises Macreedy to leave town immediately, but lets slip that Komoko is dead. Liz Wirth, Pete's sister, rents a Jeep to Macreedy. Driving to nearby Adobe Flat, Macreedy finds a homestead burned to the ground and wildflowers growing in the field. On the drive back, Coley Trimble tries to run Macreedy off the road. Macreedy tries to leave town, but Liz refuses to rent him the Jeep again, having been confronted by Smith.

Asked by Smith about his missing left arm, Macreedy says he lost it fighting in Italy. Macreedy suggests that the wildflowers at the Komoko place indicate a body is buried there. Smith reveals that he is virulently anti-Japanese; he tried to enlist in the Marine Corps the day after the attack on Pearl Harbor but failed the Marines' physical examination.

Macreedy tries to telephone the state police, but Pete refuses to connect the call. Doc Velie admits that something terrible happened four years ago, but Smith has everyone too terrified to speak openly about it. Velie offers his hearse to Macreedy to leave town, but Hector disables it. Writing a telegram to the California police to summon help, Macreedy gives it to Hastings.

At the diner, Trimble provokes a fight with Macreedy. Despite having only one arm, Macreedy thoroughly beats Trimble using martial arts. Confronting Smith, Macreedy accuses him of killing Komoko with the complicity of others. Hastings arrives and tries to give Smith a piece of paper; snatching the paper, Macreedy finds his unsent telegram. Informing Hastings he has broken the law, Macreedy and Velie demand that Horn take action. Horn attempts to arrest Hastings, but Smith pulls the sheriff's badge off Horn's shirt and pins it on Hector, who casually tears up the telegram.

After Smith and Hector leave, Macreedy declares that the loss of his arm had left him wallowing in self-pity, but Trimble's attempt to kill him has reinvigorated him. Komoko's son died in combat saving his life, and Macreedy has come to give Komoko his son's medal. He learned that Smith leased farmland to Komoko that Smith was sure had no water, but Komoko dug a well and found water.

After Pearl Harbor, when Smith was rejected for military service, he and the other men began drinking and decided to harass the Japanese Komoko. Komoko barricaded himself inside his home, which the men set on fire. When Komoko emerged ablaze, Smith shot and killed him.

Under the cover of darkness, Doc and Pete enlist Liz to help Macreedy escape. Outside the hotel, Pete and Doc lure away Hector and knock him unconscious. Liz drives Macreedy out of town, but stops at Adobe Flat, setting up Macreedy. Smith shoots at Macreedy, who shelters behind the Jeep. Liz rushes to Smith despite Macreedy's warning. Telling Liz that she and the rest of his accomplices must die, Smith shoots her in the back as she flees.

Finding a bottle, Macreedy fills it with gasoline from the Jeep and makes a Molotov cocktail. When Smith moves around the rocks for a better shot, Macreedy throws the Molotov cocktail at Smith, setting Smith on fire. Back in town, Macreedy arrives with Smith and the body of Liz. The state police are called and arrests are made. As Macreedy leaves, Velie requests Komoko's medal to help Black Rock heal from the terrible events. Macreedy gives it to him before boarding the train.

== Cast ==
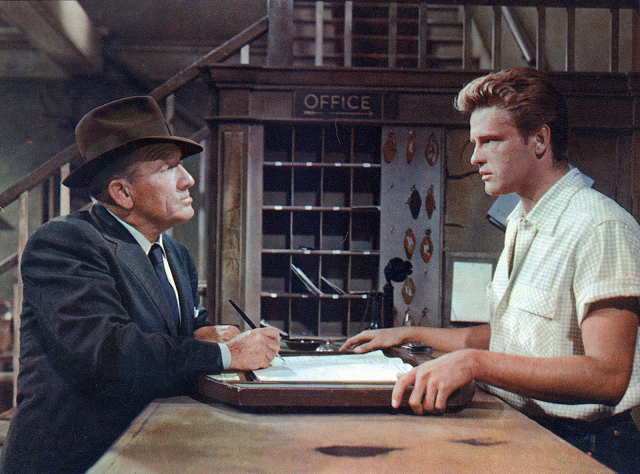
Macreedy (Spencer Tracy) is told by Wirth (John Ericson) that no hotel rooms are available.

- Spencer Tracy as John J. Macreedy
- Robert Ryan as Reno Smith
- Anne Francis as Liz Wirth
- Dean Jagger as Sheriff Tim Horn
- Walter Brennan as Doc Velie
- John Ericson as Pete Wirth
- Ernest Borgnine as Coley Trimble
- Lee Marvin as Hector David
- Russell Collins as Mr Hastings
- Walter Sande as Sam, the diner owner

The small cast includes three past and two future Academy Award winners; one past Academy Award nominee; and one future Golden Globe winner. Brennan (1936, 1938, 1940), Jagger (1950), and Tracy (1938, 1939) had all won Academy Awards. Ryan (1948) had been nominated for one. In subsequent years, Borgnine (1956) and Marvin (1965) both won Academy Awards; and Francis (1965) won a Golden Globe.

== Production ==
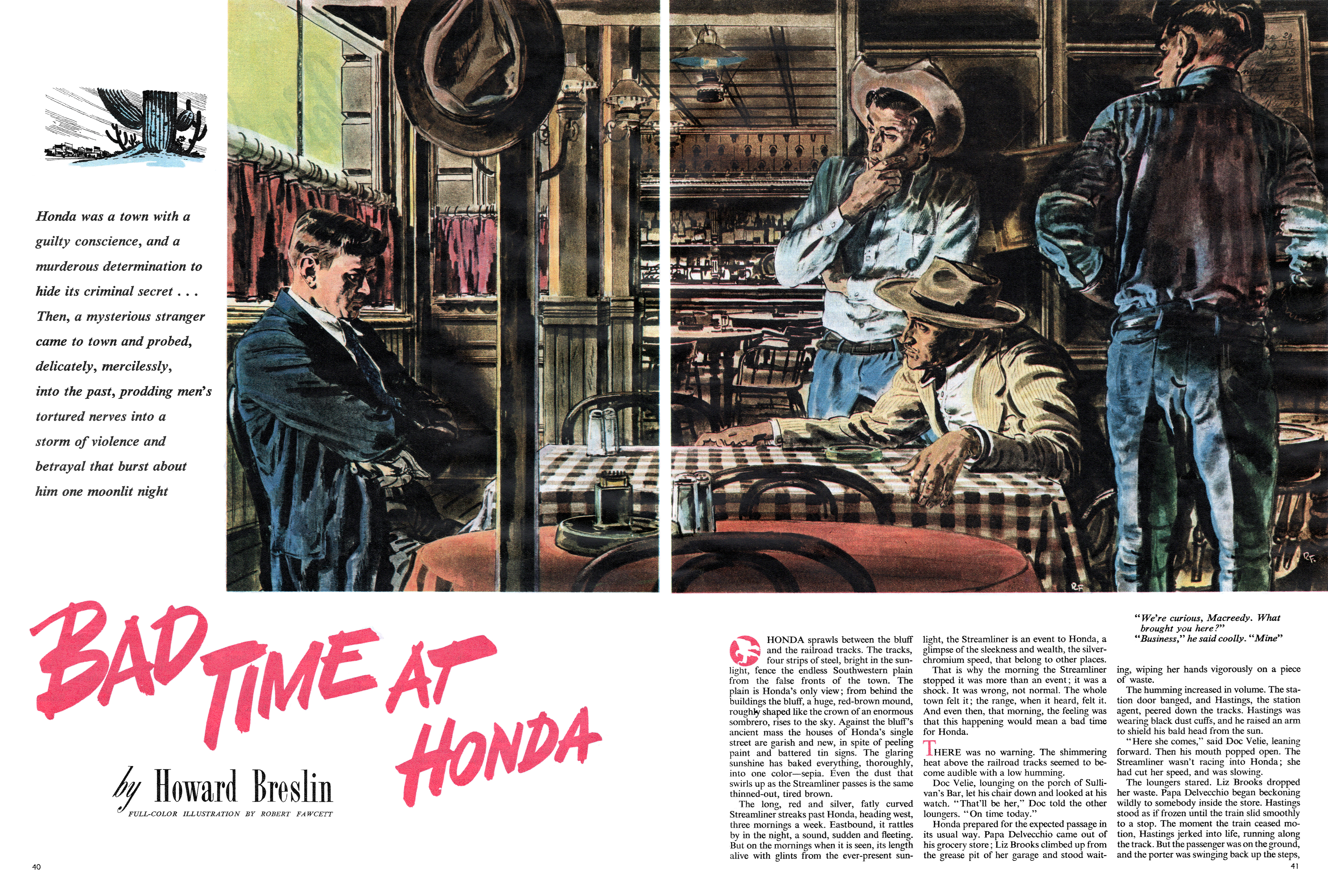
Robert Fawcett illustrated The American Magazine printing of "Bad Time at Honda", a 1947 short story by Howard Breslin that was adapted for the film.

Bad Day at Black Rock originated as a short story by Howard Breslin with full-color illustrations by Robert Fawcett. Titled "Bad Time at Honda", it was published by The American Magazine in January 1947. It was adapted into a script by Don McGuire and pitched to Metro-Goldwyn-Mayer production head Dore Schary, who was known for championing films that addressed social problems. Schary had previously produced Go for Broke! (1951), based on the exploits of the segregated Japanese-American 442nd Regimental Combat Team. Breslin novelized the script, using the pseudonym Michael Niall. His book was published in 1954 by Fawcett Publications.

Schary acquired the film rights for Metro-Goldwyn-Mayer, but he hired Millard Kaufman to rewrite McGuire's script. The producers were worried about the title, because "Bad Time at Honda" was similar to Hondo, a recently-made John Wayne film. Kaufman suggested changing the name of the town to Black Rock, after a real town in Arizona. Kaufman finished the script in the fall of 1953.

Although Spencer Tracy was 54 and much older than the platoon leader in the original story, Schary wanted Tracy to play the lead role. John Sturges was hired as director in June 1954, and shooting began the following month near Lone Pine, California, where the small town set had been quickly constructed. Just before shooting began, an indecisive Tracy tried to back out of the picture. Schary made clear that he was willing to sue the actor if he quit the film. After 20 years with MGM, Bad Day at Black Rock was Tracy's final film for the studio, with the exception of How the West Was Won (1963), for which he provided the narration.

The film was budgeted at $1.3 million. It was shot in Eastmancolor using CinemaScope, because Schary thought that widescreen would emphasize the menace of the isolated town. Temperatures on location were over 100 °F (38 °C). On August 9, the cast and crew relocated to the MGM studio lot in Culver City. André Previn was hired to write the score.

Although the film is essentially a crime drama set in 1945, it is generally regarded as a neo-Western, with strong links to the revisionist Western genre. The premiere was at Loew's 72nd Street Theatre in New York City on December 8, 1954. The film was released nationally in January 1955. According to MGM records, it earned US$1,966,000 in the US and Canada, and $1,822,000 elsewhere, making the studio a profit of $947,000.

== Themes ==
Film historian Stuart M. Kaminsky, in American Film Genres (1985), contrasts the ideology that guides Spencer Tracy's McCreedy, with the key motivating factor in samurai tradition:

There is a crucial difference between Tracy and a samurai hero. Tracy is very much interested in preserving his own life. He wants to bring about justice, but he will escape without providing it if he must. Duty to a cause is the guiding principle for a samurai...Death is not relevant; it is, in fact, ennobling if it comes in the service of one's lord. The Western hero has a great sense of self; the samurai has a great sense of subordination of self.

Although essentially a crime drama with revisionist Western overtones, the film is one of the first to recognize discrimination against Japanese in World War II. No Japanese characters are portrayed, although Komoko and his son, both dead, are central to the plot. In her 1991 documentary film History and Memory: For Akiko and Takashige, Rea Tajiri uses footage from Bad Day at Black Rock to illustrate prevailing attitudes toward the Japanese. Tajiri's family were among those interned after the attack on Pearl Harbor.

John Streamas describes the film as an indictment of both racism and McCarthyism. He comments on the unusual means of denunciation that it employs, because with no Japanese characters in the story, there is no liberation of an oppressed victim. Instead, the plot delivers justice for the victim of a murder that occurred four years earlier.

== Reception ==
=== Critical response ===
When Bad Day at Black Rock was released, the reviews were almost universally positive with, for example, John O'Hara in Collier's hailing it as "one of the finest motion pictures ever made". Many reviewers noted the film's Western-like elements, comparing it favorably with High Noon and cinematographer William C. Mellor was widely praised for his use of widescreen. Film critic Bosley Crowther of The New York Times wrote: "Slowly, through a process of guarded discourse, which director John Sturges has built up by patient, methodical pacing, an eerie light begins to glimmer". At the end of 1955, The New York Times included the film in its best ten of the year.

Despite a storyline she called "crudely melodramatic", Pauline Kael heaped praise on the film for its direction and cinematography, calling it "a very superior example of motion picture craftsmanship". Variety magazine's reviewer wrote: "Considerable excitement is whipped up in this suspense drama, and fans who go for tight action will find it entirely satisfactory. Besides telling a yarn of tense suspense, the picture is concerned with a social message on civic complacency". On the review aggregator website Rotten Tomatoes, 97% of 36 critics' reviews are positive, with an average rating of 8.6/10.

=== Honors ===
Bad Day at Black Rock was nominated for three Academy Awards at the 1956 ceremony: Tracy for Best Actor, Sturges for Best Director, and Kaufman for Best Screenplay. Tracy won the Cannes Film Festival Award for Best Actor at the 1955 Cannes Film Festival.

In 2018, the film was selected for preservation in the United States National Film Registry by the Library of Congress as being "culturally, historically, or aesthetically significant".

Award	Category	Nominee(s)	Result
Academy Awards	Best Director	John Sturges	Nominated
Academy Awards	Best Actor	Spencer Tracy	Nominated (Note: The award was won by Tracy's Black Rock co-star Ernest Borgnine for his performance in Marty.)
Academy Awards	Best Screenplay	Millard Kaufman	Nominated
Boston Society of Film Critics Awards	Special Commendation		Won
British Academy Film Awards	Best Film from any Source		Nominated
British Academy Film Awards	United Nations Award		Nominated
Cannes Film Festival	Palme d'Or	John Sturges	Nominated
Cannes Film Festival	Best Actor	Spencer Tracy	Won (Note: Tied with the ensemble cast of A Big Family.)
Directors Guild of America Awards	Outstanding Directorial Achievement in Motion Pictures	John Sturges	Nominated
National Board of Review Awards	Top Ten Films		4th Place
National Film Preservation Board	National Film Registry		Inducted
Writers Guild of America Awards	Best Written American Drama	Millard Kaufman	Nominated

== Bibliography ==
- Andersen, Christopher P. (1997). An Affair to Remember. New York City: William Morrow and Co. ISBN 978-06-88153-11-3.
- Kaminsky, Stuart M. (1985). American Film Genres (Second ed.). Chicago: Nelson-Hall. pp. 66–67. ISBN 0-88229-826-7.
- Newman, Kim (1990). Wild West Movies. London: Bloomsbury Publishing Ltd. ISBN 978-07-47507-47-5.
- Streamas, John (Spring–Summer 2003). ""Patriotic Drunk": To be Yellow, Brave, and Disappeared in Bad Day at Black Rock". American Studies. 44 (1/2, New Voices in American Studies). Mid-America American Studies Association: 99–114. JSTOR 40643435.
