= What's Worth While? =

1921 film

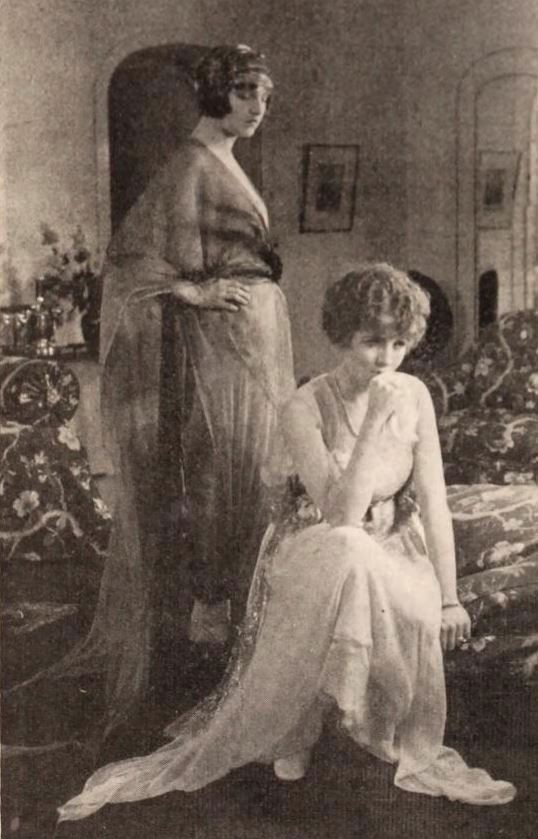
- Still with Mona Lisa and Claire Windsor
- Directed by: Lois Weber
- Screenplay by: Lois Weber
- Produced by: Lois Weber
- Starring: Claire Windsor; Arthur Stuart Hull; Mona Lisa; Louis Calhern; Edwin Stevens
- Cinematography: William C. Foster
- Production companies: Lois Weber Productions; Famous Players–Lasky Corporation
- Distributed by: Paramount Pictures
- Release date: February 27, 1921
- Running time: 60 minutes
- Country: United States
- Language: Silent (English intertitles)

What's Worth While? is a 1921 American silent drama film written and directed by Lois Weber and starring Claire Windsor, Arthur Stuart Hull, Mona Lisa, Louis Calhern, and Edwin Stevens. The film was released on February 27, 1921, by Paramount Pictures.

== Cast ==
- Claire Windsor as Phoebe Jay Morrison
- Arthur Stuart Hull as Mr. Morrison
- Mona Lisa as Sophia
- Louis Calhern as 'Squire' Elton
- Edwin Stevens as Rowan

== Preservation status ==
A print of What's Worth While? is in the collection of the Library of Congress Packard Campus.
