= The Price of a Good Time =

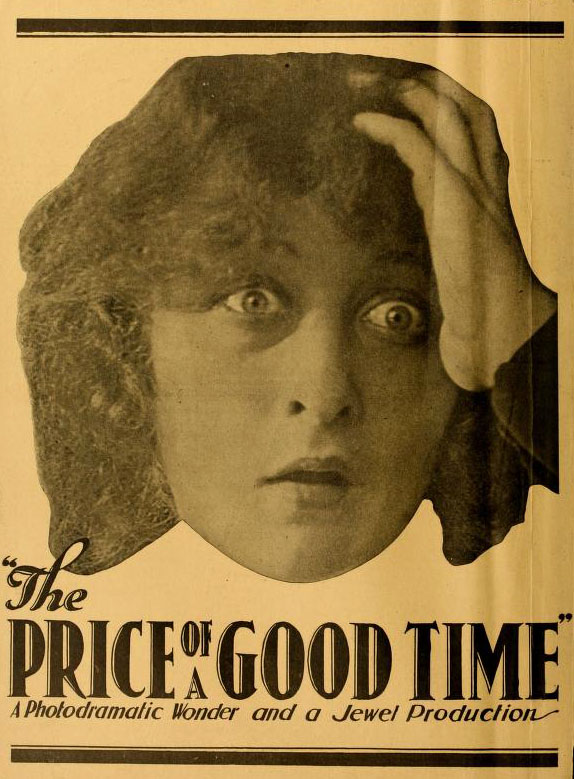
- Advertisement
- Directed by: Lois Weber; Phillips Smalley; Arthur Forde (asst. director)
- Written by: Ethel Weber (continuity); Lois Weber
- Based on: "The Whim" by Marion Orth
- Produced by: Lois Weber
- Starring: Mildred Harris
- Cinematography: Allen G. Siegler and/or Duke Hayward
- Distributed by: Universal Film Manufacturing Company
- Release date: November 4, 1917
- Running time: 5-6 reels
- Country: United States
- Language: Silent (English intertitles)

The Price of a Good Time is a 1917 American silent drama film directed by Lois Weber and Phillips Smalley and starring teen Mildred Harris. It is currently considered a lost film.

== Cast ==
- Mildred Harris as Linnie
- Anne Schaefer as Her Mother
- Helene Rosson as Molly
- Kenneth Harlan as Preston Winfield
- Alfred Allen as His Father
- Adele Farrington as His Mother
- Gertrude Astor as Miss Schyler

== Advertisements ==
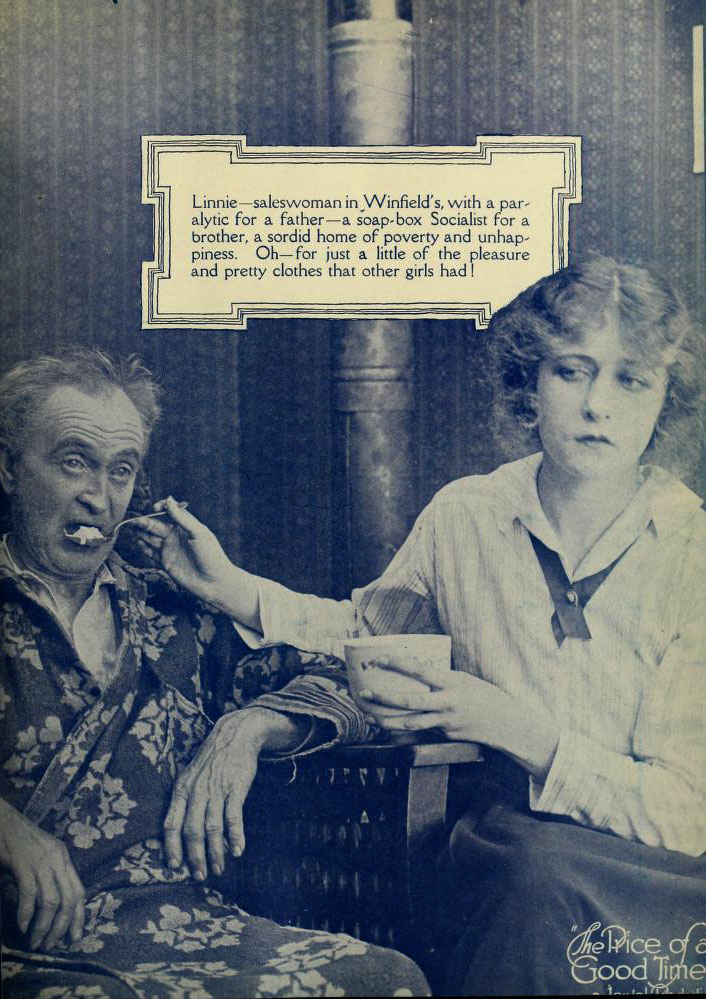

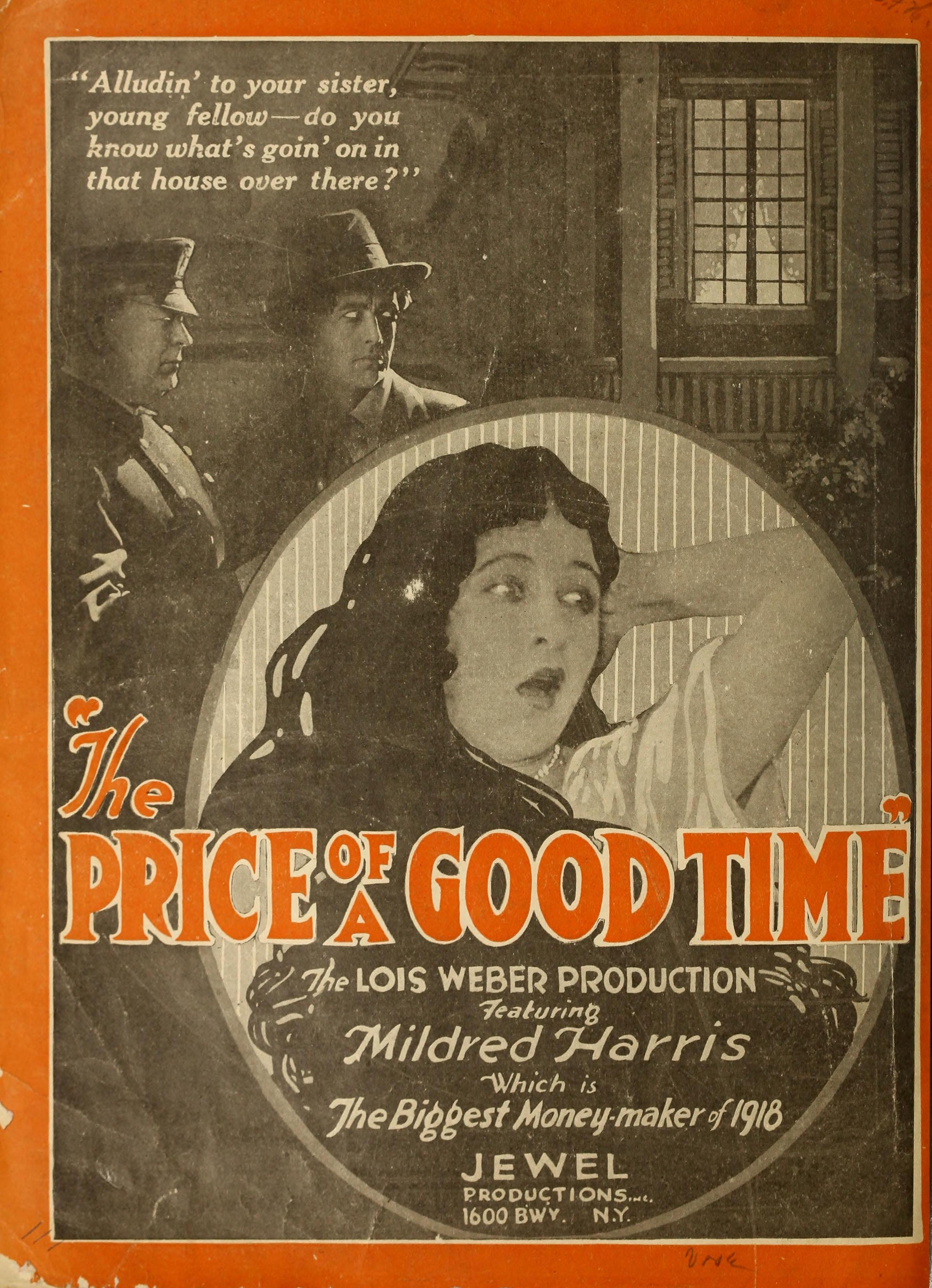

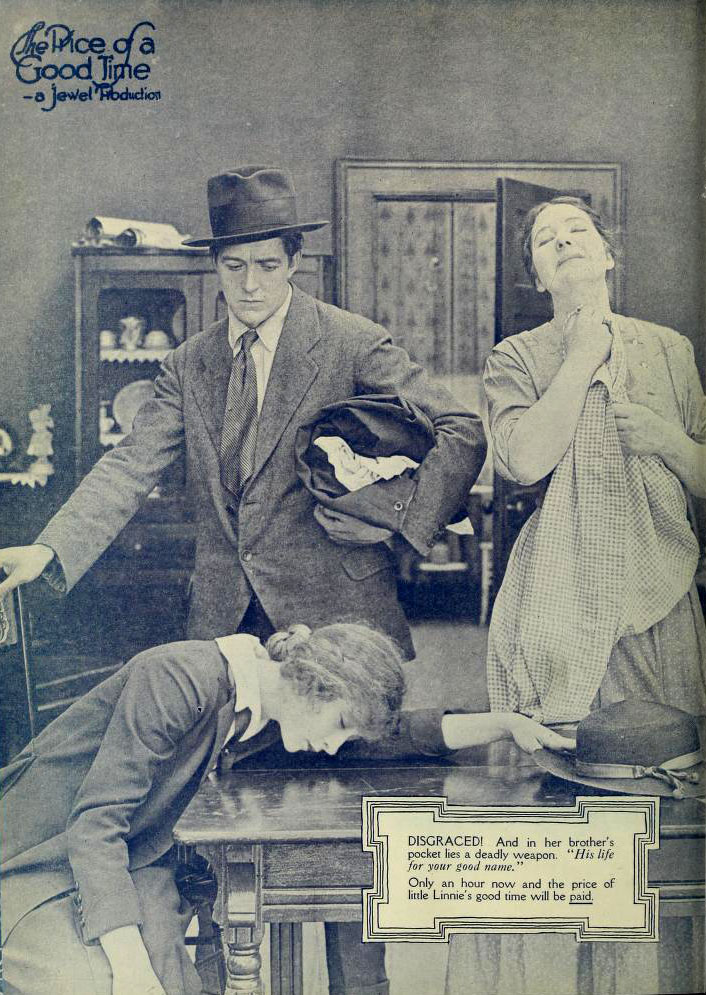
