= John Sturges =

American film director (1910–1992)

- Born: John Eliot Sturges; January 3, 1910; Oak Park, Illinois, U.S.
- Died: August 18, 1992 (aged 82); San Luis Obispo, California, U.S.
- Occupation: Film director
- Relatives: Noah Wyle (step-grandson)

John Eliot Sturges (/ˈstɜːrdʒɪs/ STUR-jiss; January 3, 1910 – August 18, 1992) was an American film director. His films include Bad Day at Black Rock (1955), Gunfight at the O.K. Corral (1957), The Magnificent Seven (1960), The Great Escape (1963), and Ice Station Zebra (1968). In 2013 and 2018, respectively, The Magnificent Seven and Bad Day at Black Rock were selected for preservation in the United States National Film Registry by the Library of Congress as being "culturally, historically, or aesthetically significant".

== Career ==
Sturges started his career in Hollywood as an editor in 1932. During World War II, Sturges directed documentaries and training films as a captain in the United States Army Air Forces First Motion Picture Unit. Sturges' mainstream directorial career began with The Man Who Dared (1946), the first of many B movies. In the suspense film Bad Day at Black Rock (1955), he made imaginative use of the widescreen CinemaScope format by placing Spencer Tracy alone against a vast desert panorama, receiving a Best Director Oscar nomination for the film. Over the course of his career, Sturges developed a reputation for elevated character-based drama within the confines of genre filmmaking. He was awarded the Golden Boot Award in 1992 for his lifetime contribution to Westerns.

He once met Akira Kurosawa, who told him that he loved The Magnificent Seven (which was a remake of Kurosawa's Seven Samurai). Sturges considered this the proudest moment of his professional career. The Magnificent Seven was selected for preservation in the National Film Registry in 2013. Sturges commented that its popularity is due in part as a springboard for several young actors, transporting the locale from Japan to Mexico, putting a twist into the career of Yul Brynner, and having part of its score used as the Marlboro cigarette commercial theme. He died in 1992.

== Awards ==
- Nominee Best Director — Academy Awards (Bad Day at Black Rock)
- Nominee Palme d'Or — Cannes Film Festival (Bad Day at Black Rock)
- Nominee Best Director — Directors Guild of America (Bad Day at Black Rock)
- Nominee Best Director — Directors Guild of America (Gunfight at the O.K. Corral (film))
- Winner Best Foreign Language Film — Blue Ribbon Awards (Japan) (The Old Man and the Sea)
- Nominee Best Picture — Hugo Awards (Marooned) (also, screenwriter Mayo Simon, author Martin Caidin)
- Nominee Grand Prix — Moscow International Film Festival (The Great Escape)
- Winner "Golden Eddie" Filmmaker of the Year — American Cinema Editors (1970)
- Winner Golden Boot Award (1992)

Directed Academy Award performances
Under Sturges' direction, these actors have received Academy Award nominations for their performances in their respective roles.

| Year | Performer | Film | Result |
Academy Award for Best Actor
| 1950 | Louis Calhern | The Magnificent Yankee | Nominated |
| 1955 | Spencer Tracy | Bad Day at Black Rock | Nominated |
| 1958 | Spencer Tracy | The Old Man and the Sea | Nominated |

== Filmography ==
- The Man Who Dared (1946)
- Shadowed (1946)
- Alias Mr. Twilight (1946)
- For the Love of Rusty (1947)
- Keeper of the Bees (1947)
- Thunderbolt (1947)
- The Sign of the Ram (1948)
- Best Man Wins (1948)
- The Walking Hills (1949)
- The Magnificent Yankee (1950)
- The Capture (1950)
- Mystery Street (1950)
- Right Cross (1950)
- Kind Lady (1951)
- The People Against O'Hara (1951)
- It's a Big Country (1951)
- The Girl in White (1952)
- Jeopardy (1953)
- Fast Company (1953)
- Escape from Fort Bravo (1953)
- Bad Day at Black Rock (1955)
- Underwater! (1955)
- The Scarlet Coat (1955)
- Backlash (1956)
- Gunfight at the O.K. Corral (1957)
- Saddle the Wind (uncredited, 1958)
- The Law and Jake Wade (1958)
- The Old Man and the Sea (1958)
- Last Train from Gun Hill (1959)
- Never So Few (1959)
- The Magnificent Seven (1960)
- By Love Possessed (1961)
- Sergeants 3 (1962)
- A Girl Named Tamiko (1963)
- The Great Escape (1963)
- The Satan Bug (1965)
- The Hallelujah Trail (1965)
- Hour of the Gun (1967)
- Ice Station Zebra (1968)
- Marooned (1969)
- Le Mans (uncredited; quit during production, 1971)
- Joe Kidd (1972)
- Chino (1973)
- McQ (1974)
- The Eagle Has Landed (1976)
