= Millard Kaufman =

American screenwriter and novelist (1917–2009)

- Born: March 12, 1917; Baltimore, Maryland, U.S.
- Died: March 14, 2009 (aged 92); Los Angeles, California, U.S.
- Education: Baltimore City College; Johns Hopkins University
- Occupations: Screenwriter; novelist
- Spouse: Lorraine Paley
- Writing career
- Notable work: Bad Day at Black Rock (1955)

Millard Kaufman (March 12, 1917 – March 14, 2009) was an American screenwriter and novelist. His works include the Academy Award-nominated Bad Day at Black Rock (1955). He was also one of the creators of Mr. Magoo.

== Early life ==
Kaufman was born and raised in Baltimore and graduated from the Baltimore City College (high school). He eventually graduated from Johns Hopkins University after work as a merchant seaman. After that, he moved to New York City, taking a job as copyboy for the New York Daily News. At some point, he married Lorraine Paley.

He enlisted in the Marines in 1942, served on Guadalcanal, and landed at Guam with the 1st Marine Brigade (Provisional), where he wrote an article for the Marine Corps Gazette about the battle. He participated in the Okinawa with the 6th Marine Division.

== Screenwriting ==
While serving in the Pacific, Kaufman had contracted malaria and dengue fever, and upon his return to the United States, felt he could no longer deal with the extremes of the New York City climate. He and his wife moved to California where he took up screenwriting. In 1949, Kaufman wrote the screenplay for the short film Ragtime Bear, which was the first appearance of Mr. Magoo. He followed this up in 1950 with another UPA film, Punchy de Leon, featuring The Fox and The Crow.

In 1950, Kaufman lent his name to screenwriter Dalton Trumbo, who had been blacklisted after investigation by the House Un-American Activities Committee, for the screenplay for Gun Crazy.

In 1953, he received an Academy Award nomination for his screenplay for Take the High Ground!. In 1955, he received another nomination for his screenplay for Bad Day at Black Rock. Although he usually worked as a writer, he also directed Convicts 4 (1962) and served as associate producer for Raintree County (1957).

McSweeney's published Kaufman's first fiction novel, titled Bowl of Cherries, in October 2007. Kaufman was 86 years old when he began work on the novel and 90 when it was published. His second novel, Misadventure, was published posthumously. He also published a screenwriting manual, Plots & Characters: A Screenwriter on Screenwriting.

== Death ==
Kaufman died aged 92 in Los Angeles of heart failure after open heart surgery.

== Work ==
=== Films ===
- The Big Blow (1948)
- Ragtime Bear (1949)
- Punchy de Leon (1950)
- Unknown World (1951)
- Aladdin and His Lamp (1952)
- Take the High Ground! (1953)
- Bad Day at Black Rock (1955)
- Raintree County (1957) (also associate producer)
- Never So Few (1959)
- Convicts 4 (1962) (also directed)
- The War Lord (1965)
- Living Free (1972)
- The Klansman (1974)

=== Television ===
- Police Story (1973)
- The Nativity (1978)
- Enola Gay: The Men, the Mission, the Atomic Bomb (1980)

=== Books ===
- Plots & Characters: A Screenwriter on Screenwriting (2001)
- Bowl of Cherries (2007) – paperback (2008)
- Misadventure (2010)

== Image ==
- Millard Kaufman at age 90
