= Louis Calhern =

American actor (1895–1956)

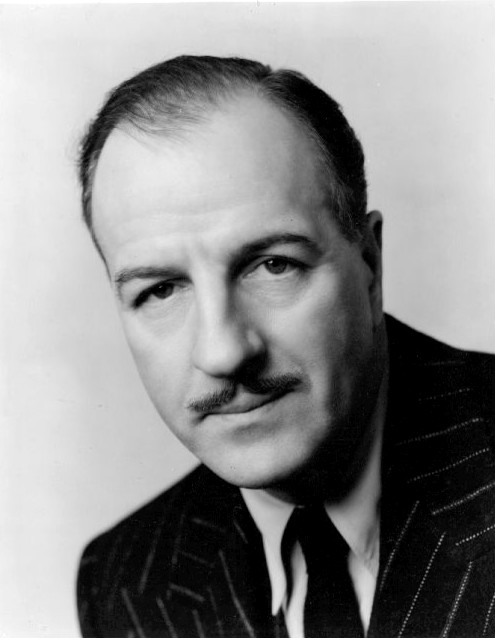
- Calhern in 1946
- Born: Carl Henry Vogt; February 19, 1895; Brooklyn, New York, U.S.
- Died: May 12, 1956 (aged 61); Nara, Nara, Japan
- Resting place: Hollywood Forever Cemetery
- Occupation: Actor
- Years active: 1921–1956
- Spouses: Ilka Chase (m. 1926; div. 1927) Julia Hoyt (m. 1927; div. 1932) Natalie Schafer (m. 1933; div. 1942) Marianne Stewart (m. 1946; div. 1955)
- Military career
- Allegiance: United States
- Branch: United States Army
- Conflicts: World War I; Western Front

Carl Henry Vogt (February 19, 1895 – May 12, 1956), known by his stage name Louis Calhern, was an American actor. Described by one film historian as a “star leading man of the theater and a star character actor of the screen,” he appeared in over 100 roles on the Broadway stage and in films and television, between 1923 and 1956. He was nominated for the Academy Award and the Golden Globe Award for Best Actor for portraying U.S. Supreme Court Justice Oliver Wendell Holmes in the 1950 film The Magnificent Yankee.

Often cast as distinguished and sophisticated characters, Calhern appeared in several other notable film roles including the scheming Ambassador Trentino in the classic Marx Brothers comedy Duck Soup (1933), the antagonist to Robert Donat's Edmond Dantès in The Count of Monte Cristo (1934), the head of the US Secret Service in Alfred Hitchcock's Notorious (1946), the pivotal villain Alonzo Emmerich in John Huston’s film noir The Asphalt Jungle (1950), Buffalo Bill in the musical Annie Get Your Gun (1950), and the title character in the Joseph L. Mankiewicz all-star adaption of Julius Caesar (1953). He won a Special Jury Prize at the 15th Venice International Film Festival for his performance in Executive Suite (1954).

== Early life ==
Calhern was born Carl Henry Vogt in Brooklyn, New York, in 1895, the son of German immigrants Eugene Adolf Vogt and Hubertina Friese Vogt. He had one known sibling, a sister. His father was a tobacco dealer. His family left New York while he was in elementary school and moved to St. Louis, Missouri, where he was raised. While playing high school football, a stage manager from a touring theatrical stock company noticed the tall, handsome youth and hired him as a bit player. Another source states, "Grace George hired his entire high school football team as supers for a Shakespearean play."

== Career ==
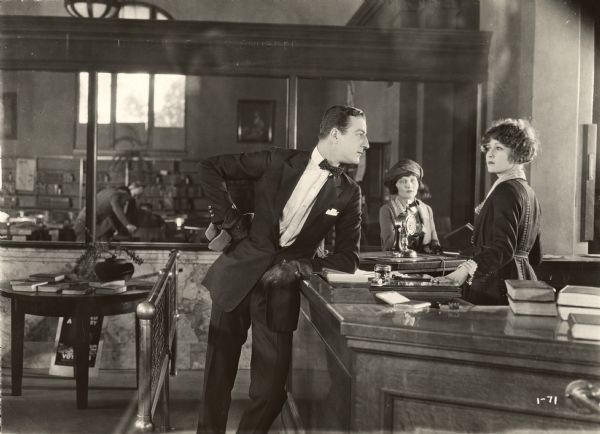
Calhern and Claire Windsor in The Blot (1921) directed by Lois Weber

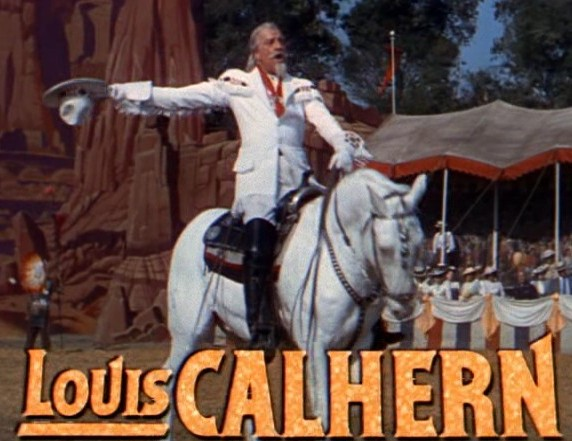
As Buffalo Bill in the trailer for Annie Get Your Gun (1950)

Just before World War I, Calhern returned to New York to pursue an acting career. He began as a prop boy and bit player with various touring and burlesque companies. He became a matinee idol after being in a play titled Cobra. Calhern's burgeoning career was interrupted by World War I; he served in France in the 143rd Field Artillery of the U.S. Army.

Due to the anti-German sentiment during World War I, he changed his German given name, Carl. His stage name is an amalgam of his adopted hometown of St. Louis and his first and middle names, Carl and Henry (Calhern).

Calhern began working in silent films for director Lois Weber in the early 1920s, the most notable being The Blot (1921). A newspaper article commented: "The new arrival in stardom is Louis Calhern, who, until Miss Weber engaged him to enact the leading male role in What's Worth While?, had been playing leads in the Morosco Stock company of Los Angeles."

In 1923, Calhern left the movies, deciding to devote his career entirely to the stage. He returned to films early in the sound era where he was primarily cast as a character actor, while he continued to play leading roles on the stage. In 1945, Calhern won the Donaldson Award for Best Actor in a Play for his performance in The Magnificent Yankee.

Among Calhern's notable screen portrayals were as the partner in crime to Spencer Tracy and Bette Davis in 20,000 Years in Sing Sing (1932), as Ambassador Trentino in the classic Marx Brothers comedy Duck Soup (1933), as Major Dort in The Life of Emile Zola (1937), and as the spy boss of Cary Grant in Alfred Hitchcock's Notorious (1946).

In 1948, Calhern joined Metro-Goldwyn-Mayer as a contract player, receiving wide acclaim for his many fine supporting performances, including three diverse roles that he appeared in for the studio in 1950: a singing role as Buffalo Bill in the film version of the musical Annie Get Your Gun; as a double-crossing lawyer and sugar daddy to a young Marilyn Monroe in John Huston's The Asphalt Jungle; and his Oscar-nominated performance as Oliver Wendell Holmes in The Magnificent Yankee (his only true starring role in a sound film, re-creating his role from the Broadway stage). He was subsequently cast in the title role of Joseph L. Mankiewicz’s 1953 all-star film version of Shakespeare’s Julius Caesar, earning more praise.

Calhern played the role of the devious George Caswell, the manipulative board member of Tredway Corporation, in the 1954 production of Executive Suite, followed by the role of a jaded, acerbic high school teacher in Blackboard Jungle (1955). His performance as cheerfully lecherous Uncle Willie in High Society (1956), a musical remake of The Philadelphia Story, was his final film appearance.

== Personal life ==
Calhern battled alcoholism for much of his adult life; as a result, he lost several important screen and stage roles. According to former wife Natalie Schafer, Calhern's inability to overcome his addiction ended their marriage. While he was willing to consult doctors, she said Calhern refused to attend Alcoholics Anonymous because he was an atheist and considered AA to be a religious organization. Calhern ultimately overcame his alcohol addiction by the late 1940s.

== Death ==
On May 12, 1956, Calhern, aged 61, died unexpectedly of a heart attack while in Nara, Japan to begin filming The Teahouse of the August Moon (Paul Ford replaced Calhern in the film). His body was cremated and was interred at Hollywood Forever Cemetery in Los Angeles, California.

== Selected filmography ==
- What's Worth While? (1921) as "Squire" Elton
- Too Wise Wives (1921) as Mr. David Graham
- The Blot (1921) as The Professor's Pupil as Phil West
- Woman, Wake Up (1922) as Monte Collins
- The Last Moment (1923) as Harry Gaines
- Stolen Heaven (1931) as Steve Perry
- The Road to Singapore (1931) as Dr. George March
- Blonde Crazy (1931) as Dapper Dan Barker
- Okay, America! (1932) as Mileaway Russell
- Night After Night (1932) as Dick Bolton
- They Call It Sin (1932) as Ford Humphries
- Afraid to Talk (1932) as Asst. District Attorney John Wade
- 20,000 Years in Sing Sing (1932) as Joe Finn
- Frisco Jenny (1932) as Steve Dutton
- The Woman Accused (1933) as Leo Young
- Strictly Personal (1933) as Magruder
- The World Gone Mad (1933) as Christopher Bruno
- Diplomaniacs (1933) as Winkelreid
- Duck Soup (1933) as Ambassador Trentino
- The Count of Monte Cristo (1934) as De Villefort Jr.
- The Man with Two Faces (1934) as Stanley Vance
- The Affairs of Cellini (1934) as Ottaviano
- Sweet Adeline (1934) as Major Day
- The Arizonian (1935) as Sheriff Jake Mannen
- Woman Wanted (1935) as Smiley
- The Last Days of Pompei (1935) as Prefect
- The Gorgeous Hussy (1936) as Sunderland
- Her Husband Lies (1937) as Joe Sorrell
- The Life of Emile Zola (1937) as Major Dort
- Fast Company (1938) as Elias Z. "Eli" Bannerman
- Juarez (1939) as Le Marc
- 5th Ave Girl (1939) as Dr. Kessler
- Charlie McCarthy, Detective (1939) as Arthur Aldrich
- I Take This Woman (1940) as Dr. Duveen
- Dr. Ehrlich's Magic Bullet (1940) as Dr. Brockdorf
- Heaven Can Wait (1943) as Randolph Van Cleve
- Nobody's Darling (1943) as Curtis Farnsworth
- The Bridge of San Luis Rey (1944) as Don Andre, The Viceroy
- Up in Arms (1944) as Colonel Ashley
- Notorious (1946) as Captain Paul Prescott
- Arch of Triumph (1948) as "Col." Boris Morosov
- The Red Pony (1949) as Grandfather
- The Red Danube (1949) as Colonel Piniev
- Nancy Goes to Rio (1950) as Gregory Elliott
- Annie Get Your Gun (1950) as Colonel William "Buffalo Bill" Cody
- The Asphalt Jungle (1950) as Alonzo D. Emmerich
- A Life of Her Own (1950) as Jim Leversoe
- Devil's Doorway (1950) as Verne Coolan
- Two Weeks with Love (1950) as Horatio Robinson
- The Magnificent Yankee (1950) as Oliver Wendell Holmes Jr.
- It's a Big Country (1951) as narrator
- The Man with a Cloak (1951) as Charles Francois Thevenet
- A Letter from a Soldier (1951 short) as narrator
- Invitation (1952) as Simon Bowker
- Washington Story (1952) as Charles W. Birch
- We're Not Married! (1952) as Frederick C. "Freddie" Melrose
- The Prisoner of Zenda (1952) as Col. Zapt
- The Bad and the Beautiful (1952) as voice of Georgia Lorrison's Father
- Confidentially Connie (1953) as Opie Bedloe
- Julius Caesar (1953) as Julius Caesar
- Remains to Be Seen (1953) as Benjamin Goodman
- Latin Lovers (1953) as Grandfather Eduardo Santos
- Main Street to Broadway (1953) as himself
- Executive Suite (1954) as George Nyle Caswell
- Rhapsody (1954) as Nicholas Durant
- Men of the Fighting Lady (1954) as James A. Michener
- The Student Prince (1954) as King Ferdinand of Karlsberg
- Betrayed (1954) as General Ten Eyck
- Athena (1954) as Grandpa Ulysses Mulvain
- The Prodigal (1955) as Nahreeb
- Blackboard Jungle (1955) as Jim Murdock
- Forever, Darling (1956) as Charles Y. Bewell
- High Society (1956) as Uncle Willie

== Stage credits ==
Calhern's Broadway credits include:

- Roger Bloomer (1923)
- The Song and Dance Man (1923–1924)
- Cobra (1924)
- In a Garden (1925–1926)
- Hedda Gabler (1926)
- The Woman Disputed (1926–1927)
- Up the Line (1926)
- The Dark (1927)
- Savages Under the Skin (1927)
- A Distant Drum (1928)
- Gypsy (1929)
- The Love Duel (1929)
- The Rhapsody (1930)
- The Tyrant (1930)
- Give Me Yesterday (1931)
- Brief Moment (1931–1932)
- The Inside Story (1932)
- Birthday (1934–1935)
- Hell Freezes Over (1935–1936)
- Robin Landing (1937)
- Summer Night (1939)
- The Great Big Doorstep (1942)
- Jacobowsky and the Colonel (1944–1945)
- The Magnificent Yankee (1946)
- The Survivors (1948)
- The Play's the Thing (1948)
- King Lear (1950–1951)
- The Wooden Dish (1955)

== Awards and nominations ==
Year	Award	Category	Nominated work	Result	Ref.
1950	Academy Awards	Best Actor	The Magnificent Yankee	Nominated	
1946	Drama League Awards	Distinguished Performance Award	—N/a	Won	
1950	Golden Globe Awards	Best Actor in a Motion Picture – Drama	The Magnificent Yankee	Nominated	
1954	Venice Film Festival	Special Jury Prize for Ensemble Acting	Executive Suite	Won	
