= Lewis Lavenu =

Musician and publisher

- Born: c.1767
- Died: 17 August 1818
- Occupations: musician, music seller and publisher

Lewis Augustus Lavenu (c.1767–17 August 1818) was a musician, music seller and publisher.

He was the second son of John Lavenu, pastry chef to Stephen Fox, Lord Holland (brother of Charles James Fox). His father had opened a coffee house and tavern in Salisbury where he took over the assembly rooms and held concerts for the local gentry and middle classes. Beginning as a violinist in the Covent Garden opera, Lavenu set up his "New Musical Warehouse" at 23, Duke Street, St. James, Piccadilly in 1795. Around 1802 he went into partnership with the printer Charles Mitchell forming Lavenu & Mitchell and in 1805 moved their business to New Bond Street. The partnership with Mitchell ended in 1806, and Lavenu built up a successful business attaining a Royal Warrant as music seller to the Prince Regent (later George IV) by his death on 17 August 1818. Lavenu had married Elizabeth Mackenzie of Greenwich on 3 March 1793 at St George Hanover Square, Westminster. She died on 16 January 1814 and Lavenu married for a second time a woman named Eliza, the mother of his son Lewis Henry Lavenu. The business was further built upon by Eliza who went into partnership with the Anglo-Italian violinist Nicolas Mori. The business was moved to 24, Edward Street, Manchester Square in 1820, the Bond Street premises then being occupied by William Mitchell, the son of Charles Mitchell who had originally been in partnership with Lavenu. The business returned to the New Bond Street premises in 1828 after Mori and Lavenu's marriage on 24 January 1826 at St. Paul's, Covent Garden as "Mori & Lavenu" and continued there until it was sold in the 1840s by Eliza's son Lewis Henry Lavenu. His granddaughter Ethel Lavenu was the mother of the actor Tyrone Power, Sr. and grandmother of the Hollywood star of the 1930s-1950s, Tyrone Power.
