= Salomon Blosset de Loche =

Huguenot army officer (c. 1648 – 1721)

Salomon de Blosset Seigneur de Loche
- Born: c. 1648; Dauphiné, France
- Died: 21 October 1721 (aged 72–73)
- Allegiance: Duchy of Savoy; Williamite England
- Branch: Army of the Duchy of Savoy; English Army
- Service years: c. 1685 – c. 1690s
- Rank: Brigadier-General
- Conflicts: Nine Years' War; Battle of Marsaglia
- Spouses: Catherine Oddos de Bonniot; Name unknown (sister or sister-in-law of Capt. Théophile de la Cour Des Brisay)
- Children: 4

Brigadier-General Salomon de Blosset, Seigneur de Loche (c. 1648 – 21 October 1721) was a Huguenot army officer.

== Early life ==
Born in the Dauphiné to Paul de Blosset, Seigneur des Eissarts, from a family of Huguenots who had left their original home of the Nivernais during the French Wars of Religion (one of the family, Louis de Blosset who led an attack against Corbigny in 1563 escaped the St. Bartholomew's Day massacre in 1572).

== Career ==
After the Revocation of the edict of Nantes in 1685 Loche at first fought in support of the Vaudois (as his father had done in 1663) and at some point came into the service of William of Orange along with many other Huguenot officers. He was recorded as leading a regiment of 800 for the Duke of Savoy on 17 July 1692 and fought at the Battle of Marsaglia in Piedmont on 4 October 1693 (where the Duke of Schomberg's son Charles was killed). He also fought at Brandenburg and in Flanders. As William of Orange became King William III of England, he was granted land in Ireland and settled in Dublin (along with many other Huguenot officers) where he is recorded as receiving 6 shillings per day in pension.

== Personal life ==
He married firstly Catherine Oddos de Bonniot in France and a further time to a sister or sister in law of Captain Theophile de la Cour Des Brisay (whom he named as brother in law and executor in his will). He had four children by his first marriage:

- Colonel Paul de Blosset of Blosset's Regiment of Foot or Blosset's Foot (died 13 November 1719), whose son Solomon Stephen Blosset was ancestor of George Grote and Henrietta, the wife of Henry Jerome de Salis.
- Major Anthony de Blosset
- Captain Salomon or Solomon de Blosset or Blossett married Jeanne daughter of Hector Francois Chataigner de Cramahé from whom descended Colonel John Blossett, and generations of actors beginning with Ethel Lavenu, her son Tyrone Power, Sr. and grandson Tyrone Power.
- Marie de Blosset m. Jacques Teissonière de la Rouvière, Captain of Foot.
