= Cramahe =

Cramahe or Cramahé may refer to:

- Hector Theophilus de Cramahé (1720-1788), Lieutenant-Governor of the Province of Quebec
- Hector François Chataigner de Cramahé, French military officer and father of Hector Theophilus
- Cramahe, Ontario, a Canadian township
