= Hector François Chataigner de Cramahé =

French Huguenot officer

Captain Hector François Chataigner de Cramahé, Chevalier, Seigneur de Cramahé et des Rochers was a Huguenot officer who assisted William of Orange in the taking of the English throne.

Originating from the area of La Rochelle, on the French western coast, where his family owned the Château de Cramahé, after the Revocation of the Edict of Nantes, Cramahé and his brothers fled, himself as a soldier in William of Orange's army and the others Henry Augustus and Alexandre Thésée, Sieur de Lisle to South Carolina.

At first captain of a regiment of foot, he then became captain of horse of Galway's regiment, becoming aide de camp to Henri de Massue, 1st Earl of Galway. Along with numerous other Huguenot officers, he settled in Dublin, where he received a pension of 4 shillings per day.

He married Marianne, daughter of Jacques de Belrieu, Baron de Virazel, by whom he had numerous children. His son Hector Theophilus de Cramahé was lieutenant governor of the Province of Quebec and titular lieutenant governor of Detroit. His daughter Jeanne married the son of Salomon Blosset de Loche from whom descended Colonel John Blossett and the actors Tyrone Power, Sr., and Tyrone Power.
