= Lewis Henry Lavenu =

English composer and conductor

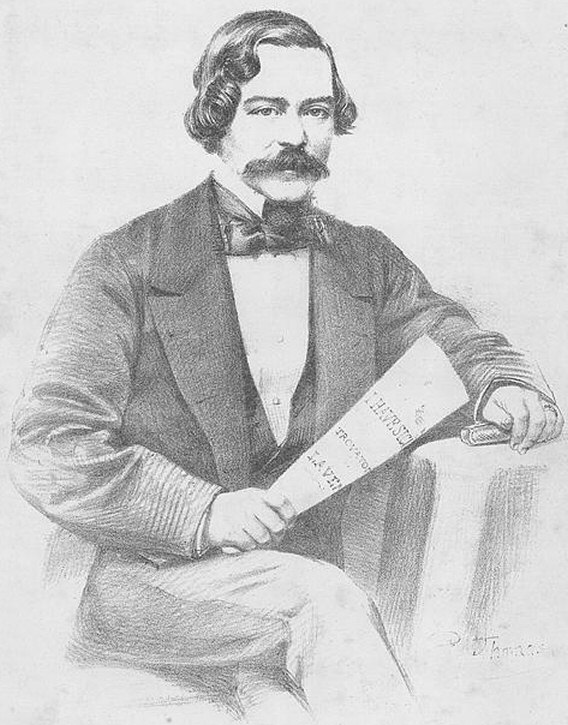
- Engraving of Lavenu on the cover of his work Molly Asthore
- Born: 1818; London
- Died: 1859 (aged 40–41); Macquarie Street, Sydney
- Occupations: Composer, conductor, musician and impresario

Lewis Henry Lavenu (1818–1859) was an English composer, conductor, musician and impresario.

== Life and career ==
Lavenu was born in London in 1818, the only son, by his second wife Eliza, of Lewis Lavenu, music publisher to the Prince Regent. Shortly after his birth, his father died and his mother went into business with the violinist Nicolas Mori, a pupil of Viotti by whom she had 5 children, although they weren't married until 1826 (in St. Paul's, Covent Garden).

Lavenu studied at the Royal Academy of Music, firstly with the French harpist Nicolas-Charles Bochsa, and subsequently with Charles Lucas, George Alexander Macfarren, and Cipriani Potter in composition, cello and piano. In 1840 Lavenu arranged two tours of the British Isles for the composer and pianist Franz Liszt, accompanied by his half brother Frank Mori, two female singers and John Orlando Parry, an all round musician, singer and entertainer (who vividly recorded the tour in his diary). Between 17 August and 26 September, they gave 50 concerts around England which were generally unsuccessful, having an average attendance of 140. The second tour which encompassed Liverpool, Ireland and Scotland from November 1840 to January 1841 was mildly more successful, with audiences of more than 1200 in Dublin. The tour was however a financial failure, and Liszt waived his promised 500 guineas a month fee.

In May, 1844, Lavenu, who had been in partnership with Robert Hodson in the Music publishing business which he had inherited from his mother and stepfather, Mori, Lavenu, & Co. sold the business to Hodson who then went into partnership with Robert Addison forming Addison & Hodson. Addison had formerly been in partnership with Johann Baptist Cramer and Thomas Frederick Beale in the business of J. B. Cramer, Addison & Beale.

In November, 1846 Lavenu's first major work Loretta; A Tale of Seville, a grand opera in three parts with libretto by Alfred Bunn premiered at Drury Lane Theatre before a crowded audience. Anna Bishop sung the role of Loretta, and the role of the father Don Juanita was sung by W. H. Weiss. The Times, which made an extensive review of the opera described it as showing "but few indications of inexperience", and was rather the "work of a practiced hand", finally describing the opera as "one of the most promising in our recollection".

After falling into insolvency in 1848, Lavenu became the conductor of the Irish singer Catherine Hayes, making appearances in Great Britain, the United States (1851–52) and Australia (1855). Lavenu stayed in Sydney becoming the musical director of the Sydney Theatre and the teacher and conductor of the singer Marie Carandini. In July 1859 Lavenu (on cello) took part in a grand festival to inaugurate the new Great Hall of the University of Sydney with Carandini, Sara Flower, Emma Howson, Frank Howson and Walter Sherwin but died at the height of the festivities in Macquarie Street, being buried in Camperdown cemetery alongside his tutor Bochsa, and his fellow English composer Isaac Nathan.

Lavenu had eight children with Julia, daughter of Colonel John Blossett, the head of the British expedition which aided Simón Bolívar in the wars of independence. His daughters Ada, Eliza, Alice and Bessie were actresses in London during the 1860s, Eliza becoming more successful, appearing at the Theatre Royal, Lyceum. She was the mother of the actor Tyrone Power, Sr., and grandmother of the Hollywood star Tyrone Power. His daughter Alice changed her name to Suzanne Madeleine-Julie-Alice Lavenu and married a nobleman, Pedro Alonso Jimenez, the son of Alonso Jimenez, the Marques de la Granja de San Saturnino in 1875.
