= W. Tyrone Power =

British artist, soldier and author (1819–1911)

- Born: William James Tyrone Power; 1819
- Died: 1911 (aged 91–92)
- Occupations: artist, soldier and author
- Relatives: Tyrone Guthrie (grandson)

Sir William James Tyrone Power (1819 – 1911) was an artist, soldier and author who served as Commissary General in Chief of the British Army and briefly Agent-General for New Zealand. His images of New Zealand during the 1840s provide an important source for information about the years immediately prior to and during the first years of the New Zealand Wars, during which time he lived in Wanganui.

His grandson, Sir Tyrone Guthrie, was a notable theatre director. Power was related to the Irish-American acting family, several members of whom shared his name. His father, Tyrone Power, was a noted Irish actor whose descendants include Hollywood actors Tyrone Power Sr. (1869–1931), Tyrone Power (1914–1958), and Tyrone Power Jr. (born 1959).

== Publications ==
- Sketches in New Zealand, with pen and pencil : from a journal kept in that country from July 1846, to June 1848
- Recollections of a three years' residence in China : including peregrinations in Spain, Morocco, Egypt, India, Australia, and New Zealand
