= Taryn Power =

American actress (1953–2020)

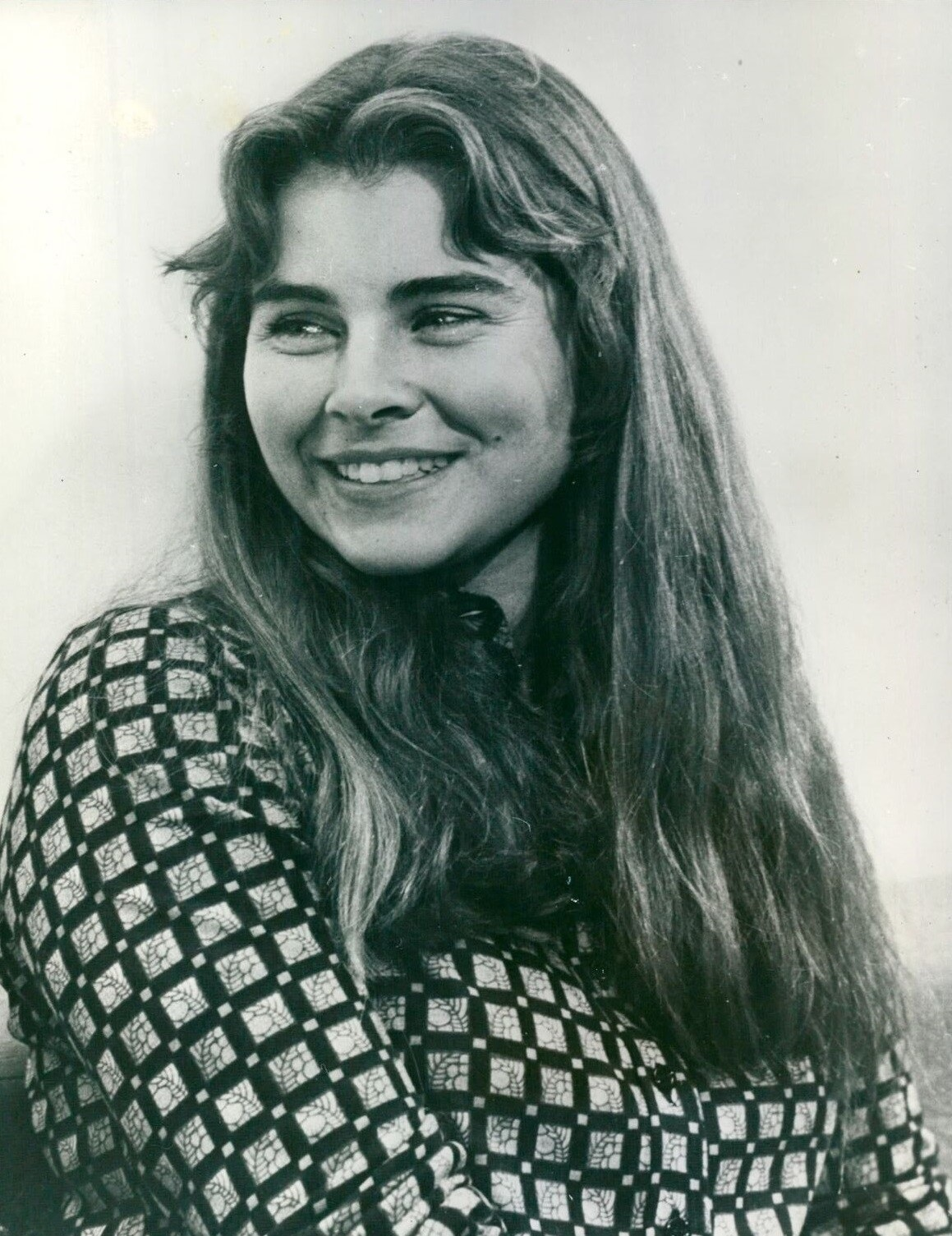
- Power in 1974
- Born: Taryn Stephanie Power; September 13, 1953; Los Angeles, California, United States
- Died: June 26, 2020 (aged 66); Viroqua, Wisconsin, United States
- Other name: Taryn Power-Greendeer
- Occupation: Actress
- Years active: 1972–1990
- Spouses: Norman Seeff (m. 1978; div. 1982) Tony Fox Sales (divorced) William Greendeer (m. 1993, divorced)
- Children: 4
- Parent(s): Tyrone Power; Linda Christian
- Relatives: Romina Power (sister); Tyrone Power Jr. (half-brother); Tyrone Power Sr. (grandfather); Tyrone Power (great-great-grandfather)

Taryn Stephanie Power (September 13, 1953 – June 26, 2020) was an American actress.

== Early life, family and education ==
Power was born in Los Angeles, California, in 1953, to actors Tyrone Power and Linda Christian. When her parents divorced in 1956, her mother took Taryn and her elder sister Romina to live all around the world, mainly spending their childhoods in Mexico City (her mother's mother's home), Italy, and Spain. Power's father died in 1958 of a heart attack when she was five years old. She was educated during her later youth at boarding schools in England.

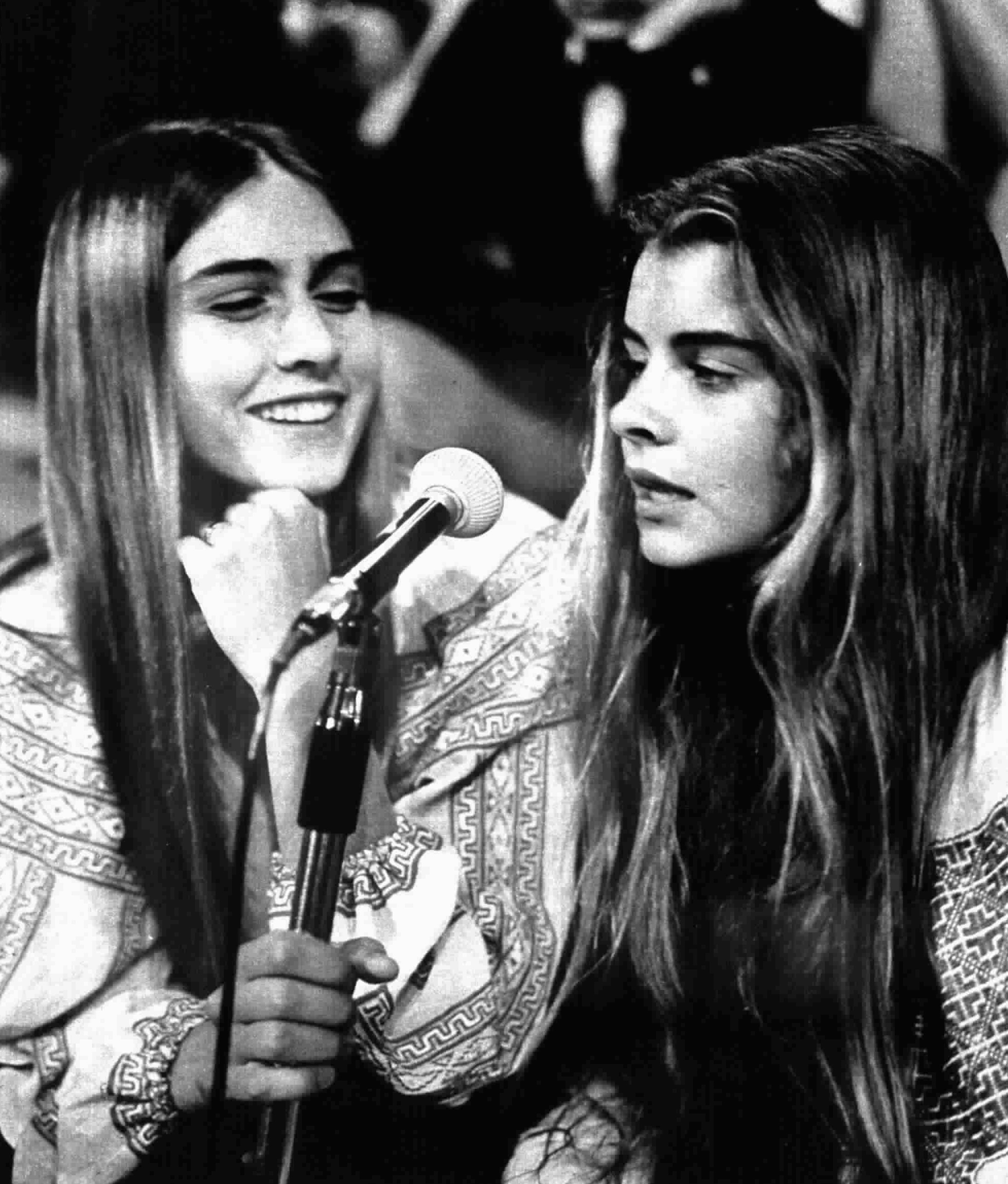
Romina and Taryn Power, guests of the Italian TV show Tutto è pop, Turin, 1972

== Career ==
Taryn Power acted in eight films. Her first two were in Spanish, and the rest were mostly English language films. The first film was the Mexican film Maria (1972); she was the starring role and was cast when she was 18 years old. She played Valentine De Villefort in The Count of Monte Cristo (1975), which starred Richard Chamberlain, Donald Pleasence, and Tony Curtis; her character's father was played by Louis Jourdan. She played Dione in Sinbad and the Eye of the Tiger (1977), starring Patrick Wayne (son of John Wayne) and Jane Seymour. On television, she acted in an episode of Matt Houston.

== Personal life and death ==
In 1975, she met photographer Norman Seeff in Los Angeles, and eventually married him shortly before the birth of her first child, Tai. Her relationship with Seeff faded, ending in divorce in 1982.

Power lived with rock musician Tony Sales (son of comedian Soupy Sales) in the 1980s. They had two children together: Anthony Tyrone Sales (born 1982) and Valentina Fox Sales (born 1983).

Power married William Greendeer and with him had a fourth child, Stella Greendeer, on April 21, 1996.

Taryn Power died from leukemia on June 26, 2020, after a 4 1/2-year battle against the disease.

== Filmography ==
Film
Year	Film	Role	Notes
1972	María	María	
1974	Un Viaje de locos	Fedora	
1975	The Count of Monte Cristo	Valentine De Villefort	
1976	Tracks	Stephanie	
1976	House of Pleasure for Women	Olimpia	Alternative title: Bordella
1977	Sinbad and the Eye of the Tiger	Dione	Alternative title: Sinbad at the World's End
1984	The Sea Serpent	Margaret	Alternative title: Serpiente de Mar
1990	Eating	Anita	
Television
Year	Title	Role	Notes
1977	The Hardy Boys/Nancy Drew Mysteries	Helene Holstead	1 episode
1985	Matt Houston	Deborah	1 episode

== Award nominations ==
Year	Award	Result	Category	Film
1978	Saturn Award	Nominated	Best Actress - Fantasy	Sinbad and the Eye of the Tiger
