= The Eye of God (film) =

1916 film by Phillips Smalley

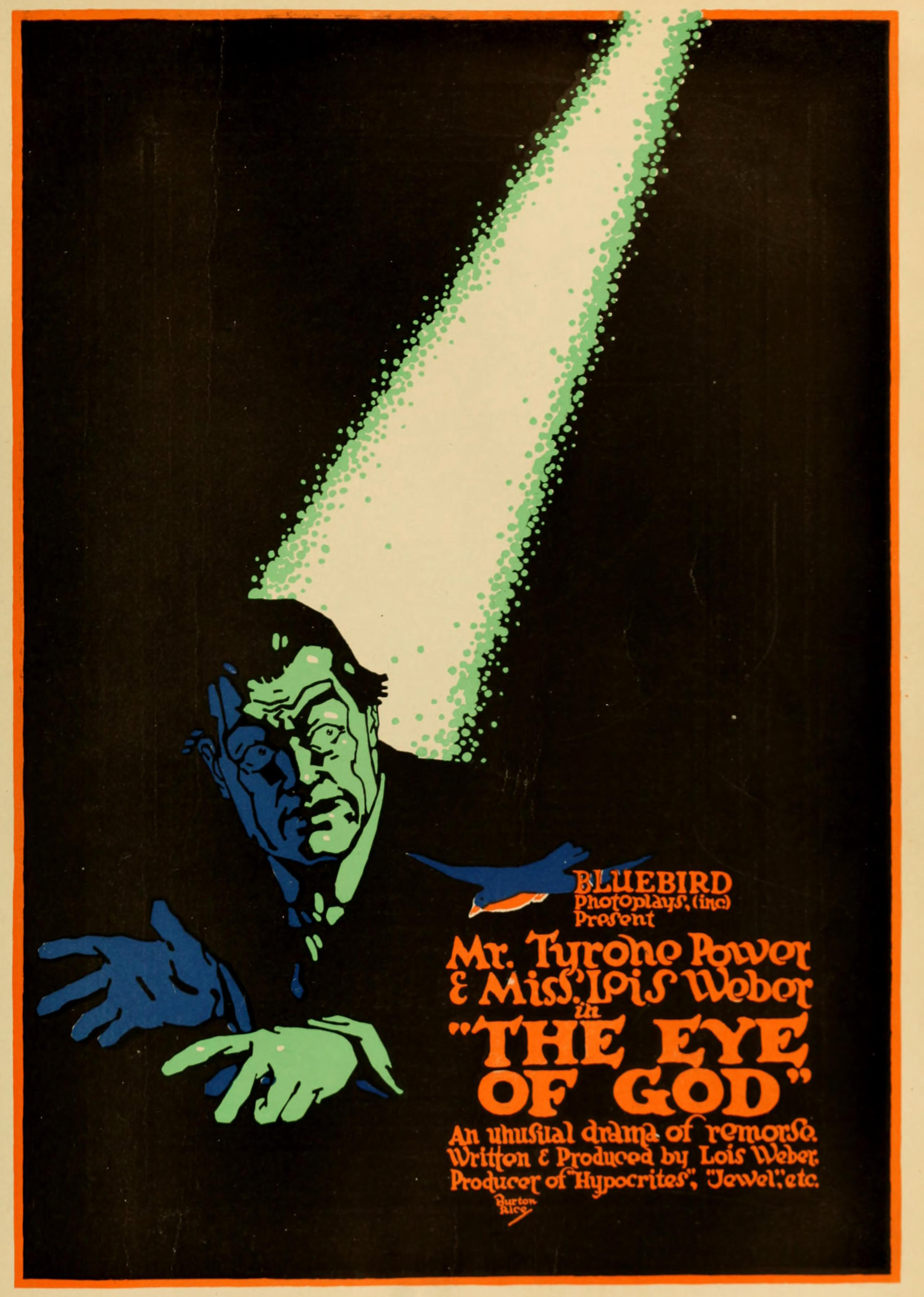
- Film poster
- Directed by: Phillips Smalley; Lois Weber
- Written by: Lois Weber
- Produced by: Bluebird Photoplays
- Starring: Tyrone Power Sr. Ethel Weber
- Cinematography: Stephen S. Norton; Allen G. Siegler
- Distributed by: Bluebird; Universal Film Manufacturing Company
- Release date: June 5, 1916
- Running time: 5 reels
- Country: United States
- Language: Silent (English intertitles)

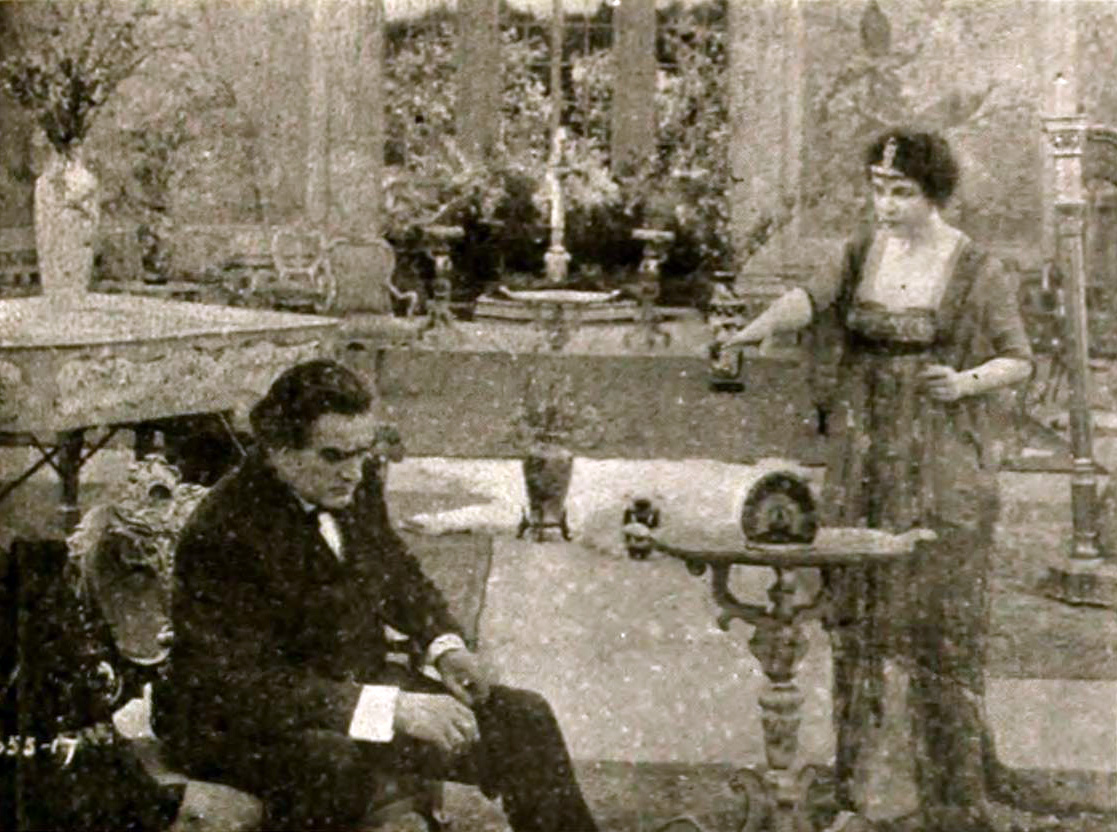
scene in the movie

The Eye of God is a lost 1916 American silent mystery film directed by Phillips Smalley and Lois Weber and written by Weber. It starred Tyrone Power Sr. and Ethel Weber, Lois's sister. It was produced by Bluebird Photoplays and released by them and by Universal Film Manufacturing Company.

== Cast ==
- Tyrone Power Sr. as Olaf
- Ethel Weber as Ana
- Lois Weber as Renie
- Charles Gunn as Paul
