= Where Are My Children? =

1916 film by Lois Weber, Phillips Smalley

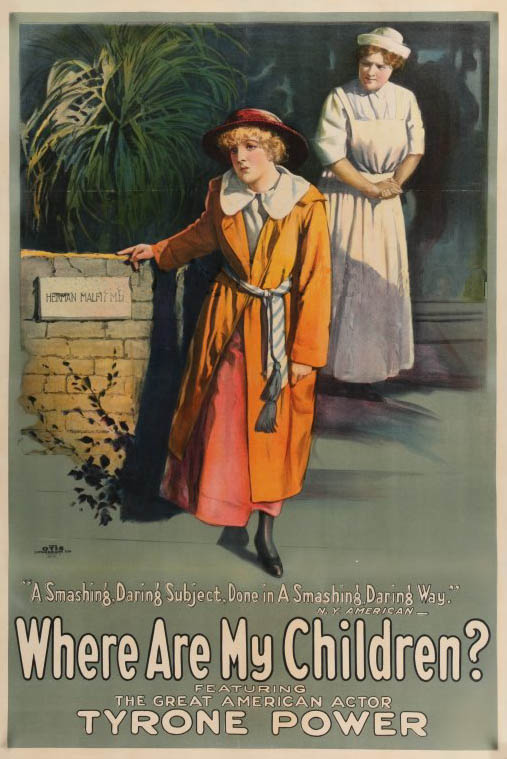
- Theatrical release poster
- Directed by: Phillips Smalley (uncredited); Lois Weber (uncredited)
- Written by: Lois Weber; Phillips Smalley
- Story by: Lucy Payton; Franklin Hall
- Produced by: Phillips Smalley; Lois Weber
- Starring: Tyrone Power Sr. A.D. Blake; Marjorie Blynn; Juan de la Cruz
- Cinematography: Stephen S. Norton (uncredited); Allen G. Siegler (uncredited)
- Production company: Lois Weber Productions
- Distributed by: Universal Film Manufacturing Company
- Release date: May 1916
- Running time: 62 minutes
- Country: United States
- Languages: Silent; English intertitles

Where Are My Children? is a 1916 American silent drama film directed by Phillips Smalley and Lois Weber and stars Tyrone Power Sr., Juan de la Cruz, Helen Riaume, Marie Walcamp, Cora Drew, A.D. Blake, Rene Rogers, William Haben and C. Norman Hammond. The film tells the story of a district attorney (Power Sr.) who, while prosecuting a doctor for illegal abortions, finds out that society people, including his wife, used the doctor's services.

== Plot ==
Where Are My Children? (1916)

Richard Walton, a district attorney, is presented with an obscenity case: A medical practitioner, Dr. Homer, has been arrested for distributing 'indecent' birth control literature. On the stand, Dr. Homer makes a strong case for legalizing contraception. He recounts three incidents from his medical practice, each shown in a brief flashback: children are exposed to violent abuse in a family riddled with alcoholism; an impoverished family is unable to provide adequate medical care for their sick children; and a single mother, abandoned by her male lover, commits suicide with her young infant.

Meanwhile, Richard's wife, Edith, has been keeping a secret from him for many years: she has been seeing a doctor, one Herman Malfit, who performs abortions so that her busy social life will not be interrupted by the inconvenience of pregnancy. She suggests it as an option for her friend Mrs. William Carlo, who is with child. Mrs. Carlo has the abortion.

The Waltons receive two new guests in their house almost simultaneously: Edith Walton's ne'er-do-well younger brother, and their maid's young daughter, Lillian. Smitten by the brother's advances, the maid's daughter is seduced and soon finds herself pregnant. She is taken to Dr. Malfit and then abandoned by the boy after the operation goes wrong. Making her way back to the Walton mansion, she collapses and dies from the botched abortion.

Following Malfit's arrest and trial, Richard Walton examines the doctor's ledgers and realized that his wife and many of her friends are listed as having received 'personal services.' He returns home, furious, to find them lunching at his home. He banishes his wife's friends, saying 'I should bring you to trial for manslaughter!' and confronts Edith with the cry, 'where are my children?' She is overcome with remorse. As the years pass, the couple must contend with a lonely, childless life, full of longing for the family they might have had.

== Cast ==
- Tyrone Power Sr. as District Attorney Richard Walton (as Mr. Tyrone Power)
- Mrs. Tyrone Power as Mrs. Richard Walton (as Helen Riaume)
- Marie Walcamp as Mrs. William Carlo
- Cora Drew as Walton's Housekeeper
- Rena Rogers as Lillian - Housekeeper's Daughter
- A.D. Blake as Roger - Mrs. Walton's Brother
- Juan de la Cruz as Dr. Herman Malfit
- C. Norman Hammond as Dr. William Homer
- William J. Hope as Richard's Brother-in-Law - a Eugenic Husband
- Marjorie Blynn as Richard's Sister - a Eugenic Wife
- William Haben as Dr. Gilding
- George Berrell as Judge (uncredited)
- Mary MacLaren as Walton's Maid (uncredited)
- Andy MacLennan as Man on Street (uncredited)
- Anne Power as Infant (uncredited)

== Themes ==
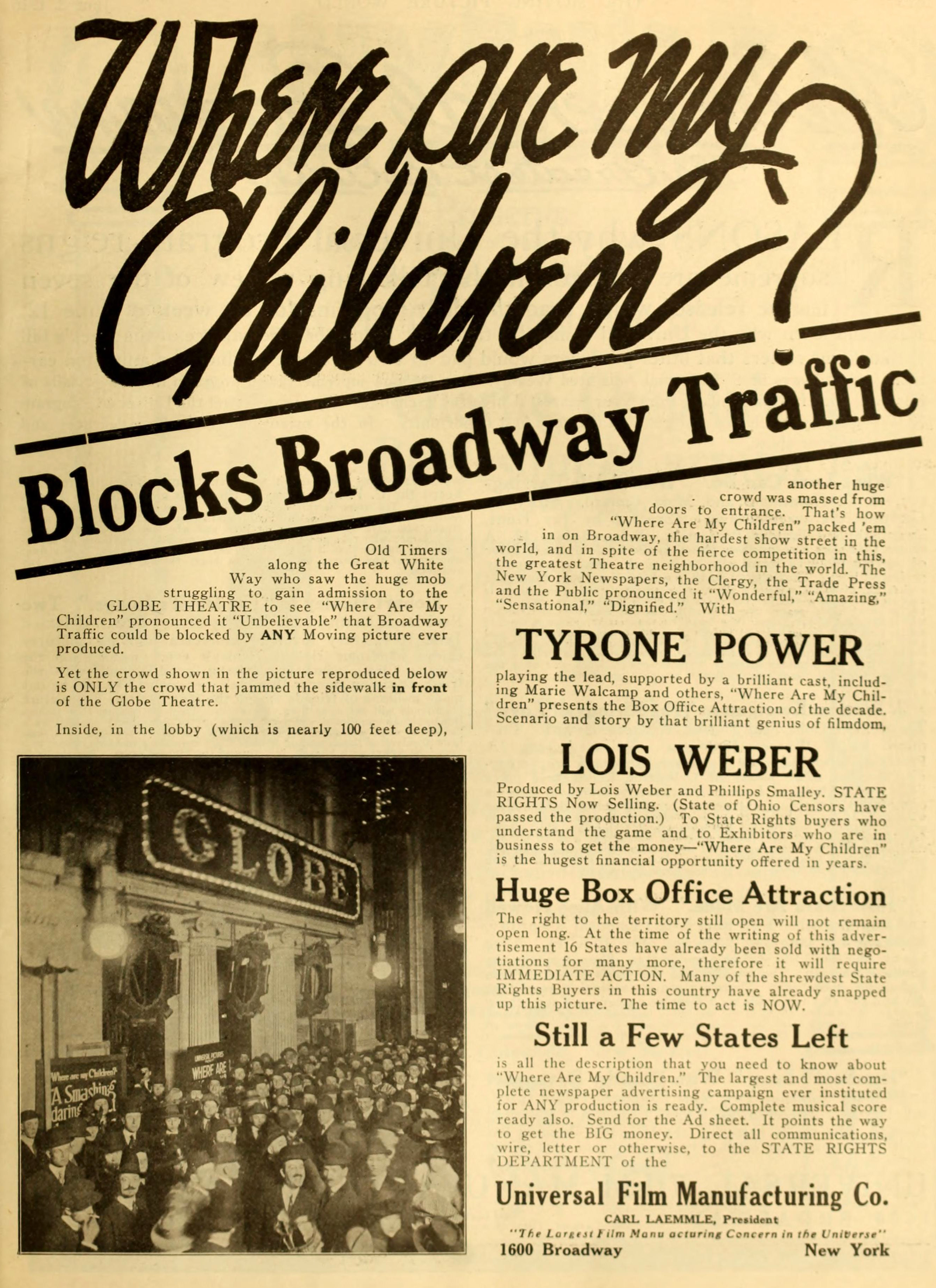
Advertisement

The film was inspired by the 1914 obscenity case of Margaret Sanger in New York in which she was prosecuted for distributing information about birth control through the U.S. postal system. This had been made illegal by the 1873 Comstock Act, which defined birth control as obscene. It stands as one of the best surviving examples of Lois Weber's social problem films.

Eugenics and family planning are discussed didactically in the film, and examples of desirable or undesirable children (the results of good or bad breeding respectively) are shown.

While the film presents an argument for birth control, it takes a firm stance against abortion, portraying the wealthy women as procuring abortions on a whim when pregnancy threatens to interfere with their social lives. Some critics and scholars argue that the film frames abortion in moralistic and eugenic terms, showing it as socially destructive and morally wrong, especially when sought out by wealthy women, rather than treating it neutrally. At the time Weber made the film, 'back alley' and 'illegal' abortions were prevalent and quite often resulted in destroying women's ability to have future children. It is left clear at the film's end Mrs. Walton can no longer have children because her body is damaged by a long-term overindulgence in abortions.

== Production ==
The film was written by Lucy Payton, Franklin Hall, Lois Weber and Phillips Smalley. No director is credited. Future star Mary MacLaren made her debut in this film playing the Walton's younger maid. Shooting took place in the Los Angeles area, and at the Universal studio facilities in Hollywood. The Waltons are played by Tyrone Power Sr. and Helen Riaume, who at the time were real life husband and wife. Anne Power, their daughter, has a small role.

The film makes use of several trick photography scenes, with an emphasis on multiple exposures to convey information or emotions visually. This is especially evident in the final scene of the film. As a recurring motif, every time a character becomes pregnant, a child's face is double exposed over their shoulder.

Weber returned to the topic of birth control the following year, with a film called The Hand That Rocks the Cradle, in which she plays the principal role of Louise Broome, a birth control advocate imprisoned for her work.

== Reception ==
The film was widely viewed in the U.S. and made Lois Weber popular. It did well in New York City and in Manhattan, after a court case was dismissed and the film was allowed to be exhibited. In Atlantic City, the film played to packed houses. Critics praised the film for its delicate handling of sensitive subject matter and attention to detail and dramatic qualities. However, in Pennsylvania, the film was banned, even after several edited submissions to the censors. They felt that it was filth and no amount of editing could make the film fit for decent people to see.

== Preservation ==
In 1993, the film was selected for preservation in the United States National Film Registry by the Library of Congress as being "culturally, historically, or aesthetically significant". A 2000 DVD release featured a reconstructed piano score written and performed by Martin Marks. A 2007 DVD release featured full orchestration of the Marks score, as arranged by Allen Feinstein, and expert audio commentary by film historian Shelley Stamp. A 2018 DVD/Blu-ray release featured a new piano score by Maud Nelissen.
