= Tyrone Guthrie =

English actor and director (1900–1971)

Sir Tyrone Guthrie
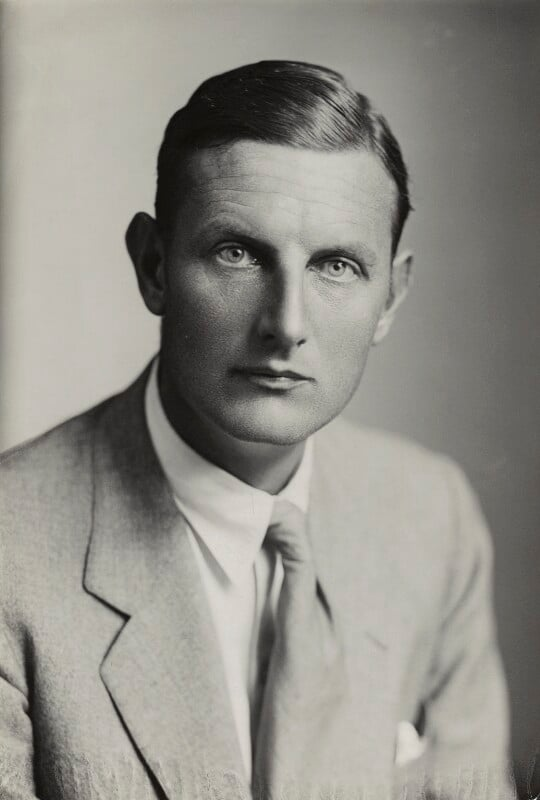
- Guthrie in 1947

4th Chancellor of the Queen's University Belfast
- In office 1963–1970
- Preceded by: 1st Viscount Alanbrooke
- Succeeded by: Lord Ashby of Brandon

Personal details
- Born: William Tyrone Guthrie; 2 July 1900 Tunbridge Wells, Kent, England
- Died: 15 May 1971 (aged 70) Newbliss, County Monaghan, Ireland
- Spouse: Judith Bretherton (m. 1931)
- Education: Oxford University
- Occupation: Theatrical director

Sir William Tyrone Guthrie (2 July 1900 – 15 May 1971) was an English theatrical director instrumental in the founding of the Stratford Festival of Canada, the Guthrie Theater in Minneapolis, Minnesota, and the Tyrone Guthrie Centre at his family's ancestral home, Annaghmakerrig, near Newbliss in County Monaghan, Ireland. He is famous for his original approach to Shakespearean and modern drama.

== Early life ==
Guthrie was born on 2 July 1900 in Tunbridge Wells, Kent, England, the son of Dr. Thomas Clement Guthrie (a grandson of the Scottish preacher Thomas Guthrie) and Norah Power. His mother was the daughter of Sir William James Tyrone Power, Commissary-General-in-chief of the British Army from 1863 to 1869 and Martha, daughter of Dr. John Moorhead of Annaghmakerrig House and his Philadelphia-born wife, Susan (née Allibone) Humphreys.

His great-grandfather was Irish actor Tyrone Power and he was a second cousin of famed film actor Tyrone Power. Guthrie's sister, Susan Margaret, married his close university friend, fellow Anglo-Irishman Hubert Butler. Tyrone Guthrie received a degree in history at Oxford University, where he was active in student theatre, and worked for a season at the newly established Oxford Playhouse.

== Career ==
In the early 1920s, Guthrie became director of the Scottish National Players based at the Lyric Theatre in Glasgow, but his tenure was cut short by personal circumstances.

In 1924 he joined the BBC as a broadcaster and began to produce plays for radio. This led to a year directing for the stage with the Scottish National Players, before returning to the BBC to become one of the first writers to create plays designed for radio performance. From 1929 to 1933, he directed at various theatres, including the Cambridge Festival Theatre in 1929 and a production of Pirandello's Six Characters in Search of an Author at the Westminster Theatre in 1932. His work in London at the Old Vic and the Sadler’s Wells theatres earned him acknowledgment as a significant director.

During 1933–34, and again from 1936 to 1945, he was director of the Shakespeare Repertory Company. While in Montreal, Guthrie produced the Romance of Canada series of radio plays for recalling epic moments in Canadian history. The series was broadcast on the Canadian National Railway radio network. Hubert Butler translated the text for Guthrie's 1934 production of Anton Chekhov's Cherry Orchard, for perhaps its first English-language production. In the late 1930s, he worked in London and appeared in the first two motion pictures produced by Charles Laughton's independent film production company, Mayflower Pictures. The films were Vessel of Wrath and St. Martin's Lane, both released in 1938.

In the 1940s Guthrie began to direct operas, to critical acclaim, including a realistic Carmen at Sadler's Wells and the Metropolitan Opera in New York. He also returned to Scotland where he produced Robert Kemp's adaptation of Joseph Mitchell's Highland Fair at the first Edinburgh International Festival in August 1947. For the second Edinburgh Festival in 1948, with James Bridie, he staged the first modern adaptation, by Robert Kemp, of Sir David Lyndsay's grand-scale medieval comedy Ane Satyre of the Thrie Estaitis; a landmark event in the modern revival of Scottish theatre. It was staged in the city's General Assembly Hall of the Church of Scotland on the Mound, specially adapted for the occasion. He directed the play again in Edinburgh in 1959.

=== Stratford Festival of Canada ===
In 1952, he was invited to help launch the Stratford Festival of Canada. Intrigued with the idea of starting a Shakespeare theatre in a remote Canadian location, he enlisted Tanya Moiseiwitsch to further develop his thrust stage design, successfully improvised in Edinburgh, and actors Alec Guinness and Irene Worth to star in the inaugural production of Richard III. All performances in the first seasons took place in a large tent on the banks of the Avon River. He remained as Artistic Director for three seasons, and his work at Stratford had a strong influence in the development of Canadian theatre.

Guthrie produced Gilbert and Sullivan's H.M.S. Pinafore in 1960 and The Pirates of Penzance in 1961, which were televised in Canada and also brought to the Phoenix Theatre in New York and on tour in the US. In 1962, as soon as the Gilbert and Sullivan copyrights expired, he brought these productions to Britain; they soon played at Her Majesty's Theatre and were broadcast by the BBC. They were among the first Savoy opera productions in Britain not authorized by the D'Oyly Carte Opera Company.

=== Guthrie Theater in Minneapolis, Minnesota ===
In 1963, he founded the Guthrie Theater in Minneapolis, Minnesota, designed by Ralph Rapson. He published a small invitation in 1959 in the drama page of The New York Times soliciting communities' interest and involvement in a resident theater. From that beginning, the Twin Cities was chosen and the Guthrie Theater was established, with construction being completed in 1963. Guthrie served as Artistic Director until 1966, and continued to direct at the theater he founded until 1969, two years before his death.

=== Legacy ===
In the prologue to his biography, James Forsyth wrote, "Anti-Broadway, anti-West End, anti everything implied in the term 'Legitimate Theatre', he ended up with a legitimate claim to the title of 'most important, British-born theatre director of his time'". Sir Peter Hall wrote, "Among the great originators in British Theatre...Guthrie was a towering figure in every sense. He blazed a trail for the subsidised theatre of the sixties. He showed how to run a company and administer a theatre. And he was a brilliant and at times great director..." Guthrie wrote two major books about the creation of effective drama: Theatre Prospect (1932) and A Life in the Theatre (1959).

Guthrie's autobiography, A Life in the Theatre, was adapted into a stage play, Guthrie on Guthrie by Margaret Dale. It was produced at the Stratford Festival in 1989, and again at the Glenn Gould Studio in 1998 for recording as an audiobook. Both productions featured Colin Fox as Guthrie.

=== Queen's University Belfast ===
He was Chancellor of Queen's University Belfast (1963–70). On 15 September 2010, a blue plaque in his memory was unveiled at the BBC in Belfast by the Ulster History Circle.

== Personal life ==
In 1931, Guthrie married Judith Bretherton, who survived him by only a year. He was knighted in 1961, and died a decade later at his home, Annaghmakerrig, in Newbliss, County Monaghan, Ireland, on 15 May 1971, aged 70, from a heart attack. His body was buried in the graveyard of Aghabog Church of Ireland, in Newbliss.

== Bibliography ==
- The Production of King Oedipus (2022). Tyrone Guthrie. Wordville
- Forsyth, James (1976). Tyrone Guthrie. London: Hamish Hamilton. ISBN 978-0-241-89471-2.
- Guthrie, Tyrone (1932). Theatre Prospect. London: Wishart. OCLC 1903289.
- Guthrie, Tyrone; Davies, Robertson; Macdonald, Grant (1953). Renown at Stratford; A Record of the Shakespeare Festival in Canada, 1953. Toronto: Clark, Irwin. OCLC 6122929.
- Guthrie, Tyrone (1959). A Life in the Theatre. New York: McGraw-Hill. OCLC 331308.
- Guthrie, Tyrone (1964). A New Theatre. New York: McGraw-Hill. OCLC 331078.
- Guthrie, Tyrone (1965). In Various Directions. New York: Macmillan. OCLC 711657.
- Guthrie, Tyrone (1971). Tyrone Guthrie on Acting. New York: Viking Press. ISBN 0-670-73832-8.
- Rossi, Alfred (1970). Minneapolis Rehearsals: Tyrone Guthrie Directs Hamlet. Berkeley: University of California Press. ISBN 0-520-01719-6.
- Rossi, Alfred (1977). Astonish Us in the Morning: Tyrone Guthrie Remembered. London: Hutchinson. ISBN 0-09-128860-6.

== See also ==
- Guthrie Theater production history

Academic offices
| Preceded by Field Marshal the Viscount Alanbrooke | Chancellor of Queen's University Belfast; 1963–1970 | Succeeded by Lord Ashby of Brandon |
