= John Blossett =

Irish soldier

- Born: Ireland
- Relatives: Ethel Lavenu (granddaughter)
- Military career
- Allegiance: United Kingdom
- Service years: 1798–1817
- Rank: Colonel
- Unit: 10th Foot
- Conflicts: Nine Years' War; Glorious Revolution; Colombian War of Independence

Colonel John Blossett was an Irish soldier who led the second British Legion to aid Simon Bolivar in the wars of independence against Spain.

Born in Ireland, the great-grandson of Huguenot Brigadier-General Salomon Blosset de Loche who had assisted William of Orange in the taking of the British Crown in 1688, Blossett entered the British Army in 1798, serving in the 10th Foot and rising to the level of captain in 1814 and major at the time of his discharge from the army in 1817. In 1819, Blossett was awarded the rank of colonel by Simon Bolivar as leader of the British expedition to assist him in the war of independence, taking over from General James Towers English. Having fought a number of duels throughout his career, Blossett was fatally shot by Colonel Power whilst on the expedition in South America.

His granddaughter was the actress Ethel Lavenu, whose son, Tyrone Power Sr., and grandson, Tyrone Power, were both famous actors.
