= Juan de la Cruz (actor) =

Danish actor and singer

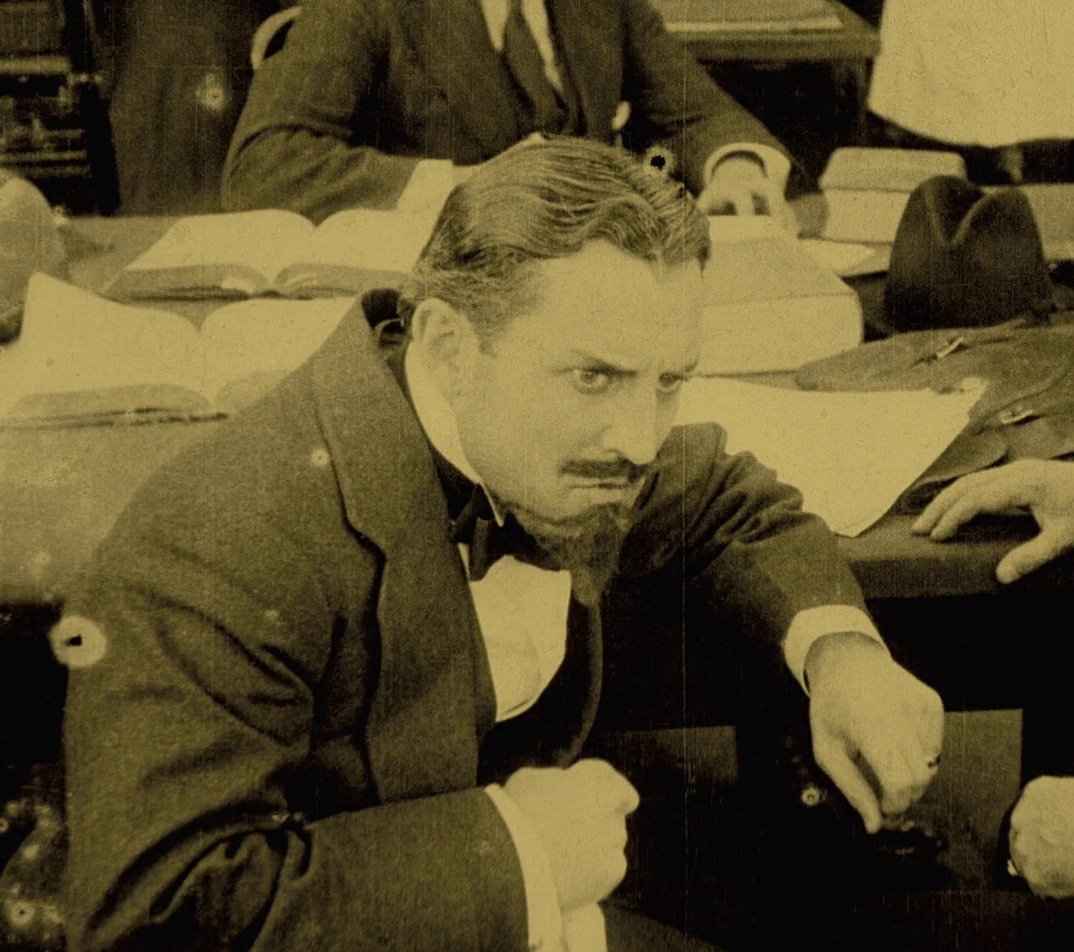
- Juan de la Cruz in Where Are My Children? (1916)
- Born: Juan de la Cruz de Morety; 4 June 1881; Copenhagen, Denmark
- Died: 12 November 1953 (aged 72); Orange County, California, USA
- Education: Copenhagen College
- Occupation: Actor
- Spouse: Vera Eyton (div.)

Juan de la Cruz (born Juan de la Cruz de Morety; 4 June 1881 – 12 November 1953) was a Danish actor and singer of Spanish descent who appeared in Hollywood films from the 1910s through the 1950s.

== Biography ==
Juan was born in Copenhagen to Alexander Philomeno de la Cruz de Morety and Marie Grishauge Jepson. He attended Copenhagen College and then studied music at the Royal Danish Theatre.

Originally a singer and stage actor in his native Copenhagen, de la Cruz moved to Hollywood around 1912. He was reportedly of noble descent, and was referred to in books published at the time as Count de Morety.

== Selected filmography ==
- The Spanish Main (1945)
- Delinquent Daughters (1944)
- Shake Hands with Murder (1944)
- Miss V from Moscow (1942)
- Meet the Wildcat (1940)
- Suzy (1936)
- Magnificent Obsession (1935)
- Wolfe and Montcalm (1924)
- Food for Scandal (1920)
- For the Soul of Rafael (1920)
- Pegeen (1920)
- An Adventure in Hearts (1919)
- A Gentleman's Agreement (1918)
- The House of Lies (1916)
- The Making of Maddalena (1916)
- The Woman Who Followed Me (1916)
- The Purple Maze (1916)
- Where Are My Children? (1916)
- The Voice of the Tempter (1916)
- The League of the Future (1916)
- The Flirt (1917)
- Hop: The Devil's Brew (1916)
- Discontent (1916)
- Lord John's Journal (1915)
- The Gentleman from Indiana (1915)
- Peer Gynt (1915)
- The Lorelei Madonna (1915)
- The Spark from the Embers (1915)
