= Hector Theophilus de Cramahé =

Canadian politician

Hector Theophilus de Cramahé (1 October 1720 – 9 June 1788), born Théophile Hector Chateigner de Cramahé, was Lieutenant-Governor of the Province of Quebec, and titular Lieutenant Governor of Detroit.

He was born in Dublin, the son of a Huguenot, Captain Hector François Chataigner de Cramahé, Seigneur de Cramahé et des Rochers. His father served as aide de camp to the leader of William III's Huguenot regiments, Henri de Massue, 1st Earl of Galway.

He began his military career in 1740 and in January 1741, was appointed an ensign in the 15th Regiment of Foot and with the rank of lieutenant in April. On 12 March 1754 he became captain and in 1758 went with his regiment to America where it took part in the Siege of Louisbourg.

During the absence of General Guy Carleton, on 6 June 1771, he was made lieutenant governor of the Province of Quebec. His administration ending with the return of Carleton on 18 September 1774. He, along with Henry Caldwell, organised the defence of the city during the Battle of Quebec (1775).

In 1778, he participated in the enslavement of Bell, a girl who had escaped twice.

He held the title of lieutenant governor until April 1782 through much of the American War of Independence. In 1786 he was appointed lieutenant governor of Detroit.

He died at his residence near Exeter in Devon, England. He left his name to Cramahe Township in southern Ontario.

== See also ==
- American Revolutionary War
- Former colonies and territories in Canada
- Invasion of Quebec (1775)
- Irish Quebecers
- Lower Canada
- Province of Quebec (1763–1791)
