= Ethel Lavenu =

British actress (1842–1917)

- Lavenu in The Duke's Motto, performed at the Royal Lyceum Theatre, London in 1863
- Born: Eliza Lavenu; March 1842; Chelsea, London, England
- Died: 14 August 1917 (aged 75); Middlesex, England
- Spouse: Harold Littledale Power
- Children: George Arthur; Frederick Tyrone Edmond
- Parents: Lewis Henry Lavenu; Julia Blossett
- Relatives: Col. John Blossett (maternal grandfather); Tyrone Power (grandson)

Ethel Lavenu (born Eliza Lavenu; 1842 – 14 August 1917) was a British stage actress. She was the mother of stage and silent film actor Tyrone Power Sr., and the grandmother of the Hollywood film star Tyrone Power.

== Early life ==
Born in March 1842 in Chelsea, the third of six daughters of the cellist, composer, and music impresario Lewis Henry Lavenu by his wife Julia, daughter of Col. John Blossett, head of the British expedition to assist Simon Bolivar in the war of independence in Venezuela. Her father was often away on tour, and in 1855 left for Sydney leaving the family in London.

== Career ==
In 1861 Ethel was living with her mother at 128, Long Acre, Covent Garden, she, her elder sister Ada, and younger sister Alice were all listed as Professional, and her youngest sister Bessie was also later to become an actress. She had more success than her sisters, by 1863 appearing in various plays at the Royal Lyceum Theatre, London. In 1866, she married Harold Littledale Power, the youngest son of the Irish actor Tyrone Power. She had two sons, George Arthur, born in 1868, an actor, known as Littledale Power, who later appeared on Broadway, and Frederick Tyrone Edmond, known as Tyrone Power Sr.

== Stage appearances ==
- The Duke's Motto (with Kate Terry, sister of Ellen Terry), January, 1863, Theatre Royal Lyceum.
- A Day After The Fair, March, 1864, Royal Lyceum Theatre.
- Bel Demonio, March, 1864 with Kate Terry, Royal Lyceum Theatre.
- Nursey Chickweed, December, 1865, Royal Lyceum Theatre.
- The Master of Ravenswood, May, 1866, Royal Lyceum Theatre.
- The Corsican Brothers, June, 1866, Royal Lyceum Theatre.
