= Tyrone Power (Irish actor) =

Irish actor, author (1797–1841)

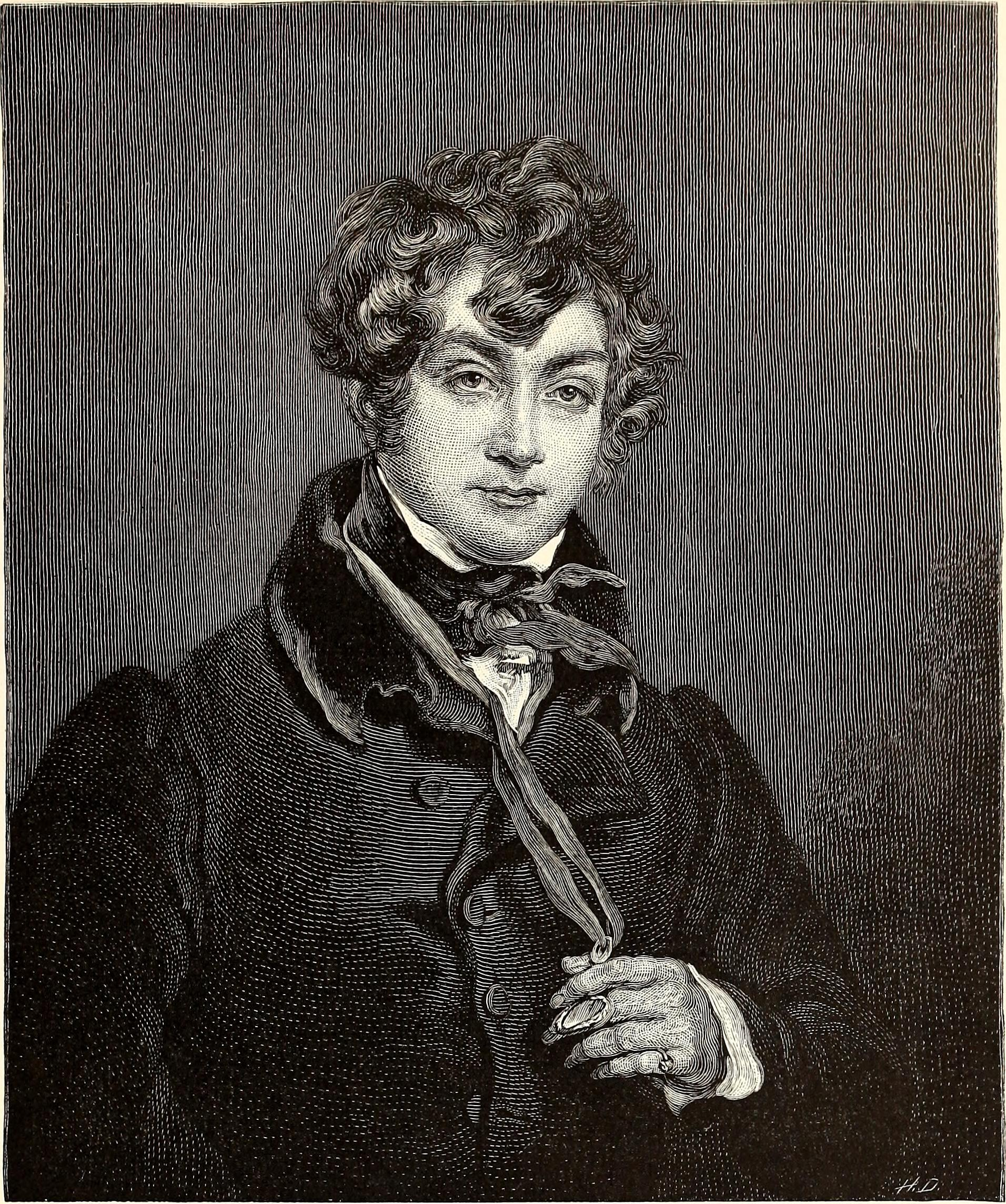
- Tyrone Power c. 1840
- Born: William Grattan Tyrone Power; 20 November 1797; Kilmacthomas, County Waterford, Ireland
- Died: 17 March 1841 (aged 43); North Atlantic Ocean
- Spouse: Anne Gilbert
- Children: 6, including William

William Grattan Tyrone Power (20 November 1797 – 17 March 1841), known professionally as Tyrone Power, was an Irish stage actor, comedian, author and theatrical manager. He was an ancestor of the American actors Tyrone Power Sr. and Tyrone Power and is also referred to as Tyrone Power I.

== Early life ==
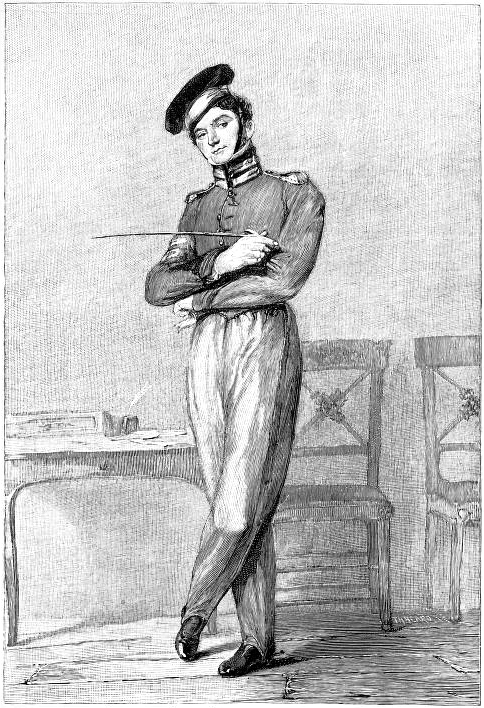
Tyrone Power as Corporal O'Conor

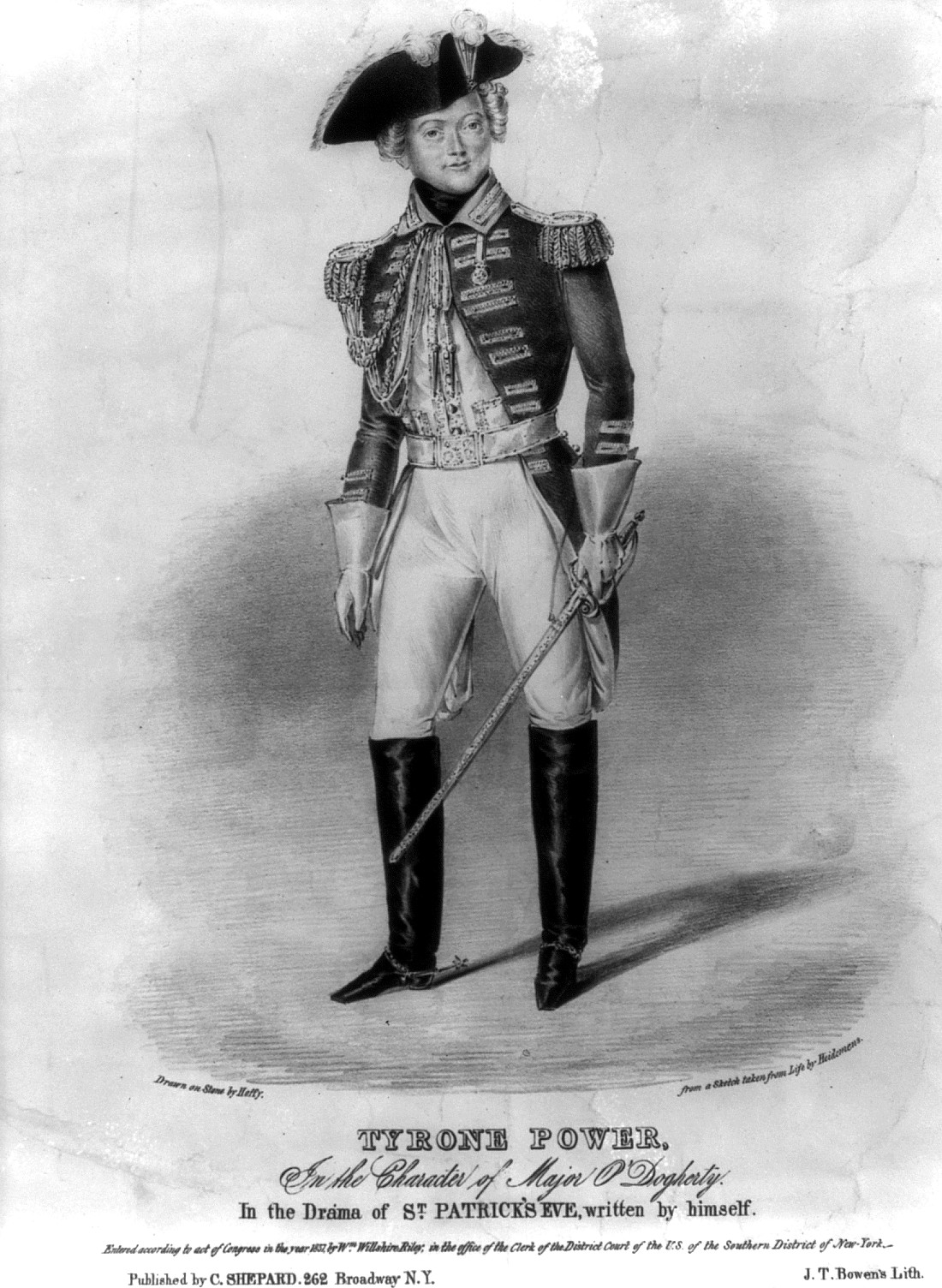
Power as Major O'Dogherty in the drama St. Patrick's Eve, 1837

Born in Kilmacthomas, County Waterford, Ireland, Power was the son of Tyrone Power, reported to be “a minstrel of sorts”, by his marriage to Maria Maxwell, whose father had been killed while serving in the British Army during the American Revolutionary War. His father was related to the Powers who were of the Anglo-Irish landed gentry and to George de la Poer Beresford, 1st Marquess of Waterford.

In 1833, Power was a passenger on a train traveling from South Amboy, New Jersey on the Camden & Amboy Railroad when it broke an axle in Hightstown, New Jersey and derailed. Power was the only one of the 24 passengers not seriously hurt, suffering only minor injuries, and he helped a surgeon treat the injured passengers. He said of the accident that it was "the most dreadful catastrophe that ever my eyes beheld."

== Career ==
The young Power took to the stage, achieving prominence throughout the world as an actor and manager. His major break came when fellow Irishman Charles Connor died of apoplexy in 1826, and he took over many of his stage Irish parts. He was well known for acting in such Irish-themed plays as Catherine Gore's King O'Neil (1835), his own St. Patrick's Eve (1837), Samuel Lover's Rory O'More (1837) and The White Horse of the Peppers (1838), Anna Maria Hall's The Groves of Blarney (1838), Eugene Macarthy's Charles O'Malley (1838) (see Charles Lever), and Bayle Bernard's His Last Legs (1839) and The Irish Attorney (1840). In his discussion of these works, Richard Allen Cave has argued that Power, both in his acting as well as his choice of plays, sought to rehabilitate the Irishman from the derogatory associations with "stage Irishmen" ("Staging the Irishman" in Acts of Supremacy [1991]).

== Family tree ==
Power had a number of notable descendants by his wife Anne, daughter of John Gilbert of the Isle of Wight: Anne Power is buried in the churchyard of St Mary The Virgin Church in High Halden, Kent, England.

- Sir William James Murray Tyrone Power (1819–1911) Commissary General in Chief of the British Army and briefly Agent-General for New Zealand.
  - Norah Power, who married Dr. Thomas Guthrie
    - Sir Tyrone Guthrie British theatrical director (1900–1971).
- Maurice Henry Anthony O'Reilly Power (1821–1849) trained as a barrister but later took up acting.
- Frederick Augustus Dobbyn Nugent Power (1823–1896), civil engineer, left a large estate of £197,000, equivalent to £15.6 million or 28 million US dollars in 2006.
- Clara Elizabeth Murray Power (born 1825)
- Mary Jane Power (born 1827)
- Harold Littledale Power (1833–1901) actor, wine merchant, mine agent & engineer.
  - Tyrone Power Sr. (1869–1931), English theatre and silent movie star.
    - Tyrone Power (1914–1958), American Hollywood star of the 1930s to 1950s. Did not use Tyrone Power III as his screen name.
      - Romina Power (born 1951), American singer and film actress.
      - Taryn Power (1953–2020), film actress.
      - Tyrone Power Jr. (born 1959) American film actor. Did not use Tyrone Power IV as his screen name.

== Death ==
Tyrone Power was lost at sea in March 1841, when the SS President disappeared without trace in the North Atlantic.

== See also ==
- List of people who disappeared mysteriously at sea

== Published works ==
- Born to Good Luck: or the Irishman's Fortune. A farce in two acts. Adapted from "False and True".
- How to Pay the Rent; a farce, in one act [and in prose]
- St. Patrick's Eve; or the Order of the Day. A drama in three acts [and in prose]
- The Lost Heir and The Prediction (1830)
- The King's Secret (1831)
- The Gipsy of the Abruzzo. (1831)
- Impressions of America, during the years 1833, 1834 and 1835. (1836)
