= Tyrone Power Sr. =

English-born American stage and screen actor (1869–1931)

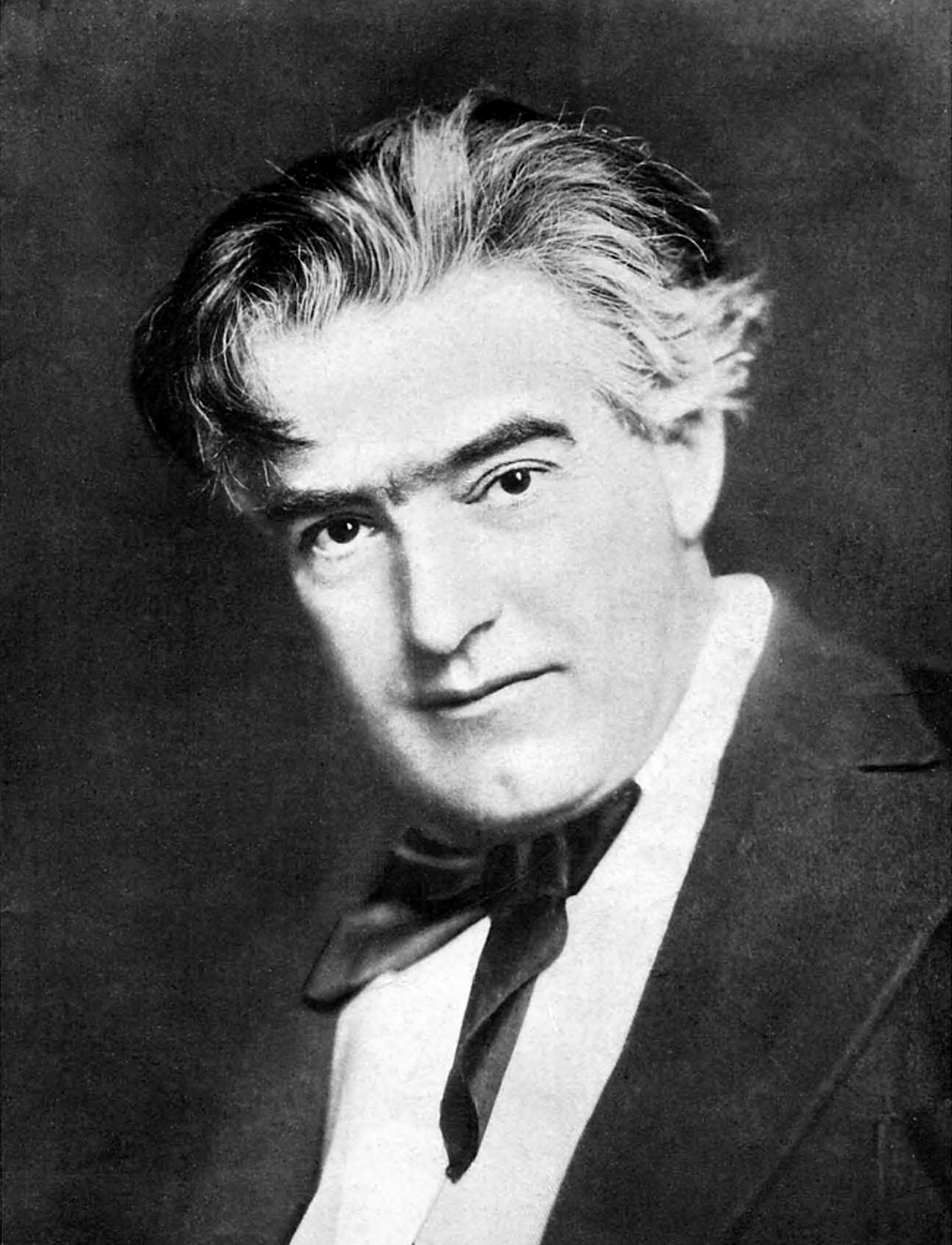
- Power in 1916
- Born: Frederick Tyrone Edmond Power; 2 May 1869; London, England
- Died: 23 December 1931 (aged 62); Los Angeles, California, US
- Other name: Frederick Power
- Education: Dover College
- Spouse(s): Maud White (unknown marriage date) Edith Crane (m. 1898; died 1912) Helen Emma Reaume (m. 1912; div. 1920) Bertha Knight (m. 1921; died 1927)
- Children: 2, including Tyrone Power
- Mother: Ethel Lavenu
- Relatives: William Grattan Tyrone Power (grandfather)

Frederick Tyrone Edmond Power Sr. (2 May 1869 – 23 December 1931) was an English-born American stage and screen actor, known professionally as Tyrone Power. He is now usually referred to as Tyrone Power Sr. to differentiate him from his son, actor Tyrone Power. He was thrice widowed.

== Early life ==
Power was born in London in 1869, the son of Harold Littledale Power and Ethel Lavenu. Harold had worked as a singer and actor before his marriage, most notably in Edmund Yates' production Invitations at the Egyptian Hall, London, 1862–63. Turning to business, he became a wine merchant, later collaborating in the mining business with his brother Frederick Power. Harold was the youngest son of the Irish actor Tyrone Power, from whom his son, grandson and great grandson would later take their stage names. Harold's wife Ethel was an actress and the third daughter of conductor and composer Lewis Henry Lavenu.

Frederick Power, as he was then known, was educated at Hampton School then Dover College with his brother George, who would later accompany him on tour in America as Littledale Power. In 1883 at the age of 14 he was sent from Britain to Florida by his parents to learn citrus planting.

== Career ==
=== Stage ===
After a couple of years Power ran away from his farm work and joined a theatre stock company at St. Augustine, Florida, debuting as Gibson in Charles Hawtrey's The Private Secretary on 29 November 1886, aged 17. Power steadily moved up the ranks in a variety of roles mainly Shakespearean parts. In 1899, he was in the cast of Mrs. Fiske's Becky Sharp which costarred Maurice Barrymore. 1902 saw Power join Mrs. Fiske again in Mary of Magdala. The following year Power starred opposite Edgar Selwyn in Ulysses. (Selwyn would later join part of his name with Samuel Goldfish's name to create Goldwyn Studios.) Power also had roles in Julia Marlowe's When Knighthood Was in Flower in a 1904 revival.

In August 1905, Power appeared at the Elitch Theatre in Denver with his wife, Edith Crane, in Tess of the d'Urbervilles. According to Mary Elitch Long in her autobiography Lady of the Gardens, "I shall never forget the beauty of his voice nor his first utterance as he entered the Gardens: 'I am about to realize a great ambition, and that is to play in the Elitch Gardens Theatre.'"

In 1908, Power had what was probably his greatest personal theatrical success, The Servant in the House. The production ran for 80 performances in the first half of 1908 and then a return engagement for 48 performances near the close of the year. Following this success, Power appeared in a few more original stage productions like Chu Chin Chow (American version) and The Wandering Jew. The rest of his theatrical career before World War I and after consisted of revivals of popular and Shakesperean plays such as The Merchant of Venice, Julius Caesar, the all-star play Diplomacy, and The Rivals. In 1922, he played Claudius in John Barrymore's groundbreaking production of Hamlet.

=== Films ===
After an extremely prosperous 30 years of acting on the stage and touring around the world, Power moved into silent films in 1914. Initially playing the leading man in films, he soon switched to playing villains and proved highly successful. In 1916, Power played the male lead in Where Are My Children?, a serious film about birth control and social issues directed by pioneer director Lois Weber and her husband Phillips Smalley. A pristine copy of this film is preserved in the Library of Congress. That same year Power appeared in a Selig film called John Needham's Double. When not acting on Broadway, Power appeared in films. Producer William Fox found him a great character part at Fox Studios in Footfalls (1921).

Also in 1921 Power appeared in D.W. Griffith's Dream Street in which experimental synchronised sound was used, using the Photokinema sound-on-disc system. In 1924, Power was in the cast of the sumptuous Janice Meredith, a Hearst-produced vehicle for Marion Davies. In 1925, Power appeared in a film called The Red Kimono, a film as daring as Where Are My Children? had been a decade earlier. The Red Kimono was produced and partly written by Dorothy Davenport, the widow of Wallace Reid.

Power finished out the decade and silent era in several A-list silent films. In 1930, Power had a great role as the villainous "bull whacker" Red Flack in Raoul Walsh's widescreen epic The Big Trail, which was shot on location across the American West and was Power's first (and only) talkie, and provided an unknown John Wayne with his first starring role. Power then prepared to film a sound remake of The Miracle Man, which had been a great silent success in 1919 for Lon Chaney.

Both Where Are My Children? and The Red Kimono were chosen to be included in the Pioneers: First Women Filmmakers Blu-ray DVD collection.

== Death ==
While filming The Miracle Man, Power died of a heart attack on 23 December 1931 in the arms of his 17-year-old son at his apartment at the Hollywood Athletic Club. He was 62. As Power had filmed only a few scenes before his death, his role was filled by fellow veteran actor Hobart Bosworth.

== Stage appearances ==
Production	Production	Company, Dates
The Private Secretary; Charles Hawtrey	Gibson	his debut on 29 November 1886 with St. Augustine, Florida stock company
Saratoga; Bronson Howard	The Hon. William Carter	at Mechanics' Institute, St. John, NB, Huebner-Holmes Co., 22 June 1888
The Texan; Tyrone Power Sr	William Plainleigh	at Opera House, St. John, NB and at the Masonic Hall at Chatham and Newcastle, New Brunswick, own company, June, 1893, and at Princess's Theatre, London, June 1894
The Two Roses; James Albery	Digby Grant	at Opera House, St. John, NB, own company, June 1893
Betsy	Adolphus	at Opera House, St. John, NB, own company, June 1893
The Sins of the Fathers; W. Lestocq	Sir Roger Walvernby & Norman Vernley	at Opera House, St. John, NB, own company, June 1893
Guy Mannering; Sir Walter Scott	Dominie Sampson	opened at Montreal, Fanny Janauschek company c. 1888–1891
The School for Scandal; Richard Brinsley Sheridan	Sir Oliver Surface	Augustin Daly players, 1891
The Magistrate; Arthur Wing Pinero	Posket	Augustin Daly players, c. 1891–1898
The Cabinet Minister; Arthur Wing Pinero	Brooke Twombley	Augustin Daly players, c. 1891–1898
The Foresters; Alfred Tennyson	Much the Miller	Augustin Daly players, c. 1891–1898
As You Like It; William Shakespeare	Frederick	Augustin Daly players, c. 1891–1898
Love's Labour's Lost; William Shakespeare	Holofernes	Augustin Daly players, c. 1891–1898
Much Ado about Nothing; William Shakespeare	Antonio	Augustin Daly players, c. 1891–1898
The Taming of the Shrew; William Shakespeare	Christopher Sly	Augustin Daly players, c. 1891–1898, and with own company Australia and New Zealand tour 1900–1902
The Tempest; William Shakespeare	Caliban	Augustin Daly players, c.1891–1898
The Merry Wives of Windsor; William Shakespeare	Host of the Garter Inn	Augustin Daly players, c. 1891–1898
Magda; Hermann Sudermann	-	Minnie Maddern Fiske's company c.1890s
Frou-Frou; Henri Meilhac, Ludovic Halévy	-	Minnie Maddern Fiske's company c.1890s
Becky Sharp; Langdon Mitchell ad. Thackeray's Vanity Fair	Lord Steyne	Minnie Maddern Fiske's company, Fifth Avenue Theatre, 12 September – December 1899, 116 performances
Tess of the d'Urbervilles; Thomas Hardy dram.	-	Australia and New Zealand tour 1900–1902
Trilby; George du Maurier dram.	-	Australia and New Zealand tour 1900–1902
Our Boys; Henry James Byron	-	Australia and New Zealand tour 1900–1902
The Only Way; Freeman C. Wills, Frederick Langbridge ad. A Tale of Two Cities	-	Australia and New Zealand tour 1900–1902
The Merchant of Venice; William Shakespeare	Bassanio	at the Lyceum Theatre, London with Henry Irving and Ellen Terry, June – July 1902
Mary of Magdala; William Winter	Judas Iscariot	Minnie Maddern Fiske's company, Manhattan Theatre, November 1902, 105 performances
Ulysses; Stephen Phillips	Ulysses	at the Garden Theatre, 14 September – November 1903, 65 performances
Ingomar the Barbarian; Maria Ann Lovell	Ingomar	at the Empire Theatre, Broadway, 16 May 1904
Yvette; Pierre Berton ad. Cosmo Gordon Lennox	-	at the Knickerbocker Theatre, Broadway, 13 May 1904
When Knighthood Was in Flower; Charles Major ad. Paul Kester	The Princess	at the Empire Theatre, Broadway, May 1904, 16 performances
Adrea; David Belasco	-	at the Belasco Theatre, 1 January – 26 April 1905, 123 performances
Tess of the d'Urbervilles	-	at the Elitch Theatre, August 1905
The Redskin; Donald MacLaren	Lonawanda	at the Liberty Theatre, 3 January – March 1906, 26 performances
The Strength of the Weak; Alice M. Smith, Charlotte Thompson	-	at the Liberty Theatre, 17 April – May 1906
The Christian Pilgrim; James MacArthur	Apollyon, Beelzebub, Giant Despair, Lord Hategood	at the Liberty Theatre, November 1907, 14 performances
The Servant in the House; Charles Rann Kennedy	Robert Smith	at the Savoy Theatre, 23 March – 1 June 1908, 80 performances, 19 October – November 1908, 48 performances
Thais; Anatole France, ad. Paul Wilstach	-	at the Criterion Theatre, 14 March – April 1911, 31 performances "Julius Caesar" Marcus Brutus one performance for 40,000 at Beachwood Canyon, Hollywood, May 1916
Julius Caesar; William Shakespeare	Marcus Brutus	at the Lyric Theatre, 4 November – December 1912, 32 performances, outdoor performance before 40,000 at Beachwood Canyon Hollywood, May 1916, one performance at the Cort Theatre, 15 March 1918
Chu Chin Chow; Oscar Asche	Abu Hasan	American premiere at the Manhattan Opera House, 22 October 1917, second run at the Century Theatre, 14 January – April 1918, 208 performances
The Little Brother; Milton Goldsmith, Benedict James	-	at the Belmont Theatre, 25 November 1918 – March 1919, 120 performances
The Wandering Jew; Ernest Temple Thurston	Mathathias, The Unknown Knight, Matteo Battadio, Matteos Battadios	at the Knickerbocker Theatre, opened 26 October 1921
The Rivals; Richard Brinsley Sheridan	Sir Anthony Absolute	at the Empire Theatre, opened 5 June 1922
Hamlet; William Shakespeare	Claudius King of Denmark	at the Sam H. Harris Theatre, 16 November 1922 – February 1923, 101 performances
Venus; Rachel Crothers	Herbert Beveridge	at the Theatre Masque, 26 December 1927 – January 1928, 8 performances
Diplomacy; Victorien Sardou	Markham	at Erlanger's Theatre, 28 May – July 1928, 40 performances
The Unknown Warrior; Paul Raynal trans. Cecil Lewis	Elderly Man	at Charles Hopkins Theatre, 29 October – November 1928, 8 performances
The Merchant of Venice; William Shakespeare	Duke of Venice	at the Royale Theatre, opened 16 November 1931, 8 performances

== Filmography ==
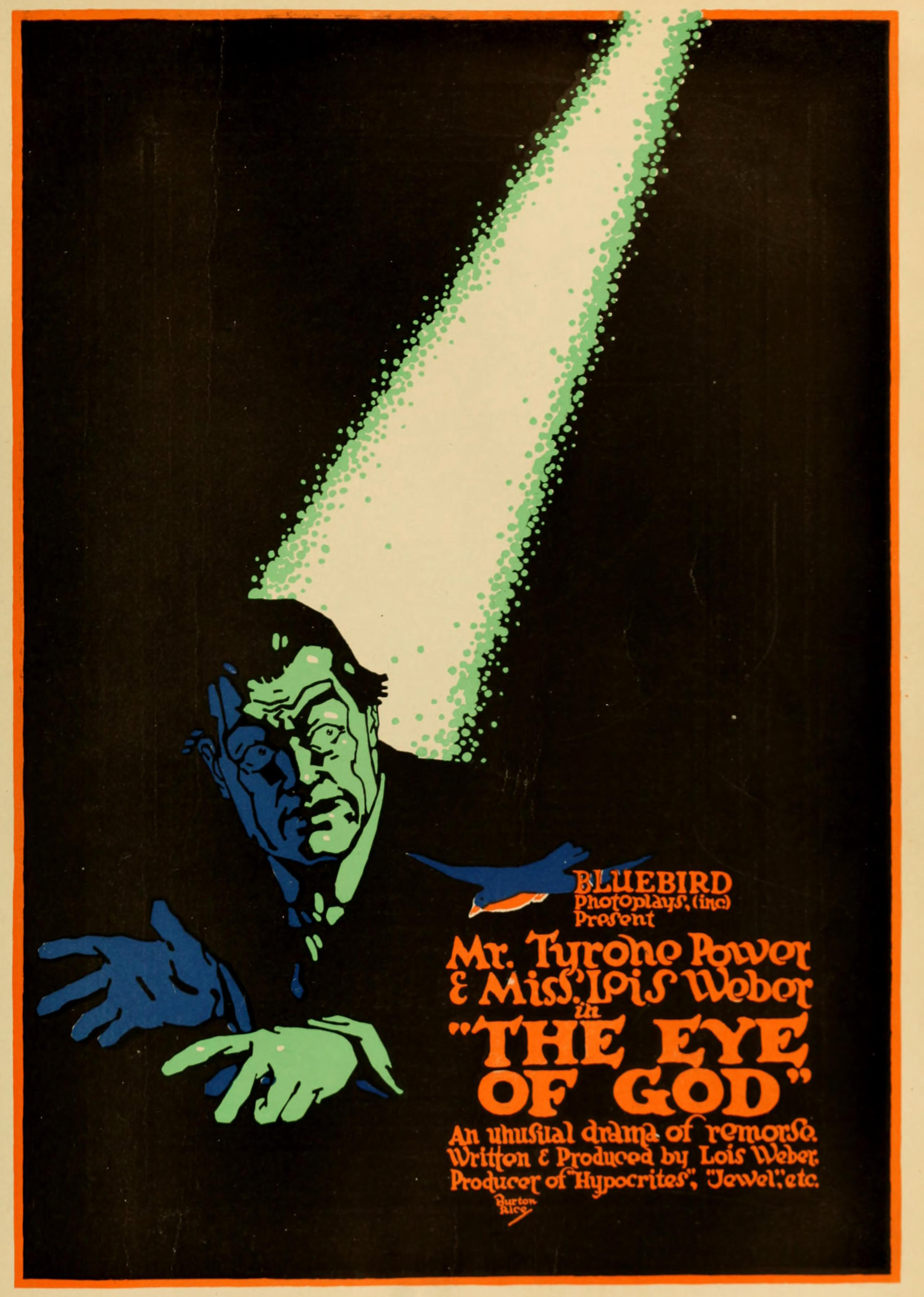
Poster for The Eye of God (1916)

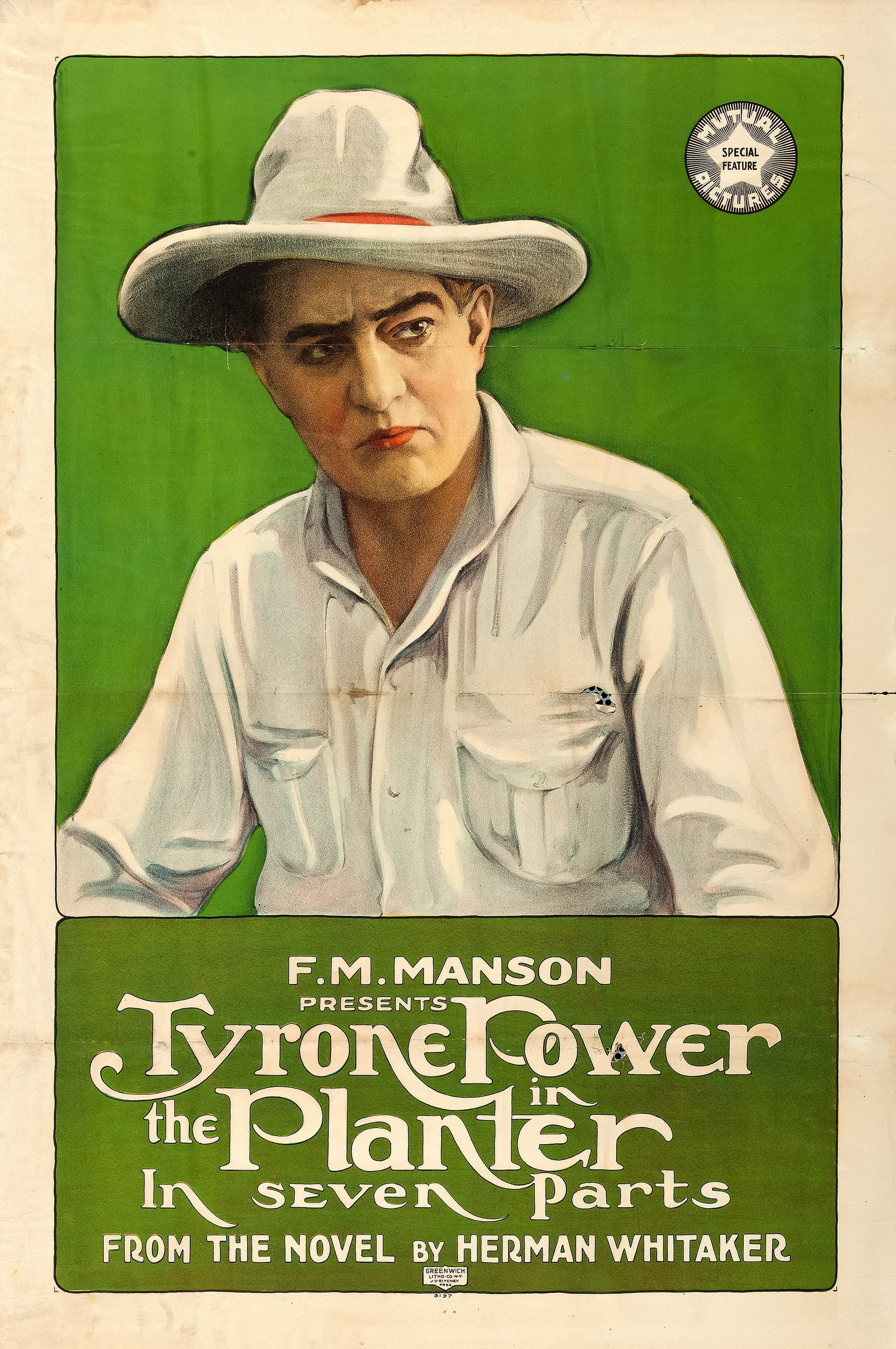
Poster for The Planter (1917)

Year	Title	Role	Notes
1914	Aristocracy	Jefferson Stockton	
1915	A Texas Steer	Maverick Brander	
1915	Sweet Alyssum	Roanoke Brooks	
1916	Thou Shalt Not Covet	I, or the Hero	
1916	John Needham's Double	Lord John Needham/Joseph Norbury	
1916	Where Are My Children?	Richard Walton	
1916	The Eye of God	Olaf	
1917	The Planter	Ludwig Hertzer	
1917	Lorelei of the Sea	Paul	
1917	National Red Cross Pageant	Servia	
1920	The Great Shadow	Jim McDonald	
1921	Dream Street	A Preacher of the Streets	
1921	The Black Panther's Cub	Count Boris Orliff	
1921	Footfalls	Hiram Scudder	
1923	Fury	Captain Leyton	
1923	The Truth About Wives	Howard Hendricks	
1923	Bright Lights of Broadway	John Kirk	
1923	Wife in Name Only	Dornham	
1923	The Daring Years	James LaMotte	
1923	The Day of Faith	Michael Anstell	
1924	Damaged Hearts	Sandy	
1924	The Lone Wolf	Bannon	
1924	Trouping with Ellen	Mr. Llewellyn	
1924	The Story Without a Name	Drakma	
1924	For Another Woman		
1924	Greater Than Marriage	Father	
1924	Janice Meredith	Lord Cornwallis	
1924	The Law and the Lady	John Langley Sr.	
1925	The Wanderer	Jesse	
1925	Where Was I?	George Stone	
1925	A Regular Fellow	King	
1925	The Red Kimono	Gabrielle's Father	
1925	Braveheart	Standing Rock	
1925	Bride of the Storm	Jacob Kroon	
1926	The Test of Donald Norton	John Corrigal	
1926	Out of the Storm	Mr. Lawrence	
1926	Hands Across the Border	John Drake	
1930	The Big Trail	Red Flack	
