= Tyrone Power =

American actor (1914–1958)

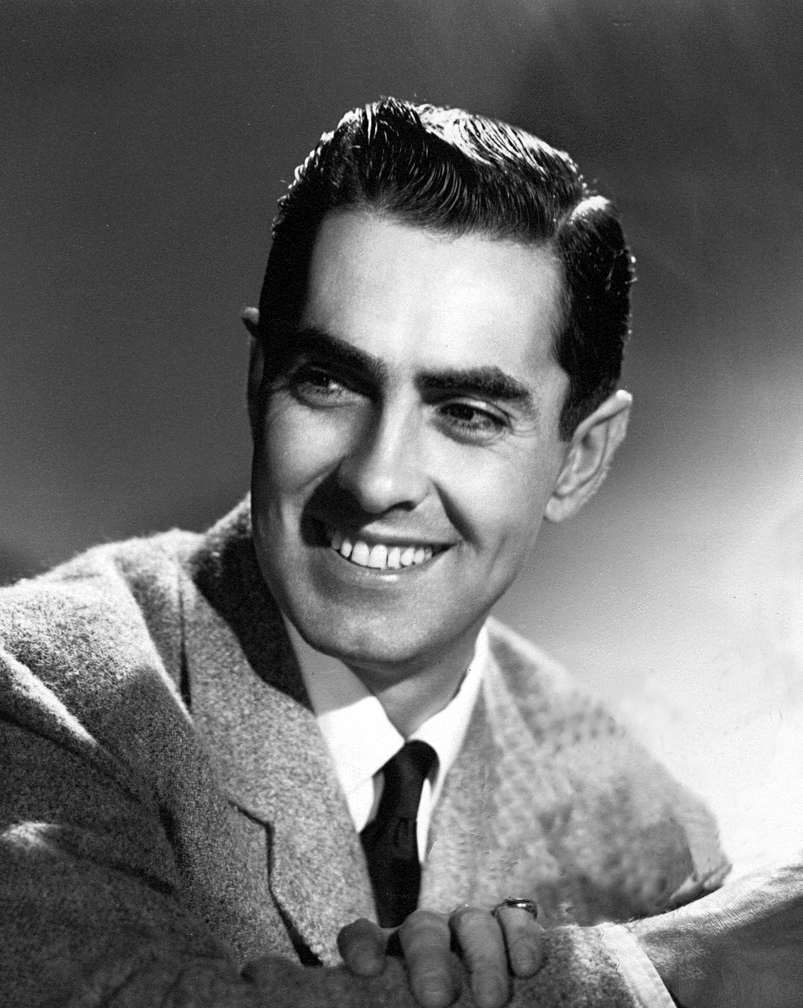
- Power in the 1940s
- Born: Tyrone Edmund Power III; May 5, 1914; Cincinnati, Ohio, U.S.
- Died: November 15, 1958 (aged 44); Madrid, Spain
- Burial place: Hollywood Forever Cemetery; Los Angeles, California, U.S.
- Occupation: Actor
- Years active: 1932–1958
- Spouses: Annabella (m. 1939; div. 1948); Linda Christian (m. 1949; div. 1956); Deborah Minardos (m. 1958)
- Children: Romina Power; Taryn Power; Tyrone Power Jr.
- Father: Tyrone Power Sr.
- Relatives: Ethel Lavenu (grandmother); Tyrone Power (great-grandfather)
- Military career
- Allegiance: United States
- Branch: United States Marine Corps; United States Marine Corps Reserve
- Service years: 1942–1946 (USMC); 1946–1958 (USMCR)
- Rank: First lieutenant (USMC); Major (USMCR)

Tyrone Edmund Power III (May 5, 1914 – November 15, 1958) was an American actor. From the 1930s to the 1950s, Power appeared in dozens of films, often in swashbuckler roles or romantic leads. His better-known films include Jesse James, The Mark of Zorro, Marie Antoinette, Blood and Sand, The Black Swan, Prince of Foxes, Witness for the Prosecution, The Black Rose, and Captain from Castile. Power's own favorite film among those in which he starred was Nightmare Alley.

Though largely a matinee idol in the 1930s and early 1940s and known for his striking good looks, Power starred in films in a number of genres, from drama to light comedy. In the 1950s he placed limits on the number of films he would take in order to devote more time to theater productions. He received his biggest accolades as a stage actor in John Brown's Body and Mister Roberts. Power died from a heart attack at the age of 44 in Madrid, Spain.

== Early life and education ==
Power was born in Cincinnati, Ohio, on May 5, 1914, the son of Helen Emma "Patia" (née Reaume) and the English-born American stage and screen actor Tyrone Power Sr. Power was descended from a long Irish theatrical line going back to his great-grandfather, the Irish actor and comedian born in Waterford, Ireland, Tyrone Power (1797–1841). His sister, Ann Power, was born in 1915 after the family moved to California. Their mother was Roman Catholic, and her ancestry included the French-Canadian Reaume family and French from Alsace-Lorraine. Through his paternal great-grandmother, Anne Gilbert, Power was related to the actor Laurence Olivier; through his paternal grandmother, stage actress Ethel Lavenu, he was related by marriage to author Evelyn Waugh; and through his father's first cousin, Norah Emily Gorman Power, he was related to the theatrical director Sir Tyrone Guthrie, the first director of the Stratford Festival in Canada and the Guthrie Theater in Minneapolis, Minnesota.

Power went to Cincinnati-area Catholic schools and graduated from Purcell High School in 1931, at which time he opted to join his father to learn acting from one of the stage's most respected actors.

== Early career ==
=== 1930s ===
Madeleine Carroll with Power in his first leading role, Lloyd's of London (1936)

Power joined his father for the summer of 1931, after they were apart for some years due to his parents' divorce. His father suffered a heart attack in December, dying in his son's arms, while preparing to perform in The Miracle Man. Tyrone Power Jr., as he was then known, decided to continue to pursue an acting career. He tried to find work as an actor; however, his father's contacts offered praise for the father and no work for the son. He appeared in a bit part in 1932 in Tom Brown of Culver, but his experience in that movie did not open any doors, and except for a job as an extra in Flirtation Walk, found himself frozen out of the movies. While doing community theater, he took the advice of a friend, Arthur Caesar, to go to New York to gain experience on the stage. Among the Broadway plays in which he was cast were Flowers of the Forest, Saint Joan, and Romeo and Juliet.

Power tried Hollywood in 1936. The director Henry King was impressed with his looks and poise, and insisted Power be tested for the lead role in Lloyd's of London, a role thought already to belong to Don Ameche. Despite his own reservations, Darryl F. Zanuck gave Power the role, after King and Fox film editor Barbara McLean convinced Zanuck that Power had a greater screen presence than Ameche. Power was billed fourth but had by far the most screen time of any member of the cast. He walked into the premiere of the movie an unknown and walked out a star, which he remained for the rest of his life.

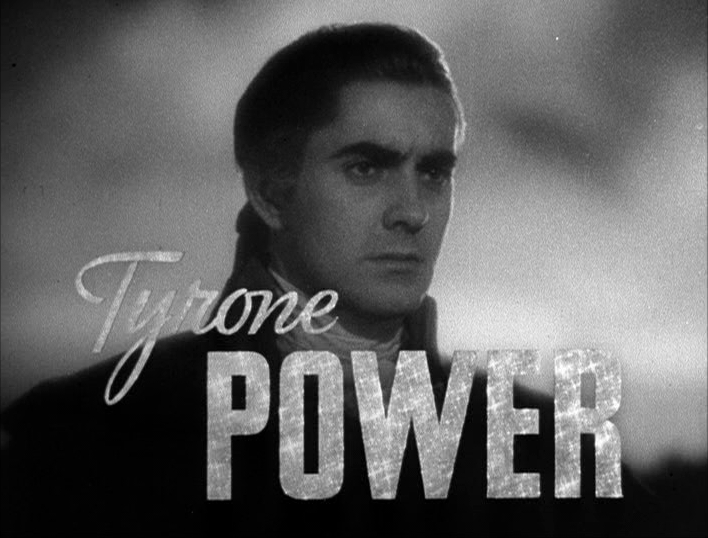
Trailer for Marie Antoinette (1938)

Power racked up hit after hit between 1936 and 1943, when his career was interrupted by military service. In these years he starred in romantic comedies such as Thin Ice and Day-Time Wife, in dramas such as Suez, Blood and Sand, Son of Fury: The Story of Benjamin Blake, The Rains Came, and In Old Chicago; in musicals Alexander's Ragtime Band, Second Fiddle, and Rose of Washington Square; in westerns Jesse James (1939) and Brigham Young; in war films A Yank in the R.A.F. and This Above All; and the swashbucklers The Mark of Zorro and The Black Swan. Jesse James was a hit at the box office but received some criticism for fictionalizing and glamorizing the famous outlaw. Shot in and around Pineville, Missouri, it was Power's first location shoot and his first Technicolor movie. (Before his career was over, he filmed a total of 16 movies in color, including the movie he was filming when he died.) He was loaned out once, to MGM for Marie Antoinette (1938). Darryl F. Zanuck was angry that MGM used Fox's biggest star in what was, despite billing, a supporting role, and vowed to never again loan him out, though Power's services were requested for the roles of Ashley Wilkes in Gone with the Wind, Joe Bonaparte in Golden Boy, and Parris in Kings Row; roles in several films produced by Harry Cohn; and the role of Monroe Stahr in a planned production by Norma Shearer of The Last Tycoon.

Power was the second biggest box-office draw of 1939, surpassed only by Mickey Rooney. His box office numbers are some of the best of all time.

=== 1940–1943 ===
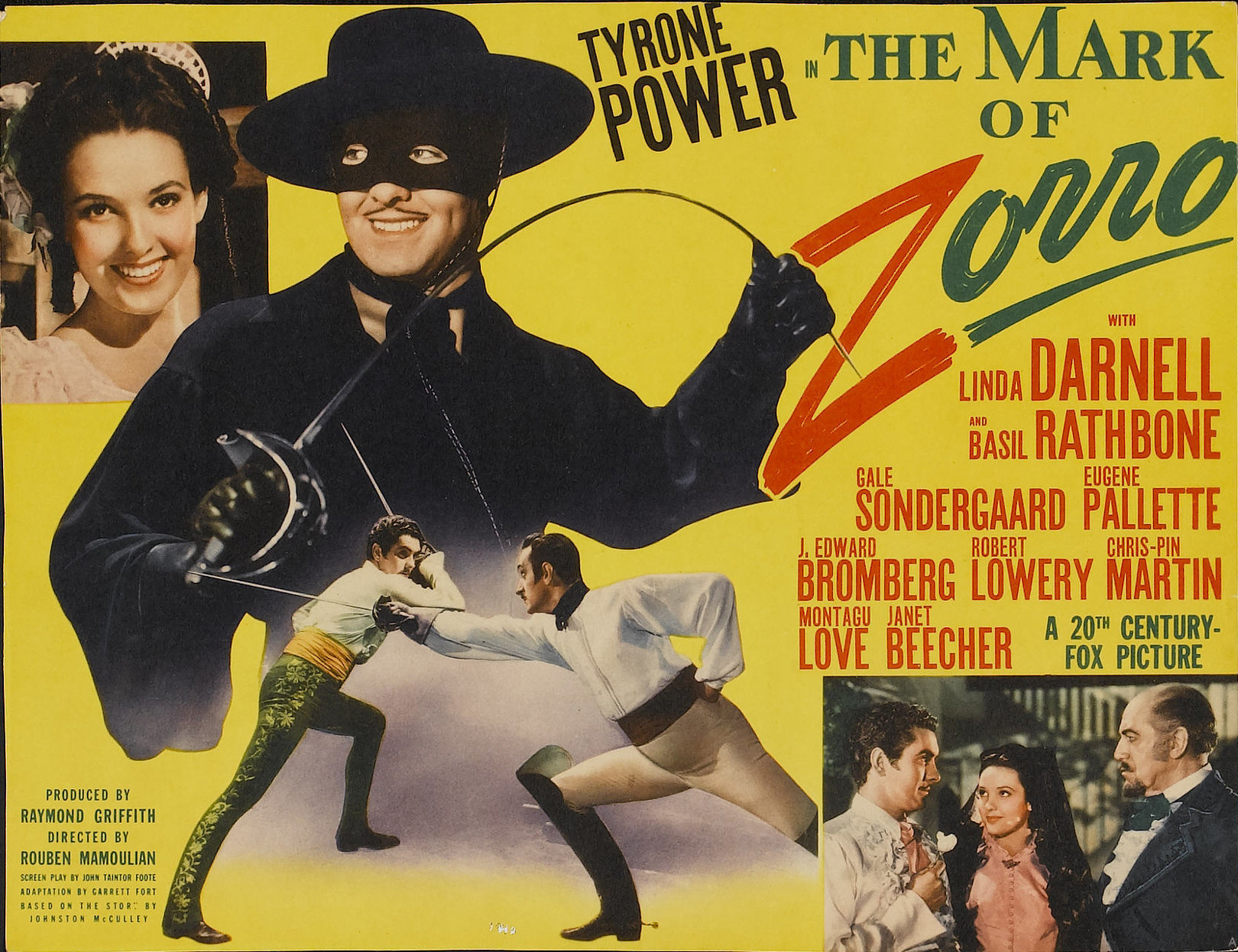
Lobby card, 1940

Power and Basil Rathbone in their duelling scene from The Mark of Zorro (1940) (note: the movie was shot in black and white; this is the colorized version)

In 1940, the direction of Power's career took a dramatic turn with The Mark of Zorro. Power played the role of Don Diego Vega/Zorro, fop by day, bandit hero by night. The film was a hit, leading 20th Century-Fox to cast Power in other swashbucklers going forward. Power was a talented swordsman in real life, and the dueling scene in The Mark of Zorro is highly regarded. The great Hollywood swordsman, Basil Rathbone, his co-star in The Mark of Zorro, commented, "Power was the most agile man with a sword I've ever faced before a camera. Tyrone could have fenced Errol Flynn into a cocked hat."

Power's career was interrupted in 1943 by military service. He reported to the United States Marine Corps for training in late 1942, but was sent back, at the request of 20th Century-Fox, to complete one further film, Crash Dive, a patriotic war movie released in 1943. He was credited as Tyrone Power, U.S.M.C.R., and the movie served as a recruiting film.

== Military service ==
In August 1942, Power enlisted in the United States Marine Corps. He attended boot camp at Marine Corps Recruit Depot San Diego, then Officers' Candidate School at Marine Corps Base Quantico, where he was commissioned a second lieutenant on June 2, 1943. He had already logged 180 solo hours as a pilot before enlisting, so he was able to do a short, intense flight training program at Naval Air Station Corpus Christi, Texas. The pass earned him his wings and a promotion to first lieutenant. The Marine Corps considered Power over the age limit for active combat flying, so he volunteered for piloting cargo planes that he felt would get him into active combat zones.

In July 1944, Power was assigned to Marine Transport Squadron (VMR)-352 as a R5C (Navy version of Army Curtiss Commando C-46) transport co-pilot at Marine Corps Air Station Cherry Point, North Carolina. The squadron moved to Marine Corps Air Station El Centro in California in December 1944. Power was later reassigned to VMR-353, joining them on Kwajalein Atoll in the Marshall Islands in February 1945. From there, he flew missions carrying cargo in and wounded Marines out during the Battles of Iwo Jima (February to March 1945) and Okinawa (April to June 1945). For his services in the Pacific War, Power was awarded the American Campaign Medal, the Asiatic-Pacific Campaign Medal with two bronze stars, and the World War II Victory Medal. Power returned to the United States in November 1945 and was released from active duty in January 1946. He was promoted to the rank of captain in the reserves on May 8, 1951. He remained in the reserves the rest of his life and reached the rank of major in 1957.

In the June 2001 Marine Air Transporter newsletter, Jerry Taylor, a retired Marine Corps flight instructor, recalled training Power as a Marine pilot. "He was an excellent student, never forgot a procedure I showed him or anything I told him." Others who served with him have also commented on how well Power was respected by those with whom he served. Following the war, 20th Century-Fox provided Power a surplus DC-3 he named The Geek that he frequently piloted. When Power died suddenly at age 44, he was buried with full military honors.

== Post-war career ==
=== Late 1940s ===
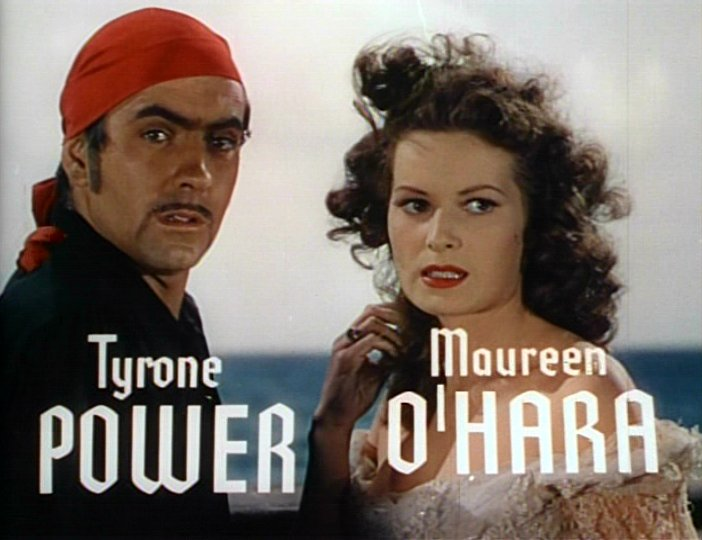
Frame from trailer for The Black Swan (1942)

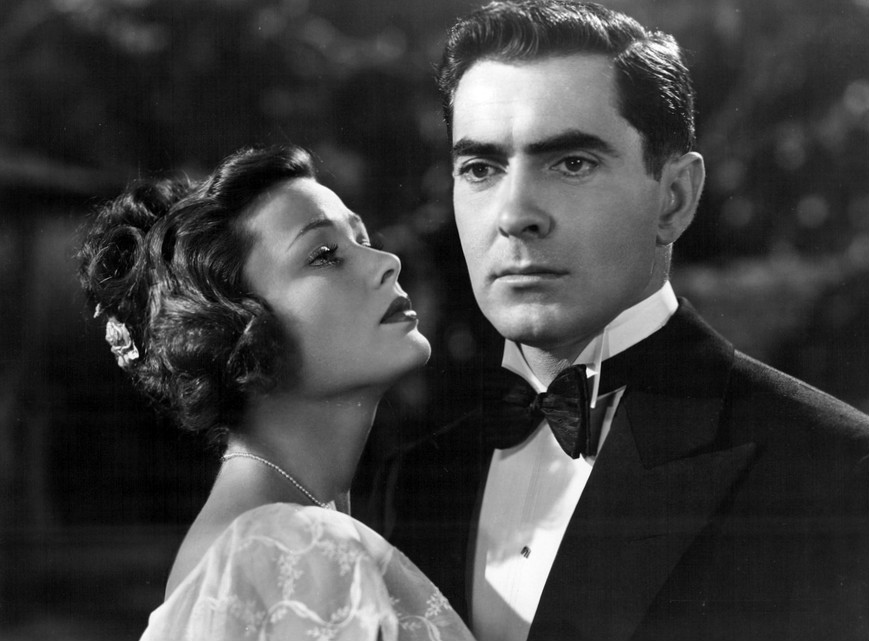
Gene Tierney and Power in The Razor's Edge (1946)

Other than re-releases of his films, Power was not seen on screen again after his entry into the Marines until 1946, when he co-starred with Gene Tierney, John Payne, and Anne Baxter in The Razor's Edge, an adaptation of W. Somerset Maugham's 1944 novel of the same title.

Next up for release was a movie Power had to fight hard to make, the film noir Nightmare Alley (1947). Darryl F. Zanuck was reluctant for Power to make the movie because his handsome appearance and charming manner had been marketable assets for the studio for many years. Zanuck feared the dark role might damage Power's image. Zanuck eventually agreed, giving Power A-list production values for what normally would be a B film. The movie was directed by Edmund Goulding, and though it was a failure at the box-office, it was one of Power's favorite roles for which he received some of the best reviews of his career. However, Zanuck continued to disapprove of his "darling boy" being seen in such a film with a downward spiral, did not publicize it, and removed it from release after just a few weeks, insisting it was a flop. The film was released on DVD in 2005 after years of legal issues.

Zanuck quickly released another costume-clad movie, Captain from Castile (also 1947), directed by Henry King, who directed Power in eleven movies. After a couple of light romantic comedies in 1948 that reunited him with two actresses under contract to 20th Century-Fox, That Wonderful Urge with Gene Tierney and The Luck of the Irish with Anne Baxter, Power made two swashbucklers, Prince of Foxes (1949) and The Black Rose (1950).

=== 1950s ===
Power was increasingly dissatisfied with costume roles and struggled between being a star and a great actor. He was forced to take roles he found unappealing, such as American Guerrilla in the Philippines (1950) and Pony Soldier (1952). In 1950, he traveled to England to play the title role in Mister Roberts on stage at the London Coliseum, bringing in sellout crowds for twenty-three weeks.

Protesting yet another costume film, Power refused to make Lydia Bailey and was suspended. (His role went to Dale Robertson.) Power next appeared in Diplomatic Courier (1952), a Cold War spy drama directed by Henry Hathaway which received modest reviews.

Power's movies had been highly profitable in the past, and as an enticement to renew his contract, Fox offered the lead role in The Robe (1953). He turned it down (Richard Burton was cast instead) and on 1 November 1952, left on a ten-week national tour of John Brown's Body, a three-person dramatic reading of Stephen Vincent Benét's narrative poem, adapted and directed by Charles Laughton, featuring Power, Judith Anderson, and Raymond Massey. The tour culminated in a run of 65 shows from February to April 1953 at the New Century Theatre on Broadway. A second national tour with the show began in October 1953, this time for four months, with Massey and Anne Baxter. In the same year, Power filmed King of The Khyber Rifles, a depiction of 1857 India, with Terry Moore and Michael Rennie.

Fox gave Power permission to seek roles outside the studio, on the understanding that he would fulfill his fourteen-film commitment to Fox in between his other projects. He made The Mississippi Gambler (1953) for Universal-International, negotiating a deal entitling him to a percentage of the profits. He earned a million dollars from the movie.

Also in 1953, actress and producer Katharine Cornell cast Power as her love interest in The Dark Is Light Enough, a verse drama play by Christopher Fry set in Austria in 1848. Between November 1954 and April 1955, Power toured the United States and Canada in the role, ending with twelve weeks at the ANTA Theater, New York, and two weeks at the Colonial Theater, Boston.

His performance in Julian Claman's A Quiet Place, staged at the National Theater, Washington, at the end of 1955 was warmly received by the critics.

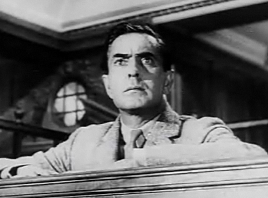
Power as the accused murderer in the 1957 adaptation of Agatha Christie's Witness for the Prosecution

Untamed (1955) was Power's last movie under his contract with 20th Century-Fox. The same year saw the release of The Long Gray Line, a John Ford film for Columbia Pictures. In 1956, the year Columbia released The Eddy Duchin Story, another great success for the star, he returned to England to play the rake Dick Dudgeon in a revival of Shaw's The Devil's Disciple for one week at the Opera House in Manchester, and nineteen weeks at the Winter Garden, London.

Zanuck persuaded him to take the lead in The Sun Also Rises (1957), adapted from the Hemingway novel, with Ava Gardner and Errol Flynn. This was his final film for Fox. Released that same year were Seven Waves Away (US: Abandon Ship!), shot in Great Britain, and John Ford's Rising of the Moon (narrator only), which was filmed in Ireland, both for Copa Productions.

In Power's last completed film role he was cast against type as the accused murderer Leonard Vole in the first film version of Agatha Christie's Witness for the Prosecution (1957), directed by Billy Wilder. The film was critically well-received and a box-office success. Writing for the National Post in 2002, Robert Fulford commented on Power's "superb performance" as "the seedy, stop-at-nothing exploiter of women". Power returned to the stage in March 1958, to play the lead in Arnold Moss's adaptation of Shaw's 1921 play Back to Methuselah.

== Personal life ==
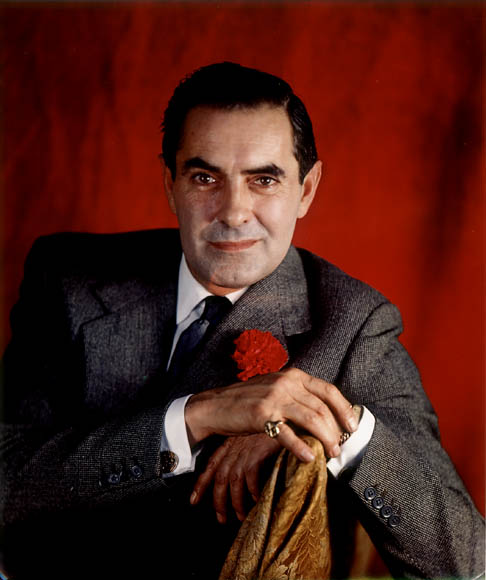
Portrait of Power by photographer Yousuf Karsh, 1946

Power was one of Hollywood's most eligible bachelors until he married French actress Annabella (born Suzanne Georgette Charpentier) on July 14, 1939. They met on the 20th Century-Fox lot around the time they starred together in Suez. Previously, he had been involved with Sonja Henie, Claire Trevor, Joan Woodbury, and Evie Abbott. In an A&E biography, Annabella said that Zanuck "could not stop Tyrone's love for me, or my love for Tyrone." To move her out of Power's life, Zanuck offered Annabella films in Europe. She refused to leave. At this point, Zanuck blacklisted her.

J. Watson Webb, close friend and an editor at 20th Century-Fox, maintained in the A&E Biography that one of the reasons the marriage fell apart was Annabella's inability to give Power a son, yet, Webb said, there was no bitterness between the couple. In a March 1947 interview in Photoplay, Power said he wanted a home and children, especially a son, to carry on his family's acting legacy.

Annabella shed some light on the situation in an interview published in Movieland in 1948. "Our troubles began because the war started earlier for me, a French-born woman, than it did for Americans." She explained that the war clouds over Europe made her unhappy and irritable, and to get her mind off her troubles, she began accepting stage work, which often took her away from home. "It is always difficult to put one's finger exactly on the place and time where a marriage starts to break up...but I think it began then. We were terribly sad about it, both of us, but we knew we were drifting apart. I didn't think then—and I don't think now—that it was his fault, or mine." The couple tried to make their marriage work after Power returned from military service, but were unable to do so. However, Power adopted Annabella's daughter, Anne, before he left for the service.

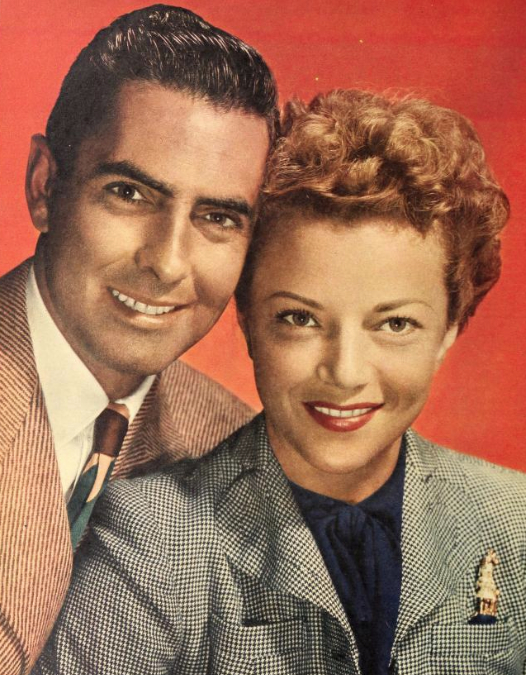
Power with Annabella, 1946. They were married in 1939 and divorced in 1948.

In 1943, Power had an affair with Judy Garland. She became pregnant with Power's child but had an abortion arranged by the studio executives.

Following his separation from Annabella, Power began a love affair with Lana Turner that lasted a couple of years. In her 1982 autobiography, Turner wrote that she became pregnant with Power's child in 1948 and chose to have an abortion.

In 1946, Power and Cesar Romero, accompanied by former test pilot, James Denton, a 20th Century Fox executive, and fellow war veteran John Jefferies as navigator, embarked on a goodwill tour throughout South America where they met, among others, Juan and Evita Perón in Argentina. On September 1, 1947, Power set out on another goodwill trip around the world, piloting his own plane, "The Geek". He flew with Bob Buck, another experienced pilot and war veteran. Buck wrote in his autobiography that Power had a "photographic mind, was an excellent pilot, and genuinely liked people." They flew with a crew to locations in Europe and South Africa, and were often mobbed by fans.

In 1948, when "The Geek" reached Rome, Power met and fell in love with Linda Christian. Turner wrote that the story of her dining out with Frank Sinatra was leaked to Power, causing him to become upset at her "dating" another man in his absence. Turner also said it was not a coincidence that Linda Christian was at the same hotel as Power and implied that Christian obtained his itinerary from 20th Century-Fox.

Power and Christian were married in Rome on January 27, 1949, in the Church of Santa Francesca Romana, with an estimated 8,000 to 10,000 screaming fans outside. Christian miscarried three times before giving birth to a baby girl, Romina Francesca Power, on October 2, 1951. A second daughter, Taryn Stephanie Power, was born on September 13, 1953. Around the time of Taryn's birth, the marriage became rocky. In her autobiography, Christian blamed the breakup of the marriage on her husband's extramarital affairs, including his long involvement with Anita Ekberg, but acknowledged her own affair with Edmund Purdom, which created great tension between Christian and her husband. They divorced in 1955.

After the divorce, Power had a lengthy love affair with Mai Zetterling, whom he met on the set of Abandon Ship!. The two lived together, though Power vowed he would never marry again, as he had been burned financially by his previous marriages. He also had an affair with a Vogue editor, Mary Roblee, and British actress Thelma Ruby.

In 1957, he met the former Deborah Jean Smith (sometimes incorrectly referred to as Deborah Ann Montgomery), who went by her former married name, Debbie Minardos. They were married on May 7, 1958, and she became pregnant soon after with Tyrone Power Jr., the son he had always wanted.

== Death ==
In September 1958, the Powers traveled to Madrid and Valdespartera, Spain, for him to film the epic Solomon and Sheba, directed by King Vidor and costarring Gina Lollobrigida. Power had already completed most of his scenes when he was stricken by a massive heart attack while performing a duel with his frequent costar and friend George Sanders. A chain smoker who smoked three to four packs of cigarettes a day, Power was probably also affected by hereditary heart disease. A doctor diagnosed the cause of Power's death as "fulminant angina pectoris". The actor died while being transported to a hospital in Madrid on November 15, 1958. He was 44 years old.

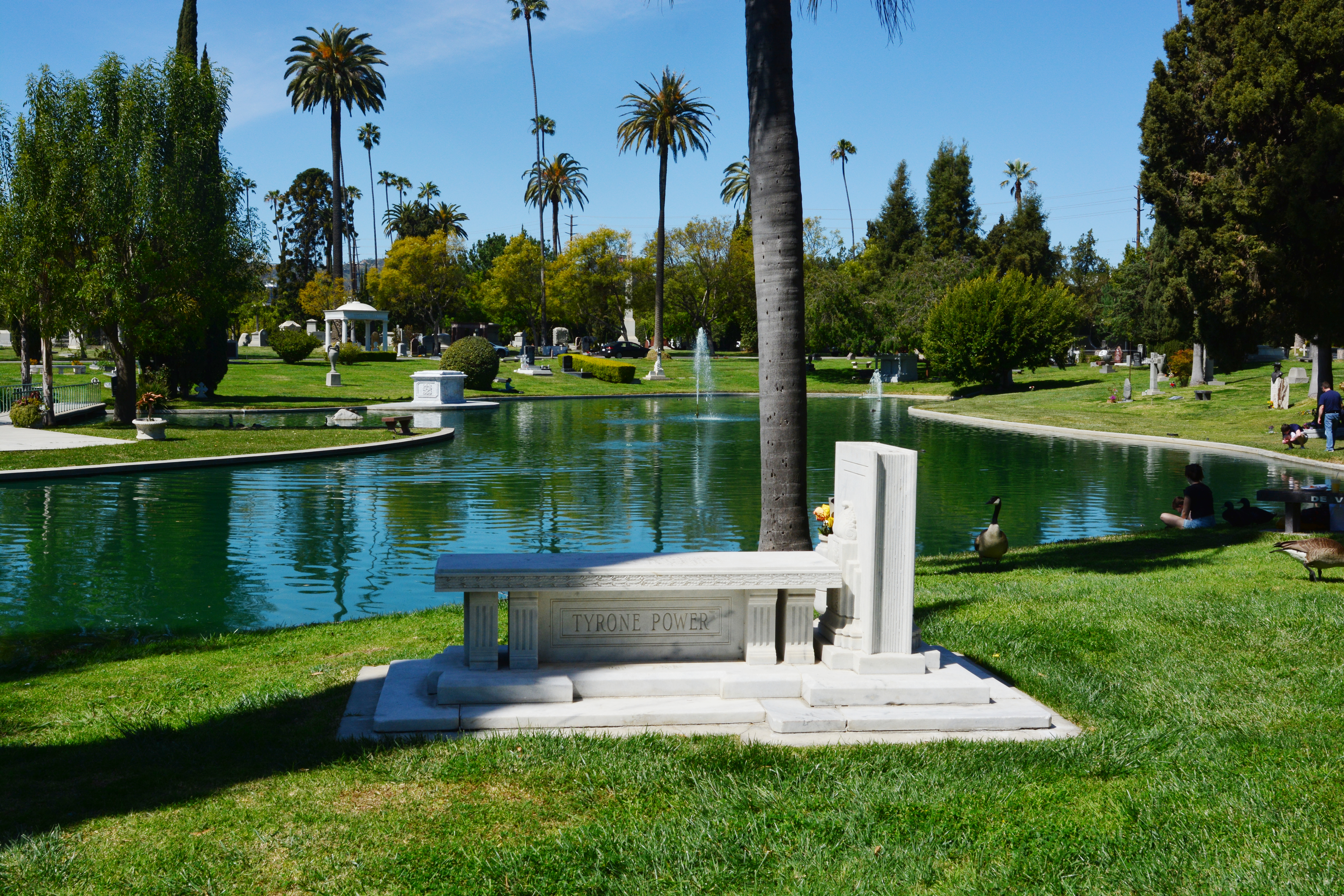
Grave of Tyrone Power at Hollywood Forever

Power was interred at Hollywood Forever Cemetery (then known as Hollywood Cemetery) in a military service on November 21. Henry King flew over the service; almost 20 years before, Power had flown in King's plane to the set of Jesse James in Missouri, Power's first experience with flying. Aviation became an important part of his life, both in the U.S. Marines and as a civilian. In the foreword to Dennis Belafonte's The Films of Tyrone Power, King wrote: "Knowing his love for flying and feeling that I had started it, I flew over his funeral procession and memorial park during his burial, and felt that he was with me."

The actor was laid to rest beside a small lake. His grave is marked with a stone in the form of a marble bench containing the masks of comedy and tragedy with the inscription "Good night, sweet prince." At the graveside, Laurence Olivier read the poem "High Flight".

Power's will, filed December 8, 1958, contained the then-unusual provision that his eyes be donated to the Estelle Doheny Eye Foundation for corneal transplantation or retinal study.

Deborah Power gave birth to a son on January 22, 1959, two months after her husband's death. She married producer Arthur Loew Jr. later that year.

== Honors ==
For Power's contributions to motion pictures, he was honored in 1960 with a star on the Hollywood Walk of Fame at 6747 Hollywood Blvd. On the 50th anniversary of his death, Power was honored by American Cinematheque with a weekend of films and remembrances by co-stars and family as well as a memorabilia display at the Egyptian Theatre in Los Angeles from November 14–16, 2008. Also on display were the two known surviving panels from a large painted glass mural Power and his wife commissioned for their home, celebrating highlights of their lives and special moments in Power's career. The December 2, 1952, issue of Look Magazine featured this mural in a four-page spread titled "The Tyrone Powers Pose For Their Portraits".

Power is seen on the cover of The Beatles' album Sgt. Pepper's Lonely Hearts Club Band in the third row. In 2018, Power was ranked the 21st-most-popular male film star in history.

== Stage appearances ==
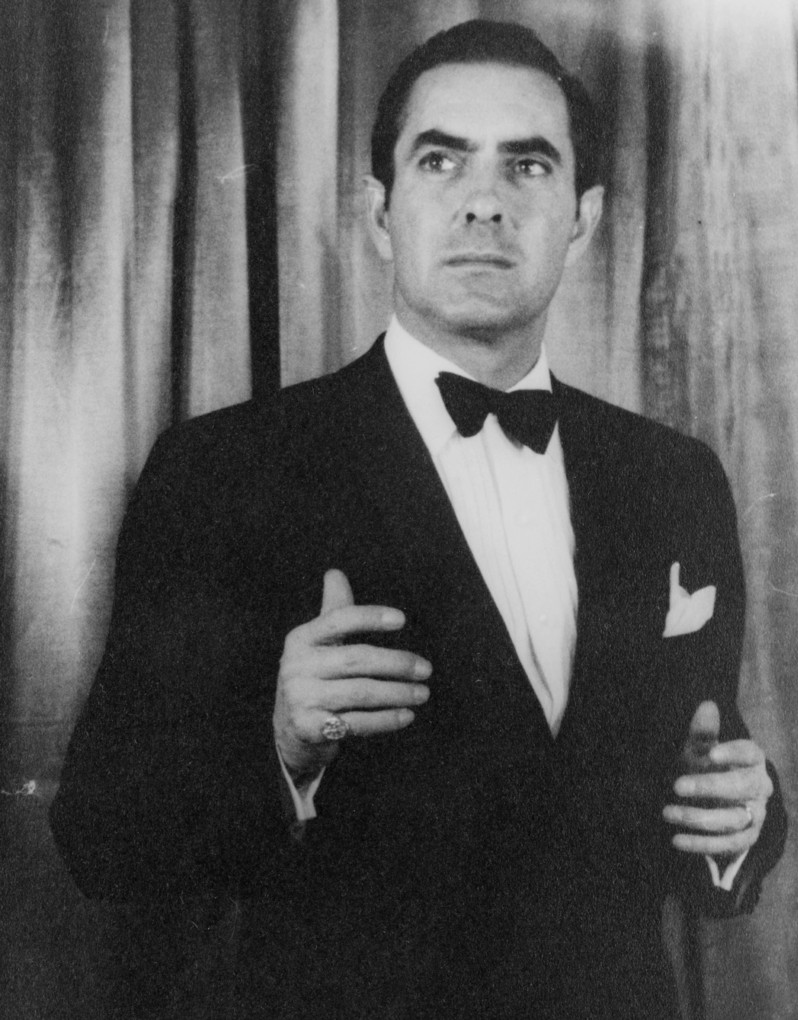
Tyrone Power's theater work John Brown's Body (1953)

- Low and Behold, Pasadena Playhouse and Hollywood Music Box Theatre, CA (1933)
- Three-Cornered Moon, Lobero Theatre, Santa Barbara CA (1933)
- Flowers of the Forest, Martin Beck Theatre, NY (1935–1936)
- Romeo and Juliet, Martin Beck Theatre, NY (1935)
- Saint Joan, Martin Beck Theatre, NY (1936)
- Liliom, the Country Playhouse, Westport CT (1941)
- Mister Roberts, London Coliseum, England (1950)
- John Brown's Body, Lobero Theatre, Santa Barbara CA (1952)
- John Brown's Body, Broadway Century Theatre, NY (1952–1953)
- The Dark is Light Enough (1955)
- A Quiet Place, The Playwrights Co. (1955–1956)
- The Devil's Disciple, Winter Garden Theatre, London, England (1956)
- Back to Methuselah, Ambassador Theatre, NY (1958)

== Radio appearances ==
Year	Program	Episode	Co-star
1940	Lux Radio Theatre	"The Rage of Manhattan"	w/ Annabella
1941	Lux Radio Theatre	"Blood and Sand"	w/ Annabella
1942	Lux Radio Theatre	"This Above All"	w/ Barbara Stanwyck
1949	Lux Radio Theatre	"The Bishop's Wife"	w/ David Niven
1952	Lux Radio Theatre	"I'll Never Forget You"	w/ Debra Paget
1954	Lux Radio Theatre	"The Mississippi Gambler"	w/ Linda Christian
1954	Suspense	"The Guilty Always Run"	w/ Cathy Lewis

== In popular culture ==
- In "Out of Town," the premiere of the third season of Mad Men (2009), a flight attendant tells Don Draper that her friend thinks he looks like Tyrone Power, referencing Power's reputation as one of Hollywood's most handsome leading men.
