= The Heart of the Hills =

The Heart of the Hills may refer to:

- The Heart of the Hills (1914 film), a silent short film
- The Heart of the Hills (1916 film), an American silent drama film
