= The Wedding Guest =

The Wedding Guest can refer to:

- The Wedding Guest (1916 film), an American silent film
- The Wedding Guest (2018 film), a British-American action thriller
