= Charles Williams (American actor) =

American actor and writer (1898–1958)

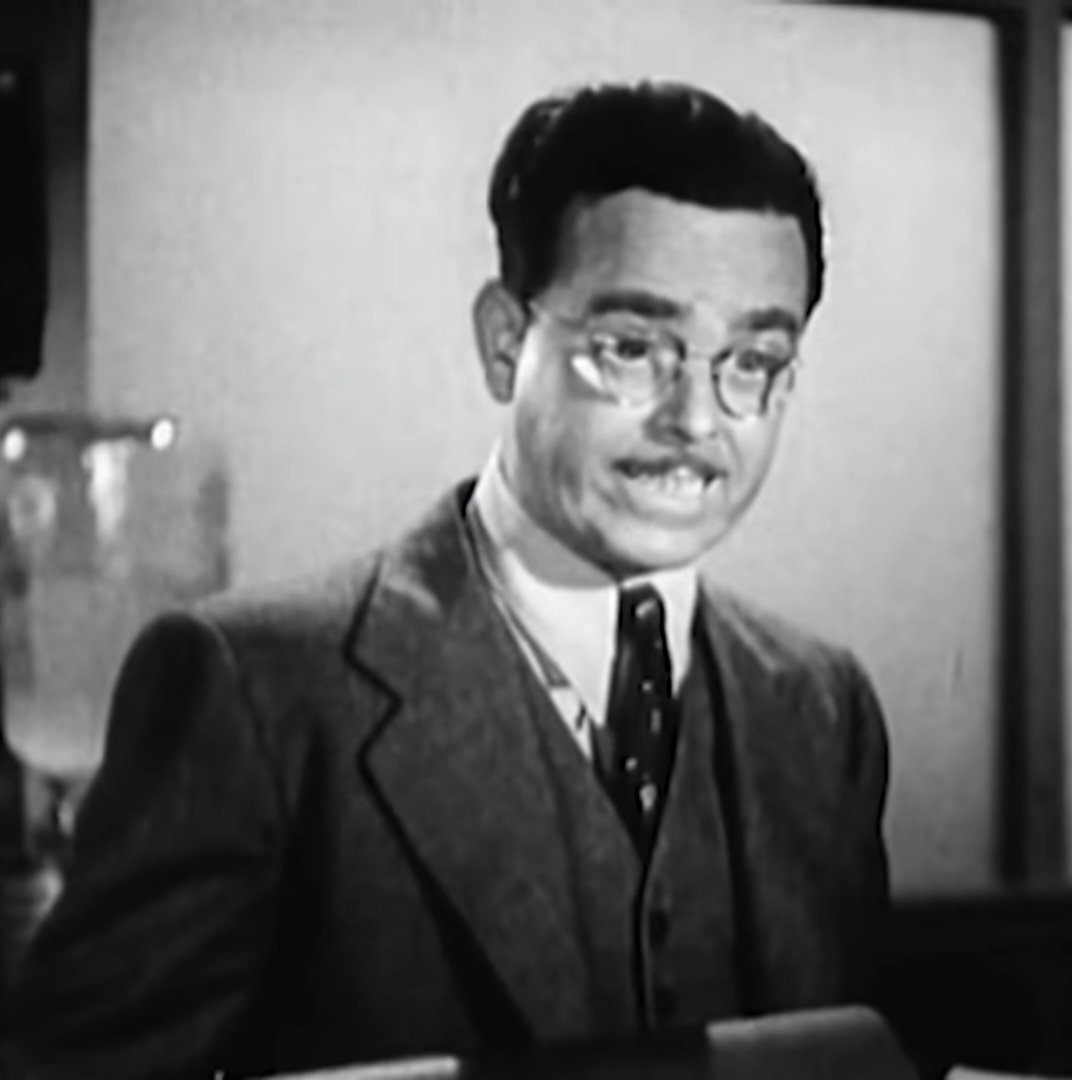
- Williams in Career Girl (1944)
- Born: September 27, 1898; Albany, New York City, U.S.
- Died: January 3, 1958 (aged 59); Hollywood, California, U.S.
- Resting place: Holy Cross Cemetery, Culver City
- Occupations: Actor; writer
- Years active: 1922–1956
- Spouses: Virginia Josephine Evans (m. 1928; died 1944) Isabel Fannie Brown (m. 1945)

Charles Williams (September 27, 1898 – January 3, 1958) was an American actor and writer. He appeared in over 260 film and television productions between 1922 and 1956. He also worked as a writer on 30 films between 1932 and 1954.

== Career ==
He started his film career in the early 1920s in Paramount's New York studios, where he made his film debut in The Old Homestead, but also worked behind the camera as a writer and assistant director. With the arrival of sound film, he went to Hollywood and became a supporting actor there. The actor with the short stature and high-pitched voice was often uncredited for his appearances, although he had larger roles in a number of B movies.

Williams was known as a "B-movie regular", who often portrayed quirky, somewhat nerdy, bespectacled clerks, photographers and especially reporters. He is perhaps best remembered today for appearing in It's a Wonderful Life as Eustace, George Bailey's cousin and co-worker at the Building and Loan. Near the end of his life and career, Williams also played in a number of television series.

== Death ==
Williams died in 1958 and is buried at Holy Cross Cemetery in Culver City, California.

== Selected filmography ==
- The Old Homestead (1922) - Gabe Waters
- Action Galore (1925) - Luke McLean
- The Mad Genius (1931) - Stagehand (uncredited)
- Forgotten Women (1931) - Jerry - Stagehand (uncredited)
- Delicious (1931) - Honeymooner (uncredited)
- Dance Team (1932) - Benny Weber
- Letty Lynton (1932) - Reporter (uncredited)
- Strangers of the Evening (1932) - 1st Passerby
- Radio Patrol (1932) - Axe-Murderer Suspect (uncredited)
- Blondie of the Follies (1932) - Mr. Kinskey - Lottie's Friend (uncredited)
- 70,000 Witnesses (1932) - Reporter (uncredited)
- Faithless (1932) - Reporter (uncredited)
- Madison Square Garden (1932) - Reporter at Ringside (uncredited)
- Flesh (1932) - Radio Sports Reporter (uncredited)
- The Devil Is Driving (1932) - Bill Jones (uncredited)
- Frisco Jenny (1932) - Party Guest (uncredited)
- Central Airport (1933) - El Paso Hotel Desk Clerk (uncredited)
- Made on Broadway (1933) - Photographer (uncredited)
- The Nuisance (1933) - Skating Rink Official (uncredited)
- Gambling Ship (1933) - Baby Face
- Sitting Pretty (1933) - A Neighbor (uncredited)
- Dancing Lady (1933) - Man Arrested in Burlesque Theater (uncredited)
- The Big Shakedown (1934) - Man Buying Aspirin (uncredited)
- This Side of Heaven (1934) - Jimmy - Reporter (uncredited)
- The Crosby Case (1934) - Taxi Rider (uncredited)
- The Show-Off (1934) - Smith (uncredited)
- The Lost Jungle (1934) - Cub Reporter
- A Very Honorable Guy (1934) - Druggist (uncredited)
- Sadie McKee (1934) - Pest in Cafe (uncredited)
- Private Scandal (1934) - Reporter (uncredited)
- The Thin Man (1934) - Fighter Manager (uncredited)
- Now I'll Tell (1934) - One of Honey Smith's Boys (uncredited)
- Friends of Mr. Sweeney (1934) - Vender (scenes deleted)
- The Cat's-Paw (1934) - Reporter (uncredited)
- The Girl from Missouri (1934) - Photographer with Sullivan (uncredited)
- Dames (1934) - Dance Director (uncredited)
- Woman in the Dark (1934) - Hotel Desk Clerk
- The Drag-Net (1936) - Reporter (uncredited)
- Rhythm on the Range (1936) - Gopher Mazda
- Charlie Chan at the Race Track (1936) - Reporter (uncredited)
- Hollywood Boulevard (1936) - Reporter (uncredited)
- Wedding Present (1936) - Reporter (uncredited)
- Rose Bowl (1936) - Football Player (uncredited)
- Four Days' Wonder (1936) - Kasky
- Arizona Mahoney (1936) - Short Cowhand (uncredited)
- Crack-Up (1936) - Reporter (uncredited)
- Sinner Take All (1936) - Minor Role (uncredited)
- Sing Me a Love Song (1936) - Man Listening to Haines Sing (uncredited)
- Love Is News (1937) - Joe Brady
- Espionage (1937) - Simmons (uncredited)
- Fair Warning (1937) - Hotel Clerk (uncredited)
- History Is Made at Night (1937) - Room Service Waiter on Ship (uncredited)
- Jim Hanvey, Detective (1937) - Brackett
- A Star Is Born (1937) - Hanley (uncredited)
- As Good as Married (1937) - Lecturer (uncredited)
- Turn Off the Moon (1937) - Brooks
- Big Business (1937) - Florist Shop Customer (uncredited)
- Sing and Be Happy (1937) - Small Man (uncredited)
- Flying Fists (1937) - Meggs, the Reporter
- Wake Up and Live (1937) - Charlie Alberts, Agent
- The Lady Escapes (1937) - Florist (uncredited)
- Walter Wanger's Vogues of 1938 (1937) - Customs Man in Fall Show (uncredited)
- It Happened in Hollywood (1937) - Hymie - Photographer (uncredited)
- Charlie Chan on Broadway (1937) - Meeker
- Behind the Mike (1937) - Crunchie-Munchie Effect Man (uncredited)
- Sky Racket (1937) - Night Club Comedian (uncredited)
- Partners in Crime (1937) - Messenger (uncredited)
- Stand-In (1937) - Mr. Mack (uncredited)
- Merry-Go-Round of 1938 (1937) - Dave Clark
- Blossoms on Broadway (1937) - Elevator Man (uncredited)
- Amateur Crook (1937) - Drunk Witness
- Love and Hisses (1937) - Irving Skolsky
- In Old Chicago (1938) - Secretary / Wedding Witness (uncredited)
- Man-Proof (1938) - Reporter (uncredited)
- The Lone Ranger (1938) - Cub Reporter (uncredited)
- Born to Be Wild (1938) - Company Spotter
- Hollywood Stadium Mystery (1938) - Jake
- Mr. Moto's Gamble (1938) - Gabby Marden
- Joy of Living (1938) - Pitchman at Recording Studio (uncredited)
- Alexander's Ragtime Band (1938) - Agent
- The Marines Are Here (1938) - Bartender (uncredited)
- Men with Wings (1938) - Telegraph Operator (uncredited)
- Little Miss Broadway (1938) - Mike Brody
- Gateway (1938) - Reporter (uncredited)
- Hold That Co-ed (1938) - McFinch (uncredited)
- Just Around the Corner (1938) - Candid Cameraman (uncredited)
- Trade Winds (1938) - Reporter Jones (uncredited)
- Ambush (1939) - Hardware Wholesaler (uncredited)
- Wife, Husband and Friend (1939) - Jaffee
- The Ice Follies of 1939 (1939) - Max Morton (uncredited)
- The Flying Irishman (1939) - Repo Man (uncredited)
- My Wife's Relatives (1939) - (uncredited)
- Undercover Doctor (1939) - Pinky Valkus
- Unexpected Father (1939) - Timid Man (uncredited)
- Those High Grey Walls (1939) - Stranger (uncredited)
- Sabotage (1939) - Minor Role (uncredited)
- Days of Jesse James (1939) - Northern Hotel Clerk (uncredited)
- Charlie McCarthy, Detective (1939) - Peters (uncredited)
- Women Without Names (1940) - Hugh Gilman (uncredited)
- Johnny Apollo (1940) - Photographer (uncredited)
- Primrose Path (1940) - Man in Diner (uncredited)
- Enemy Agent (1940) - Restaurant Patron (uncredited)
- Girl in 313 (1940) - Henry - Husband
- Grand Ole Opry (1940) - Politician (uncredited)
- Marked Men (1940) - Charlie Sloane
- You're the One (1941) - Soda Jerk
- The Great Train Robbery (1941) - McCoy (uncredited)
- Mr. District Attorney (1941) - Detective in Café (uncredited)
- The Lady from Cheyenne (1941) - Clerk
- Reaching for the Sun (1941) - Truck Driver
- Angels with Broken Wings (1941) - (uncredited)
- Down in San Diego (1941) - Cigar Salesman (uncredited)
- Flying Cadets (1941) - Mr. Prim / Primmie, Bookkeeper
- Melody Lane (1941) - Thomas Assistant (uncredited)
- Don't Get Personal (1942) - Shell Game Spectator (uncredited)
- Blue, White and Perfect (1942) - Theodore H. Sherman Jr.- Printer
- The Fleet's In (1942) - Photographer (uncredited)
- Roxie Hart (1942) - Photographer (uncredited)
- Girls' Town (1942) - Coffer
- The Affairs of Jimmy Valentine (1942) - The Pitchman
- The Great Man's Lady (1942) - Assayer (uncredited)
- Inside the Law (1942) - Auctioneer (uncredited)
- My Favorite Spy (1942) - 3rd Speaker in Park (uncredited)
- One Thrilling Night (1942) - Theatre Manager (uncredited)
- Night in New Orleans (1942) - Citizen (uncredited)
- The Pride of the Yankees (1942) - Little Strength Machine Contestant (uncredited)
- Joan of Ozark (1942) - Representative (uncredited)
- Tales of Manhattan (1942) - Orman's Bespectacled Agent (Boyer sequence) (uncredited)
- Call of the Canyon (1942) - Agent (uncredited)
- Isle of Missing Men (1942) - Jo-Jo
- Secrets of the Underground (1942) - Hypo-News Photographer (uncredited)
- Time to Kill (1942) - The Dentist (uncredited)
- Ice-Capades Revue (1942) - Menkin (uncredited)
- Salute for Three (1943) - Sailor (uncredited)
- Chatterbox (1943) - Agent (uncredited)
- Redhead from Manhattan (1943) - Box Office Attendant (uncredited)
- I Escaped from the Gestapo (1943) - Secretary (uncredited)
- Sarong Girl (1943) - Mr. Chase
- The West Side Kid (1943) - Reporter (uncredited)
- Nobody's Darling (1943) - News Photographer (uncredited)
- Always a Bridesmaid (1943) - Saunders
- The Girl from Monterrey (1943) - Harry Hollis
- Where Are Your Children? (1943) - Mack - Comical Sailor
- Whispering Footsteps (1943) - 2nd Bank Teller (uncredited)
- Career Girl (1944) - Louis Horton
- Sweethearts of the U.S.A. (1944) - Mr. Pike
- Rosie the Riveter (1944) - Poker Player (uncredited)
- Song of the Open Road (1944) - Man Saying 'It's a Trick' (uncredited)
- Goodnight, Sweetheart (1944) - Reporter (uncredited)
- Since You Went Away (1944) - Man in Cocktail Lounge (uncredited)
- Johnny Doesn't Live Here Anymore (1944) - Court Recorder (uncredited)
- Call of the Rockies (1944) - Burton Witherspoon
- Atlantic City (1944) - Chalmers
- Kansas City Kitty (1944) - George W. Pivet (uncredited)
- Greenwich Village (1944) - Drake - Author (uncredited)
- A Wave, a WAC and a Marine (1944) -Reporter (uncredited)
- Irish Eyes Are Smiling (1944) - Song Promoter (uncredited)
- End of the Road (1944) - Jordan
- Lake Placid Serenade (1944) - Reporter (uncredited)
- Gentle Annie (1944) - Candy Butcher (uncredited)
- The Man Who Walked Alone (1945) - Moe
- Identity Unknown (1945) - Auctioneer
- Hollywood and Vine (1945) - Chick Jones
- Honeymoon Ahead (1945) - Dinky (uncredited)
- Out of This World (1945) - Joe Welch (uncredited)
- Scared Stiff (1945) - Reporter (uncredited)
- Hitchhike to Happiness (1945) - Park Magician (uncredited)
- Guest Wife (1945) - Photographer (uncredited)
- Love, Honor and Goodbye (1945) - Barker at 'Happy Land' (uncredited)
- Duffy's Tavern (1945) - Smith's Assistant (uncredited)
- Doll Face (1945) - Orville, the Drug Store Clerk (uncredited)
- A Guy Could Change (1946) - Husband (uncredited)
- The Postman Always Rings Twice (1946) - Doctor (uncredited)
- Rainbow Over Texas (1946) - Telegrapher (uncredited)
- Passkey to Danger (1946) - Mr. Williams
- Without Reservations (1946) - Louis Burt (uncredited)
- Do You Love Me (1946) - Bellhop with Box of Roses (uncredited)
- Joe Palooka, Champ (1946) - Mr. Polonski (uncredited)
- Our Hearts Were Growing Up (1946) - Cab Driver (uncredited)
- Deadline for Murder (1946) - Pat - Photographer (uncredited)
- A Boy, a Girl and a Dog (1946) - Mr. Stone
- Night and Day (1946) - Music Store Customer (uncredited)
- Red River Renegades (1946) - Clerk (uncredited)
- Queen of Burlesque (1946) - Carr - Hotel Clerk (uncredited)
- Two Guys from Milwaukee (1946) - Soundman (uncredited)
- Lady Chaser (1946) - Apartment House Manager
- Heldorado (1946) - Carnival Judge
- It's a Wonderful Life (1946) - Cousin Eustace
- Yankee Fakir (1947) - Cad (uncredited)
- Saddle Pals (1947) - Leslie
- The Trespasser (1947) - Doorkeeper (uncredited)
- The Spirit of West Point (1947) - Bill (uncredited)
- Her Husband's Affairs (1947) - Cruise Line Clerk (uncredited)
- Heading for Heaven (1947) - Eddie Williams
- My Wild Irish Rose (1947) - Husband (uncredited)
- April Showers (1948) - Stage Manager (uncredited)
- Half Past Midnight (1948) - Little Man Outside Apartment (uncredited)
- Hazard (1948) - Little Man in his Car
- The Dude Goes West (1948) - Harris (uncredited)
- Marshal of Amarillo (1948) - Hiram Short
- Texas, Brooklyn and Heaven (1948) - Reporter (uncredited)
- Embraceable You (1948) - Albert Martin, Realtor (uncredited)
- Good Sam (1948) - Little Man (scenes deleted)
- The Strange Mrs. Crane (1948) - McLean
- Parole, Inc. (1948) - Titus Jones
- The Accused (1949) - Dorgan's Assistant (uncredited)
- The Judge (1949) - Reporter
- Grand Canyon (1949) - Bert
- Arson, Inc. (1949) - Bookie (uncredited)
- Task Force (1949) - Luggage Salesman (uncredited)
- The Woman on Pier 13 (1949) - Speaker in Park (uncredited)
- Paid in Full (1950) - Painter in Nursery (uncredited)
- Counterspy Meets Scotland Yard (1950) - Taxi Driver (uncredited)
- The Missourians (1950) - Walt - Postmaster
- Gasoline Alley (1951) - Mortie
- Lullaby of Broadway (1951) - Reporter (uncredited)
- Kentucky Jubilee (1951) - Yes Man
- According to Mrs. Hoyle (1951) - Charlie
- Criminal Lawyer (1951) - Juror (uncredited)
- Painting the Clouds with Sunshine (1951) - Husband (uncredited)
- A Millionaire for Christy (1951) - Reporter with Glasses (uncredited)
- Corky of Gasoline Alley (1951) - Morty (uncredited)
- Has Anybody Seen My Gal (1952) - Reporter (uncredited)
- She's Working Her Way Through College (1952) - Waiter (uncredited)
- The Magnetic Monster (1953) - Cabbie
- Main Street to Broadway (1953) - Bartender (uncredited)
- The Twinkle in God's Eye (1955) - Assayer (uncredited)
- A Lawless Street (1955) - Mr. Willis (uncredited)
- Fighting Trouble (1956) - Smoggy Smith (uncredited)
