= Cross Purposes (film) =

1916 short film by William Worthington

- Directed by: William Worthington
- Written by: Bess Meredyth
- Production company: Rex Motion Picture Company
- Distributed by: Universal Film Manufacturing Company
- Release date: July 26, 1916
- Country: United States

Cross Purposes is a 1916 American short drama silent black and white film directed by William Worthington and written by Bess Meredyth. It was produced by Rex Motion Picture Company and distributed by Universal Film Manufacturing Company.

== Cast ==
- Jessie Arnold as Lisa
- Jack Connolly as John Standing
- William Canfield as The Grand Duke
