= Robert Karnes =

American actor (1917–1979)

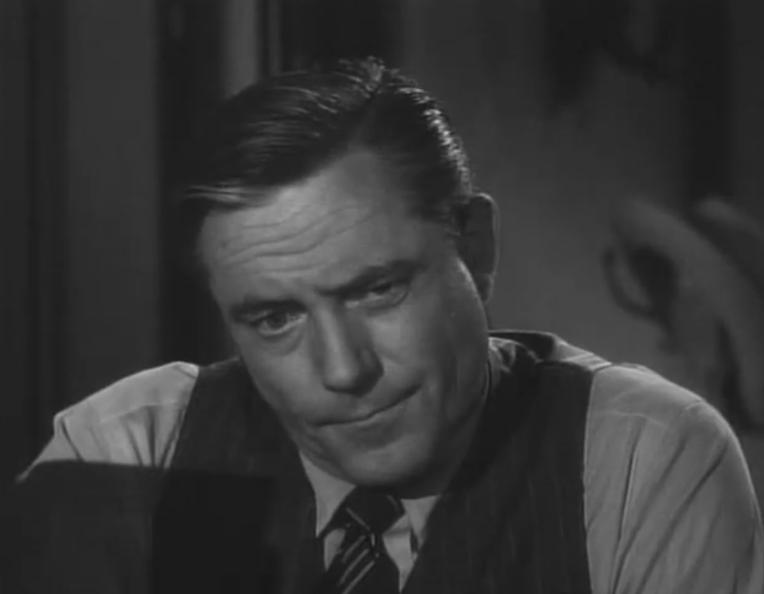
- Karnes in The Lawless Years, 1959
- Born: Robert Anthony Karnes; June 19, 1917; Kentucky, U.S.
- Died: December 4, 1979 (aged 62); Sherman Oaks, California, U.S.
- Occupations: Film, stage and television actor
- Years active: 1946–1979
- Spouse: Doris Karnes
- Children: 1

Robert Anthony Karnes (June 19, 1917 – December 4, 1979) was an American film, stage and television actor.

== Life and career ==
Karnes was born in Kentucky. He served in World War II, during which he toured the Pacific with the Maurice Evans Troupe's production of Hamlet. He began his screen career in 1946, appearing in the film The Bamboo Blonde in the uncredited role of a nightclub patron. His film career stalled when he was blacklisted because of his earlier political associations.

Karnes guest-starred in numerous television programs including Gunsmoke, Bonanza, Cheyenne, The Twilight Zone, The Waltons, The Rockford Files, M*A*S*H, The Streets of San Francisco, Alfred Hitchcock Presents, Emergency!, Perry Mason, The Andy Griffith Show, The Fugitive, The Untouchables, Mission: Impossible, and Ironside, among others. He also appeared in numerous films such as Miracle on 34th Street, Trapped, Gentleman's Agreement, Three Husbands, According to Mrs. Hoyle, Half Human, Scudda Hoo! Scudda Hay!, Road House, When My Baby Smiles at Me, Hills of Oklahoma, Stagecoach to Fury, Inside the Walls of Folsom Prison, From Here to Eternity, and Fear No More.

In 1953, Karnes played a lead role in the stage play John Loves Mary in San Francisco, California, leaving the cast to appear in the film From Here to Eternity. In 1959, he starred as Max Fields in the NBC crime drama television series The Lawless Years, starring along with James Gregory. His final credit was from the television film Bogie.

== Death ==
Karnes died on December 4, 1979, of heart failure, at his home in Sherman Oaks, California, at the age of 62.
