= The Devil's Own (1916 film) =

American silent drama film

- Directed by: George Marshall
- Written by: W. B. Pearson
- Produced by: Universal's "Big U" unit
- Starring: Harry Carey
- Distributed by: Universal Pictures
- Release date: August 24, 1916
- Running time: 1 reel
- Country: United States
- Language: Silent with English intertitles

The Devil's Own is a 1916 American silent drama film featuring Harry Carey.

== Cast ==
- Harry Carey as "Shifty"
- Olive Carey as Vera Browning (as Olive Fuller Golden)
- Joe Rickson as Snake Matthews

== See also ==
- List of American films of 1916
