= The Dark Mirror (1920 film) =

1920 film by Charles Giblyn

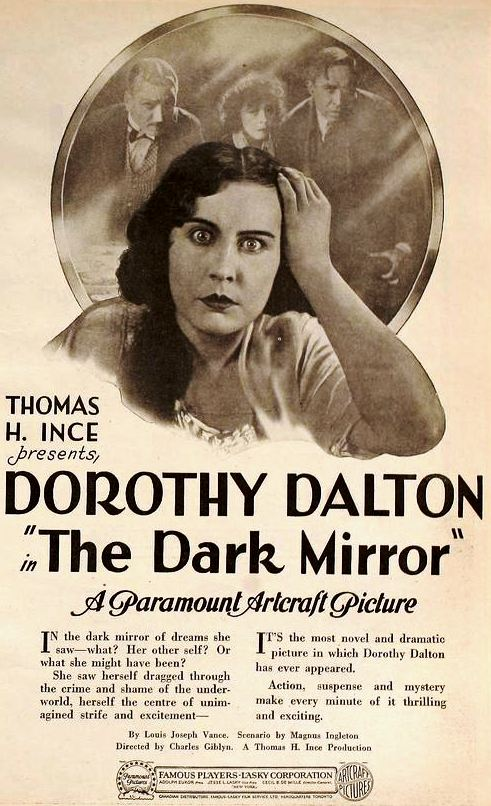
- Ad for film
- Directed by: Charles Giblyn
- Screenplay by: E. Magnus Ingleton
- Based on: The Dark Mirror by Louis Joseph Vance
- Produced by: Thomas H. Ince
- Starring: Dorothy Dalton; Huntley Gordon; Walter D. Nealand; Jessie Arnold; Lucille Carney; Pedro de Cordoba; Donald MacPherson
- Cinematography: John Stumar
- Production company: Famous Players–Lasky Corporation
- Distributed by: Paramount Pictures
- Release date: May 9, 1920
- Running time: 50 minutes
- Country: United States
- Language: Silent (English intertitles)

The Dark Mirror is a 1920 American silent horror-drama film and horror film directed by Charles Giblyn and written by E. Magnus Ingleton, based upon the story of the same name by Louis Joseph Vance. The film stars Dorothy Dalton in a dual role, Huntley Gordon, Walter D. Nealand, Jessie Arnold, Lucille Carney, Pedro de Cordoba, and Donald MacPherson. The film was released on May 9, 1920, by Paramount Pictures. It is listed as Jericho in some film reference guides.

== Plot ==
As described in a film magazine, New York society member Priscilla Maine is troubled by strange dreams in which she vividly sees members of the underworld involved in a murder. She confides this to her admirer, Dr. Philip Fosdick, who undertakes to solve the mystery. As if to make her dreams come true, a gang of thugs mistakes her for Nora, a belle of the Bowery, and kidnaps her.

Nora is known to be gangster Red Carnahan's girl, but is loved by the Spaniard, Mario Gonzales. Mario rescues Nora from Red's clutches, marries her, and brings her to New Jersey. Red and his gang search for them, and when Red discovers the real Nora, he drowns her.

Priscilla is rescued by Mario, who thinks she is his wife Nora, not realizing that Nora has been murdered. Dr. Fosdick is attempting to explain the true circumstances to Mario at his New Jersey retreat when Priscilla looks out the window and sees Red Carnahan on the shore of a nearby lake. She rushes out just as Red is drawing a woman's dead body from the water.

Red is horrified to see Priscilla, an exact counterpart of the dead Nora, and drowns himself in superstitious terror. It turns out that Priscilla's father had married a gypsy woman with whom he had two twin daughters, Nora and Priscilla, and Nora was taken away by the gypsy when she ran away one day.

The mystery resolved, Priscilla consents to wed Dr. Fosdick.

== Cast ==
- Dorothy Dalton as Priscilla Maine/Nora O'Moore
- Huntley Gordon as Dr. Philip Fosdick
- Walter D. Nealand as Red Carnahan
- Jessie Arnold as Inez
- Lucille Carney as Addy
- Pedro de Cordoba as Mario Gonzales
- Donald MacPherson as The Nut
- Bert Starkey as Charlie the Coke

== Preservation ==
An complete print of the film survives in the Library of Congress.

== Reception ==
The film received generally mixed reviews. Camera! The Digest of the Motion Picture Industry wrote on the film saying, "The story holds interest throughout due largely to its theme, psycho analysis. However, it is treated somewhat hazily and the key to he explanation of the plot will remain a secret from the public." While a writer from Motion Picture Herald says, "Mystery, romance, gun-play, quick get-aways and adventure are interwoven as only Vance can weave them into a story, and, through the careful direction of Charles Giblyn, assisted by the cast of well-known screen players, the whole make an absorbing screen drama that merits attention.” The film's theme was something discussed by many, the Alaska Daily Empire says the theme was "unusual and absorbing"
