= Joe Rickson =

American actor (1880–1958)

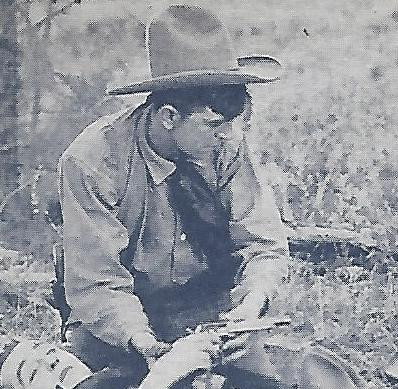
- Rickson in 1920s
- Born: Oscar Erickson; September 6, 1880; Clearcreek, Montana, U.S.
- Died: January 8, 1958 (aged 77); Los Angeles, California, U.S.
- Occupation: Actor
- Years active: 1913–1945

Joe Rickson (born Oscar Erickson; September 6, 1880 – January 8, 1958) was an American actor of the silent era. He appeared in 90 films between 1913 and 1945. He was born in Springfield, Massachusetts, and died in Los Angeles, California.

== Partial filmography ==
- The Price of Crime (1914)
- The Night Riders (1916, Short) - The Apache Kid
- The Wedding Guest (1916, Short) – Jose Del Barra
- The Three Godfathers (1916) – Rusty Conners
- The Committee on Credentials (1916, Short) – Clem
- For the Love of a Girl (1916, Short) – Cliff Buckley
- Love's Lariat (1916) – Cowboy
- A Woman's Eyes (1916, Short) – Buzzard
- The Devil's Own (1916, Short) – Snake Matthews
- Cavanaugh of the Forest Rangers (1918) – Neil Ballard
- The Home Trail (1918) – Blackie
- Baree, Son of Kazan (1918) – Perriot
- Cactus Crandall (1918) – Mendoza
- Go-Get-Em Garringer (1919)
- The Little Boss (1919) – Pete Farley
- Outlawed (1921) – Tom Benson
- Flower of the North (1921) – Pierre
- The Purple Riders (1922) – Rudolph Myers
- Brass Commandments (1923) – Tularosa
- Pioneer Trails (1923) – The Sheriff
- Rough Ridin' (1924) – Jack Wells
- Code of the Wilderness (1924) – Tom Chavis
- Rip Roarin' Roberts (1924) – 'Hawk' Andrews
- Fast Fightin' (1925) – The Man
- Beyond the Border (1925) – Blackie Cullen – Deputy
- Riders of the Purple Sage (1925) – Henchman Dave Slack (uncredited)
- A Two-Fisted Sheriff (1925) – George Rivers
- Baree, Son of Kazan (1925) – Pierre Eustach
- The Human Tornado (1925) – Tom Crowley
- The Bad Lands (1925) – Charlie Squirrel
- Action Galore (1925) – Gil Kruger
- Rawhide (1926) – Strobel
- With Davy Crockett at the Fall of the Alamo (1926) – Colonel William B. Travis
- The Flying Horseman (1926) – Henchman #2
- The Buckaroo Kid (1926) – McIntyre (uncredited)
- Whispering Sage (1927)
- Two-Gun of the Tumbleweed (1927) – Darrel (uncredited)
- Border Blackbirds (1927) – Suderman
- The Devil's Double (1927) – Carl Blackburn
- Land of the Lawless (1927) – 'Brush' Gallagher
- A Trick of Hearts (1928) – Black Jack
- The Code of the Scarlet (1928) – Pete
- Yellow Contraband (1928) – Pierre Dufresne
- The Drifter (1929) – Hank
- The Lariat Kid (1929) – Tony
- The Lone Star Ranger (1930) – Henchman #2
- Trails of Danger (1930) – U.S. Marshal Bartlett
- Not Exactly Gentlemen (1931) – Henchman (uncredited)
- A Son of the Plains (1931) – Deputy (uncredited)
- Wild Horse (1931) – Deputy Clark
- Heritage of the Desert (1932) – Joe (uncredited)
- Sundown Rider (1932) – Bates (uncredited)
- Fargo Express (1933) – Lynn – Gambler Who Chases Mort
- Elinor Norton (1934) – Ranch Hand (uncredited)
- The Prescott Kid (1934) – Townsman (uncredited)
- Les Misérables (1935) – Gendarme (uncredited)
- Under the Pampas Moon (1935) – Bazan's Gaucho (uncredited)
- Bar 20 Rides Again (1935) – Herb Layton
- Escape from Devil's Island (1935) – Guard (uncredited)
- Gallant Defender (1935) – Soap Creek Smith (uncredited)
- Song of the Saddle (1936) – Second Stagecoach Driver (uncredited)
- Three on the Trail (1936) – Gabby (uncredited)
- Hopalong Cassidy Returns (1936) – Henchman Buck
- Arizona Legion (1939) – Dakota – Henchman (uncredited)
- Stagecoach (1939) – Ike Plummer (uncredited)
- The Oklahoma Kid (1939) – Homesteader (uncredited)
- Prairie Law (1940) – Jake – Henchman (uncredited)
- Triple Justice (1940) – Henchman Luke Grimes (uncredited)
- Girl Rush (1944) – 4-Up Driver (uncredited)
- Flame of Barbary Coast (1945) – Dealer (uncredited)
- West of the Pecos (1945) – Joe – Townsman (uncredited)
- The Sun Shines Bright (1953) – Dink (uncredited)
