= Leaves in the Storm =

- Directed by: Lois Weber
- Produced by: Rex Motion Picture Company
- Starring: Lois Weber; Phillips Smalley
- Distributed by: Universal Film Manufacturing Company
- Release date: October 20, 1912
- Running time: 1 reel
- Country: USA
- Language: Silent..English titles

Leaves in the Storm is a 1912 silent film short directed by and starring Lois Weber. It was produced by Rex Motion Picture Company and distributed by the then new Universal Film Manufacturing Company.

It is preserved at the Library of Congress

== Cast ==
- Phillips Smalley - Husband
- Lois Weber - Wife
- Cleo Ridgely -
