= According to Mrs. Hoyle =

1951 film directed by Jean Yarbrough

- Theatrical release poster
- Directed by: Jean Yarbrough
- Screenplay by: Scott Darling; Barney Gerard
- Based on: Mrs. Hoyle and the Hotel Royalstom by Jean Z. Owen
- Produced by: Barney Gerard
- Starring: Spring Byington; Anthony Caruso; Tanis Chandler; Brett King; Stephen Chase; Robert Karnes
- Cinematography: Harry Neumann
- Edited by: Roy Livingston
- Production company: Monogram Pictures
- Distributed by: Monogram Pictures
- Release date: April 21, 1951
- Running time: 60 minutes
- Country: United States
- Language: English

According to Mrs. Hoyle is a 1951 American second feature crime film directed by Jean Yarbrough, written by Scott Darling and Barney Gerard and starring Spring Byington, Anthony Caruso, Tanis Chandler and Brett King. It was released on May 20, 1951, by Monogram Pictures. The title is a reference to the common phrase "according to Hoyle".

== Plot ==
Retired schoolteacher Mrs. Hoyle, recognized for her reformation of young men, has lived at a second-rate hotel for 25 years when gang leader Morganti buys the hotel. Morganti, who wants to abandon his life of crime, evicts many residents, but Mrs. Hoyle convinces him to allow her and dancehall girl Angela Brown to remain. Morganti's henchman Eddie Slattery falls in love with Angela and recognizes Mrs. Hoyle as his long-lost mother, but he does not disclose his knowledge. Mrs. Hoyle does not recognize Eddie because she has not seen him since her husband James, whom she thinks was a traveling salesman, mysteriously left her years earlier, taking their young son with him.

At first, members of Morganti's gang are reluctant to adapt to their leader's change of heart; however, under Mrs. Hoyle's influence, they abandon their evil ways, except for Harry Rogan. Defying Morganti's orders, Rogan plans to rob a local grocery store on the same night that the new hotel restaurant is holding its grand opening. He tries to enlist Eddie as his accomplice, and Eddie feels obligated to participate because Rogan had saved his life during a previous holdup. After the robbery, Eddie does not want the stolen money and refuses to allow Rogan to disclose to him where he has hidden it; the loot is inside a fur coat in Mrs. Hoyle's closet.

With the help of the grocery store's night watchman, who identifies Rogan, police detective Pat Dennison accuses Morganti of planning the robbery. When Eddie sees the watchman with Dennison, he tells Rogan and they try to escape. As the police chase after them, Rogan is shot and killed and Eddie is knocked unconscious. Mrs. Hoyle is arrested after the money and jewels are found in her room. She denies knowledge of the money and claims that the jewels were inexpensive presents from her husband. Morganti pays Mrs. Hoyle's bail, and Dennison does not believe that she was involved in the robbery, but the prosecuting attorney insists on trying her.

The trial opens while Eddie is still in a coma. During Mrs. Hoyle's testimony, the prosecuting attorney confronts her with the fact that she possesses valuable jewels and reveals that her husband was a convicted jewel thief who had died in prison. Mrs. Hoyle is shattered by the revelation and feels faint, prompting the judge to call a recess. Eddie regains consciousness and learns of the charges against Mrs. Hoyle. Despite his weakened condition, Eddie asks Dennison and Morganti to take him to court to testify. As he confesses to the crime, he inadvertently reveals that he is Mrs. Hoyle's son. The charges against Mrs. Hoyle are dismissed, but Eddie faces several years in prison. Now reunited with her son, Mrs. Hoyle assures him that, after prison, he can start a new life.

== Cast ==
- Spring Byington as Mrs. Harriet Hoyle
- Anthony Caruso as Morganti
- Tanis Chandler as Angela Brown
- Brett King as Eddie Slattery
- Stephen Chase as Judge Guthrie
- Robert Karnes as Harry 'Chip' Rogan
- James Flavin as Prosecuting Attorney
- Paul Bryar as Willie
- Tris Coffin as Pat Dennison
- Charles Williams as Charlie
- Harry Lauter as Gordon Warren
- Michael Whalen as Rev. Haverford
- Leander de Cordova as Pastor J. Berland
- Wilbur Mack as Mr. Russ
- Don C. Harvey as Detective
- Rory Mallinson as Detective
- Frank Jaquet as Watchman
- Marcelle Imhof as Court Clerk
- Baron James Lichter as Bailiff
- Joey Ray as Policeman in Hospital
- Ted Stanhope as Clerk of Court

== Release ==
The film's first general showing occurred on April 21, 1951, in Hartford, Connecticut as a second feature to Father's Little Dividend.

- According to Mrs. Hoyle at IMDb
