= Action Galore =

A 1925 advertisement quoting Buddy Roosevelt promoting his upcoming series of eight five-reel films.

Action Galore is an American silent, Western melodrama film, starring Buddy Roosevelt, and produced in 1925. It was part of a series of eight five-reel films, titled Rough Riding Romances. The entire series featured Roosevelt as a main actor, and Action Galore was the third film in it. The film was produced by Action Pictures Inc, and was associated with Weiss Brothers’ Artclass Pictures Corporation. The film was written by Ralph Cummins, and directed by Robert Eddy.

== Plot ==
Action Galore follows ranger Bud Laurie, who is seeking out Gil Kruger, an escaped convict. While on this mission, Bud gets mistaken for a bandit inside the shack of Luke Mclean, and subsequently gets trapped inside of it. Kruger later captures a woman, Betty Mclean, who is Luke's daughter, and Betty and Bud are then held captive together. Eventually the two of them escape from the cabin they are being held in, after it is set on fire. Later in the film, after Bud and Betty escape from the burning cabin. Bud later goes to a party taking place at Kruger's home, where he gets recognized by one of Kruger's men, Spike Carney. A fight follows soon after Bud is recognized, where he defeats Kruger, and then takes him into custody. Action Galore ends with Luke Mclean agreeing to let Betty marry Bud. The film also features scenes of Bud pursuing Kruger all over the country, and there are several stunts and fight sequences in said pursuit.

== Cast ==
- Buddy Roosevelt as Bud Laurie, a ranger pursuing an escaped convict.
- Toy Gallagher as Betty Mclean, the daughter of Luke Mclean.
- Charles Williams as Luke Mclean, father to Betty Mclean.
- Joe Rickson as Gil Kruger, an escaped convict.
- Jack O'Brien as Spike Carney, one of Kruger's men.
- Raye Hampton as Ma Kruger.
- Ruth Royce as Kate Kruger.

== Production ==
A 1925 advertisement, published by Weiss Brothers’ Artclass Pictures Corporation for its upcoming season, announced Rough Riding Romances as a series which would be made as a follow up to Roosevelt's 1924 films. Exhibitors' Trade Review had reported that the filming for Action Galore had been completed by Robert Eddy in August of 1925. Action Galore was also identified as the third of eight five-reel films, all starring Roosevelt.

== Distribution ==
Rough Riding Romances were listed in The Film Daily Yearbook of Motion Pictures as part of the Weiss Brothers’ Artclass Pictures Corporation offerings for 1925 and 1926. This publication listed Weiss Brothers’ Artclass Pictures Corporation as the distributor, and they also promoted the films. The 1925 programme also listed other series alongside Rough Riding Romances, that were also being advertised.

== Reception ==
A review of Action Galore was published in Motion Picture News, by George T. Pardy, where Pardy makes note that the film is worthy of its name, saying that it “lives up to its title.” The consistent action throughout the film was also positively commented on. These action scenes were highlighted, such as the escape from the burning cabin, “a cross-country hunt,” the fight with Kruger and Roosevelt's stunts. Pardy also held praise for the outdoor shot scenes. The review comments on the plot, calling it familiar, and then goes on to say that the action throughout holds viewer attention.

In Movie Age, the film was described in an exhibitor comment as “a real western” in which its action was praised, and notably mentioned that the film had more action than a serial. The comment was written by S.M. White from the American Theatre in Keytesville, Missouri, who also encouraged people to watch the film.

Another exhibitor report, published in Exhibitors Herald, described the film as “just a fair Western.” This review was given by Andrew Rapp, from the Theatorium in Emlenton, Pennsylvania, where he also stated that the film would be suitable for general audiences.
