= Rex Motion Picture Company =

American film production company

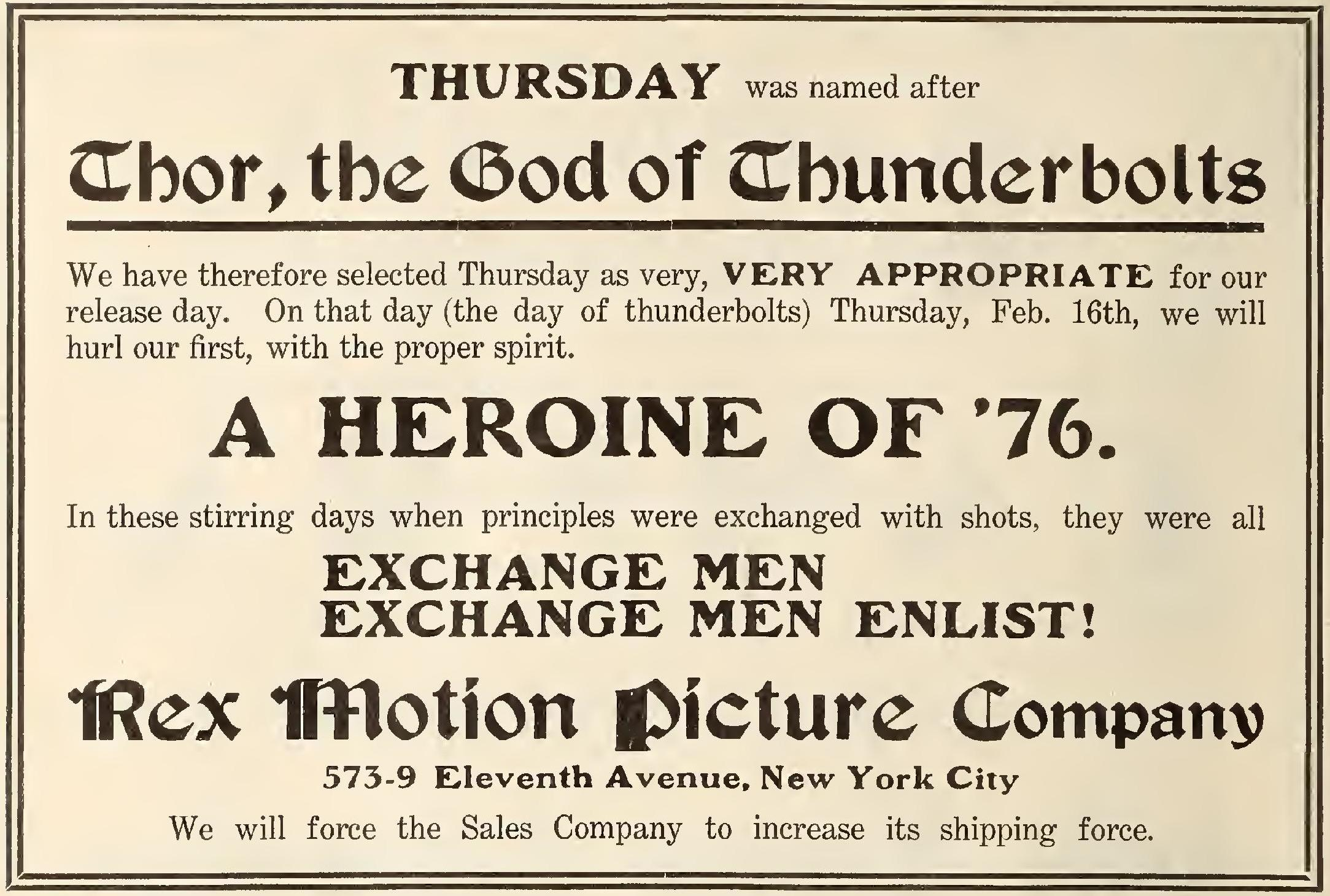
Rex Motion Picture Company ad in Moving Picture News, 1911

Rex Motion Picture Company was an early film production company in the United States.

== History ==
After Edwin S. Porter's short-lived Defender Film Company failed, The Rex Motion Picture Company was established by Edwin S. Porter, Joseph Engel, and William Swanson. Rex, based at 573–579 11th Avenue, New York City. produced dozens of films from 1910 into 1917. It adopted a crown emblem.

Lois Weber established herself in the film industry at Rex.

Rex acquired Gem Motion Picture Company film properties and released them in 1912 under its own banner and later Universal's. Rex was one of the studios that combined to form Universal Pictures under Carl Laemmle's leadership.

== Filmography ==
- By the Light of the Moon (film) (1911)
- The Vagabond (1911), a drama
- Sherlock Holmes, Jr. (1911)
- Her Way (1911)
- The Artist Financier (1911), a drama
- The White Red Man (1911), drama
- The Colonel's Daughter (1911), a drama
- Castles in the Air (1911) a comedy
- Leaves in the Storm (1912), extant
- The Fine Feathers (1912), extant
- A Japanese Idyll (1912), extant
- The Honor of the Family (1912), lost
- Suspense, extant
- Symphony of Souls (1914)
- The Heart of the Hills (1914)
- Alas and Alack (1915), partial print is extant
- All for Peggy (1915), lost
- The Stronger Mind (1915), lost
- Cross Purposes (1916)
- Unmasked (1917)
