= William Canfield (actor) =

American actor

William Canfield was an American actor on stage and screen known for portraying villains. He was in the 1915 serial The Broken Coin and the 1918 war propaganda film Why America Will Win.

== Filmography ==
- The Little Girl of the Attic (1915)
- Across the Rio Grande (1915)
- The Broken Coin (1915) as Gorgas the Outlaw
- The College Orphan (1915) as Mr. Brentwood
- A Knight of the Range (1916) as Gentleman Dick
- The Stampede in the Night (1916)
- Lee Blount Goes Home (1916)
- The Wedding Guest (1916)
- The Shadow (1916)
- The Woman He Feared (1916)
- Gloriana (1916)
- The Devil's Bandwagon (1916)
- Cross Purposes (1916) as The Grand Duke
- Love Never Dies (1916)
- The Voice on the Wire (1917) as William Grimsby
- Why America Will Win (1918)
- Berlin Via America (1918), a serial
