= Tanis Chandler =

French-American actress (1924–2006)

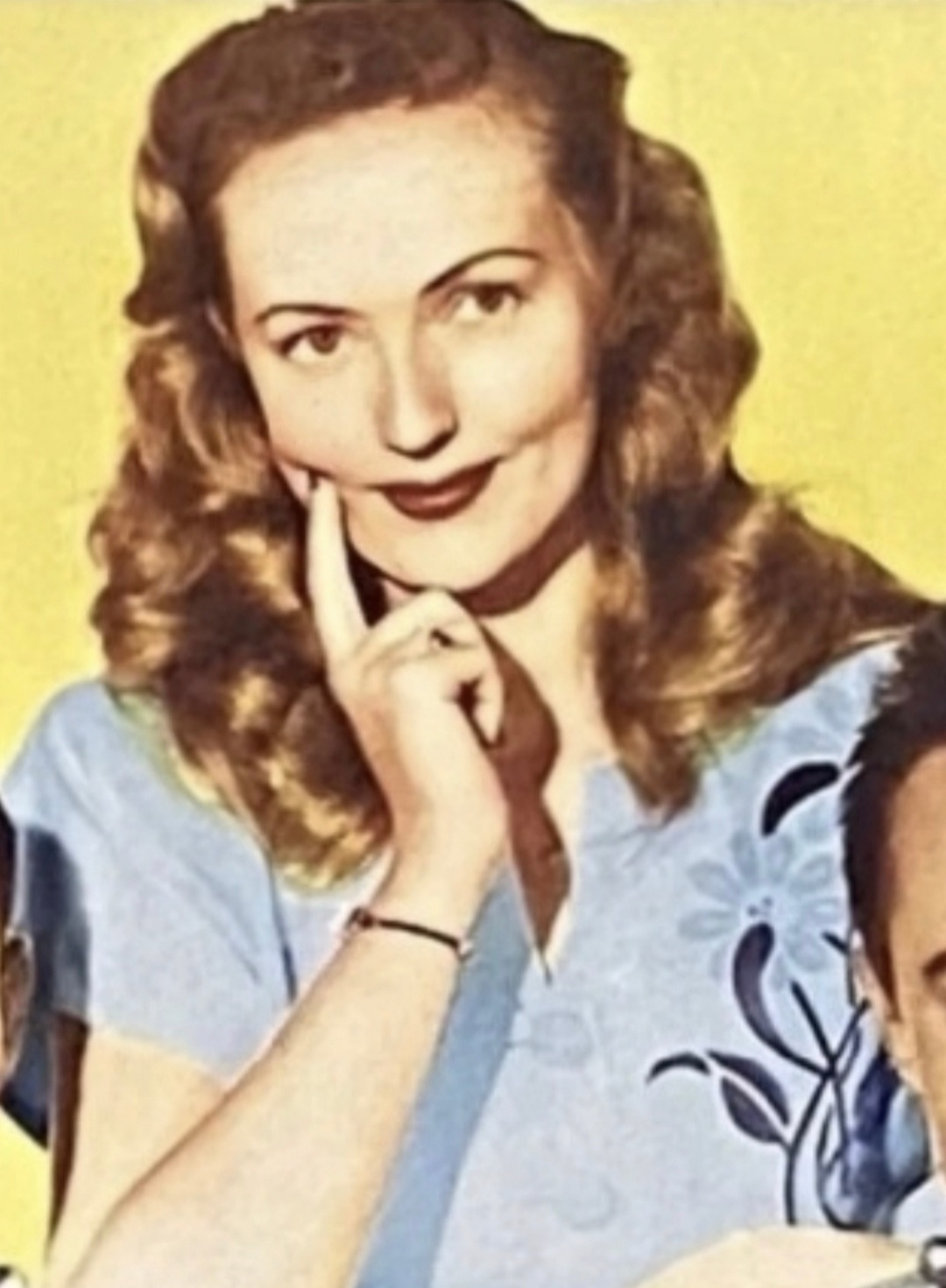
- Chandler in The Spirit of West Point (1947)
- Born: Tannis Anne Goldthwaite; August 29, 1924; Nantes, France
- Died: May 7, 2006 (aged 81); Sedona, Arizona, U.S.
- Other names: Robert Archer
- Occupation: Actress
- Years active: 1943–1952
- Spouse(s): Paul Hills (m. 1948; died 19??)

Tanis Chandler (born Tannis Anne Goldthwaite; August 29, 1924 – May 7, 2006) was a French-born American film actress. She is perhaps best known to today's audiences as the ingenue in low-budget features with The Bowery Boys and Charlie Chan, and for incidental roles in major Warner Bros. features.

== Early years ==
Chandler was born in Nantes, France. Her father was musician Chandler Goldthwaite, who was billed as Rex Chandler for his performances of popular music. Her mother was Leon Lorfray De Rousier. Chandler was educated initially by private tutors in Paris and, after the family moved to the United States in 1936, at the Westlake School for Girls in Los Angeles. After her father's illness interrupted his work on radio programs, she became a model to help with finances.

== Acting ==
In 1940, Chandler acted in a production of Prison Without Bars at the Troupers theater. Her film debut came in Devotion (1943), and she appeared in Cinderella Jones (1946), George White's Scandals and Wanderer of the Wasteland. She also used her fluency in French and Spanish to dub parts for foreign versions of approximately 30 films.

Chandler pulled off a hoax on film executives when she obtained a part in The Desert Song (1943) by pretending to be a male, Robert Archer. A wire-service news story distributed nationwide explained, "She was aided in the deception by the fact that she and most of the other players were clad in flowing robes and burnooses ..." Her success was such that the casting office sent Archer for work in another 1944 film, My Reputation (released 1946). That venture ended, however, when a scene called for being shirtless while mowing a lawn. At that point, Chandler admitted to being a female, ending her male-impersonation efforts. Her explanation for the hoax was that studio executives frequently complained about a lack of men, and she hoped for a better opportunity for roles in films.

In 1945 RKO Radio Pictures signed her for one year; she worked mostly in budget features for staff producer Herman Schlom, and generally appeared as hostesses, waitresses, and showgirls. Described as an "up-and-coming Hollywood starlet", Chandler was featured on the cover of Parade magazine's April 7, 1946, issue. She then signed with Monogram Pictures for more prominent roles in "B" features, in which she sometimes spoke with a French accent. Her highest-profile film is probably the 1946 Warner Bros. feature The Big Sleep.

== Personal life ==
Tanis Chandler journeyed to France in 1949, where she was hired by a production crew making the multi-part feature Return to Life; she played a British army captain.

In October 1949, Chandler married Paul Mills. Chandler worked for a stock brokerage firm for a year, and she and her mother operated a kindergarten in which she taught when she was not working in films. She returned to Monogram for one more assignment in 1951, and to RKO for her final film, released in 1952.

She died in May 2006 at the age of 81.

== Filmography ==
Year	Title	Role	Notes
1943	Higher and Higher	Debutante	Uncredited
1944	Janie	High School Girl	Uncredited
1944	Music for Millions	Orchestra Member	Uncredited
1945	Wanderer of the Wasteland	Chito's Friend	Uncredited
1945	George White's Scandals	Showgirl	Uncredited
1945	Cornered	Airline Hostess	Uncredited
1945	Dick Tracy	Miss Stanley	Uncredited
1946	The Madonna's Secret	Singer	Uncredited
1946	Cinderella Jones	Waitress	Uncredited
1946	Devotion	French Student	Uncredited
1946	Ding Dong Williams	Hostess	Uncredited
1946	The Catman of Paris	Yvette	
1946	Shadows Over Chinatown	Mary Conover	
1946	The Big Sleep	Waitress	Uncredited
1946	Spook Busters	Mignon Moreno	
1946	Affairs of Geraldine	Liza Jane Dennis	
1946	The Trap	Adelaide	
1947	Lured	Lucy Barnard	
1947	The Spirit of West Point	Mildred	
1948	16 Fathoms Deep	Simi	
1949	Return to Life	Capitaine Betty	(segment 2 : "Le retour d'Antoine")
1951	According to Mrs. Hoyle	Angela Brown	
1952	At Sword's Point	Mimi	Uncredited, (final film role)
