= Brett King =

American actor

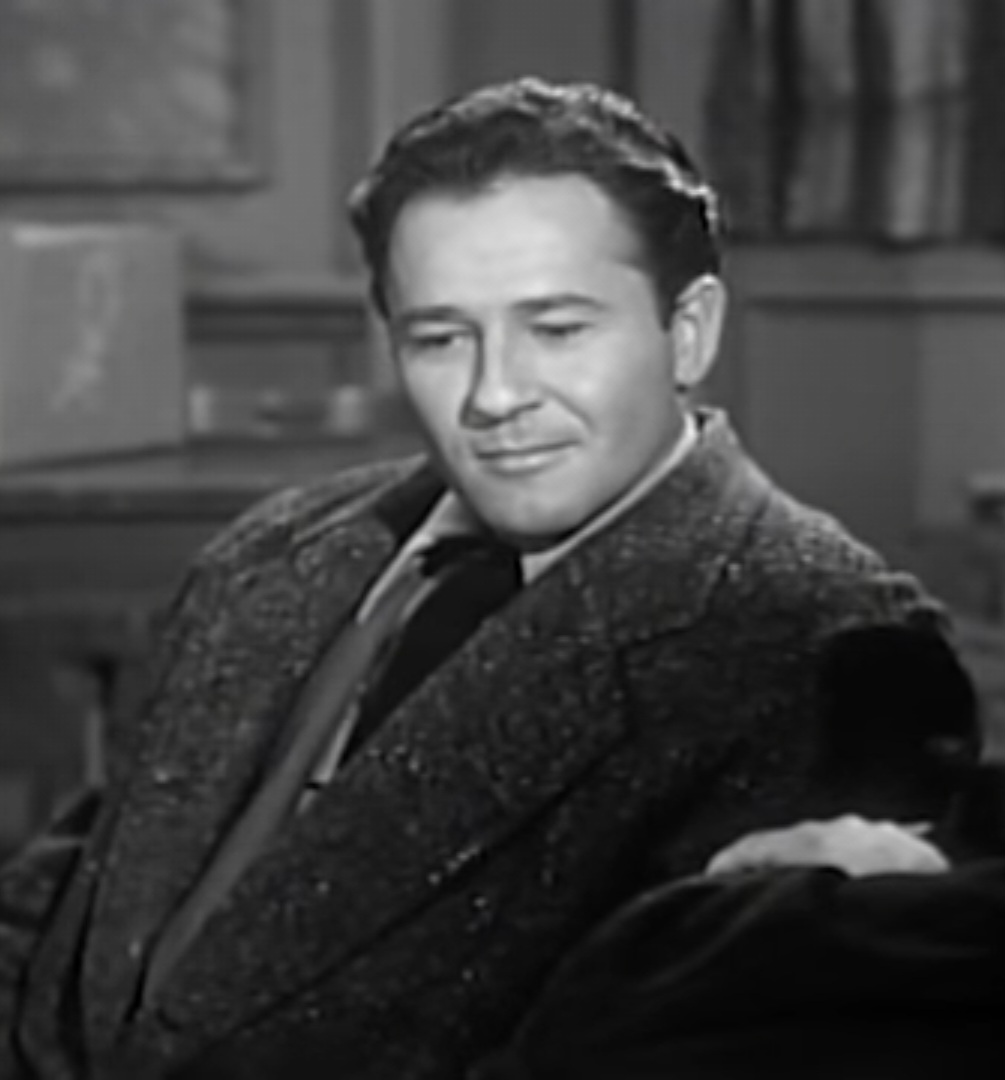
- King in an episode of The Public Defender (1954)
- Born: Bertell W. King, Jr. December 29, 1920
- Died: January 14, 1999 (aged 78); Palm Beach, Florida, U.S.
- Occupations: Actor; businessman
- Years active: 1949–1967
- Spouse: Sharon L. Van Howten

Brett King (born Bertell W. King, Jr.; December 29, 1920 – January 14, 1999) was an American actor who performed in films and on television between 1949 and 1967.

== Early life and film career ==
King attended the American Theatre Wing in New York.

He served as a fighter pilot in the United States Army Air Corps during World War II and was awarded the Purple Heart and the Distinguished Flying Cross. According to King's military enlistment records, he had graduated from high school and had worked as a general office clerk prior to joining the army in January 1942, just a month after Japan's attack on Pearl Harbor.

A few years after his discharge from the army, King began acting in feature films in Hollywood, where he was cast in no fewer than 13 films between 1949 and 1954. His first role was as the character Lieutenant Teiss in the World War II film Battleground (1949).

== Television career ==
In 1954, King was cast as Lieutenant Charles B. Gatewood in the episode "Geronimo" of the syndicated series Stories of the Century, starring and narrated by Jim Davis. King also performed in a supporting role as a cavalry trooper in 11 episodes of the syndicated 1958–1959 television series Mackenzie's Raiders, set in the 1870s, with Richard Carlson as the historical Colonel Ranald Mackenzie at Fort Clark in southwestern Texas.

In 1960, he played Cassidy in "The Devil's Due", an episode on another Western anthology series, Death Valley Days.

King performed as well in five episodes of Wagon Train between 1961 and 1963 and in four episodes each of CBS's Gunsmoke, Dick Powell's Zane Grey Theater, NBC's Bat Masterson, and on the contemporary crime drama Dragnet. He appeared twice on The Roy Rogers Show, The Life and Legend of Wyatt Earp, Tombstone Territory, and Johnny Ringo; and once on The Adventures of Kit Carson, Shotgun Slade, Black Saddle, Law of the Plainsman, Lawman, Laramie, The Virginian, and Yancy Derringer, in the latter as the bandit Jesse James in the episode "Outlaw at Liberty".

Other series in which King performed include Alcoa Premiere, Whirlybirds, Rescue 8, Tightrope!, Men into Space, Lock-Up, Rescue 8, Harbor Command, The Silent Service, and Highway Patrol. His last acting appearance was in the role of Major Jackson on ABC's The Green Hornet, in that series' two-part 1967 finale "Invasion from Outer Space."

== Filmography ==
Year	Title	Role	Notes
1949	Battleground	Lt. Teiss	
1950	Side Street	Pigeon Man	Uncredited
1950	Father Makes Good	Steve Emory	
1950	The Big Hangover	Intern	Uncredited
1950	State Penitentiary	Al 'Kid' Beaumont	
1951	Operation Pacific	Lt. Ernie Stark	Uncredited
1951	Payment on Demand	Phil Polanski	
1951	A Yank in Korea	Milo Pagano	
1951	According to Mrs. Hoyle	Eddie Slattery	
1951	Flying Leathernecks	1st Lt. Ernie Stark	
1951	The Racket	Joe Scanlon	
1951	Purple Heart Diary	Lt. Rocky Castro	
1954	Jesse James vs. the Daltons	Joe Branch	
