= The Broken Coin =

1915 film

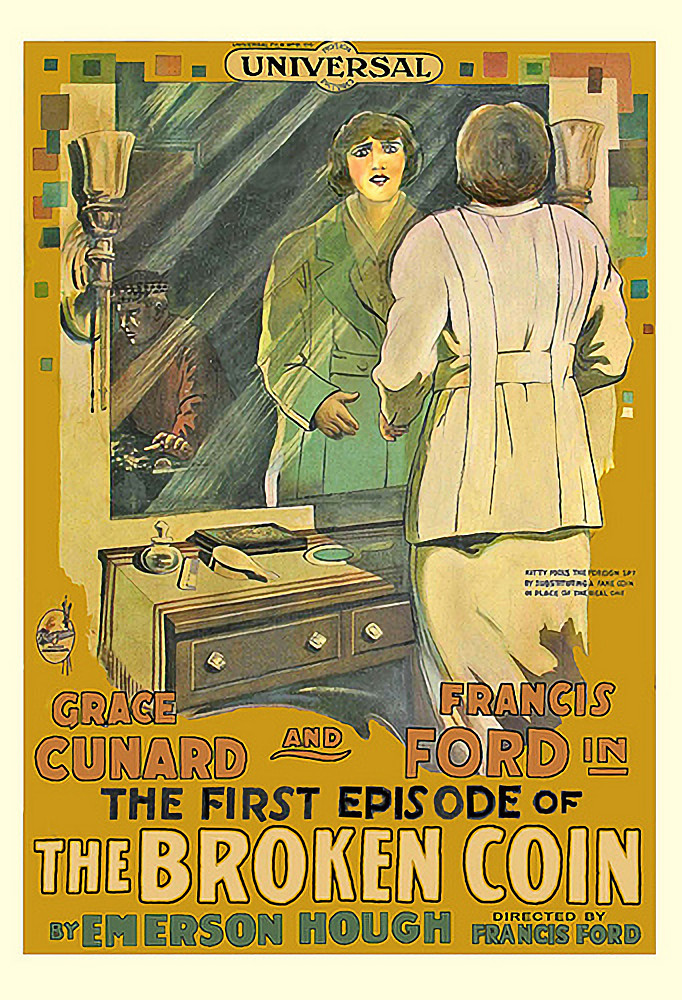
- Film poster
- Directed by: Francis Ford
- Written by: Grace Cunard; Emerson Hough
- Starring: Grace Cunard; Francis Ford
- Cinematography: R. E. Irish; Harry McGuire Stanley
- Distributed by: Universal Film Manufacturing Co.
- Release date: June 21, 1915
- Running time: 440 minutes (22 episodes)
- Country: United States
- Language: Silent with English intertitles

The Broken Coin is a 1915 American adventure-mystery film serial directed by Francis Ford. This serial is presumed to be lost.

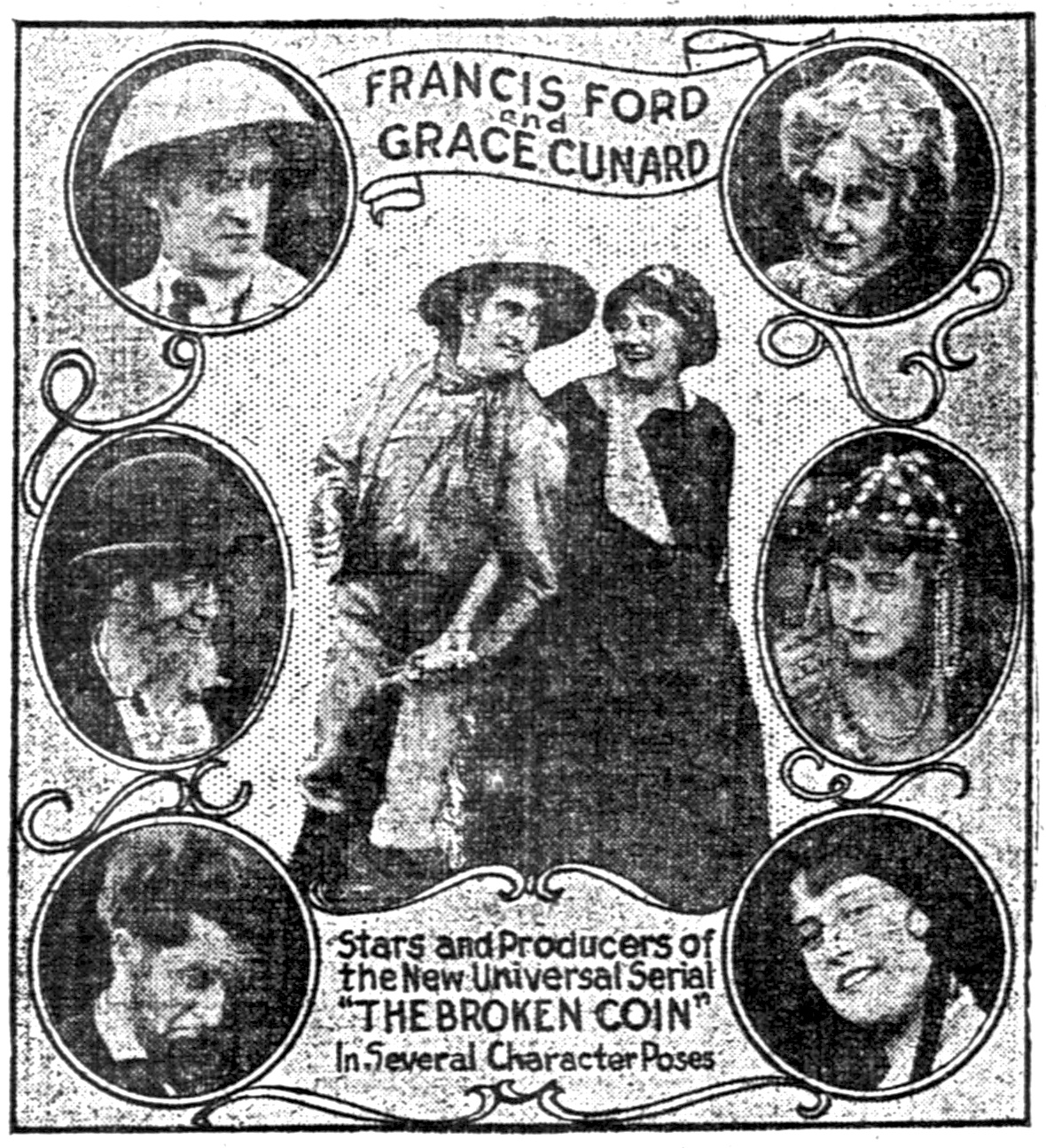
From an article in a newspaper.

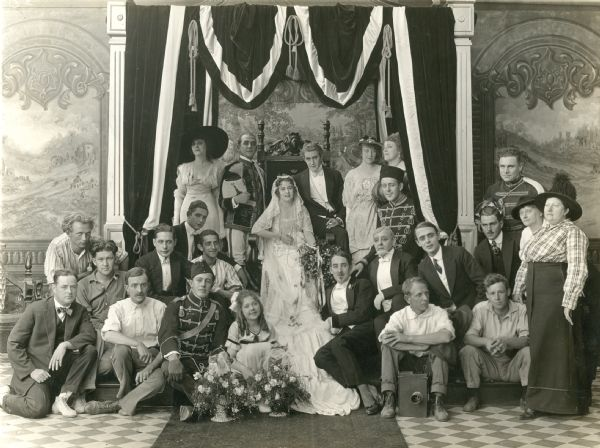
Production still of the cast and crew of The Broken Coin with Cunard and Francis Ford together (rear center) on throne. A cameraman, likely Harry McGuire Stanley, is sitting (front right) with a Pathé film camera between his feet.

== Cast ==
- Grace Cunard - Kitty Gray
- Francis Ford - Count Frederick
- Eddie Polo - Roleau
- Harry Schumm - King Michael II
- Ernest Shields - Count Sacchio
- John Ford - Sacchio's Accomplice (as Jack Ford)
- W.C. Canfield - Gorgas the Outlaw
- Reese Gardiner - The Apache
- Doc Crane - Pawnbroker
- Harry Mann - Servant
- Victor Goss - Servant (as Vic Goss)
- Lew Short - Prime Minister (as Lewis Short)
- George Utell - Henchman (as G.J. Uttal)
- Bert Wilson - Confidante
- Mina Cunard - King's Sweetheart
- Carl Laemmle - Editor-in-Chief
- Jack Holt - Captain Williams
- Mark Fenton - King of Grahaffen
- John George- uncredited

== Chapter titles ==
1. The Broken Coin
2. The Satan of the Sands
3. When the Throne Rocked
4. The Face at the Window
5. The Underground Foe
6. A Startling Discovery
7. Between Two Fires
8. The Prison in the Palace
9. Room 22
10. Cornered
11. The Clash of Arms
12. A Cry in the Dark
13. War
14. On the Battlefield
15. Either
16. The Deluge
17. Kitty in Danger
18. The Castaways
19. The Underground City
20. The Sacred Fire
21. Between Two Fires
22. A Timely Rescue
23. An American Queen

== See also ==
- List of film serials
- List of film serials by studio
- List of lost films
