= Spook Busters =

1946 film by William Beaudine

- Theatrical poster
- Directed by: William Beaudine
- Written by: Edmond Seward; Tim Ryan
- Produced by: Jan Grippo
- Starring: Leo Gorcey; Huntz Hall; Bobby Jordan; William Benedict; Gabriel Dell
- Cinematography: Harry Neumann
- Edited by: William Austin
- Music by: Edward J. Kay
- Color process: Black and white
- Distributed by: Monogram Pictures
- Release date: August 24, 1946
- Running time: 68 minutes
- Language: English

Spook Busters is a 1946 American comedy horror film, directed by William Beaudine and starring the comedy team of The Bowery Boys. It is the fourth film in the series of forty eight.

In the film, the Boys are working as pest control agents. They are tasked with removing ghosts from a seemingly abandoned mansion. It is actually inhabited by a mad scientist, who wants to use of the Boys in a brain transplant operation.

== Plot ==
All of the boys have just graduated from school where they learned exterminating, except for Sach who flunked out. They set up their new business in a corner of Louie's Sweet Shop and quickly get a job to remove ghosts from an old abandoned mansion. Upon arrival they discover weird events taking place, such as lights turning on when a match is lit, and a disappearing organ. Soon they discover that these events are not the actions of ghosts, but of a mad scientist who is conducting illegal experiments in the basement.

Upon encountering the scientist, Sach quickly becomes part of the experiment. The scientist wants to perform a brain transplant operation, which will transfer part of his brain to a gorilla. A fight ensues and, after the cops arrive and apprehend the criminals, the boys find themselves at the police station, telling the story of what happened. Louie then calls them and tells Slip that the mouse in his store "had puppies". The boys quickly leave the police station to go to their next job.

== Cast ==
=== The Bowery Boys ===
- Leo Gorcey as Terrance 'Slip' Mahoney
- Huntz Hall as Sach
- Bobby Jordan as Bobby
- William Benedict as Whitey
- David Gorcey as Chuck

=== Remaining cast ===
- Gabriel Dell as Gabe
- Bernard Gorcey as Louie Dumbrowski
- Douglass Dumbrille as Dr. Coslow
- Tanis Chandler as Mignon
- Maurice Cass as Dr. Bender
- Charles Middleton as Stiles
- Richard Alexander as Ivan

== Production ==
Gabriel Dell makes his first appearance of the series, playing an old member of the gang who just returned from a stint in the United States Navy and newly married to a French woman.

The film was made under the working title Ghost Busters.

== Home media ==
Released on VHS by Warner Brothers on September 1, 1998.

Warner Archives released the film on made-to-order DVD in the United States as part of "The Bowery Boys, Volume Two" on April 9, 2013.

== See also ==
- Lonesome Ghosts, a 1937 Disney short with a similar premise

Preceded by Bowery Bombshell; 1946	'The Bowery Boys' movies 1946-1958	Succeeded by Mr. Hex; 1946
