= Olive Carey =

American actress (1896–1988)

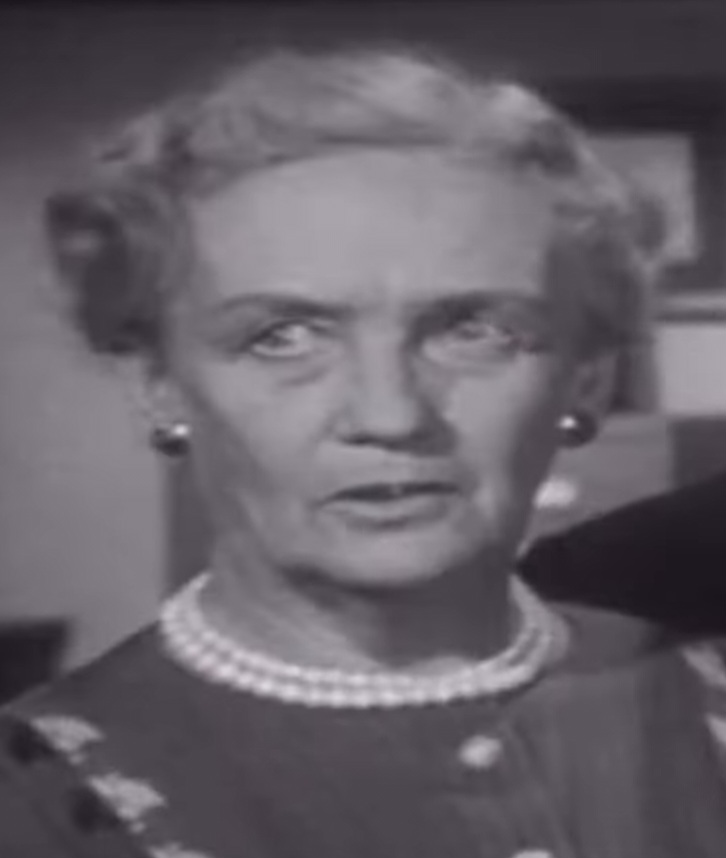
- Carey in an episode of Lock-Up (1960)
- Born: Olive Fuller Golden; January 31, 1896; New York City, U.S.
- Died: March 13, 1988 (aged 92); Carpinteria, California, U.S.
- Occupation: Actress
- Years active: 1913–1966
- Spouse: Harry Carey (m. 1920; died 1947)
- Children: 2, including Harry Carey Jr.
- Father: George Fuller Golden

Olive Carey (born Olive Fuller Golden; January 31, 1896 – March 13, 1988) was an American film and television actress, and the mother of actor Harry Carey Jr.

== Early life ==
Carey was born Olive Fuller Golden in New York City, the daughter of Ada (Maxwell), who was from Surrey, England, and George Fuller Golden (originally George Michael Fuller), a vaudeville entertainer.

In 1912, her father died, "leaving a wife and four children destitute." She had a sister, Ruth Fuller Golden, who also acted in films.

== Career ==
=== Films 1910s to 1950s ===
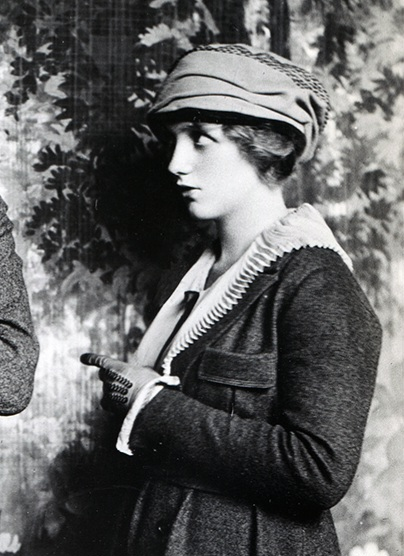
Olive Carey in 1919.

Carey's screen debut was in Sorrowful Jones (1913). She next acted in Tess of the Storm Country (1914). (An obituary indicates that the name of her initial film was The Sorrowful Shore.) She appeared in more than 50 films, mostly Westerns, including Gunfight at the O.K. Corral, often playing tough tomboy parts.

=== Television and films 1950s and later ===
In 1956, Carey guest starred in the episode "Death in the Snow" of NBC's anthology series, The Joseph Cotten Show. In 1957 and 1958, Carey played Elsie, the live-in housekeeper, on the CBS sitcom Mr. Adams and Eve, which starred the then real-life married acting couple, Howard Duff and Ida Lupino. She subsequently appeared on the CBS sitcom Dennis the Menace, starring Jay North.

About this time, Carey was cast on two NBC Westerns Cimarron City, with George Montgomery and John Smith, and The Restless Gun, starring John Payne. In 1960 and 1961, Carey performed the role of Casey, Macdonald Carey's (no relation) secretary, in several episodes of the television series Lock-Up.

On November 7, 1961, Carey played Ma Tolliver, the owner of a former stagecoach stop, in the episode "Deadly Is the Night" of NBC's Laramie Western series. On April 22, 1962, she delivered a noteworthy performance as the vengeance-seeking bullying mother, "Ma Martin", of three grown sons in the episode "The Youngest" of the ABC-Warner Brothers Western series, Lawman.

== Personal life ==
In 1920, she wed actor Harry Carey, with whom she remained until his death in 1947. They had two children, a daughter Ellen and a son, actor Harry Carey, Jr. In 1928, the failure of the St. Francis Dam northwest of Los Angeles caused a flood, the damages of which included seven deaths on the Careys' ranch and a loss estimated at $750,000 ($13.7 million today). As a result, when Harry Carey died in 1947, his estate was worth only about $15,000 ($242,000 today).

== Death ==
Carey died of natural causes at the age of 92 at her home in Carpinteria, California.

== Filmography ==
- The Sorrowful Shore (1913) – The Orphan
- Tess of the Storm Country (1914) – Teola Graves
- When the Gods Played a Badger Game (1915) – Marie – a Chorus Girl
- Such Is Life (1915) – Olive Trent
- Just Jim (1915) – Aunt Mary
- The Millionaire Paupers (1915)
- The Frame-Up (1915) – Nell Harter
- A Knight of the Range (1916) – Bess Dawson
- Stampede in the Night (1916) – Nell Wilson
- The Night Riders (1916) – Jennie Marston – the Sheriff's Sister
- The Passing of Hell's Crown (1916) – Rose Graney
- The Wedding Guest (1916) – Panchita
- The Committee on Credentials (1916) – Josephine
- For the Love of a Girl (1916) – Jane Buckley – Cliff's Daughter
- Love's Lariat (1916) – Goldie Le Croix
- A Woman's Eyes (1916) – Sunny Baker
- The Devil's Own (1916) – Vera Browning
- The Yellow Pawn (1916)
- Trader Horn (1931) – Edith Trent
- The Vanishing Legion (1931, Serial) – Nurse Lewis [Chs. 9–12]
- Border Devils (1932) – Ethel Denham
- Naughty Marietta (1935) – Madame Renavant (uncredited)
- The Whip Hand (1951) – Mabel Turner
- On Dangerous Ground (1951) – Mrs. Brent
- Monkey Business (1952) – Johnny's Mother (uncredited)
- Face to Face (1952) – Laura Lee ('The Bride Comes to Yellow Sky')
- Affair with a Stranger (1953) – Cynthia Craig
- Rogue Cop (1954) – Selma
- The Cobweb (1955) – Mrs. O'Brien – Nurse
- I Died a Thousand Times (1955) – Ma Goodhue
- The Searchers (1956) – Mrs. Jorgenson
- Pillars of the Sky (1956) – Mrs. Anne Avery
- The Wings of Eagles (1957) – Bridy O'Faolain (uncredited)
- Gunfight at the O.K. Corral (1957) – Mrs. Clanton
- Run of the Arrow (1957) – Mrs. O'Meara
- Night Passage (1957) – Miss Vittles
- The Alamo (1960) – Mrs. Dennison
- Two Rode Together (1961) – Mrs. Abby Frazer
- Billy the Kid vs. Dracula (1966) – Dr. Henrietta Hull (final film role)

== Selected television appearances ==
- Mr. Adams and Eve – regular cast – Elsie (1957–1958)
- Wagon Train – episode "The Jesse Cowan Story" – Dorcas Beale S1 E17 (1957)
- The Restless Gun - episode "The Peddler" (1958)
- The Rifleman – episode – episode "Shivaree" – Ma Wilson (1959)
- Tombstone Territory – episode "Trail’s End" – Frieda Thompson (1959)
- New Comedy Showcase – episode "Maisie" – Mrs. Clary (1960)
- Dennis the Menace - episode "Man of the House" - Mrs. Rafferty (1960)
