= Jesse James vs. the Daltons =

1954 film by William Castle

- Directed by: William Castle
- Written by: Samuel Newman
- Screenplay by: Robert E. Kent
- Story by: Edwin V. Westrate
- Produced by: Sam Katzman
- Starring: Brett King; Barbara Lawrence; James Griffith
- Cinematography: Lester White
- Edited by: Viola Lawrence
- Color process: Technicolor
- Production company: Columbia Pictures
- Distributed by: Columbia Pictures
- Release date: April 2, 1954
- Running time: 65 minutes
- Country: United States
- Language: English

Jesse James vs. the Daltons is a 1954 American 3-D Western film directed by William Castle and starring Brett King, Barbara Lawrence and James Griffith. It was produced and distributed by Columbia Pictures and was one of three films shot by Castle in 3-D during the 1950s 3-D 'golden era'.

== Plot ==
Joe Branch (Brett King), rumored to be the son of outlaw Jesse James, sets out to contact the infamous Dalton Gang and to learn the truth about his legendary father.

== Cast ==
- Brett King as Joe Branch
- Barbara Lawrence as Kate Manning
- James Griffith as Bob Dalton
- William Phipps as Bill Dalton
- John Cliff as Grat Dalton
- Rory Mallinson as Bob Ford
- William Tannen as Emmett Dalton
- Richard Garland as Gilkie
- Nelson Leigh as Father Kerrigan
