= Stampede in the Night =

1916 film

- Directed by: Jacques Jaccard
- Written by: Jacques Jaccard; Harry Carey
- Starring: Hoot Gibson
- Release date: February 26, 1916
- Running time: 20 minutes
- Country: United States
- Languages: Silent; English intertitles

Stampede in the Night is a 1916 American short Western film directed by Jacques Jaccard.

== Plot ==
This plot synopsis comes from the Moving Picture World magazine for February 26, 1916:

Old man Wilson is much inclined to a liberal use of liquor. His daughter, Nell, is known and liked by all the cowboys of the surrounding ranches. Jack Harding is especially fond of Nell. Old man Wilson fears Jack. The manager of the ranch on which Jack works is negotiating with a live stock exchange relative to the sale of a bunch of horses; and, accordingly, the buyer of the exchange, Neal Banning, arrives on the ground, accompanied by his daughter, to look over the stock. Jack finds the city-bred girl very fascinating, while she finds much to admire in the young cowboy. The two take many rides together, in which Jack explains the country and the business of the live stock people to the girl. Nell notices the growing intimacy between the two, and is very down hearted over it.

Banning takes a liking to Jack and the girl tells him he can secure a place with her father in Kansas City. Jack promises to think the matter over. Banning and his daughter leave for the railroad station to await the arrival of the stock. Nell, noticing the growing preoccupation of Jack surmises he is thinking a great deal of the other girl, and she decides to exert.

== Cast ==
- Hoot Gibson
- Olive Carey credited as Olive Fuller Golden
- Neal Hart
- William Canfield
- Peggy Coudray

== See also ==
- Hoot Gibson filmography
