= The Honor of the Family =

1912 silent short film

- Written by: C.B. Hoadley
- Production company: Rex Motion Picture Company
- Distributed by: Universal Film Manufacturing Company
- Release date: November 7, 1912
- Running time: 1 reel
- Country: United States
- Languages: Silent; English intertitles

The Honor of the Family is a 1912 American silent short drama film produced by the Rex Motion Picture Company. The film is a melodramatic one between two brothers and a woman named Marja. Gerald admires the girl and warns his visiting brother, Claude, to leave her alone. Infatuated, Claude and Marja secretly marry before Claude returns to England with a promise to return for her. As the months pass, Marja becomes broken-hearted and attempts suicide, but ends up crippled for life. Claude dies and Gerald cares for Marja, even forging a letter to keep her spirits up. Marja comes to love Gerald and all is revealed on a later date.

The film was released on November 7, 1912. The film was claimed to be the debut of Lon Chaney, but this has been disputed. Lon Chaney: A Thousand Faces states that Chaney's film debut occurred after his wife's suicide attempt in April 1913, but notes the possibility existed during his unemployment in 1912. The film is presumed lost.

== Plot ==
A summary of the film was published in The Moving Picture News, "Claude the elder brother, is heir to the estates of Sir Tames by reason of the laws of England. He is a rogue and spendthrift. Gerald, the younger brother, leaves England to seek his fortune in America, being the recipient of a remittance at stated intervals. He goes to the mountains of the West and engages in mining. There he meets Marja and admires the girl. Claude comes to visit him, sees the girl, remarks her comeliness and marks her for his own. Gerald notices this and knowing his brother, warns him to let the girl alone. Marja is infatuated with the well-dressed visitor and is easily influenced. She consents to a secret marriage and Claude returns to England, promising to come back and claim her. Some months later Gerald proposes marriage to the girl and she sobbingly tells him she has married Claude. Gerald remains silent and does not denounce his brother. Marja does not hear from Claude but Gerald receives a paper from London announcing the marriage of Claude to a society woman, and he is furious with rage. Marja, broken-hearted over the silence of Claude, attempts suicide by throwing herself from an eminence and is found by Gerald, a cripple for life. He goes to civilization and purchases a wheel chair [so] that she may get about. Her father dies and Gerald takes her to his cabin, he [sleeps] outside in a tent. She grieves for Claude and he writes her a letter purporting to come from Claude, sending her some money and breathing love and devotion, and she is happy for a time."

"Gerald receives a letter from his father announcing the death of Claude and calling him home to assume his position as the heir of the estates of Sir James. Gerald places the letter in his pocket together with the newspaper account of the marriage of Claude and decides not to return to England but to remain and care for the lawful wife of his brother, whom he has grown to love fondly. Some time afterward he goes to his mine, wheeling the girl along with him. He wheels her to the mouth of the shaft and leaves her, after throwing his coat over the arm of her chair. His devotion has caused her to love him. She tries to change her position and the coat falls to the ground. She picks it up and the letter from England and the paper falls out. She reads the announcement of the marriage of Claude and then, feeling justified, she reads the letter announcing the death of Claude and of Gerald being heir to the estates and a gentleman. She reflects and then draws the forged letter from her bosom and sees that it was written after the announcement of the marriage. It is all revealed to her. The sacrifice of Gerald — the double duty, love and a desire to uphold the honor of the proud English family. She cries to Gerald but cannot make him hear. In her desperation she tries to wheel her chair down the slope and it is overturned. Her cries bring Gerald and when he comes she shows him the newspaper and the letter. He is silent. He cannot explain. She reaches out her arms to him and is clasped to his heart."

== Production and release ==
The film was produced by the Rex Motion Picture Company and was released on November 7, 1912. It was released as a single reel. The film's length was approximately 592 feet. An article from Moving Picture News lists C.B. Hoadley as the writer of the film, but no other production and cast credits are known. During this era, the players in the film were not credited and anonymity was the rule.

The film appears to have had a widespread national release and numerous newspapers contain advertisements for the film. These include The Colonial in Oshkosh Daily Northwestern of Oshkosh, Wisconsin, the City Theater in Williamsport Sun-Gazette of Williamsport, Pennsylvania, the Hippodrome in The Allentown Democrat of Allentown, Pennsylvania, and others including theaters in Maryland, Texas, and Oregon.

== Reception and legacy ==
The Moving Picture World reviewed it positively, stating that the film was "pleasingly melodramatic in which we find our old friends, hero, heroine and villain, who always entertain us when they really live up to their characters. ... It is humanly and naturally acted, the scenes are well made and often poetic, and the story moves smoothly without dragging."

The film's enduring legacy stems from the disputed belief that Lon Chaney debuted in this film. Jon C. Mirsalis writes "None of the characters are billed in this Rex melodrama, although Chaney is clearly featured in a publicity still. This is the earliest known film in which Chaney appeared, but is undoubtedly one of many unbilled appearances he made at Universal."

In Michael Blake's book A Thousand Faces: Lon Chaney's Unique Artistry in Motion Pictures, Blake does not mention this film, but notes that the possibility exists of Chaney performing in a film role during a period of unemployment in 1912. The date of the film's production is unknown, but the book notes that Chaney rejoined Clarence Kolb and Max Dill's company in San Francisco, California in September 1912, making it very unlikely that he appeared in this film. The documentary Lon Chaney: A Thousand Faces also states that Chaney's first works were at Nestor Studios." The documentary also notes that Chaney's film debut only occurred after his wife's suicide attempt in April, 1913.

The film is now considered lost. It is unknown when the film was lost, but if it was in Universal's vaults it would have been deliberately destroyed along with the remaining copies of Universal's silent era films in 1948 or even earlier in a vault fire that occurred in 1924.

== See also ==
- List of lost films
- Lon Chaney filmography
