= A Japanese Idyll =

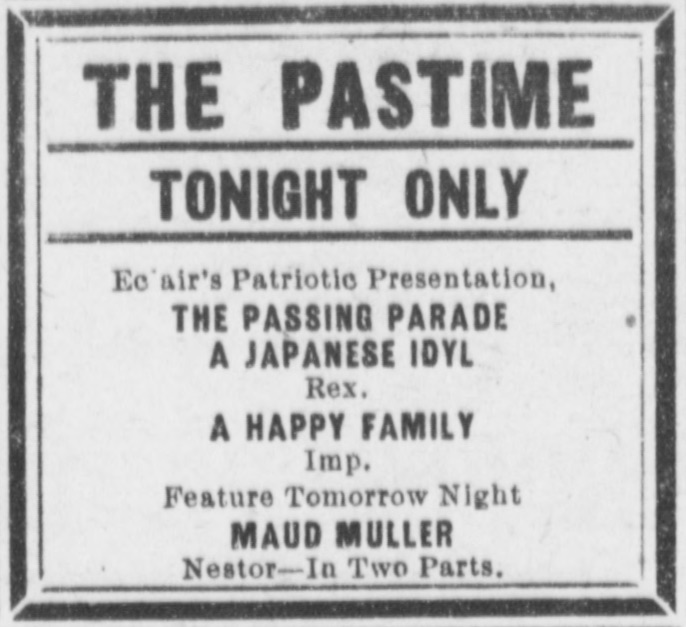
- Newspaper advertisement
- Directed by: Lois Weber
- Produced by: Rex Motion Picture Company
- Starring: Lois Weber
- Distributed by: Universal Film Manufacturing Company
- Release date: August 29, 1912
- Running time: 1 reel
- Country: USA
- Language: Silent..English titles

A Japanese Idyll is a 1912 silent short drama film directed by and starring Lois Weber. The film was produced by the Rex Motion Picture Company for release by Universal Film Manufacturing Company.

The film is preserved at the Library of Congress.

== Cast ==
- Lois Weber
