= Tess of the Storm Country (1914 film) =

1914 American silent drama film

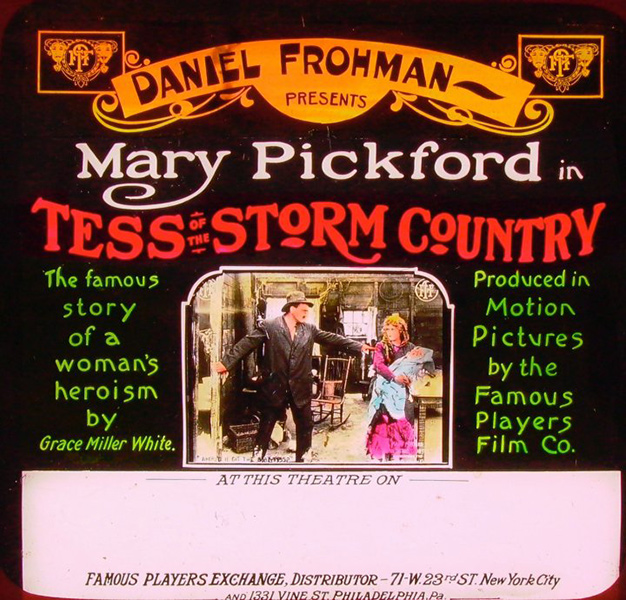
- Lantern slide for the film
- Directed by: Edwin S. Porter
- Written by: B. P. Schulberg
- Based on: Tess of the Storm Country by Grace Miller White
- Produced by: Famous Players Film Company
- Starring: Mary Pickford
- Cinematography: Edwin S. Porter
- Production company: Famous Players Film Company
- Distributed by: Famous Players Film Company (State's Rights Distribution)
- Release date: March 20, 1914
- Running time: 80 minutes (5 reels)
- Country: United States
- Language: Silent (English intertitles)
- Budget: $10,000

Full movie

Tess of the Storm Country is a 1914 American silent drama directed by Edwin S. Porter. It is based on the 1909 novel of the same name by Grace Miller White. It stars Mary Pickford, in a role she would reprise eight years later for the 1922 adaptation by John S. Robertson.

In 2006, the film was selected for preservation in the National Film Registry by the Librarian of Congress, for its "cultural, aesthetic, or historical significance".

== Plot ==
Tessibel Skinner is a young woman in a squatter village on the coast, where she lives with her father, a local fisherman. Towering above the village is the estate of Elias Graves, a wealthy man who hopes to use his influence to remove these squatters from his land. When his lawyer is unable to do so directly, he instead enacts a ban on net fishing, removing the livelihoods of many people in the village, including Tess and her father.

Despite the ban, some continue to fish illegally, though they are soon confronted by men sent by Graves. In this confrontation, one of Graves' men is shot and killed. Tess' father is wrongfully accused of the murder and arrested. Meanwhile, through these altercations Tess meets Frederick Graves, Elias' son, who is home on a break from his theological studies. Before long, the two begin a forbidden romance. Also on break with Frederick is Dan Jordan, a friend from his fraternity, who simultaneously falls in love with Frederick's sister, Teola.

Soon after Dan and Frederick return to college, Teola learns that she is pregnant and struggles to decide if she should tell Dan. Her decision is made for her soon enough, as she receives a letter informing her that Dan has died heroically in a fire at the fraternity. Unable to confide in her very stern father, Teola is distraught and turns to Tess for support. Once the baby is born, Tess agrees to take the child and bear the social stigma of having a child out of wedlock.

Upon his return, Frederick is forced to shun Tess for her sin despite his remaining love for her. Soon, however, Teola's baby falls ill and Tess decides to take him up to Elias' church to be baptized. Disgusted by Tess and the child, Elias refuses, shaming them publicly. Teola, having witnessed her father's anger, decides to step forward and admit the truth about her child. Tess is forgiven. Teola's baby dies. The real murderer of Grave's man is revealed, releasing Tess's dad from jail.

== Production ==
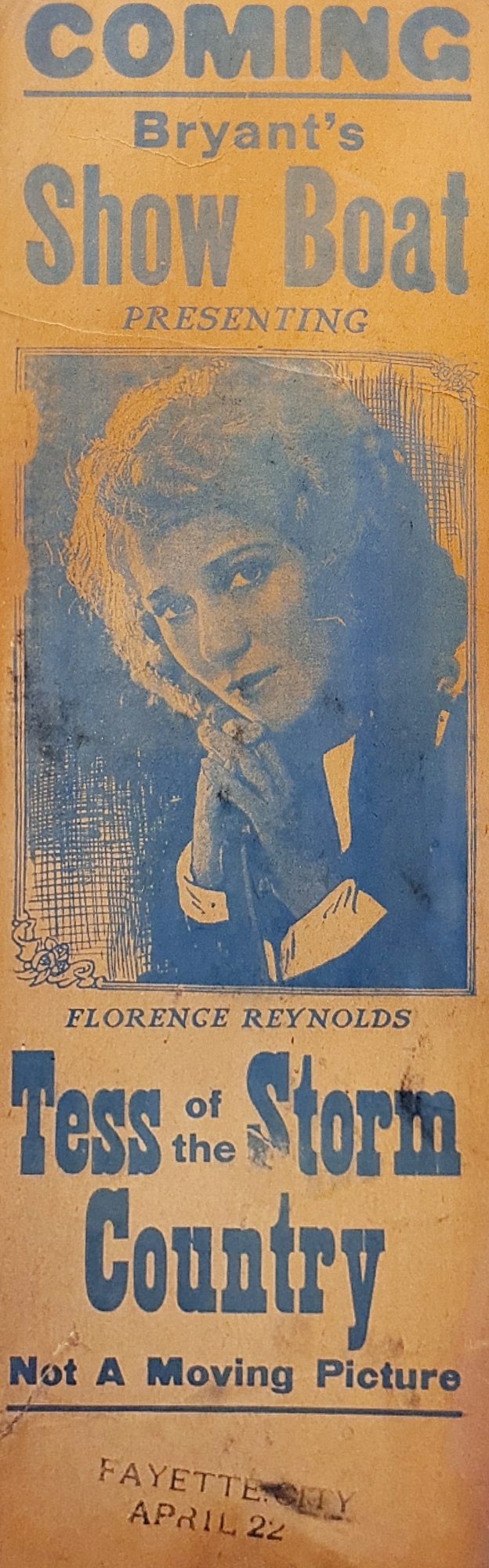
Poster for a Bryant's Show Boat live production of Tess of the Storm Country in Fayette City, Pennsylvania.

The film was produced in 1914 by Adolph Zukor's Famous Players Film Company with a budget of $10,000. One of the first feature films to come out of early Hollywood, shooting was spread between the California cities of Del Mar and Santa Monica.

When Zukor gave Mary Pickford the script to Tess of the Storm Country, she had to be persuaded to take the lead role. The script was based on a successful novel of the same name by Grace Miller White, but it eliminated much of the book's moral pieties, complexity, and regional dialect. What was left—and what gave Pickford pause—was melodramatic, clichéd, and direct.

Pickford eventually accepted the role due to the popularity of White's novel, but she chafed under Edwin S. Porter's direction. She later told a film historian that Porter "knew nothing about directing. Nothing." The aging Porter was still employing an outdated approach to film-making that worked so successfully for him in films like The Great Train Robbery (1903). For example, he resisted using camera movement to his advantage, decorated his sets with painted backdrops, and refused to take advantage of film's illusion of depth. Pickford, one of the most influential pioneers in film-making and acting, was used to working collaboratively with directors and cinematographers to get the best shot. She was also adept at modulating for the camera, and commanding attention within a frame. While Porter refused to consider Pickford's suggestions, she helped turn the film into a resounding success. She later pointed to the film as "the beginning of my career."

== Distribution ==
The film first released in US theaters on March 30, 1914, and was rapidly successful, particularly in propelling the fame of its star, Mary Pickford, to new heights. Distribution was handled by producer Daniel Frohman, one of the original founders of the Famous Players Film Company. The film survives today due to the preservation efforts of the Mary Pickford Foundation and the film archives of UCLA.

== Cast ==
- Mary Pickford as Tessibel Skinner
- Harold Lockwood as Frederick Graves
- Olive Carey as Teola Graves
- David Hartford as Daddy Skinner
- Louise Dunlap as Old Mother Moll
- William Walters as Elias Graves
- Richard Garrick as Ben Letts
- Eugene Walter as Ezra Longman
- Jack Henry as Dan Jordan
- H.R. Macy as DeForrest Young, Attorney at Law
- H.L. Griffith as Old Longman
- Milton Berle
