= Jessie Arnold =

American actress

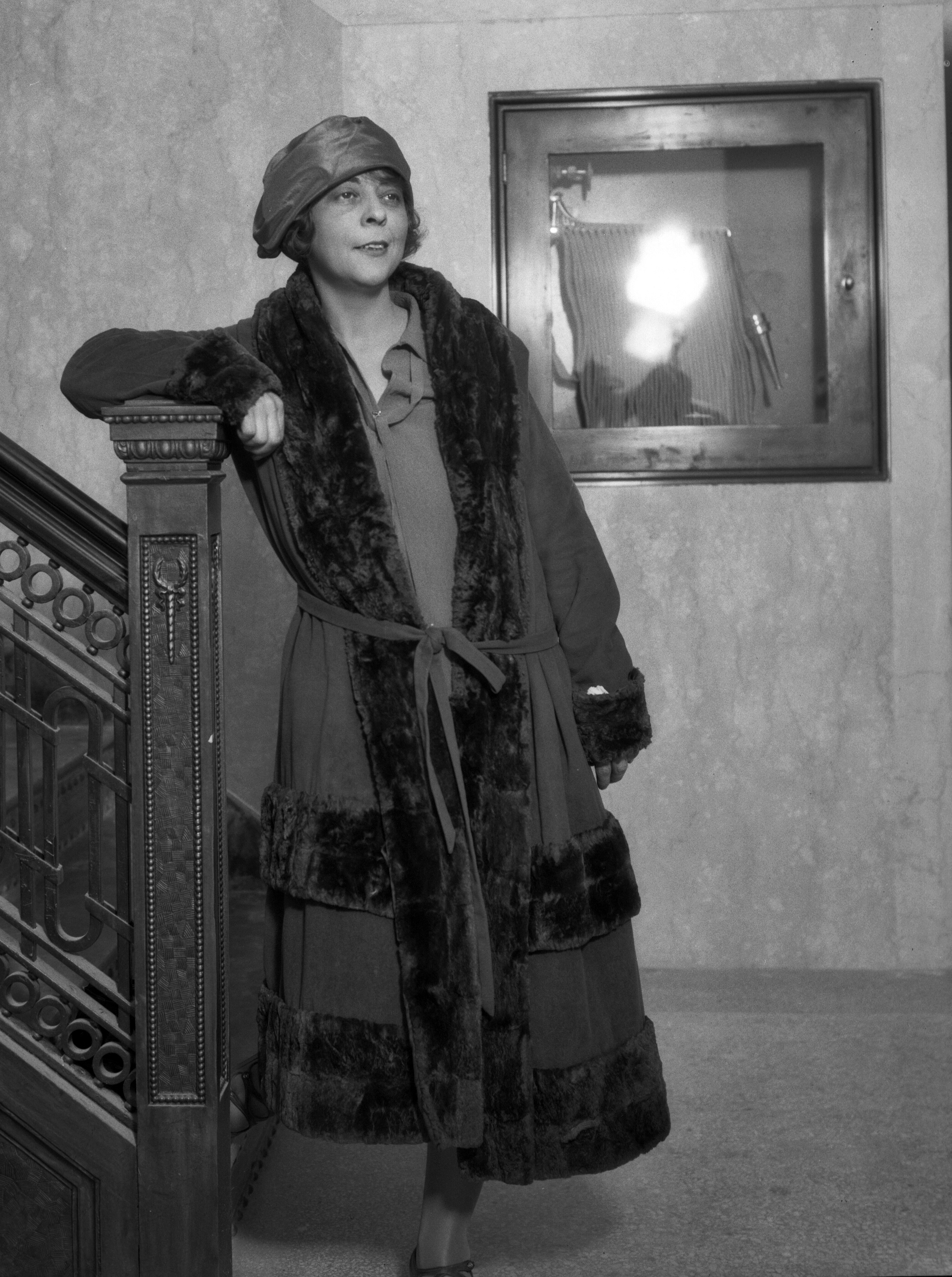
- Born: December 3, 1884
- Died: May 5, 1955 (aged 70),
- Occupation: Actress

Jessie Arnold (December 3, 1884 – May 5, 1955) was an American character and film actress who appeared in more than 150 films from silent shorts to the early 1950s. In 1916 she joined Universal City's stock company after touring Australia, and "the Orient". She was in the serial Timothy Hobbs directed by Wallace Berry.. She starred in the 1916 film Cross Purposes directed by William Worthington.

== Filmography ==
- Temptation, (1915) (uncredited)
- Cross Purposes (1916) as Lisa
- Tennessee's Pardner (1916) as Kate Kent
- The Social Pirates (1916)
- Shoes (1916) as Lil, co-worker at store
- Rough and Ready (1918) as Estelle Darrow
- The Dark Mirror (1920) as Inez
- Blackbirds (1920) as Suzanne
- The Idol of the North (1921) as Big Blond
- Fury (1923) as Boy's Mother
- Innocence (1923) as Wedding Guest (uncredited)
- Playing with Souls (1925) as Louise
- The Hard Hombre (1931) as Mrs. Patton
- Behind Jury Doors (1932) as Ma Mauger
- Virtue (1932) as Landlady
- Whistlin' Dan (1932) as Horty "Whistlin' Dan"
- Hot Saturday (1932) as Aunt Minnie
- Police Car 17 (1933) as Neighbor
- It Happened One Night (1934) as woman in auto park
- Stella Dallas (1937) as Ed's landlady
- The Beloved Brat (1938) as Nurse (uncredited)
- Haunted House (1940) as Mrs. Emily Henshaw
- No Greater Sin (1941) as Miss Calhoun
- What's Buzzin', Cousin? (1943) as Mrs. Hillbilly
- My Kingdom for a Cook (1943) as Mrs. Forsythe
- Louisiana Hayride (1944) as Aunt Hepzibah (uncredited)
- Sundown Valley (1944) as Mom Johnson
- Lawless Empire (1945) as Mrs. Murphy
- Prison Ship (1945) as Prisoner
- Keeper of the Bees (1947) as Mrs. Postmaster
- My Dog Rusty (1948) as Mrs. Stokes (uncredited)
- Air Hostess (1949) as Mrs. Peabody
- The Traveling Saleswoman (1950) as Lady Customer (uncredited)
- When the Redskins Rode (1951) as Gossip at Wrestling Match
