= The Wedding Guest (1916 film) =

1916 film

- Directed by: Jacques Jaccard
- Written by: Lucia Chamberlain; Jacques Jaccard; Bess Meredyth
- Produced by: Bison Motion Pictures
- Starring: Harry Carey
- Distributed by: Universal Pictures
- Release date: May 27, 1916
- Running time: 20 minutes; 2 reels
- Country: United States
- Language: Silent with English intertitles

The Wedding Guest is a 1916 American silent drama film, featuring Harry Carey.

== Plot ==
The film follows a respected county sheriff who comes to the aid of Panchita Garcia after she is harassed by a local outlaw.

== Cast ==
- Harry Carey as The Squarest Sheriff Alive
- Olive Carey (credited as Olive Fuller Golden)
- William Canfield
- Joe Rickson
- Peggy Coudray
- Hoot Gibson
- Neal Hart
- Paul Loring

== See also ==
- List of lost films
- Thanhouser Company
