= The Heart of the Hills (1914 film) =

- Directed by: Wallace Reid
- Written by: Wallace Reid
- Produced by: Rex Motion Picture Company
- Starring: Wallace Reid; Dorothy Davenport
- Distributed by: Universal Film Manufacturing Company
- Release date: March 12, 1914
- Running time: 2 reels
- Country: USA
- Language: Silent...English intertitles

The Heart of the Hills is a 1914 silent short film directed by and starring Wallace Reid and co-starring his wife Dorothy Davenport. It was produced by the Rex Motion Picture Company and distributed through the Universal Film Manufacturing Company.

== Cast ==
- Wallace Reid as Dave the Woodsman
- Dorothy Davenport as The Government Detective
- Phil Dunham as Dave's Brother
- Ed Brady
- Lucile Wilson
