= The Spirit of West Point =

1947 film directed by Ralph Murphy

- Theatrical release poster
- Directed by: Ralph Murphy
- Screenplay by: Tom Reed
- Story by: Margaret Mary Howard
- Produced by: Harry Joe Brown; John W. Rogers
- Starring: Doc Blanchard; Glenn Davis; Robert Shayne; Anne Nagel; Alan Hale Jr. George O'Hanlon; Michael Browne; Tanis Chandler
- Cinematography: Lester White
- Edited by: Harvey Manger
- Production company: Bro-Rog Pictures
- Distributed by: Film Classics
- Release date: October 4, 1947
- Running time: 77 minutes
- Country: United States
- Language: English

The Spirit of West Point is a 1947 American sports drama film directed by Ralph Murphy and written by Tom Reed. The film stars Doc Blanchard, Glenn Davis, Robert Shayne, Anne Nagel, Alan Hale Jr., George O'Hanlon, Michael Browne and Tanis Chandler. The film was released on October 4, 1947, by Film Classics.

== Plot ==
The story of Doc Blanchard and Glenn Davis, who attended West Point together and each won the Heisman Trophy.

== Cast ==
- Doc Blanchard as himself
- Glenn Davis as himself
- Robert Shayne as Col. Earl 'Red' Blaik
- Anne Nagel as Mrs. Blaik
- Alan Hale Jr. as Oklahoma Cutter
- George O'Hanlon as Joe Wilson
- Michael Browne as Roger 'Mileaway' McCarty
- Tanis Chandler as Mildred
- Mary Newton as Mrs. Mary Blanchard
- William Forrest as Dr. Felix Blanchard
- Lee Bennett as Cadet Cabot
- Mickey McCardle as Quarterback
- John Gallaudet as Bert Ferriss
- Rudy Wissler as Young Doc Blanchard
- Tom Harmon as Radio Sportscaster
- Bill Stern as Radio Sportscaster
- Harry Wismer as Radio Sportscaster
- Margaret Wells as Mrs. Davis
- Franklin Parker as Ralph Davis Sr.
